= List of SEA Games medalists in athletics =

List of medalists

Athletics competitions have been held at the Southeast Asian Games since the inaugural edition of the South East Asian Peninsular Games in 1959.

== List of medalists ==
=== Men's 100 metres ===
Year	Gold		Silver		Bronze	
1959 Bangkok	Suthi Manyakass (THA)	10.40				
1961 Rangoon	Suthi Manyakass (THA)	10.40				
1965 Rangoon	Mani Jegathesan (MAS)	10.50				
1967 Bangkok	Rajalingam Gunaratnam (MAS)	10.50				
1969 Rangoon	C. Kunalan (SIN)	10.50				
1971 Kuala Lumpur	Anat Ratanapol (THA)	10.70				
1973 Singapore	Anat Ratanapol (THA)	10.30	Suchart Jairsuraparp (THA)	10.50	Samphon Mao (CAM)	10.70
1975 Bangkok	Anat Ratanapol (THA)	10.38				
1977 Bangkok	Suchart Jairsuraparp (THA)	10.58	Anat Ratanapol (THA)	10.75	C. Kunalan (SIN)	10.81
1979 Jakarta	Suchart Jairsuraparp (THA)	10.50				
1981 Manila	Suchart Jairsuraparp (THA)	10.6	Sumet Promna (THA)	10.7	Tang Ngai Kin (SIN)	11.10
1983 Singapore	Suchart Jairsuraparp (THA)	10.59	Mohamed Purnomo (INA)	10.62	Sumet Promna (THA)	10.67
1985 Bangkok	Christian Nenepath (INA)	10.54	Sumet Promna (THA)	10.54	Mohamed Purnomo (INA)	10.62
1987 Jakarta	Sumet Promna (THA)	10.36	Mardi Lestari (INA)	10.49	Haron Mundir (SIN)	10.57
1989 Kuala Lumpur	Mardi Lestari (INA)					
1991 Manila	Mardi Lestari (INA)	10.44	Visut Watanasin (THA)	10.59		
1993 Singapore	Mardi Lestari (INA)					
1995 Chiang Mai	Reanchai Seeharwong (THA)					
1997 Jakarta	Vissanu Sophanich (THA)					
1999 Bandar Seri Begawan	Reanchai Seeharwong (THA)					
2001 Kuala Lumpur	Reanchai Seeharwong (THA)	10.29	U. K. Shyam (SIN)	10.37	Kongdech Natenee (THA)	10.45
2003 Hanoi	Nazmizan Mohamad (MAS)	10.48	Sittichai Suwonprateep (THA)	10.50	John Herman Muray (INA)	10.60
2005 Manila	Wachara Sondee (THA)	10.47	Sompote Suwannarangsri (THA)	10.52	Suryo Agung Wibowo (INA)	10.57
2007 Nakhon Ratchasima	Suryo Agung Wibowo (INA)	10.25	Wachara Sondee (THA)	10.33	Mohd Noor Imran Hadi (MAS)	10.54
2009 Vientiane	Suryo Agung Wibowo (INA)	10.17 GR	Wachara Sondee (THA)	10.30	Mohammad Fadlin (INA)	10.61
2011 Palembang	Franklin Ramses Burumi (INA)	10.37	Gary Yeo (SIN)	10.46	Wachara Sondee (THA)	10.47
2013 Naypyidaw	Jirapong Meenapra (THA)	10.48	Iswandi (INA)	10.51	Muhammad Amirudin Jamal (SIN)	10.55
2015 Singapore	Eric Cray (PHI)	10.25	Yaspi Boby (INA)	10.45	Iswandi (INA)	10.45
2017 Kuala Lumpur	Khairul Hafiz Jantan (MAS)	10.38	Eric Cray (PHI)	10.43	Kritsada Namsuwun (THA)	10.43
2019 Philippines	Muhammad Haiqal Hanafi (MAS)	10.35	Ruttanapon Sowan (THA)	10.49	Bandit Chuangchai (THA)	10.52
2021 Hanoi	Puripol Boonson (THA)	10.40	Soraoat Dapbang (THA)	10.56	Marc Brian Louis (SIN)	10.56
2023 Phnom Penh	Soraoat Dapbang (THA)	10.37	Marc Brian Louis (SIN)	10.39	Muhammad Haiqal Hanafi (MAS)	10.45

=== Men's 200 metres ===
Year	Gold		Silver		Bronze	
1959 Bangkok	Suthi Manyakass (THA)	10.40				
1961 Rangoon	Mani Jegathesan (Malaya)	21.5				
1965 Rangoon	Mani Jegathesan (MAS)	21.3				
1967 Bangkok	Rajalingam Gunaratnam (MAS)	21.3				
1969 Rangoon	C. Kunalan (SIN)	21.28				
1971 Kuala Lumpur	Anat Ratanapol (THA)	21.3				
1973 Singapore	Anat Ratanapol (THA)	21.6	Sinnayah Sabapathy (MAS)	22.3	Samphon Mao (CAM)	22.3
1975 Bangkok	Anat Ratanapol (THA)	21.33				
1977 Bangkok	Anat Ratanapol (THA)	21.42	Jeffrey Mathelemual (INA)	21.90	Ramli Ahmad (MAS)	21.95
1979 Jakarta	Suchart Jairsuraparp (THA)	21.57				
1981 Manila	Sumet Promna (THA)	21.14	Rabuan Pit (MAS)	21.22	Jeffry Matahelemual (INA)	21.47
1983 Singapore	Sumet Promna (THA)	21.62	Haron Mundir (SIN)	21.76	Mohamed Purnomo (INA)	21.82
1985 Bangkok	Mohamed Purnomo (INA)	21.25	Rabuan Pit (MAS)	21.33	Sivaling Govindasamy (MAS)	21.88
1987 Jakarta	Sumet Promna (THA)	20.99	Mohamed Purnomo (INA)	21.26	Haron Mundir (SIN)	21.30
1989 Kuala Lumpur	Mardi Lestari (INA)	21.00				
1991 Manila	Seaksarn Boonrat (THA)	20.94				
1993 Singapore	Niti Piyapan (THA)	20.93				
1995 Chiang Mai	Reanchai Seeharwong (THA)	20.96				
1997 Jakarta	Vissanu Sophanich (THA)	21.02				
1999 Bandar Seri Begawan	Worasit Vechaphut (THA)	20.69				
2001 Kuala Lumpur	Reanchai Seeharwong (THA)	20.95	Azmi Ibrahim (MAS)	20.97	Raman Ganeshwaran (MAS)	21.35
2003 Hanoi	Nazmizan Mohamad (MAS)	21.05	Sittichai Suwonprateep (THA)	21.23	John Herman Muray (INA)	21.31
2005 Manila	Sittichai Suwonprateep (THA)	20.94	John Herman Muray (INA)	21.27	Sompote Suwannarangsri (THA)	21.40
2007 Nakhon Ratchasima	Suryo Agung Wibowo (INA)	20.76	Sittichai Suwonprateep (THA)	20.84	John Herman Muray (INA)	21.01
2009 Vientiane	Suryo Agung Wibowo (INA)	20.85	Sittichai Suwonprateep (THA)	21.12	Suppachai Chimdee (THA)	21.24
2011 Palembang	Franklin Ramses Burumi (INA)	20.93	Suppachai Chimdee (THA)	21.05	Sompote Suwannarangsri (THA)	21.46
2013 Naypyidaw	Jirapong Meenapra (THA)	21.29	Harith Ammar Mohd Sobri (MAS)	21.46	Lê Trọng Hinh (VIE)	21.47
2015 Singapore	Lê Trọng Hinh (VIE)	20.89	Jaran Sathoengram (THA)	21.05	Jirapong Meenapra (THA)	21.13
2017 Kuala Lumpur	Trenten Beram (PHI)	20.84	Jirapong Meenapra (THA)	21.22	Aravinn Thevarr Gunasegaran (MAS)	21.26
2019 Philippines	Chayut Khongprasit (THA)	20.71	Siripol Punpa (THA)	20.78	Russel Alexander Nasir Taib (MAS)	21.11
2021 Hanoi	Puripol Boonson (THA)	20.37 GR	Ngần Ngọc Nghĩa (VIE)	20.74	Chayut Khongprasit (THA)	20.77

=== Men's 400 metres ===
Year	Gold		Silver		Bronze	
1959 Bangkok	Somsak Thong-ar-ram (THA)	50.3				
1961 Rangoon	Mani Jegathesan (Malaya)	48.3				
1965 Rangoon	Victor Asirvatham (MAS)	48.0				
1967 Bangkok	Victor Asirvatham (MAS)	48.1				
1969 Rangoon	Soe Win (BIR)	49.0				
1971 Kuala Lumpur	Thomboo Krishnan (MAS)	47.8				
1973 Singapore	Baba Singhe Peyadesa (MAS)	48.2	Savin Chem (CAM)	48.5	Sayan Paratanavong (THA)	48.9
1975 Bangkok	Sayan Paratanavong (THA)	48.09				
1977 Bangkok	Sukninder Singh (MAS)	48.22	Mudjiono (INA)	48.67	Mariah Naidu (MAS)	49.00
1979 Jakarta	Rabuan Pit (MAS)	47.89				
1981 Manila	Isidro del Prado (PHI)	47.10	Rabuan Pit (MAS)	47.15	Adaikan Balakrishnan (MAS)	47.94
1983 Singapore	Isidro del Prado (PHI)	46.40	Nordin Mohamed Jadi (MAS)	47.47	Jumpapao Sanu (THA)	47.99
1985 Bangkok	Nordin Mohamed Jadi (MAS)	47.18	Romeo Gido (PHI)	47.50	I. Wayan Budi A. (INA)	48.03
1987 Jakarta	Nordin Jadi (MAS)	46.56	Isidro del Prado (PHI)	46.78	Elieser Wattebosi (INA)	
1989 Kuala Lumpur	Isidro del Prado (PHI)	47.20				
1991 Manila	Aktawat Sakoolchan (THA)	46.37				
1993 Singapore	Elieser Wattebosi (INA)	46.37				
1995 Chiang Mai	Aktawat Sakoolchan (THA)	46.05				
1997 Jakarta	Romzi Bakar (MAS)	47.13				
1999 Bandar Seri Begawan	Narong Nilploy (THA)	47.02				
2001 Kuala Lumpur	Ernie Candelario (PHI)	46.59	Narong Nilploy (THA)	46.72	Romzi Bakar (MAS)	46.94
2003 Hanoi	Ernie Candelario (PHI)	47.06	Jimar Aing (PHI)	47.23	Narong Nilploy (THA)	47.31
2005 Manila	Jimar Aing (PHI)	47.03	Ernie Candelario (PHI)	47.06	Mohd Zafril Mohd Zuslaini (MAS)	47.25
2007 Nakhon Ratchasima	Julius Felicisimo Nierras (PHI)	46.56	Jukkatip Pojaroen (THA)	46.64	Zaiful Zainal Abidin (MAS)	46.75
2009 Vientiane	Zafril Zuslaini (MAS)	47.11	Heru Astriyanto (INA)	47.35	Jukkatip Pojaroen (THA)	47.53
2011 Palembang	Heru Astriyanto (INA)	47.53	Archand Christian Bagsit (PHI)	47.71	Yakobus Leuwol (INA)	47.97
2013 Naypyidaw	Archand Christian Bagsit (PHI)	47.22	Edgardo Alejan Jr (PHI)	47.45	Edy Ariansyah (INA)	47.78
2015 Singapore	Kunanon Sukkaew (THA)	46.00 GR	Quách Công Lịch (VIE)	46.02	Edgardo Alejan Jr. (PHI)	47.08
2017 Kuala Lumpur	Trenten Beram (PHI)	46.39	Phitchaya Sunthonthuam (THA)	46.46	Quách Công Lịch (VIE)	46.48
2019 Philippines	Trần Nhật Hoàng (VIE)	46.56	Trần Đình Sơn (VIE)	46.68	Phitchaya Sunthonthuam (THA)	46.98
2021 Hanoi	Joshua Atkinson (THA)	46.44	Lê Ngọc Phúc (VIE)	47.27	Tan Zong Yang (SIN)	47.46

=== Men's 800 metres ===
Games	Gold	Silver	Bronze
1959 Bangkok	Somsak Thong-ar-ram (THA)		
1961 Rangoon	Somsak Thong-ar-ram (THA)		
1965 Rangoon	Ramasamy Subramaniam (MAS)		
1967 Bangkok	Ramasamy Subramaniam (MAS)		
1969 Rangoon	Jimmy Crampton (BIR)		
1971 Kuala Lumpur	Ramasamy Subramaniam (MAS)		
1973 Singapore	Jimmy Crampton (BIR)	Ramasamy Subramaniam (MAS)	Serjit Singh (SIN)
1975 Bangkok	Jimmy Crampton (BIR)		
1977 Bangkok	Jimmy Crampton (BIR)	Kanagarajah Yogeswaran (MAS)	Tito Tulanan (PHI)
1979 Jakarta	Pin Kraiket (PHI)		
1981 Manila	Isidro del Prado (PHI)	Pichai Pew-KramTHA (25x17px)	Pen Kraiket (THA)
1983 Singapore	Batulamai Rajakumar (MAS)	Pen Kraiket (THA)	Nordin Mohamed Jadi (MAS)
1985 Bangkok	Haridas Ramasymy (MAS)	Chern Srijudanu (THA)	Dominggus Lutrun (INA)
1987 Jakarta	Tun Wein Thein (BIR)	Chern Srichudanu (THA)	Romeo Gido (PHI)
1989 Kuala Lumpur	Samson Vellabouy (MAS)		
1991 Manila	Samson Vellabouy (MAS)		
1993 Singapore	Ramu Thangavalu (MAS)		
1995 Chiang Mai	Chern Srichudanu (THA)		
1997 Jakarta	Ramadoss Nandakumar (MAS)		
1999 Bandar Seri Begawan	Phan Van Hoa (VIE)		
2001 Kuala Lumpur	John Lozada (PHI)	Dicky Gunawan (INA)	Suthirak Pinthong (THA)
2003 Hanoi	Lê Văn Dương (VIE)	Nguyễn Đình Cương (VIE)	John Lozada (PHI)
2005 Manila	Lê Văn Dương (VIE)	Midel Dique (PHI)	John Lozada (PHI)
2007 Nakhon Ratchasima	Nguyễn Đình Cương (VIE)	Midel Dique (PHI)	Mohd Jironi Riduan (MAS)
2009 Vientiane	Nguyễn Đình Cương (VIE)	Mohd Jironi Riduan (MAS)	Subramaniam Mathialagan (MAS)
2011 Palembang	Dương Văn Thái (VIE)	Mervin Guarte (PHI)	Abdul Haris (INA)
2013 Naypyidaw	Mohd Jironi Riduan (MAS)	Mervin Guarte (PHI)	Dương Văn Thái (VIE)
2015 Singapore	Dương Văn Thái (VIE)	Mervin Guarte (PHI)	Yothin Yaprajan (THA)
2017 Kuala Lumpur	Dương Văn Thái (VIE)	Marco Vilog (PHI)	Royson Vincent (MAS)
2019 Philippines	Dương Văn Thái (VIE)	Carter Lilly (PHI)	Royson Vincent (MAS)
2021 Hanoi	Joshua Atkinson (THA)	Jirayu Pleenaram (THA)	Trần Văn Đảng (VIE)

=== Men's 1500 metres ===
Games	Gold	Silver	Bronze
1959 Bangkok	Pluadprong (THA)		
1961 Rangoon	Tira Klai-Arntgong (THA)		
1965 Rangoon	Ramasamy Subramaniam (MAS)		
1967 Bangkok	Ramasamy Subramaniam (MAS)		
1969 Rangoon	Jimmy Crampton (BIR)		
1971 Kuala Lumpur	Jimmy Crampton (BIR)		
1973 Singapore	Jimmy Crampton (BIR)	Ramasamy Subramaniam (MAS)	K. Kumarasan (MAS)
1975 Bangkok	Jimmy Crampton (BIR)		
1977 Bangkok	Jimmy Crampton (BIR)	Kanagarajah Yogeswaran (MAS)	Ramasamy Appavoo Kandiah (MAS)
1979 Jakarta	Jimmy Crampton (BIR)		
1981 Manila	Pichai Pewkram (THA)	Raju Manusammy (MAS)	Mutiah Sivalingam (MAS)
1983 Singapore	Batulamai Rajakumar (MAS)	Shwe Aung (BIR)	Nestor Trampe (PHI)
1985 Bangkok	Muthiah Sivalingam (MAS)	Chern Srijudanu (THA)	Shwe Aung (BIR)
1987 Jakarta	Muthiah Sivalingam (MAS)	Shwe Aung (BIR)	Chera Srichudanu (THA)
1989 Kuala Lumpur	Sivalingam Muthiah (MAS)		
1991 Manila	Ramu Thangavalu (MAS)		
1993 Singapore	Parluatan Siregar (INA)		
1995 Chiang Mai	Chern Srichudanu (THA)		
1997 Jakarta	Arumugam Munusamy (MAS)		
1999 Bandar Seri Begawan	Arumugam Munusamy (MAS)		
2001 Kuala Lumpur	Arumugam Munusamy (MAS)	John Lozada (PHI)	Nguyễn Văn Minh (VIE)
2003 Hanoi	John Lozada (PHI)	Trần Văn Thắng (VIE)	Chamkaur Dhaliwal Singh (SIN)
2005 Manila	Aung Thi Ha (BIR)	Hariyono (INA)	Rene Herera (PHI)
2007 Nakhon Ratchasima	Nguyễn Đình Cương (VIE)	Vadivelan Mahendran (MAS)	Boonthung Srisung (THA)
2009 Vientiane	Nguyễn Đình Cương (VIE)	Mohd Jironi Riduan (MAS)	Mahendran Vadivellan (MAS)
2011 Palembang	Ridwan Ridwan (INA)	Mervin Guarte (PHI)	Nguyễn Đình Cương (VIE)
2013 Naypyidaw	Mohd Jironi Riduan (MAS) & Dương Văn Thái (VIE)	not awarded	Ridwan Ridwan (INA)
2015 Singapore	Dương Văn Thái (VIE)	Mervin Guarte (PHI)	Yothin Yaprajan (THA)
2017 Kuala Lumpur	Dương Văn Thái (VIE)	Yothin Yaprajan (THA)	Mervin Guarte (PHI)
2019 Philippines	Dương Văn Thái (VIE)	Mariano Masano (PHI)	Yothin Yaprajan (THA)
2021 Hanoi	Lương Đức Phước (VIE)	Trần Văn Đảng (VIE)	Alfrence Braza (PHI)

=== Men's 5000 metres ===
Games	Gold	Silver	Bronze
1959 Bangkok	Ah Phu (BIR)		
1961 Rangoon	Ah Phu (BIR)		
1965 Rangoon	Dilbagh Singh Kler (MAS)		
1967 Bangkok	Ramasamy Subramaniam (MAS)		
1969 Rangoon	Jimmy Crampton (BIR)		
1971 Kuala Lumpur	Jimmy Crampton (BIR)		
1973 Singapore	Aung Than (BIR)	P. C. Suppiah (SIN)	A. Mahalingam (MAS)
1975 Bangkok	Robert (BIR)		
1977 Bangkok	Ko Ko (BIR)	Maung Hla (BIR)	Ramasamy Appavoo Kandiah (MAS)
1979 Jakarta	Ko Ko (BIR)		
1981 Manila	(Myanmar) Aung Soe Khiang	(Philippines) David Carmel	(Philippines) Arturo Alimbuyao
1983 Singapore	Maung Hla (BIR)	Aung Soe Khiang (BIR)	David Carmelo (PHI)
1985 Bangkok	Hector Begeo (PHI)	Edwardus Nabunome (INA)	G. Krishnan (MAS)
1987 Jakarta	Eduardus Nabunome (INA)	Hector Begeo (PHI)	Zainuddin (INA)
1989 Kuala Lumpur	Edwardus Nabunome (INA)		
1991 Manila	Subeno (INA)		
1993 Singapore	Munusamy Ramachandran (MAS)		
1995 Chiang Mai	Munusamy Ramachandran (MAS)		
1997 Jakarta	Munusamy Ramachandran (MAS)		
1999 Bandar Seri Begawan	Munusamy Ramachandran (MAS)		
2001 Kuala Lumpur	Eduardo Buenavista (PHI)	I Gede Karang Asem (INA)	Boonchu Chandecha (THA)
2003 Hanoi	Boonthung Srisung (THA)	Eduardo Buenavista (PHI)	Aung Thu Ya (BIR)
2005 Manila	Boonthung Srisung (THA)	Julius Sermona (PHI)	Amnuay Tongmit (THA)
2007 Nakhon Ratchasima	Boonthung Srisung (THA)	Julius Sermona (PHI)	Hem Bunting (CAM)
2009 Vientiane	Aung Khaing (BIR)	Boonthung Srisung (THA)	Julius Sermona (PHI)
2011 Palembang	Agus Prayogo (INA)	Jauhari Johan (INA)	Nguyễn Văn Lai (VIE)
2013 Naypyidaw	Nguyễn Văn Lai (VIE)	Boonthung Srisung (THA)	Ridwan Ridwan (INA)
2015 Singapore	Nguyễn Văn Lai (VIE)	Agus Prayogo (INA)	Sanchai Namkhet (THA)
2017 Kuala Lumpur	Nguyễn Văn Lai (VIE)	Prabudass Krishnan (MAS)	Agus Prayogo (INA)
2019 Philippines	Kieran Tuntivate (THA)	Nguyễn Văn Lai (VIE)	Sonny Wagdos (PHI)
2021 Hanoi	Nguyễn Văn Lai (VIE)	Felisberto de Deus (TLS)	Sonny Wagdos (PHI)

=== Men's 10,000 metres ===
Games	Gold	Silver	Bronze
1959 Bangkok	Somnuek Srisombat (THA)		
1961 Rangoon	Ah Phu (BIR)		
1965 Rangoon	Thin Sumbwegam (BIR)		
1967 Bangkok	Thin Sumbwegam (BIR)		
1969 Rangoon	Thin Sumbwegam (BIR)		
1971 Kuala Lumpur	P. C. Suppiah (SIN)		
1973 Singapore	Aung Than (BIR)	Ko Ko (BIR)	A. Malayandy (MAS)
1975 Bangkok	Robert (BIR)		
1977 Bangkok	Ko Ko (BIR)	Aung Than (BIR)	Ramasamy Appavoo Kandiah (MAS)
1979 Jakarta	Ko Ko (BIR)		
1981 Manila	David Carmelo (PHI)	Arturo Alimbuyao (PHI)	Michael (BIR)
1983 Singapore	Leonardo Illut (PHI)	Aung Soe Khiang (BIR)	Jagtar Singh (SIN)
1985 Bangkok	Mario Castro (PHI)	G. Krishnan (MAS)	Dharamann (BIR)
1987 Jakarta	Eduardus Nabunome (INA)	Zainuddin (INA)	Phillips (BIR)
1989 Kuala Lumpur	Edwardus Nabunome (INA)		
1991 Manila	Edwardus Nabunome (INA)		
1993 Singapore	Munusamy Ramachandran (MAS)		
1995 Chiang Mai	Munusamy Ramachandran (MAS)		
1997 Jakarta	Munusamy Ramachandran (MAS)		
1999 Bandar Seri Begawan	Munusamy Ramachandran (MAS)		
2001 Kuala Lumpur	Aung Thuya (BIR)	I Gede Karang Asem (INA)	Gopal Thein Win (BIR)
2003 Hanoi	Eduardo Buenavista (PHI)	Boonthung Srisung (THA)	Aung Thu Ya (BIR)
2005 Manila	Boonthung Srisung (THA)	Eduardo Buenavista (PHI)	Julius Sermona (PHI)
2007 Nakhon Ratchasima	Boonthung Srisung (THA)	Julius Sermona (PHI)	Soe Min Thu (BIR)
2009 Vientiane	Agus Prayogo (INA)	Jauhari Johan (INA)	Boonthung Srisung (THA)
2011 Palembang	Agus Prayogo (INA)	Jauhari Johan (INA)	Nguyễn Văn Lai (VIE)
2013 Naypyidaw	Nguyễn Văn Lai (VIE)	Boonthung Srisung (THA)	Agus Prayogo (INA)
2015 Singapore	Agus Prayogo (INA)	Boonthung Srisung (THA)	San Naing (BIR)
2017 Kuala Lumpur	Agus Prayogo (INA)	Nguyễn Văn Lai (VIE)	Sanchai Namkhet (THA)
2019 Philippines	Kieran Tuntivate (THA)	Agus Prayogo (INA)	Nguyễn Văn Lai (VIE)
2021 Hanoi	Nguyễn Văn Lai (VIE)	Felisberto de Deus (TLS)	Lê Văn Thao (VIE)

=== Men's marathon ===
Games	Gold	Silver	Bronze
1965 Rangoon	Thin Sumbwegam (BIR)		
1967 Bangkok	Myitung Naw (BIR)		
1969 Rangoon	Thin Sumbwegam (BIR)		
1971 Kuala Lumpur	Hla Thein (BIR)		
1973 Singapore	Ko Ko (BIR)	Hla Thein (BIR)	Solaimuthu (MAS)
1975 Bangkok	Soe Khin (BIR)		
1977 Bangkok	Soe Khin (BIR)	Aung Than (BIR)	Shiva Kumaravelu (SIN)
1979 Jakarta	Soe Khin (BIR)		
1981 Manila	Jimmy De la Torre (PHI)	Michael (BIR)	Ali Sofyan Siregar (INA)
1983 Singapore	Soe Khin (BIR)	Jimmy De la Torre (PHI)	Ali Sofyan Siregar (INA)
1985 Bangkok	Ali Sofyan Siregar (INA)	Sudarsono Gatot (INA)	Chanpongsri S. (THA)
1987 Jakarta	Ali Sofyan Siregar (INA)	Phillips (BIR)	Suharyanto (INA)
1989 Kuala Lumpur	Herman Suizo (PHI)		
1991 Manila	Herman Suizo (PHI)		
1993 Singapore	Naek Sagala (INA)		
1995 Chiang Mai	Suyono (INA)		
1997 Jakarta	Edwardus Nabunome (INA)		
1999 Bandar Seri Begawan	not held		
2001 Kuala Lumpur	Roy Vence (PHI)	Allan Ballester (PHI)	Osias Kamlase (INA)
2003 Hanoi	Allan Ballester (PHI)	Nguyễn Chí Đông (VIE)	Boonchoo Jandacha (THA)
2005 Manila	Boonchoo Jandacha (THA)	Roy Vence (PHI)	Allan Ballester (PHI)
2007 Nakhon Ratchasima	Yahuza (INA)	Hem Bunting (CAM)	Eduardo Buenavista (PHI)
2009 Vientiane	Eduardo Buenavista (PHI)	Yahuza (INA)	Hem Bunting (CAM)
2011 Palembang	Yahuza (INA)	Eric Panique (PHI)	Eduardo Buenavista (PHI)
2013 Naypyidaw	Mok Ying Ren (SIN)	Thaung Aye (BIR)	Eric Panique (PHI)
2015 Singapore	Soh Rui Yong (SIN)	Boonthung Srisung (THA)	Hoàng Nguyên Thanh (VIE)
2017 Kuala Lumpur	Soh Rui Yong (SIN)	Agus Prayogo (INA)	Muhaizar Mohamad (MAS)
2019 Philippines	Agus Prayogo (INA)	Samchai Namkhey (THA)	Muhaizar Mohamad (MAS)
2021 Hanoi	Hoàng Nguyên Thanh (VIE)	Agus Prayogo (INA)	Tony Payne (THA)

=== Men's 3000 metres steeplechase ===
Games	Gold	Silver	Bronze
1959 Bangkok	Dilbagh Singh Kler (MAS)		
1961 Rangoon	Dilbagh Singh Kler (MAS)		
1965 Rangoon	Dilbagh Singh Kler (MAS)		
1967 Bangkok	Ramasamy Subramaniam (MAS)		
1969 Rangoon	not held		
1971 Kuala Lumpur	Aung Than (BIR)		
1973 Singapore	Aung Than (BIR)	S.P. Kannu (SIN)	A. Manickan (MAS)
1975 Bangkok	Maung Hla (BIR)		
1977 Bangkok	Maung Hla (BIR)	Paul Thambidorai (MAS)	Michael (BIR)
1979 Jakarta	Aung Soe Khaing (BIR)		
1981 Manila	Maung Hla (BIR)	Aung Soe Khiang (BIR)	Hector Begeo (PHI)
1983 Singapore	Hector Begeo (PHI)	Maung Hla (BIR)	D. Selvarajoo (SIN)
1985 Bangkok	Hector Begeo (PHI)	Salam Abdul (INA)	Ramakrishnan M. (MAS)
1987 Jakarta	Hector Begeo (PHI)	Carlito Donina (PHI)	Samuel Huwae (INA)
1989 Kuala Lumpur	Than Myint Swe (BIR)		
1991 Manila	Hector Begeo (PHI)		
1993 Singapore	Parluatan Siregar (INA)		
1995 Chiang Mai	Hector Begeo (PHI)		
1997 Jakarta	Hector Begeo (PHI)		
1999 Bandar Seri Begawan	Jirasak Suthichat (THA)		
2001 Kuala Lumpur	Eduardo Buenavista (PHI)	Daud Mama (PHI)	Jirasak Sutthichart (THA)
2003 Hanoi	Rene Herrera (PHI)	Jirasak Sutthichart (THA)	Nguyễn Kiên Trung (VIE)
2005 Manila	Rene Herrera (PHI)	Trần Văn Thắng (VIE)	Patikarn Pechsricha (THA)
2007 Nakhon Ratchasima	Rene Herrera (PHI)	Patikarn Pechsricha (THA)	Trần Văn Thắng (VIE)
2009 Vientiane	Rene Herrera (PHI)	Patikarn Pechsricha (THA)	Trần Văn Thắng (VIE)
2011 Palembang	Rene Herrera (PHI)	Muhammad Al Quraisy (INA)	Nguyễn Đăng Đức Bảo (VIE)
2013 Naypyidaw	Christopher Ulboc Jr (PHI)	Phạm Tiến Sản (VIE)	Patikarn Pechsricha (THA)
2015 Singapore	Christopher Ulboc Jr. (PHI)	Phạm Tiến Sản (VIE)	Atjong Tio Purwanto (INA)
2017 Kuala Lumpur	Atjong Tio Purwanto (INA)	Phạm Tiến Sản (VIE)	Đỗ Quốc Luật (VIE)
2019 Philippines	Đỗ Quốc Luật (VIE)	Nguyễn Trung Cường (VIE)	Atjong Tio Purwanto (INA)
2021 Hanoi	Lê Tiến Long (VIE)	Đỗ Quốc Luật (VIE)	Atjong Tio Purwanto (INA)

=== Men's 110 metres hurdles ===
Games	Gold	Silver	Bronze
1959 Bangkok	Wong Fey Wan (SIN)		
1961 Rangoon	Wong Fey Wan (SIN)		
1965 Rangoon	Osman Merican (SIN)		
1967 Bangkok	Osman Merican (SIN)		
1969 Rangoon	Ishtiaq Mubarak (MAS)		
1971 Kuala Lumpur	Ishtiaq Mubarak (MAS)		
1973 Singapore	Ishtiaq Mubarak (MAS)	Hpone Myint (BIR)	Bala Merican (MAS)
1975 Bangkok	Hpone Myint (BIR)		
1977 Bangkok	Ishtiaq Mubarak (MAS)	Hpone Myint (BIR)	Shahidan Bahorom (MAS)
1979 Jakarta	Surapol Trupklar (THA)		
1981 Manila	Hpone Myint (BIR)	Masharuddin Mohammad Nor (MAS)	Surapol Sublar (THA)
1983 Singapore	Hero Prayogo (INA)	Renato Usno (PHI)	Hanafiah Nasir (MAS)
1985 Bangkok	Nasir Mohd Hanafiah (MAS)	Prayogo Hero (INA)	Sunardi Fauzan (INA)
1987 Jakarta	Hero Prayogo (INA)	Fauzan Sunardi (INA)	Anekpol Mongkoldech (THA)
1989 Kuala Lumpur	Zulkifli Mohamed Yatim (MAS)		
1991 Manila	Nur Herman Majid (MAS)		
1993 Singapore	Nur Herman Majid (MAS)		
1995 Chiang Mai	Nur Herman Majid (MAS)		
1997 Jakarta	Nur Herman Majid (MAS)		
1999 Bandar Seri Begawan	Nur Herman Majid (MAS)		
2001 Kuala Lumpur	Nur Herman Majid (MAS)	Narongdech Janjai (THA)	Mohd Faiz Mohamed (MAS)
2003 Hanoi	Suphan Wongsriphuck (THA)	Mohd Robani Hassan (MAS)	Edy Jakariya (INA)
2005 Manila	Mohd Robani Hassan (MAS)	Muhd Faiz Mohammad (MAS)	Narongdech Janjai (THA)
2007 Nakhon Ratchasima	Rayzam Shah Wan Sofian (MAS)	Suphan Wongsriphuck (THA)	Muhd Faiz Mohammad (MAS)
2009 Vientiane	Jamras Rittidet (THA)	Mohd Robani Hassan (MAS)	Suphan Wongsriphuck (THA)
2011 Palembang	Jamras Rittidet (THA)	Rayzam Shah Wan Sofian (MAS)	Mohd Robani Hasaan (MAS)
2013 Naypyidaw	Jamras Rittidet (THA)	Rayzam Shah Wan Sofian (MAS)	Anousone Xaysa (LAO)
2015 Singapore	Jamras Rittidet (THA)	Rayzam Shah Wan Sofian (MAS)	Patrick Unso (PHI)
2017 Kuala Lumpur	Rayzam Shah Wan Sofian (MAS)	Jamras Rittidet (THA)	Clinton Bautista (PHI)
2019 Philippines	Clinton Bautista (PHI)	Rayzam Shah Wan Sofian (MAS)	Anousone Xaysa (LAO)
2021 Hanoi	Clinton Bautista (PHI)	Ang Chen Xiang (SIN)	Natthaphon Dansungnoen (THA)

=== Men's 400 metres hurdles ===
Games	Gold	Silver	Bronze
1959 Bangkok	Tan Eng Yoon (SIN)		
1961 Rangoon	Karu Selvaratnam (MAS)		
1965 Rangoon	Migale Gunasena (SIN)		
1967 Bangkok	Andyappan Nathan (MAS)		
1969 Rangoon	Abdul Rahman Zambrose (MAS)		
1971 Kuala Lumpur	Tongchai Tipyamatee (THA)		
1973 Singapore	Tongchai Tipyamatee (THA)	Karu Selvaratnam (MAS)	Gyee Ngwe (BIR)
1975 Bangkok	Tongchai Tipyamatee (THA)		
1977 Bangkok	Simit Bolkiah (MAS)	Hpone Myint (BIR)	Melly Mofu (BIR)
1979 Jakarta	Melly Mofu (INA)		
1981 Manila	Jaime Grafilo (PHI)	Nyan Chong Jong (MAS)	Melly Mofu (INA)
1983 Singapore	Renato Unso (PHI)	Jaime Grafilo (PHI)	Elisa Tanata (INA)
1985 Bangkok	Leopoldo Arnillo (PHI)	Aranyakanont K. (THA)	Chanont Kenchan (THA)
1987 Jakarta	Herman Mandagi (INA)	Leopoldo Arnillo (PHI)	Badrul Jamaluddin (MAS)
1989 Kuala Lumpur	Krittipong Saikasoon (THA)		
1991 Manila	Chanon Keanchan (THA)		
1993 Singapore	Chanon Keanchan (THA)		
1995 Chiang Mai	Chanon Keanchan (THA)		
1997 Jakarta	Jirachai Linglom (THA)		
1999 Bandar Seri Begawan	Nur Herman Majid (MAS)		
2001 Kuala Lumpur	Jirachai Linglom (THA)	Nguyễn Bảo Huy (VIE)	Virut Sarat (THA)
2003 Hanoi	Apisit Kuttiyawan (THA)	Nguyễn Bảo Huy (VIE)	Jirachai Linglom (THA)
2005 Manila	Shahadan Jamaludin (MAS)	Apisit Kuttiyawan (THA)	Zulkarnain Purba (INA)
2007 Nakhon Ratchasima	Apisit Kuttiyawan (THA)	Zulkarnain Purba (INA)	Teeraporn Parkum (THA)
2009 Vientiane	Narongdech Janjai (THA)	Zulkarnain Purba (INA)	Phatyot Klong-Ngan (THA)
2011 Palembang	Đào Xuân Cường (VIE)	Narongdech Janjai (THA)	Adrian (INA)
2013 Naypyidaw	Eric Cray (PHI)	Adrian (INA)	Đào Xuân Cường (VIE)
2015 Singapore	Eric Cray (PHI)	Quách Công Lịch (VIE)	Adrian (INA)
2017 Kuala Lumpur	Eric Cray (PHI)	Quách Công Lịch (VIE)	Adrian (INA)
2019 Philippines	Eric Cray (PHI)	Halomoan Edwin Binsar (INA)	Quách Công Lịch (VIE)
2021 Hanoi	Eric Cray (PHI)	Quách Công Lịch (VIE)	Calvin Quek (SIN)

=== Men's high jump ===
- 1959: Tan Eng Yoon (SIN)
- 1961: Arjan Gill Singh (SIN)
- 1965: Katesperswasdi Bhakdiukul (THA)
- 1967: Zainal Salleh (MAS)
- 1969: Noor Azhar Hamid (SIN)
- 1971: Sin Sitha (KHM)
- 1973: Noor Azhar Hamid (SIN)
- 1975: Noor Azhar Hamid (SIN)
- 1977: Baljit Singh Sidhu (MAS)
- 1979: Ho Yoon Wah (MAS)
- 1981: Ho Yoon Wah (MAS)
- 1983: Ramjit Nairulal (MAS)
- 1985: Ramjit Nairulal (MAS)
- 1987: Loo Cwee Peng (MAS)
- 1989: Sivabalan Kesavan (MAS)
- 1991: Loo Cwee Peng (MAS)
- 1993: Loo Cwee Peng (MAS)
- 1995: Loo Kum Zee (MAS)
- 1997: Loo Kum Zee (MAS)
- 1999: Loo Kum Zee (MAS)
- 2001: Loo Kum Zee (MAS)
- 2003: Loo Kum Zee (MAS)
- 2005: Nguyen Duy Bang (VIE)

=== Men's pole vault ===
- 1959: Pal Singh (SIN)
- 1961: Soe Mra (BIR)
- 1965: Soe Mra (BIR)
- 1967: Mohamed Mansoor (SIN)
- 1969: Mohamed Mansoor (SIN)
- 1971: Prayul Manha Nimsakorn (THA)
- 1973: Kyaw Zaw (BIR)
- 1975: Prayul Manha Nimsakorn (THA)
- 1977: Kanop Ratanachamnong (THA)
- 1979: Thet Thun Kyaw (BIR)
- 1981: Thet Thun Kyaw (BIR)
- 1983: Chamberlain Gonzales (PHI)
- 1985: Soe Myint Aung (BIR)
- 1987: Hadi Wacono (INA)
- 1989: Nirman Rampai (INA)
- 1991: Edward Lasquette (PHI)
- 1993: Edward Lasquette (PHI)
- 1995: Edward Lasquette (PHI)
- 1997: Hendiarsin Oslan (INA)
- 1999: Nunung Jayadi (INA)
- 2001: Teh Weng Chang (MAS)
- 2003: Amnat Kunpadit (THA)
- 2005: Amnat Kunpadit (THA)

=== Men's long jump ===
- 1959: Kaimar-ud-Din bin Maidin (Malaya)
- 1961: Kaimar-ud-Din bin Maidin (Malaya)
- 1965: Kaimar-ud-Din bin Maidin (MAS)
- 1967: Kaimar-ud-Din bin Maidin (MAS)
- 1969: Kyang Aung (BIR)
- 1971: Lim Hong Kang (SIN)
- 1973: Thant Zin (BIR)
- 1975: Thant Zin (BIR)
- 1977: Thant Zin (BIR)
- 1979: Thant Zin (BIR)
- 1981: Thant Zin (BIR)
- 1983: Marwoto (INA)
- 1985: Hanapiah Nasir (MAS)
- 1987: Eko Subagyo (INA)
- 1989: Sangvorn Thaveechalermdit (THA)
- 1991: Mohamed Zaki Sadri (MAS)
- 1993: Mohamed Zaki Sadri (MAS)
- 1995: Agus Reza Irawan (INA)
- 1997: Mohamed Zaki Sadri (MAS)
- 1999: Nattaporn Namkanha (THA)
- 2001: Nattaporn Namkanha (THA)
- 2003: Mohd Shahrul Amri Suhaimi (MAS)
- 2005: Henry Dagmil (PHI)

=== Men's triple jump ===
- 1959: Tan Eng Yoon (SIN)
- 1961: Tan Eng Yoon (SIN)
- 1965: Kaimar-ud-Din bin Maidin (MAS)
- 1967: Choompol Thipyalert (THA)
- 1969: Chaiyasit Suriyachan (THA)
- 1971: Vitaya Vongsamarn (THA)
- 1973: Shahlan Tahir (MAS)
- 1975: Chaiyasit Suriyachan (THA)
- 1977: Chaiyasit Suriyachan (THA)
- 1979: Thant Zin (BIR)
- 1981: Hoo Yong Tjong (INA)
- 1983: Sangvorn Thaveechalermdit (THA)
- 1985: Sangvorn Thaveechalermdit (THA)
- 1987: Mohamed Zaki Sadri (MAS)
- 1989: Mohamed Zaki Sadri (MAS)
- 1991: Mohamed Zaki Sadri (MAS)
- 1993: Mohamed Zaki Sadri (MAS)
- 1995: Sugeng Jatmiko (INA)
- 1997: Mohamed Zaki Sadri (MAS)
- 1999: Nattaporn Namkanha (THA)
- 2001: Nattaporn Namkanha (THA)
- 2003: Nattaporn Namkanha (THA)
- 2005: Theerayut Philakong (THA)

=== Men's shot put ===
- 1959: ?. Saengnern (THA)
- 1961: Thein Win (BIR)
- 1965: Nashatar Singh Sidhu (MAS)
- 1967: Nashatar Singh Sidhu (MAS)
- 1969: Nashatar Singh Sidhu (MAS)
- 1971: Saw Sarlawla (BIR)
- 1973: Saw Sarlawla (BIR)
- 1975: Samai Chartmontri (THA)
- 1977: Usman Effendi (INA)
- 1979: Samai Chartmontri (THA)
- 1981: Bancha Supanroj (THA)
- 1983: Bancha Supanroj (THA)
- 1985: Bancha Supanroj (THA)
- 1987: Bancha Supanroj (THA)
- 1989: Arjan Singh (MAS)
- 1991: Bancha Supanroj (THA)
- 1993: Arjan Singh (MAS)
- 1995: Jittakorn Krasaeyan (THA)
- 1997: Vansavang Savatdee (THA)
- 1999: Saravut Pinitgirt (THA)
- 2001: Chatchawal Polyemg (THA)
- 2003: Dong Enxin (SIN)
- 2005: Chatchawal Polyemg (THA)

=== Men's discus throw ===
- 1959: Naw Phaha (BIR)
- 1961: Danapal Naidu (Malaya)
- 1965: Danapal Naidu (MAS)
- 1967: Danapal Naidu (MAS)
- 1969: Zaw Weik (BIR)
- 1971: Nhem Yeav (KHM)
- 1973: Nhem Yeav (KHM)
- 1975: Samai Chartmontri (THA)
- 1977: Samai Chartmontri (THA)
- 1979: Ardol Kerdsri (THA)
- 1981: Musiri Suhadi (INA)
- 1983: Ardol Kerdsri (THA)
- 1985: Ardol Kerdsri (THA)
- 1987: Ardol Kerdsri (THA)
- 1989: Ardol Kerdsri (THA)
- 1991: Fidel Repizo (PHI)
- 1993: James Wong Tuck Yim (SIN)
- 1995: James Wong Tuck Yim (SIN)
- 1997: James Wong Tuck Yim (SIN)
- 1999: James Wong Tuck Yim (SIN)
- 2001: James Wong Tuck Yim (SIN)
- 2003: James Wong Tuck Yim (SIN)
- 2005: James Wong Tuck Yim (SIN)

=== Men's hammer throw ===
- 1965: Eknath Mane (SIN)
- 1967: Eknath Mane (SIN)
- 1969: Not held
- 1971: Muthiah Dattaya (MAS)
- 1973: Muthiah Dattaya (MAS)
- 1975: Kyaw Zin (BIR)
- 1977: Sankaran Gewade (SIN)
- 1979: Muthiah Dattaya (MAS)
- 1981: Budi Darma (INA)
- 1983: Agustin Jarina (PHI)
- 1985: Samret Singh Dhaliwal (MAS)
- 1987: Budi Darma (INA)
- 1989: Samret Singh Dhaliwal (MAS)
- 1991: Wong Tee Kue (MAS)
- 1993: Wong Tee Kue (MAS)
- 1995: ?
- 1997: James Wong Tuck Yim (SIN)
- 1999: Wong Tee Kue (MAS)
- 2001: Wong Tee Kue (MAS)
- 2003: Arniel Ferrera (PHI)
- 2005: Arniel Ferrera (PHI)

=== Men's javelin throw ===
- 1959: Poltorn Samphao (THA)
- 1961: Ng Kah Liew (Malaya)
- 1965: Nashatar Singh Sidhu (MAS)
- 1967: Nashatar Singh Sidhu (MAS)
- 1969: Nashatar Singh Sidhu (MAS)
- 1971: Nashatar Singh Sidhu (MAS)
- 1973: Nashatar Singh Sidhu (MAS)
- 1975: Nashatar Singh Sidhu (MAS)
- 1977: Ballang Lasung (MAS)
- 1979: Ballang Lasung (MAS)
- 1981: Ballang Lasung (MAS)
- 1983: Ballang Lasung (MAS)
- 1985: Frans Mahuse (INA)
- 1987: Frans Mahuse (INA)
- 1989: Frans Mahuse (INA)
- 1991: Frans Mahuse (INA)
- 1993: Fredericus Mahuse (INA)
- 1995: Mohamed Yazid Imran (MAS)
- 1997: Fredericus Mahuse (INA)
- 1999: Ponsianul Kahol (INA)
- 2001: Therdsak Boonchansri (THA)
- 2003: Danilo Fresnido (PHI)
- 2005: Danilo Fresnido (PHI)

=== Men's decathlon ===
- 1965: Katesperswasdi Bhakdiukul (THA)
- 1967: Katesperswasdi Bhakdiukul (THA)
- 1969: Kyaw Nyunt (BIR)
- 1971: Kim San Chai (KHM)
- 1973: Janardhanan Vijayan (MAS)
- 1975: Prapant Srisathorn (THA)
- 1977: Prapant Srisathorn (THA)
- 1979: Prapant Srisathorn (THA)
- 1981: Hanapiah Nasir (MAS)
- 1983: Hanapiah Nasir (MAS)
- 1985: Julius Uwe (INA)
- 1987: Julius Uwe (INA)
- 1989: Mohamed Nasir Sadri (MAS)
- 1991: Timotius Sokai Ndiken (INA)
- 1993: Julius Uwe (INA)
- 1995: Timotius Sokai Ndiken (INA)
- 1997: David Yimsumruay (THA)
- 1999: Mohd Malik Ahmad Tobias (MAS)
- 2001: Fidel Gallenero (PHI)
- 2003: Mohd Malik Ahmad Tobias (MAS)
- 2005: Vu Van Huyen (VIE)

=== Men's 10,000 metres walk ===
- 1977: Vellasamy Subramaniam (MAS)
- 1979: Vellasamy Subramaniam (MAS)
- 1981: Vellasamy Subramaniam (MAS)
- 1983: Apparao (BIR)
- 1985: Vellasamy Subramaniam (MAS)
- 1987: Rachmat Sumarsono (INA)
- 1989: Tun Tin (MYA)
- 1991: Subramaniam Karunanithi (MAS)
- 1993: Tun Tin (MYA)
- 1995: Rajoo Moogan (MAS)

=== Men's 20 kilometres walk ===
- 1971: Khoo Chong Beng (MAS)
- 1973: Khoo Chong Beng (MAS)
- 1975: Win Kyi (BIR)
- 1977: Khoo Chong Beng (MAS)
- 1979: Vellasamy Subramaniam (MAS)
- 1981: Vellasamy Subramaniam (MAS)
- 1983: Apparao (BIR)
- 1985: Not held
- 1987: Rachmat Sumarsono (INA)
- 1989: Jahaluddin Lawa (INA)
- 1991: Tun Tin (MYA)
- 1993: Padmanathan Nambiars (MAS)
- 1995: ?
- 1997: Harbans Narinder Singh (MAS)
- 1999: Harbans Narinder Singh (MAS)
- 2001: Teoh Boon Lim (MAS)
- 2003: Mohd Shahrulhaizy Abdul Rahman (MAS)
- 2005: Mohd Shahrulhaizy Abdul Rahman (MAS)

=== Men's 50 kilometres walk ===
Games	Gold	Silver	Bronze
1969 Rangoon	K. Thirumai (MAS)		
1971 Kuala Lumpur	Abdul Aziz Khalil (MAS)		
1973 Singapore	Kyaw Myint (BIR)	Aziz Khalil (MAS)	S. Dorairasj (SIN)
1997 Jakarta	Saravanan Govindasamy (MAS)		
2001 Kuala Lumpur	Saravanan Govindasamy (MAS)	Sutrisno (INA)	Sakchai Samuthkao (THA)

=== Men's 4 × 100 metres relay ===
Games	Gold	Silver	Bronze
1959 Bangkok	Thailand (THA)		
1961 Rangoon	Burma (BIR)		
1965 Rangoon	Thailand (THA)		
1967 Bangkok	Thailand (THA)		
1969 Rangoon	Malaysia (MAS)		
1971 Kuala Lumpur	Thailand (THA)		
1973 Singapore	Thailand (THA)	Singapore (SIN)	Malaysia (MAS)
1975 Bangkok	Thailand (THA)		
1977 Bangkok	Thailand (THA)	Singapore (SIN)	Indonesia (INA)
1979 Jakarta	Thailand (THA)		
1981 Manila	Thailand (THA)	Indonesia (INA)	Singapore (SIN)
1983 Singapore	Thailand (THA)	Indonesia (INA)	Singapore (SIN)
1985 Bangkok	Indonesia (INA)	Malaysia (MAS)	Philippines (PHI)
1987 Jakarta	Thailand (THA)	Indonesia (INA)	Singapore (SIN)
1989 Kuala Lumpur	Thailand (THA)		
1991 Manila	Thailand (THA)		
1993 Singapore	Thailand (THA)		
1995 Chiang Mai	Thailand (THA)		
1997 Jakarta	Thailand (THA)		
1999 Bandar Seri Begawan	Thailand (THA)		
2001 Kuala Lumpur	Thailand (THA)	Malaysia (MAS)	Indonesia (INA)
2003 Hanoi	Thailand (THA)	Singapore (SIN)	Indonesia (INA)
2005 Manila	Thailand (THA)	Philippines (PHI)	Singapore (SIN)
2007 Nakhon Ratchasima	Thailand (THA)	Indonesia (INA)	Malaysia (MAS)
2009 Vientiane	Thailand (THA)	Singapore (SIN)	Indonesia (INA)
2011 Palembang	Indonesia (INA)	Singapore (SIN)	Malaysia (MAS)
2013 Naypyidaw	Thailand (THA)	Singapore (SIN)	Indonesia (INA)
2015 Singapore	Thailand (THA)	Singapore (SIN)	Indonesia (INA)
2017 Kuala Lumpur	Thailand (THA)	Indonesia (INA)	Philippines (PHI)
2019 Philippines	Thailand (THA)	Malaysia (MAS)	Philippines (PHI)
2021 Hanoi	Thailand (THA)	Malaysia (MAS)	Singapore (SIN)

=== Men's 4 × 200 metres relay ===
Games	Gold	Silver	Bronze
1975 Bangkok	Thailand (THA)		
1995 Chiang Mai	Thailand (THA)		

=== Men's 4 × 400 metres relay ===
Games	Gold	Silver	Bronze
1959 Bangkok	Thailand (THA)		
1961 Rangoon	Malaya (Malaya)		
1965 Rangoon	Malaysia (MAS)		
1967 Bangkok	Malaysia (MAS)		
1969 Rangoon	Singapore (SIN)		
1971 Kuala Lumpur	Malaysia (MAS)		
1973 Singapore	Malaysia (MAS)	Singapore (SIN)	Thailand (THA)
1975 Bangkok	Singapore (SIN)		
1977 Bangkok	Malaysia (MAS)	Thailand (THA)	Indonesia (INA)
1979 Jakarta	Indonesia (INA)		
1981 Manila	Philippines (PHI)	Malaysia (MAS)	Indonesia (INA)
1983 Singapore	Thailand (THA)	Malaysia (MAS)	Indonesia (INA)
1985 Bangkok	Philippines (PHI)	Malaysia (MAS)	Indonesia (INA)
1987 Jakarta	Malaysia (MAS)	Thailand (THA)	Indonesia (INA)
1989 Kuala Lumpur	Malaysia (MAS)		
1991 Manila	Thailand (THA)		
1993 Singapore	Thailand (THA)		
1995 Chiang Mai	Thailand (THA)		
1997 Jakarta	Malaysia (MAS)		
1999 Bandar Seri Begawan	Thailand (THA)		
2001 Kuala Lumpur	Thailand (THA)	Philippines (PHI)	Malaysia (MAS)
2003 Hanoi	Thailand (THA)	Philippines (PHI)	Vietnam (VIE)
2005 Manila	Philippines (PHI)	Thailand (THA)	Malaysia (MAS)
2007 Nakhon Ratchasima	Malaysia (MAS)	Thailand (THA)	Philippines (PHI)
2009 Vientiane	Thailand (THA)	Malaysia (MAS)	Laos (LAO)
2011 Palembang	Philippines (PHI)	Thailand (THA)	Singapore (SIN)
2013 Naypyidaw	Philippines (PHI)	Thailand (THA)	Malaysia (MAS)
2015 Singapore	Thailand (THA)	Philippines (PHI)	Vietnam (VIE)
2017 Kuala Lumpur	Thailand (THA)	Vietnam (VIE)	Philippines (PHI)
2019 Philippines	Vietnam (VIE)	Thailand (THA)	Philippines (PHI)
2021 Hanoi	Thailand (THA)	Vietnam (VIE)	Singapore (SIN)

=== Women's 100 metres ===
Year	Gold		Silver		Bronze	
1959 Bangkok	Carmen Koelmeyer (Malaya)	13.1				
1961 Rangoon	Chinda Klaichai (THA)	12.8				
1965 Rangoon	Moe San (BIR)	12.3w				
1967 Bangkok	Cheryl Dorall (MAS)	12.5				
1969 Rangoon	Khin Pu (BIR)	12.14				
1971 Kuala Lumpur	Meas Kheng (KHM)	12.30				
1973 Singapore	Eng Chiaw Guay (SIN)	12.50	Than Than (BIR)	12.55	Aye Shwe (BIR)	12.59
1975 Bangkok	Usanee Laopinkarn (THA)	12.28				
1977 Kuala Lumpur	Usanee Laopinkarn (THA) & Carolina Rieuwpassa (INA)	12.22	no silver medalist		Gloria Acedo (PHI)	12.58
1979 Jakarta	Usanee Laopinkarn (THA)	12.02				
1981 Manila	Mumtaz Jaafar (MAS)	11.84	Henny Maspaitella (INA)	11.90	Wallapa Pinij (THA)	12.09
1983 Singapore	Wallapa Pinij (THA)	11.75	Lydia de Vega (PHI)	11.78	Jaree Patthaarath (THA)	11.87
1985 Bangkok	Walapa Tangjitsusorn (THA)	11.72	Ratjai Sripet (THA)	11.77	Henny Maspaitella (INA)	11.88
1987 Jakarta	Lydia de Vega (PHI)	11.28 CR	Ratjai Sripet (THA)	11.81	Sajaratuldur Hamzah (MAS)	11.85
1989 Kuala Lumpur	Ratjai Sripet (THA)	11.57				
1991 Manila	Lydia de Vega (PHI)	11.44				
1993 Singapore	Lydia de Vega (PHI)	11.60				
1995 Chiang Mai	Elma Muros (PHI)	11.81				
1997 Jakarta	Shanti Govindasamy (MAS)	11.61				
1999 Bandar Seri Begawan	Irene Joseph (INA)	11.56				
2001 Kuala Lumpur	Supavadee Khawpeag (THA)	11.33	Oranut Klomdee (THA)	11.69	Lerma Bulauitan (PHI)	11.74
2003 Hanoi	Orranut Klomdee (THA)	11.51	Jutama Tawoncharoen (THA)	11.55	Vũ Thị Hương (VIE)	11.59
2005 Manila	Vũ Thị Hương (VIE)	11.49	Nongnuch Sanrat (THA)	11.63	Orranut Klomdee (THA)	11.66
2007 Nakhon Ratchasima	Vũ Thị Hương (VIE)	11.47	Nongnuch Sanrat (THA)	11.56	Irene Truitje Joseph (INA)	11.77
2009 Vientiane	Vũ Thị Hương (VIE)	11.34	Laphassaporn Tawoncharoen (THA) & Lê Ngọc Phượng (VIE)	11.74	Not awarded	
2011 Palembang	Serafi Anelies Unani (INA)	11.69	Nongnuch Sanrat (THA)	11.69	Vũ Thị Hương (VIE)	11.73
2013 Naypyidaw	Vũ Thị Hương (VIE)	11.59	Neeranuch Klomdee (THA)	11.85	Tassaporn Wannakit (THA)	11.91
2015 Singapore	Kayla Anise Richardson (PHI)	11.76	Tassaporn Wannakit (THA)	11.76	Veronica Shanti Pereira (SIN)	11.88
2017 Kuala Lumpur	Lê Tú Chinh (VIE)	11.56	Zaidatul Husniah Zulkifli (MAS)	11.74	Veronica Shanti Pereira (SIN)	11.76
2019 Philippines	Lê Tú Chinh (VIE)	11.54	Kristina Knott (PHI)	11.55	Veronica Shanti Pereira (SIN)	11.66
2021 Hanoi	Kayla Richardson (PHI)	11.60	Veronica Shanti Pereira (SIN)	11.62	Supanich Poolkerd (THA)	11.66

=== Women's 200 metres ===
- 1959: Ratana Supradita (THA)
- 1961: Chinda Klaichai (THA)
- 1965: Mary Rajamani (MAS)
- 1967: Yimploy Busabong (THA)
- 1969: Khin Pu (BIR)
- 1971: Meas Kheng (KHM)
- 1973: Glory Barnabas (SIN)
- 1975: Than Than Lwin (BIR)
- 1977: Than Than Lwin (BIR)
- 1979: Henny Maspaitella (INA)
- 1981: Lydia de Vega (PHI)
- 1983: Lydia de Vega (PHI)
- 1985: Ratjai Sripet (THA)
- 1987: Lydia de Vega (PHI)
- 1989: Ratjai Sripet (THA)
- 1991: Shanti Govindasamy (MAS)
- 1993: Lydia de Vega (PHI)
- 1995: Elma Muros (PHI)
- 1997: Shanti Govindasamy (MAS)
- 1999: Irene Joseph (INA)
- 2001: Supavadee Khawpeag (THA)
- 2003: Nguyen Thi Tinh (VIE)
- 2005: Kay Khine Lwin (MYA)

=== Women's 400 metres ===
- 1959: Ratana Supradita (THA)
- 1961: Chinda Klaichai (THA)
- 1965: Mary Rajamani (MAS)
- 1967: Mary Rajamani (MAS)
- 1969: Noreen Pein (BIR)
- 1971: Junaida Aman (MAS)
- 1973: Than Than Lwin (BIR)
- 1975: Chee Swee Lee (SIN)
- 1977: Than Than Lwin (BIR)
- 1979: Than Than Lwin (BIR)
- 1981: Lydia de Vega (PHI)
- 1983: Emma Tahapary (INA)
- 1985: Reawadee Srithoa (THA)
- 1987: Josephine Mary Singarayar (MAS)
- 1989: Sriprai Chaikaew (THA)
- 1991: Noodang Pimpol (THA)
- 1993: Noodang Pimpol (THA)
- 1995: Noodang Pimpol (THA)
- 1997: Nadarajah Manimagalay (MAS)
- 1999: Nadarajah Manimagalay (MAS)
- 2001: Wassana Winatho (THA)
- 2003: Nguyen Thi Tinh (VIE)
- 2005: Yin Yin Khine (MYA)

=== Women's 800 metres ===
- 1965: Mary Rajamani (MAS)
- 1967: Mary Rajamani (MAS)
- 1969: Nu Nu Yeh (BIR)
- 1971: Nu Nu Yeh (BIR)
- 1973: Mar Mar Min (BIR)
- 1975: Chee Swee Lee (SIN)
- 1977: Than Than Lwin (BIR)
- 1979: Than Than Lwin (BIR)
- 1981: Vengadasalam Angamah (MAS)
- 1983: Lucena Alam (PHI)
- 1985: Sasithorn Chantanuhong (THA)
- 1987: Josephine Mary Singarayar (MAS)
- 1989: Khin Khin Htwe (MYA)
- 1991: Sukanya Sang-Nguen (THA)
- 1993: Esther Sumah Suwadi (INA)
- 1995: Saipan Suetrong (THA)
- 1997: Esther Sumah Suwadi (INA)
- 1999: Pham Dinh Khanh Doan (VIE)
- 2001: Pham Dinh Khanh Doan (VIE)
- 2003: Do Thi Bong (VIE)
- 2005: Do Thi Bong (VIE)

=== Women's 1500 metres ===
- 1971: Amporn Tongsane (THA)
- 1973: Nu Nu Yeh (BIR)
- 1975: Mya Mya Khin (BIR)
- 1977: Kandasamy Jayamani (SIN)
- 1979: Kandasamy Jayamani (SIN)
- 1981: Than Than Lwin (BIR)
- 1983: Mar Mar Min (BIR)
- 1985: Sasithorn Chantanuhong (THA)
- 1987: Charin Suanangrong (THA)
- 1989: Khin Khin Htwe (MYA)
- 1991: Khin Khin Htwe (MYA)
- 1993: Marietta Tabangin (PHI)
- 1995: Khin Khin Htwe (MYA)
- 1997: Supriyati Sutono (INA)
- 1999: Supriyati Sutono (INA)
- 2001: Pham Dinh Khanh Doan (VIE)
- 2003: Nguyen Lan Anh (VIE)
- 2005: Trương Thanh Hằng (VIE)

=== Women's 3000 metres ===
- 1977: Kandasamy Jayamani (SIN)
- 1979: Kandasamy Jayamani (SIN)
- 1981: Khaw Ja (BIR)
- 1983: Mar Mar Min (BIR)
- 1985: Khin Khin Htwe (BIR)
- 1987: Khin Khin Htwe (BIR)
- 1989: Khin Khin Htwe (MYA)
- 1991: Palaniappan Jayanthi (MAS)
- 1993: Palaniappan Jayanthi (MAS)
- 1995: Khin Khin Htwe (MYA)

=== Women's 5000 metres ===
- 1987: Khin Khin Htwe (BIR)
- 1989: Not held
- 1991: Not held
- 1993: Not held
- 1995: Not held
- 1997: Supriyati Sutono (INA)
- 1999: Supriyati Sutono (INA)
- 2001: Supriyati Sutono (INA)
- 2003: Supriyati Sutono (INA)
- 2005: Oliva Sadi (INA)

=== Women's 10,000 metres ===
- 1987: Mar Mar Min (BIR)
- 1989: Mar Mar Min (MYA)
- 1991: Khin Khin Htwe (MYA)
- 1993: Palaniappan Jayanthi (MAS)
- 1995: Rumini Sudragni (INA)
- 1997: Supriyati Sutono (INA)
- 1999: Yuan Yufang (MAS)
- 2001: Supriyati Sutono (INA)
- 2003: Doan Nu Truc Van (VIE)
- 2005: Mercedita Manipol (PHI)

=== Women's marathon ===
- 1983: Kandasamy Jayamani (SIN)
- 1985: Weik Pan (BIR)
- 1987: Mar Mar Min (BIR)
- 1989: Marija Suryati (INA)
- 1991: Maria Lawalata (INA)
- 1993: Marija Suryati (INA)
- 1995: Ruwiyati (INA)
- 1997: Ruwiyati (INA)
- 1999: Not held
- 2001: Christabel Martes (PHI)
- 2003: Erni Ulatingsih (INA)
- 2005: Christabel Martes (PHI)

=== Women's 80 metres hurdles ===
- 1959: Gracie Carr (BIR)
- 1961: Lily Tan (Malaya)
- 1965: Kueh Swee Hong (MAS)
- 1967: Heather Siddons (SIN)

=== Women's 100 metres hurdles ===
- 1969: Gan Bee Hwa (SIN)
- 1971: San San Aye (BIR)
- 1973: Heather Merican (SIN)
- 1975: Nwe Nwe Yee (BIR)
- 1977: Marina Chin Leng Sim (MAS)
- 1979: Marina Chin Leng Sim (MAS)
- 1981: Nwe Nwe Yee (BIR)
- 1983: Agrifina de la Cruz (PHI)
- 1985: Agrifina de la Cruz (PHI)
- 1987: Agrifina de la Cruz (PHI)
- 1989: Elma Muros (PHI)
- 1991: Elma Muros (PHI)
- 1993: Martini Kustiah (INA)
- 1995: Vu Thi Bich Huang (VIE)
- 1997: Reawadee Srithoa (THA)
- 1999: Trecia Roberts (THA)
- 2001: Trecia Roberts (THA)
- 2003: Trecia Roberts (THA)
- 2005: Moh Siew Wei (MAS)

=== Women's 200 metres hurdles ===
- 1971: Chong Soo Luan (MAS)
- 1973: Heather Merican (SIN)
- 1975: Heather Merican (SIN)
- 1977: Marina Chin Leng Sim (MAS)

=== Women's 400 metres hurdles ===
- 1977: Law Kiu Ee (MAS)
- 1979: Than Than Lwin (BIR)
- 1981: Than Than Lwin (BIR)
- 1983: Agrifina de la Cruz (PHI)
- 1985: Agrifina de la Cruz (PHI)
- 1987: Nenita Adan (PHI)
- 1989: Sukanya Sang-Nguen (THA)
- 1991: Reawadee Srithoa (THA)
- 1993: Elma Muros (PHI)
- 1995: Saleerat Srimek (THA)
- 1997: Reawadee Srithoa (THA)
- 1999: Noraseela Mohd Khalid (MAS)
- 2001: Wassana Winatho (THA)
- 2003: Noraseela Mohd Khalid (MAS)
- 2005: Wassana Winatho (THA)

=== Women's high jump ===
- 1959: Myint Myint Aye (BIR)
- 1961: Tipparpan Leenasana (THA)
- 1965: Cheong Wai Hing (SIN)
- 1967: Barbara Kyaw Bwa (BIR)
- 1969: Barbara Kyaw Bwa (BIR)
- 1971: Eileen Chit (BIR)
- 1973: Gladys Chai von der Laage (MAS)
- 1975: Gladys Chai von der Laage (MAS)
- 1977: Eileen Chit (BIR)
- 1979: Gladys Chai von der Laage (MAS)
- 1981: Vannipa Yeepracha (THA)
- 1983: Vannipa Yeepracha (THA)
- 1985: San San Aye (BIR)
- 1987: Sangkokorn Rangpodok (THA)
- 1989: Khin Ohn (MYA)
- 1991: Jaruwan Jenjudkarn (THA)
- 1993: Jaruwan Jenjudkarn (THA)
- 1995: Rasamee Taemsri (THA)
- 1997: Achalakorn Kerdchang (THA)
- 1999: Netnapa Thaiging (THA)
- 2001: Netnapa Thaiging (THA)
- 2003: Noengrothai Chaipetch (THA)
- 2005: Bùi Thị Nhung (VIE)

=== Women's pole vault ===
- 2001: Ni Putu Desi Margawati (INA)
- 2003: Ni Putu Desi Margawati (INA)
- 2005: Roslinda Samsu (MAS)

=== Women's long jump ===
Games	Gold	Silver	Bronze
1959 Bangkok	Maureen Ann Lee (Malaya)		
1961 Rangoon	Maureen Ann Lee (Malaya)		
1965 Rangoon	Gracie Carr (BIR)		
1967 Bangkok	Suchtra Vachareenrong (THA)		
1969 Rangoon	Aye Shwe (BIR)		
1971 Kuala Lumpur	Mona Chin (MAS)		
1973 Singapore	Aye Shwe (BIR)	Gladys Chai (MAS)	Koh Hong Phang (SIN)
1975 Bangkok	Eileen Chit (BIR)		
1977 Kuala Lumpur	Aye Shwe (BIR)	Lydia Silva-Netto (PHI)	Eileen Chit (BIR)
1979 Jakarta	Mra Thruza (BIR)		
1981 Manila	San San Aye (BIR)	Mra Thuza (BIR)	Zaiton Othman (MAS)
1983 Singapore	Elma Muros (PHI)	San San Aye (BIR)	Can Swee Hua (MAS)
1985 Bangkok	Elma Muros (PHI)	Arunee Supaluek (THA)	San San Aye (BIR)
1987 Jakarta	Lydia de Vega (PHI)	Doris Chong (MAS)	Somboon Wataporn (THA)
1989 Kuala Lumpur	Elma Muros (PHI)		
1991 Manila	Elma Muros (PHI)		
1993 Singapore	Elma Muros (PHI)		
1995 Chiang Mai	Elma Muros (PHI)		
1997 Jakarta	Elma Muros (PHI)		
1999 Bandar Seri Begawan	Elma Muros (PHI)		
2001 Kuala Lumpur	Phan Thi Thu Lan (VIE)	Lerma Bulauitan (PHI)	Nguyễn Thị Bích Vân (VIE)
2003 Hanoi	Lerma Bulauitan (PHI)	Wacharee Ritthiwat (THA)	Bùi Thị Nhật Thanh (VIE)
2005 Manila	Marestella Torres (PHI)	Lerma Bulauitan (PHI)	Sin Mei Ngew (MAS)
2007 Nakhon Ratchasima	Marestella Torres (PHI)	Thitima Muangjan (THA)	Sin Mei Ngew (MAS)
2009 Vientiane	Marestella Torres (PHI)	Thitima Muangjan (THA)	Maria Natalia Londa (INA)
2011 Palembang	Marestella Torres (PHI)	Maria Natalia Londa (INA)	Katherine Santos (PHI)
2013 Naypyidaw	Maria Natalia Londa (INA)	Thitima Muangjan (THA)	Bùi Thị Thu Thảo (VIE)
2015 Singapore	Maria Natalia Londa (INA)	Bùi Thị Thu Thảo (VIE)	Marestella Torres (PHI)
2017 Kuala Lumpur	Bùi Thị Thu Thảo (VIE)	Maria Natalia Londa (INA)	Marestella Torres (PHI)
2019 Philippines	Maria Natalia Londa (INA)	Parinya Chuaimaroeng (THA)	Vũ Thị Mộng Mơ (VIE)
2021 Hanoi	Vũ Thị Ngọc Hà (VIE)	Bùi Thị Thu Thảo (VIE)	Maria Natalia Londa (INA)

=== Women's triple jump ===
- 1995: Wacharee Ritthiwat (THA)
- 1997: Wacharee Ritthiwat (THA)
- 1999: Sunisa Kaewrungruang (THA)
- 2001: Wacharee Ritthiwat (THA)
- 2003: Wacharee Ritthiwat (THA)
- 2005: Ngew Sin Mei (MAS)

=== Women's shot put ===
- 1959: Kusolwan Saracha (THA)
- 1961: Pranee Kitipongpithaya (THA)
- 1965: Khin Tarr (BIR)
- 1967: Jennifer Tin Lay (BIR)
- 1969: Jennifer Tin Lay (BIR)
- 1971: Jennifer Tin Lay (BIR)
- 1973: Jennifer Tin Lay (BIR)
- 1975: Jennifer Tin Lay (BIR)
- 1977: Jennifer Tin Lay (BIR)
- 1979: Jennifer Tin Lay (BIR)
- 1981: Jennifer Tin Lay (BIR)
- 1983: Jennifer Tin Lay (BIR)
- 1985: Yosephine Mahuse (INA)
- 1987: Yosephine Mahuse (INA)
- 1989: Lee Chiew Ha (MAS)
- 1991: Lee Chiew Ha (MAS)
- 1993: Sunisa Yooyao (THA)
- 1995: Sunisa Yooyao (THA)
- 1997: Juttaporn Krasaeyan (THA)
- 1999: Juttaporn Krasaeyan (THA)
- 2001: Juttaporn Krasaeyan (THA)
- 2003: Du Xianhui (SIN)
- 2005: Zhang Guirong (SIN)

=== Women's discus throw ===
- 1959: Poonsri Songpia (THA)
- 1961: Khin Htay (BIR)
- 1965: Pranee Kitipongpithaya (THA)
- 1967: Pranee Kitipongpithaya (THA)
- 1969: Paw Shwe (BIR)
- 1971: Uch Lay (KHM)
- 1973: Jennifer Tin Lay (BIR)
- 1975: Jennifer Tin Lay (BIR)
- 1977: Jennifer Tin Lay (BIR)
- 1979: Jennifer Tin Lay (BIR)
- 1981: Jennifer Tin Lay (BIR)
- 1983: Jennifer Tin Lay (BIR)
- 1985: Juliana Effendi (INA)
- 1987: Juliana Effendi (INA)
- 1989: Juliana Effendi (INA)
- 1991: Aye Aye Nwe (MYA)
- 1993: Aye Aye Nwe (MYA)
- 1995: Sunisa Yooyao (THA)
- 1997: Juttaporn Krasaeyan (THA)
- 1999: Juttaporn Krasaeyan (THA)
- 2001: Juttaporn Krasaeyan (THA)
- 2003: Zhang Guirong (SIN)
- 2005: Du Xianhui (SIN)

=== Women's hammer throw ===
- 2001: Benjamas Ounkaew (THA)
- 2003: Yurita Ariani Arsyad (INA)
- 2005: Siti Shahidah Abdullah (MAS)

=== Women's javelin throw ===
- 1959: Khin Khin Htwe (BIR)
- 1961: Ma Nan Yin (BIR)
- 1965: Nol Kan (CAM)
- 1967: Khin Khin Htwe (BIR)
- 1969: Khin Pu (BIR)
- 1971: Eang Sin (KHM)
- 1973: Proch Thin (KHM)
- 1975: Vallee Tanachai (THA)
- 1977: Erlinda Lavandia (PHI)
- 1979: Erlinda Lavandia (PHI)
- 1981: Erlinda Lavandia (PHI)
- 1983: Norsham Yoon (MAS)
- 1985: Erlinda Lavandia (PHI)
- 1987: Tati Ratnaningsih (INA)
- 1989: Norsham Yoon (MAS)
- 1991: Tati Ratnaningsih (INA)
- 1993: Tati Ratnaningsih (INA)
- 1995: Chartwadee Soonthorn (THA)
- 1997: Chartwadee Soonthorn (THA)
- 1999: Chartwadee Soonthorn (THA)
- 2001: Buoban Pamang (THA)
- 2003: Buoban Pamang (THA)
- 2005: Buoban Pamang (THA)

=== Women's pentathlon ===
- 1965: Kim Mom (CAM)
- 1967: Cheong Wai Hing (SIN)
- 1969: Tin Pu (BIR)
- 1971: Paramasiva Savithri (MAS)
- 1973: Gladys Chai von der Laage (MAS)
- 1975: Gladys Chai von der Laage (MAS)
- 1977: Vannipa Sangsavang (THA)
- 1979: Vannipa Sangsavang (THA)

=== Women's heptathlon ===
- 1981: Zaiton Othman (MAS)
- 1983: Zaiton Othman (MAS)
- 1985: Nene Gamo (PHI)
- 1987: Yublina Mangi (INA)
- 1989: Zaiton Othman (MAS)
- 1991: Nene Pellosis (PHI)
- 1993: Rumini (INA)
- 1995: ?
- 1997: Elma Muros (PHI)
- 1999: Wassana Winatho (THA)
- 2001: Elma Muros (PHI)
- 2003: Nguyen Thi Thu Cuc (VIE)
- 2005: Nguyen Thi Thu Cuc (VIE)

=== Women's 5000 metres walk ===
- 1977: Su Su Yeh (BIR)
- 1979: Nwe Nwe Aye (BIR)
- 1981: Su Su Yeh (BIR)
- 1983: Win Win (BIR)
- 1985: Iece Magdalena Siregar (INA)
- 1987: Iece Magdalena Siregar (INA)
- 1989: Ma Kyin Lwan (MYA)
- 1991: Ma Kyin Lwan (MYA)
- 1993: Hasiati Lawole (INA)
- 1995: Anastasia Karen Silvaraj (MAS)

=== Women's 10,000 metres walk ===
- 1977: Salmiah Kalaimaney (MAS)
- 1979: Paramasivam Sakthirani (MAS)
- 1981: Paramasivam Sakthirani (MAS)
- 1983: Su Su Yeh (BIR)
- 1985: Not held
- 1987: Ma Hla Shwe (BIR)
- 1989: Hasiati Lawole (INA)
- 1991: Ma Kyin Lwan (MYA)
- 1993: Cheng Tong Lean (MAS)
- 1995: ?
- 1997: Anastasia Karen Silvaraj (MAS)
- 1999: Yuan Yufang (MAS)

=== Women's 20 kilometres walk ===
- 2001: Yuan Yufang (MAS)
- 2003: Yuan Yufang (MAS)
- 2005: Yuan Yufang (MAS)

=== Women's 4 × 100 metres relay ===
- 1959: Thailand (THA)
- 1961: Thailand (THA)
- 1965: Thailand (THA)
- 1967: Malaysia (MAS)
- 1969: Burma (BIR)
- 1971: Malaysia (MAS)
- 1973: Singapore (SIN)
- 1975: Malaysia (MAS)
- 1977: Thailand (THA)
- 1979: Thailand (THA)
- 1981: Malaysia (MAS)
- 1983: Thailand (THA)
- 1985: Thailand (THA)
- 1987: Thailand (THA)
- 1989: Thailand (THA)
- 1991: Thailand (THA)
- 1993: Thailand (THA)
- 1995: Thailand (THA)
- 1997: Thailand (THA)
- 1999: Thailand (THA)
- 2001: Thailand (THA)
- 2003: Thailand (THA)
- 2005: Thailand (THA)

=== Women's 4 × 200 metres relay ===
- 1995: Thailand (THA)

=== Women's 4 × 400 metres relay ===
- 1971: Malaysia (MAS)
- 1973: Burma (BIR)
- 1975: Burma (BIR)
- 1977: Burma (BIR)
- 1979: Malaysia (MAS)
- 1981: Malaysia (MAS)
- 1983: Thailand (THA)
- 1985: Thailand (THA)
- 1987: Malaysia (MAS)
- 1989: Thailand (THA)
- 1991: Thailand (THA)
- 1993: Malaysia (MAS)
- 1995: Thailand (THA)
- 1997: Thailand (THA)
- 1999: Thailand (THA)
- 2001: Thailand (THA)
- 2003: Vietnam (VIE)
- 2005: Myanmar (MYA)
