= Athletics at the 1965 SEAP Games =

The athletics competition at the 1965 SEAP Games were held at the Stadium Merdeka, Malaysia. Athletics events was held between 15 December to 20 December.

== Medal summary ==
=== Men ===
Event	Gold		Silver		Bronze	
100 m	(Malaysia) Mani Jegathesan	10.5	(Malaysia) Tambusamy Krishnan	10.8	(Thailand) Thaviksadi Booranaklas	10.9
200 m	(Malaysia) Mani Jegathesan	21.3 CR	(Malaysia) Rajalingam Gunaratnam	21.7	(Singapore) Natahar Bava	22.3
400 m	(Malaysia) Victor Asirvatham	48.0 CR	(Malaysia) A. S. Nathan	48.1	(Thailand) Somsak Thongsuk	48.8
800 m	(Malaysia) Ramasamy Subramaniam	1:51.5 CR	(Thailand) Nipon Pensuvapap	1:51.6	(Thailand) Tira Klai-Angtong	1:54.6
1.500 m	(Malaysia) Ramasamy Subramaniam	3:55.8 CR	(Thailand) Tira Klai-Angtong	3:59.6	(Malaysia) Mustan Singh	4:00.0
5.000 m	(Malaysia) Dilbagh Singh Kler	15:34.0 CR	(Singapore) Parameswaran Pillai	15:37.4	(Cambodia) Nhea Khay	15:38.2
10.000 m	(Myanmar) Thin Sumbwegam	33:20.4	(Myanmar) Myitung Naw	33:24.6	(Malaysia) Dilbagh Singh Kler	33:45.0
Marathon	(Myanmar) Thin Sumbwegam	3 hrs:06:20	(Malaysia) J. Marimuthu	3 hrs:22:07	(Singapore) Parameswaran Pillai	3 hrs:26:22
3.000 m steeplechase	(Malaysia) Dilbagh Singh Kler	9:37.8	(Singapore) Major Singh	9:43.0	(Thailand) Rauangnorong	10:04.0
110 m hurdles	(Singapore) Osman Merican	14.5 CR	(Singapore) Wong Fey Wan	14.7	(Cambodia) Pech Iv	15.2
400 m hurdles	(Singapore) Migale Gunasena	53.8 CR	(Malaysia) V. Velayuthan	53.9	(Thailand) Somchaya Mahasinanont	54.2
4 × 100 m relay	Malaysia Rajalingam Gunaratnam; Tambusamy Krishnan; Ariffin; Mani Jegathesan	41.4 CR	Singapore	41.5	Thailand	42.5
1.600 m relay	Malaysia Mani Jegathesan; A. S. Nathan; Karu Selvaratnam; Victor Asirvatham	3:13.2 CR	Thailand	3:17.0	Singapore	3:22.9
Pole Vault	(Myanmar) Soe Mra	3.89 m CR	(Malaysia) F. Marciano	3.67	(Singapore) Pal Singh	3.67
High Jump	(Thailand) Kateseperswasdi Bhakdikul	1.94 m CR	(Malaysia) Tan Ghee Lin	1.90	(Malaysia) Too Teng Hong	1.84
Long Jump	(Malaysia) Kaimar-ud-Din bin Maidin	7.26 m CR	(Thailand) C. Thipyalert	7.10	(Cambodia) Duong Sokhon	6.87
Triple Jump	(Malaysia) Kaimar-ud-Din bin Maidin	15.19 m CR	(Malaysia) Ahmad Mahmud	14.85	(Myanmar) Kyaw Nyunt	14.40
Shot put	(Malaysia) Nashatar Singh Sidhu	14.09 m CR	(Myanmar) Thein Win	13.42	(Thailand) S. Tongkao	13.20
Discus Throw	(Malaysia) Danapal Naidu	43.18 m	(Malaysia) M. Dattaya	41.26	(Cambodia) Nhem Yeav	38.74
Hammer Throw	(Singapore) Eknath Mane	47.02 m	(Malaysia) Ghonda Singh	38.78	(Malaysia) Swaran Singh	37.76
Javelin Throw	(Malaysia) Nashatar Singh Sidhu	71.56 m CR	(Malaysia) Tieh Teng Leng	57.80	(Thailand) Booncho Tongyam	55.02
Decathlon	(Thailand) Kateseperswasdi Bhakdikul	5.916 pts	(Cambodia) Tin Pin Thoeun	5.807	(Malaysia) Ahmad Mahmud	5.771

=== Women ===
Event	Gold		Silver		Bronze	
100 m	(Myanmar) Moe San	12.3	(Malaysia) Freda Gonzales	12.4	(Malaysia) Cherryl Doral	12.4
200 m	(Malaysia) Mary Rajamani	25.5 CR	(Thailand) Samruay Charonggool	25.8	(Thailand) Budsabong Yimploy	12.59
400 m	(Malaysia) Mary Rajamani	56.5 CR	(Thailand) Samruay Charonggool	58.2	(Thailand) Y. Numnoy	60.2
800 m	(Malaysia) Mary Rajamani	2:15.1	(Thailand) Samruay Charonggool	2:19.4	(Malaysia) Chong Mei Ling	2:23.4
80 m hurdles	(Malaysia) Kueh Swee Hong	11.9 CR	(Malaysia) Rajemah Seikh Ahmad	11.9	(Myanmar) Gracie Carr	12.2
400 m relay	Malaysia	49.3 CR	Singapore	50.2	Cambodia	50.2
High jump	(Singapore) Cheong Wai Hing	1.52 m CR	(Myanmar) Myint Myint Aye	1.48	(Malaysia) Mudlifah Yusoff	1.42
Long jump	(Myanmar) Gracie Carr	5.64 m CR	(Cambodia) Kim Mom	5.58	(Myanmar) Nyo Nyo	5.22
Shot put	(Myanmar) Khin Tarr	10.61 m CR	(Cambodia) Ouch Lay	10.58	(Thailand) Pranee Kitipongpitaya	10.46
Discus throw	(Thailand) Pranee Kitipongpitaya	37.20 m CR	(Cambodia) Ouch Lay	36.76	(Cambodia) Mok Siphan	36.22
Javelin throw	(Cambodia) Nol Kan	38.16 m CR	(Myanmar) Khin Khin Htwe	36.86	(Malaysia) Wong Mong Yun	33.60
Pentathlon	(Cambodia) Kim Mom	3.557 pts	(Malaysia) Marie Nair	3.517	(Singapore) Cheong Wai Hing	3.499

== Medal table ==
Rank	Nation	Gold	Silver	Bronze	Total
1	Malaysia (MAS)	19	14	9	42
2	Burma (BIR)	6	4	3	13
3	Singapore (SIN)	4	5	5	14
4	Thailand (THA)	3	7	11	21
5	Cambodia (CAM)	2	4	6	12
Totals (5 entries)		34	34	34	102
