= Malaysia at the Asian Games =

- IOC code: MAS
- NOC: Olympic Council of Malaysia
- Medals Ranked 12th: Gold 78 Silver 116 Bronze 182 Total 376

Summer appearances
- 1954; 1958; 1962; 1966; 1970; 1974; 1978; 1982; 1986; 1990; 1994; 1998; 2002; 2006; 2010; 2014; 2018; 2022; 2026

Winter appearances
- 2007; 2011; 2017; 2025; 2029

Other related appearances
- North Borneo (1954, 1958, 1962); Sarawak (1962)

Malaysia first competed at the Asian Games in 1954. Malaysia got its first gold medal in 1962 Asian Games, when Mani Jegathesan won the men's 200 metres athletics event on 28 August 1962.

== Asian Games ==
=== Medals by Games ===
Games	Rank	Gold	Silver	Bronze	Total
1954 Manila	0	0	0	0	0
1958 Tokyo	15	0	0	3	3
1962 Jakarta	8	2	4	9	15
1966 Bangkok	4	7	5	6	18
1970 Bangkok	7	5	1	7	13
1974 Tehran	17	0	1	4	5
1978 Bangkok	12	2	1	3	6
1982 New Delhi	15	1	0	3	4
1986 Seoul	14	0	5	5	10
1990 Beijing	10	2	2	4	8
1994 Hiroshima	9	4	2	13	19
1998 Bangkok	12	5	10	14	29
2002 Busan	12	6	8	16	30
2006 Doha	11	8	17	17	42
2010 Guangzhou	10	9	18	14	41
2014 Incheon	14	5	14	14	33
2018 Jakarta & Palembang	14	7	13	16	36
2022 Hangzhou	14	6	8	18	32
2026 Aichi-Nagoya	11	9	7	16	32
2030 Doha	Future event				
2034 Riyadh	Future event				
Total	12	78	116	182	376

=== Medals by sport ===
Sport	Rank	Gold	Silver	Bronze	Total
Archery	9	0	1	2	3
Athletics	16	8	8	21	37
Badminton	5	7	8	22	3
Bodybuilding	12	0	2	0	2
Bowling	3	12	13	7	32
Boxing	25	0	0	4	4
Cue sports	9	1	3	0	4
Cycling	9	5	7	11	23
Diving	7	0	9	21	30
Equestrian	11	1	4	6	11
Field hockey	6	0	2	7	9
Football	16	0	0	2	2
Gymnastics	12	0	1	1	2
Karate	3	11	9	18	38
Sailing	8	5	9	10	24
Sepaktakraw	3	5	11	5	21
Shooting	20	0	3	3	6
Squash	1	18	7	11	36
Swimming	10	1	5	3	9
Taekwondo	16	0	2	7	9
Tennis	17	0	0	2	2
Weightlifting	23	0	0	1	1
Wushu	7	3	2	7	12
Total	13	78	88	132	276

=== Medals by individual ===
Athlete	Sport	Years	Gender	Gold	Silver	Bronze	Total
Nicol David	Squash	1998–2018	F	7	1	1	9
Shalin Zulkifli	Bowling	1994–2018	F	4	3	2	9
Mani Jegathesan	Athletics	1962–1966	M	4	2	1	7
Ng Boon Bee	Badminton	1962–1970	M	4	1	2	7
Esther Cheah	Bowling	2006–2018	F	3	4	1	8
Ong Beng Hee	Squash	2002–2014	M	2	2	2	6
Low Wee Wern	Squash	2010–2018	F	2	1	2	5
Azizulhasni Awang	Cycling	2010–2026	M	3	1	2	6
Puvaneswaran Ramasamy	Karate	2002–2010	M	2	1	1	4
Sivasangari Subramaniam	Squash	2018-2026	F	4	1	1	6
Tan Yee Khan	Badminton	1962–1966	M	2	1	1	4
Alex Liew	Bowling	2010	M	2	1	0	3
Punch Gunalan	Badminton	1970	M	2	0	1	3
Ng Eain Yow	Squash	2018-2026	M	4	0	1	5
Wendy Chai	Bowling	2002–2006	F	2	0	1	3
Abdul Malek Shamsuddin	Sepaktakraw	1990	M	2	0	0	2
Chai Fong Ying	Wushu	2006–2010	F	2	0	0	2
Delia Arnold	Squash	2010–2014	F	2	0	0	2
Noor Rani Adnan	Sepaktakraw	1990	M	2	0	0	2
Nordin Sabaruddin	Sepaktakraw	1990	M	2	0	0	2
Rehan Mohamed Din	Sepaktakraw	1990	M	2	0	0	2
Rachel Arnold	Squash	2022-2026	F	2	0	1	3
Ameeshenraj Chandaran	Squash	2026	M	1	0	1	2
Nurul Izzah Izzati	Cycling - Track	2022-2026	F	0	1	2	3

=== Records ===
Type	Sport	Events	Athlete / Team	Games	Result
NR	Swimming	Men's 200 metre backstroke	Alex Lim	1998 Bangkok	2:00.94
NR	Athletics	Men's 110 metres hurdles	Nur Herman Majid	1994 Hiroshima	13.73
NR	Athletics	Women's 800 metres	Josephine Mary	1986 Seoul	2:07.44

Key

- WR = World record
- GR = Games record
- AS = Asian record
- NR = National record

== Asian Winter Games ==
=== Medals by Games ===
Games	Rank	Gold	Silver	Bronze	Total
2007 Changchun	0	0	0	0	0
2011 Astana / Almaty	0	0	0	0	0
2017 Sapporo / Obihiro	0	0	0	0	0
2025 Harbin	0	0	0	0	0
2029 Trojena	Future event				
Total	0	0	0	0	0

== Asian Indoor and Martial Arts Games ==
Malaysia at the Asian Indoor and Martial Arts Games
- IOC code: MAS
- NOC: Olympic Council of Malaysia
- Medals Ranked 22nd: Gold 6 Silver 13 Bronze 19 Total 38

Asian Indoor and Martial Arts Games appearances
- 2005; 2007; 2009; 2013; 2017; 2021; 2026

=== Medals by Games ===
Games	Rank	Gold	Silver	Bronze	Total
Asian Indoor Games
2005 Bangkok	16	1	0	0	1
2007 Macau	20	0	3	6	9
2009 Hanoi	15	3	5	8	16
Asian Martial Arts Games
2009 Bangkok	14	2	3	3	8
Asian Indoor and Martial Arts Games
2013 Incheon	22	0	1	2	3
2017 Ashgabat	29	0	1	0	1
Total		6	13	19	38

=== Medals by sport ===
Sport	Rank	Gold	Silver	Bronze	Total
Bowling	6	0	4	3	7
Chess	10	0	0	2	2
Dragon and lion dance	3	1	3	1	5
Electronic sports	9	0	0	1	1
Extreme sports	4	1	1	2	4
Karate	6	1	0	1	2
Muay	23	0	0	1	1
Pétanque	6	0	0	1	1
Pencak silat	4	3	4	7	14
Total		6	12	19	37

== Asian Beach Games ==
Malaysia at the Asian Beach Games
- IOC code: MAS
- NOC: Olympic Council of Malaysia
- Medals Ranked 16th: Gold 6 Silver 17 Bronze 20 Total 43

Asian Beach Games appearances
- 2008; 2010; 2012; 2014; 2016; 2026

=== Medals by Games ===
Games	Rank	Gold	Silver	Bronze	Total
2008 Bali	10	2	2	6	10
2010 Muscat	12	1	1	0	12
2012 Haiyang	0	0	0	0	0
2014 Phuket	27	0	8	8	16
2016 Danang	10	3	6	5	14
2026 Sanya	26	0	0	1	1
Total	16	6	17	20	43

=== Medals by sport ===
Sport	Rank	Gold	Silver	Bronze	Total
3-on-3 basketball	10	0	0	1	1
Beach sepaktakraw	12	0	0	2	2
Beach woodball	4	1	1	2	4
Bodybuilding	9	1	0	0	1
Extreme sports	5	0	1	1	2
Footvolley	3	0	0	1	1
Muay	13	0	0	3	3
Pencak silat	3	4	5	4	13
Pétanque	5	0	5	5	10
Sailing	7	0	4	1	5
Waterskiing	9	0	1	0	1
Total	16	6	17	20	43

== Asian Youth Games ==
Malaysia at the Asian Youth Games
- IOC code: MAS
- NOC: Olympic Council of Malaysia
- Medals Ranked 12th: Gold 4 Silver 6 Bronze 8 Total 18

Asian Youth Games appearances
- 2009; 2013; 2025

=== Medals by Games ===
Games	Rank	Gold	Silver	Bronze	Total
2009 Singapore	21	0	0	1	1
2013 Nanjing	8	4	6	7	17
2021 Shantou	Cancelled due to the COVID-19 pandemic				
2025 Tashkent	Future event				
2029 Phnom Penh	Future event				
Total	12	4	6	8	18

=== Medals by sport ===
Sport	Rank	Gold	Silver	Bronze	Total
Athletics	18	0	1	2	3
Badminton	5	0	0	1	1
Diving	4	0	1	0	1
Sailing	4	0	0	1	1
Squash	1	3	1	1	5
Swimming	11	1	3	3	7
Total	12	4	6	8	18

== Other Appearances ==
Includes Malaysia participation and results in Southeast Asian and inter-continental level competitions such as Southeast Asian Games, ASEAN Para Games, ASEAN University Games, ASEAN School Games, Afro-Asian Games, FESPIC Games, and FESPIC Youth Games.

=== Southeast Asian Games ===
*Red border color indicates tournament was held on home soil.

==== Medals by Games ====
Games	Rank	1st place, gold medalist(s)	2nd place, silver medalist(s)	3rd place, bronze medalist(s)	Total
Southeast Asian Peninsular Games
1959 Bangkok	3	8	15	11	34
1961 Rangoon	3	16	24	39	79
1965 Kuala Lumpur	2	33	36	28	97
1967 Bangkok	3	23	29	43	95
1969 Rangoon	4	16	24	39	79
1971 Kuala Lumpur	2	41	43	55	139
1973 Singapore	3	30	35	50	115
1975 Bangkok	4	27	49	51	127
Southeast Asian Games
1977 Kuala Lumpur	5	21	17	21	59
1979 Jakarta	5	19	23	39	81
1981 Manila	4	16	27	31	74
1983 Singapore	6	16	25	40	81
1985 Bangkok	4	26	28	32	86
1987 Jakarta	4	35	41	67	143
1989 Kuala Lumpur	2	67	58	75	200
1991 Manila	4	36	38	65	139
1993 Singapore	5	43	45	65	153
1995 Chiang Mai	4	31	49	69	149
1997 Jakarta	3	55	68	75	198
1999 Bandar Seri Begawan	2	57	45	42	144
2001 Kuala Lumpur	1	111	98	86	295
2003 Hanoi / Ho Chi Minh City	5	43	42	59	144
2005 Manila	4	61	49	65	175
2007 Nakhon Ratchasima	2	68	52	96	216
2009 Vientiane	4	40	40	59	139
2011 Palembang / Jakarta	4	59	50	81	190
2013 Naypyidaw	5	43	38	77	158
2015 Singapore	4	62	58	66	186
2017 Kuala Lumpur	1	145	92	86	323
2019 Davao City	5	55	58	71	184
2021 Hanoi	6	39	45	90	174
2023 Phnom Penh	7				
2025 Thailand	Future event				
Total	3	1250	1215	1612	4076

==== Medals by sport ====
Sport	Rank	1st place, gold medalist(s)	2nd place, silver medalist(s)	3rd place, bronze medalist(s)	Total
Archery	0	20	23	10	53
Athletics	0	67	45	66	178
Badminton	2	46	55	98	199
Basketball	2	15	8	7	30
Billiards and snooker	7	3	6	10	19
Bodybuilding	0	1	2	0	3
Bowling	0	24	14	22	60
Boxing	0	1	1	1	3
Chess	0	0	0	2	2
Cricket	0	1	1	1	3
Cycling	0	30	21	13	64
Diving	1	61	26	14	101
Equestrian	0	14	7	4	25
Fencing	0	2	0	9	11
Field hockey	0	6	0	0	6
Figure skating	0	1	0	1	2
Floorball	0	0	0	1	1
Football	2	6	7	7	20
Futsal	0	0	1	1	2
Golf	0	0	1	6	7
Gymnastics	0	59	43	25	127
Ice hockey	0	0	0	1	1
Indoor hockey	0	1	0	1	2
Judo	0	0	2	23	25
Karate	0	44	25	33	102
Lawn bowls	0	7	1	0	8
Muaythai	0	2	1	1	4
Netball	0	1	1	0	2
Pencak silat	0	32	12	40	84
Pétanque	0	3	5	17	25
Polo	0	2	0	0	2
Rowing	0	0	0	2	2
Rugby sevens	0	1	1	1	3
Sailing	0	18	18	16	52
Sepaktakraw	0	4	6	12	22
Short track speed skating	0	4	0	3	7
Shooting	0	14	32	28	69
Softball	0	0	0	1	1
Squash	0	13	8	3	24
Swimming	0	57	45	43	145
Synchronised swimming	0	8	5	0	13
Table tennis	0	8	11	24	43
Taekwondo	0	11	13	35	59
Tennis	5	0	1	10	11
Triathlon	0	2	2	1	5
Volleyball	6	0	0	1	1
Waterskiing	0	10	6	6	22
Water polo	0	0	0	1	1
Weightlifting	0	4	7	14	25
Wushu	0	25	23	30	78
Total	3	1250	1215	1612	4076

==== Medals by individual ====
Athlete	Sport	Years	Gender	Gold	Silver	Bronze	Total
Nurul Huda Abdullah	Swimming	1985–1989	F	22	4	1	27
Leong Mun Yee	Diving	1999–2017	F	17	5	5	27
Daniel Bego	Swimming	2003–2015	M	11	8	4	23
Rosalind Singha Ang	Badminton	1965–1975	F	10	9	0	19
Yeoh Ken Nee	Diving	2001–2011	M	10	1	0	11
Nashatar Singh Sidhu	Athletics	1965–1975	M	9	0	0	9
Sylvia Ng	Badminton	1969–1975	F	8	4	1	13
Mary Rajamani	Athletics	1965–1971	F	8	0	0	8
Mohamed Zaki Sadri	Athletics	1987–1997	M	8	0	0	8
Murusamy Ramachandran	Athletics	1993–1999	M	8	0	0	8
Ng Boon Bee	Badminton	1961–1971	M	7	2	1	10
Ooi Tze Liang	Diving	2011–2015	M	7	2	0	9
Katrina Ann Abdul Hadi	Synchronized swimming	2011–2015	F	6	2	0	8
Cheong Jun Hoong	Diving	2003–2015	F	6	1	2	9
Bryan Nickson Lomas	Diving	2005–2011	M	6	1	0	7
Nur Herman Majid	Athletics	1991–2001	M	6	0	0	6
Pandelela Rinong	Diving	2007–2015	F	6	0	0	6
Ramasamy Subramaniam	Athletics	1965–1971	M	6	0	0	6
Vellasamy Subramaniam	Athletics	1977–1985	M	6	0	0	6
Khoo Cai Lin	Swimming	2007–2015	F	5	7	5	17
Punch Gunalan	Badminton	1969–1973	M	5	3	1	9
Ng Shu Wai	Gymnastics	2003–2005	M	5	3	0	8
Lim Wen Chean	Gymnastics	2003–2007	F	5	2	0	7
Zulmazran Zulkifli	Bowling	2005–2011	M	5	1	5	11
Esther Cheah	Bowling	2005–2015	F	5	1	2	8
Gladys Chai Ng Mei	Athletics	1973–1979	F	5	0	0	5
Kamaruddin Maidin	Athletics	1959–1967	M	5	0	0	5
Loo Kum Zee	Athletics	1995–2003	M	5	0	0	5
Mani Jegathesan	Athletics	1961–1965	M	5	0	0	5
Png Hui Chuen	Synchronized swimming	2011	F	5	0	0	5

=== ASEAN University Games ===
*Red border color indicates tournament was held on home soil.

==== Medals by Games ====
Games	Rank	Gold	Silver	Bronze	Total
1981 Chiang Mai					
1982 Jakarta	3	7			
1984 Bangi					
1986 Singapore					
1988 Pattaya					
1990 Bandung	3	7			
1993 Shah Alam	2	34			
1994 Singapore	3	9			
1996 Bandar Seri Begawan					
1999 Bangkok	3	5	17	15	37
2002 Manila					
2004 Surabaya		10	18	25	53
2006 Hanoi	4	7	19	37	63
2008 Kuala Lumpur	1	90	79	47	216
2010 Chiang Mai	3	37	36	44	117
2012 Vientiane	1	60	48	72	180
2014 Palembang	3	40	42	49	131
2016 Singapore	3	27	31	35	93
2018 Naypyidaw	3	37	43	49	129
2022 Ubon Ratchathani	2	49	83	50	182
Total	3	333	289	324	889

=== ASEAN School Games ===
*Red border color indicates tournament was held on home soil.

==== Medals by Games ====
Games	Rank	Gold	Silver	Bronze	Total
2010 Kuala Lumpur	1	46	37	24	107
2011 Singapore	3	21	35	33	89
2012 Surabaya	3	29	36	35	100
2013 Hanoi	2	25	30	30	85
2014 Marikina	1	41	34	30	105
2015 Bandar Seri Begawan	2	20	14	22	56
2016 Chiang Mai	5	6	16	22	44
2017 Singapore	4	22	16	34	72
2018 Selangor	1	37	34	32	103
2019 Semarang	3	18	25	34	77
Total	2	188	202	196	586

=== ASEAN Para Games ===
*Red border color indicates tournament was held on home soil.

==== Medals by Games ====
Games	Rank	Gold	Silver	Bronze	Total
2001 Kuala Lumpur	1	143	136	92	371
2003 Hanoi	3	54	40	46	140
2005 Manila	3	75	40	26	141
2008 Nakhon Ratchasima	2	82	74	46	202
2009 Kuala Lumpur	2	94	81	71	246
2011 Surakarta	3	51	36	45	132
2014 Naypyidaw	3	50	49	41	140
2015 Singapore	3	52	58	37	147
2017 Kuala Lumpur	2	90	85	83	258
2020 Philippines	Cancelled due to the COVID-19 pandemic				
Total	2	691	599	487	1,777

=== Afro-Asian Games ===
==== Medals by Games ====
Games	Rank	Gold	Silver	Bronze	Total
2003 Hyderabad	17	0	0	2	2
Total	17	0	0	2	2

=== FESPIC Games ===
*Red border color indicates tournament was held on home soil.

==== Medals by Games ====
Games	Rank	Gold	Silver	Bronze	Total
1977 Parramatta					
2006 Kuala Lumpur	4	44	60	71	175
Total					

=== FESPIC Youth Games ===
==== Medals by Games ====
Games	Rank	Gold	Silver	Bronze	Total
2003 Hong Kong	2	36	36	27	99
Total	2	36	36	27	99

== See also ==
- Malaysia at the Olympics
- Malaysia at the Paralympics
- Malaysia at the Asian Para Games
- Malaysia at the Southeast Asian Games
- Malaysia at the Commonwealth Games
