= Malaysia at the SEA Games =

- IOC code: MAS
- NOC: Olympic Council of Malaysia
- Website: olympic.org.my
- Medals Ranked 3rd: Gold 1,433 Silver 1,420 Bronze 1,990 Total 4,843

SEA Games appearances (overview)
- 1959; 1961; 1965; 1967; 1969; 1971; 1973; 1975; 1977; 1979; 1981; 1983; 1985; 1987; 1989; 1991; 1993; 1995; 1997; 1999; 2001; 2003; 2005; 2007; 2009; 2011; 2013; 2015; 2017; 2019; 2021; 2023; 2025; 2027; 2029

Malaysia started sending athletes to the SEA Games in 1959 as a founding member of the Southeast Asian Games Federation (SEAGF) alongside Burma (now Myanmar), Kampuchea (now Cambodia), Laos, Thailand, and the Republic of Vietnam (South Vietnam). Later, Malaysia tendered a suggestion to expand the Southeast Asian Peninsula (SEAP) Games Federation by inviting other Southeast Asian countries such as Brunei, Indonesia, and the Philippines. These three new members were officially welcomed into the Federation on 5 February 1977. The 1977 SEA Games in Kuala Lumpur becomes the first games that bear the title Southeast Asian Games.

== Medals by games ==
*Red border color indicates tournament was held on home soil.

Games	Rank	1st place, gold medalist(s)	2nd place, silver medalist(s)	3rd place, bronze medalist(s)	Total
SEAP Games
1959 Bangkok	3	8	15	11	34
1961 Rangoon	3	16	24	39	79
1965 Kuala Lumpur	2	33	36	28	97
1967 Bangkok	3	23	29	43	95
1969 Rangoon	4	16	24	39	79
1971 Kuala Lumpur	2	41	43	55	139
1973 Singapore	3	30	35	50	115
1975 Bangkok	4	27	49	51	127
SEA Games
1977 Kuala Lumpur	5	21	17	21	59
1979 Jakarta	5	19	23	39	81
1981 Manila	4	16	27	31	74
1983 Singapore	6	16	25	40	81
1985 Bangkok	4	26	28	32	86
1987 Jakarta	4	35	41	67	143
1989 Kuala Lumpur	2	67	58	75	200
1991 Manila	4	36	38	65	139
1993 Singapore	5	43	45	65	153
1995 Chiang Mai	4	31	49	69	149
1997 Jakarta	3	55	68	75	198
1999 Bandar Seri Begawan	2	57	45	42	144
2001 Kuala Lumpur	1	111	98	86	295
2003 Hanoi / Ho Chi Minh City	5	43	42	59	144
2005 Manila	4	61	49	65	175
2007 Nakhon Ratchasima	2	68	52	96	216
2009 Vientiane	4	40	40	59	139
2011 Palembang / Jakarta	4	59	50	81	190
2013 Naypyidaw	5	43	38	77	158
2015 Singapore	4	62	58	66	186
2017 Kuala Lumpur	1	145	92	86	323
2019 Philippines	5	55	58	71	184
2021 Vietnam	6	39	45	89	173
2023 Cambodia	7	34	45	97	176
2025 Thailand	4	57	57	117	231
2027 Malaysia	Future event				
Total	3	1433	1420	1990	4843

== Medals by sport ==
Sport	Rank	1st place, gold medalist(s)	2nd place, silver medalist(s)	3rd place, bronze medalist(s)	Total
Archery	0	20	23	10	53
Athletics	0	67	45	66	178
Badminton	2	46	55	98	199
Basketball	2	15	7	14	36
Billiards and snooker	7	3	6	10	19
Bodybuilding	0	1	2	0	3
Bowling	0	24	14	22	60
Boxing	0	7	20	58	85
Canoeing	0	0	0	4	4
Chess	0	1	2	8	11
Cricket	0	3	5	5	13
Cycling	0	30	21	13	64
Diving	1	61	26	14	101
Equestrian	0	14	7	4	25
Fencing	0	2	5	19	26
Field hockey	0	27	3	0	30
Figure skating	0	3	0	1	4
Floorball	0	0	0	5	5
Football	2	6	7	8	21
Futsal	0	0	2	2	4
Handball	0	0	0	2	2
Golf	0	4	5	12	21
Gymnastics	0	59	43	25	127
Ice hockey	0	0	0	1	1
Indoor hockey	0	3	4	1	8
Judo	0	3	6	38	47
Karate	0	44	25	33	102
Lawn bowls	0	7	1	0	8
Muaythai	0	2	1	1	4
Netball	0	1	1	0	2
Pencak silat	0	32	12	40	84
Pétanque	0	3	5	17	25
Polo	0	2	0	0	2
Rowing	0	0	0	2	2
Rugby sevens	0	1	3	2	6
Sailing	0	18	18	16	52
Sepaktakraw	0	4	6	12	22
Short track speed skating	0	4	0	3	7
Shooting	0	14	32	28	69
Skateboarding	0	1	0	1	2
Softball	0	0	0	4	4
Sport climbing	0	0	1	2	3
Squash	0	13	8	3	24
Swimming	0	57	45	43	145
Synchronised swimming	0	8	5	0	13
Table tennis	0	17	32	76	125
Taekwondo	0	21	27	51	99
Tennis	5	2	5	31	38
Triathlon	0	2	2	1	5
Volleyball	6	0	1	1	2
Waterskiing	0	10	6	6	22
Water polo	0	0	0	1	1
Weightlifting	0	4	7	14	25
Wushu	0	25	23	30	78
Total	3	1, 433	1,420	1,990	4,843

== Medals by individual ==
Athlete	Sport	Years	Gender	Gold	Silver	Bronze	Total
Nurul Huda Abdullah	Swimming	1985–1989	F	22	4	1	27
Leong Mun Yee	Diving	1999–2017	F	17	5	5	27
Daniel Bego	Swimming	2003–2015	M	11	8	4	23
Rosalind Singha Ang	Badminton	1965–1975	F	10	9	0	19
Yeoh Ken Nee	Diving	2001–2011	M	10	1	0	11
Nashatar Singh Sidhu	Athletics	1965–1975	M	9	0	0	9
Sylvia Ng	Badminton	1969–1975	F	8	4	1	13
Mary Rajamani	Athletics	1965–1971	F	8	0	0	8
Mohamed Zaki Sadri	Athletics	1987–1997	M	8	0	0	8
Murusamy Ramachandran	Athletics	1993–1999	M	8	0	0	8
Ng Boon Bee	Badminton	1961–1971	M	7	2	1	10
Ooi Tze Liang	Diving	2011–2015	M	7	2	0	9
Katrina Ann Abdul Hadi	Synchronized swimming	2011–2015	F	6	2	0	8
Cheong Jun Hoong	Diving	2003–2015	F	6	1	2	9
Bryan Nickson Lomas	Diving	2005–2011	M	6	1	0	7
Nur Herman Majid	Athletics	1991–2001	M	6	0	0	6
Pandelela Rinong	Diving	2007–2015	F	6	0	0	6
Ramasamy Subramaniam	Athletics	1965–1971	M	6	0	0	6
Vellasamy Subramaniam	Athletics	1977–1985	M	6	0	0	6
Khoo Cai Lin	Swimming	2007–2015	F	5	7	5	17
Punch Gunalan	Badminton	1969–1973	M	5	3	1	9
Ng Shu Wai	Gymnastics	2003–2005	M	5	3	0	8
Lim Wen Chean	Gymnastics	2003–2007	F	5	2	0	7
Zulmazran Zulkifli	Bowling	2005–2011	M	5	1	5	11
Esther Cheah	Bowling	2005–2015	F	5	1	2	8
Gladys Chai Ng Mei	Athletics	1973–1979	F	5	0	0	5
Kamaruddin Maidin	Athletics	1959–1967	M	5	0	0	5
Loo Kum Zee	Athletics	1995–2003	M	5	0	0	5
Mani Jegathesan	Athletics	1961–1965	M	5	0	0	5
Png Hui Chuen	Synchronized swimming	2011	F	5	0	0	5
