= Malaysia at the 1967 SEAP Games =

Malaysia at the 1967 Southeast Asian Peninsular Games
- IOC code: MAS
- NOC: Olympic Council of Malaysia
- Website: www.olympic.org.my (in English)

in Bangkok
- Competitors: 247 in 16 sports
- Medals Ranked 3rd: Gold 23 Silver 29 Bronze 43 Total 95

Southeast Asian Peninsular Games appearances
- 1959; 1961; 1965; 1967; 1969; 1971; 1973; 1975; 1977; 1979; 1981; 1983; 1985; 1987; 1989; 1991; 1993; 1995; 1997; 1999; 2001; 2003; 2005; 2007; 2009; 2011; 2013; 2015; 2017; 2019; 2021; 2023; 2025; 2027; 2029

Malaysia competed in the 1967 Southeast Asian Peninsular Games held in Bangkok, Thailand from 9 to 16 December 1967. It won 23 gold, 29 silver and 43 bronze medals.

== Medal summary ==
=== Medals by sport ===
Sport	Gold	Silver	Bronze	Total	Rank
Athletics	18	9	7	34	1
Badminton	2	2	5	9	2
Basketball	0	1	0	1	2
Cycling	0	1	6	7	
Diving	0	1	3	4	
Sailing	0	0	3	3	
Sepak takraw	0	1	0	1	
Shooting	0	0	2	2	
Swimming	0	4	1	5	
Table tennis	0	3	4	7	
Tennis	0	1	3	4	
Water polo	0	1	0	1	
Weightlifting	1	1	2	4	
Total	23	29	43	95	3

=== Medallists ===
Medal	Name	Sport	Event
Gold	Gunaratnam Rajalingam	Athletics	Men's 100 metres
Gold	Gunaratnam Rajalingam	Athletics	Men's 200 metres
Gold	Victor Asirvatham	Athletics	Men's 400 metres
Gold	Ramasamy Subramaniam	Athletics	Men's 800 metres
Gold	Ramasamy Subramaniam	Athletics	Men's 1500 metres
Gold	Ramasamy Subramaniam	Athletics	Men's 5000 metres
Gold	Dilbagh Singh Kler	Athletics	Men's 3000 metres steeplechase
Gold	Andyappan Nathan	Athletics	Men's 400 metres hurdles
Gold	Zainal Salleh	Athletics	Men's high jump
Gold	Kamaruddin Maidin	Athletics	Men's long jump
Gold	Nashatar Singh Sidhu	Athletics	Men's shot put
Gold	Danapal Naidu	Athletics	Men's discus throw
Gold	Nashatar Singh Sidhu	Athletics	Men's javelin throw
Gold		Athletics	Men's 4 × 400 metres relay
Gold	Cheryl Dorall	Athletics	Women's 100 metres
Gold	Mary Rajamani	Athletics	Women's 400 metres
Gold	Mary Rajamani	Athletics	Women's 800 metres
Gold		Athletics	Women's 4 × 100 metres relay
Gold	Ng Boon Bee; Tan Yee Khan	Badminton	Men's doubles
Gold	Rosalind Singha Ang; Teoh Siew Yong	Badminton	Women's doubles
Gold	Yap Meng Soon	Weightlifting	Men's middle heavyweight
Silver	Zambrose Abdul Rahman	Athletics	Men's 400 metres hurdles
Silver	Shazar Amir	Athletics	Men's long jump
Silver	Kamaruddin Maidin	Athletics	Men's triple jump
Silver	M. Dattaya	Athletics	Men's discus throw
Silver	Ghenda Singh	Athletics	Men's hammer throw
Silver	Tien Teng Leng	Athletics	Men's javelin throw
Silver	J. V. Jayan	Athletics	Men's decathlon
Silver	Mary Rajamani	Athletics	Women's 200 metres
Silver	Chai Ng Mei	Athletics	Women's high jump
Silver	Rosalind Singha Ang	Badminton	Women's singles
Silver	Silvia Tan; Ho Cheng Yoke	Badminton	Women's doubles
Silver	Malaysia national basketball team	Basketball	Women's tournament
Silver		Cycling	Men's 100 kilometre team time trial
Silver	Victor Lam	Diving	Men's springboard
Silver		Sepak takraw	Men's tournament
Silver		Shooting	Men's rifle three positions team
Silver	Chan Chee Seng	Swimming	Men's 1500 metres freestyle
Silver	Leong Wei Tat	Swimming	Men's 200 metres backstroke
Silver	Ong Lay Sinn	Swimming	Men's 100 metres breaststroke
Silver	Yek Bee Yong	Swimming	Men's 200 metres breaststroke
Silver	Foong Sek Seong; Lee Mun Chew	Table tennis	Men's doubles
Silver	Lim Hee Peng; Chong Siok Fong	Table tennis	Mixed doubles
Silver		Table tennis	Women's team
Silver		Tennis	Women's team
Silver	Malaysia national water polo team	Water polo	Men's tournament
Silver	Harbans Singh	Weightlifting	Men's heavyweight
Bronze	Ishtiaq Mubarak	Athletics	Men's triple jump
Bronze	Nashatar Singh Sidhu	Athletics	Men's hammer throw
Bronze	Ooi Hock Kin; Gunaratnam Rajalingam; M. Ariffin; Zainuddin Wahab	Athletics	Men's 4 × 100 metres relay
Bronze	Lee Nyeuk Moi	Athletics	Women's 400 metres
Bronze	Vivien Ee	Athletics	Women's javelin throw
Bronze	P. Savithri	Athletics	Women's discus throw
Bronze	P. Savithri	Athletics	Women's pentathlon
Bronze	Yew Cheng Hoe	Badminton	Men's singles
Bronze	Billy Ng	Badminton	Men's singles
Bronze	Yew Cheng Hoe; Khor Cheng Chye	Badminton	Men's doubles
Bronze	Ng Boon Bee; Teh Siew Yong	Badminton	Mixed doubles
Bronze	Lee Guan Chong; Yap Hei Lin	Badminton	Mixed doubles
Bronze	Ng Joo Pong	Cycling	Men's 4000 metre individual pursuit
Bronze	A. Michael; Choy Mow Thim; Low Poh Teck; Ng Joo Ngan	Cycling	Men's 4000 metre team pursuit
Bronze	Low Poh Teck	Cycling	Men's 4800 metre massed start
Bronze	Ng Joo Pong	Cycling	Men's 10,000 metre massed start
Bronze	Choy Mow Thim	Cycling	Men's 1000 metre individual time trial
Bronze		Cycling	Men's 1000 metre team time trial
Bronze	Ong Hock Seng	Diving	Men's high diving
Bronze	C. B. Cheong	Diving	Men's high board
Bronze	A. V. King	Diving	Women's springboard
Bronze	Syed Mohamed; Sein Kyaing	Sailing	National Enterprise
Bronze	Chang Kuo Hwa; Syed Mohd Yahya	Sailing	Flying Dutchman
Bronze	Razali Lazim	Sailing	O. K. Dinghy
Bronze		Shooting	Men's free pistol
Bronze	Leong Wei Tat	Swimming	Men's 100 metre backstroke
Bronze	Lim Hee Peng	Table tennis	Men's singles
Bronze	Chong Siok Fong	Table tennis	Women's singles
Bronze	Chong Siok Fong; Fong Kwee Chin	Table tennis	Women's doubles
Bronze		Table tennis	Men's team
Bronze	Lian Lai Yee	Tennis	Women's singles
Bronze	Radhika Menon	Tennis	Women's singles
Bronze	S. A. Azman; Radhika Menon	Tennis	Mixed doubles
Bronze	Ng Chow Seng	Weightlifting	Men's lightweight
Bronze		Weightlifting	Men's flyweight
