= Athletics at the 1967 Summer Universiade – Men's 800 metres =

The men's 800 metres event at the 1967 Summer Universiade was held at the National Olympic Stadium in Tokyo on 2 and 3 September 1967.

== Medalists ==
Gold	Silver	Bronze
Ralph Doubell; Australia	Franz-Josef Kemper; West Germany	Bodo Tümmler; West Germany

== Results ==
=== Heats ===
Rank	Heat	Athlete	Nationality	Time	Notes
1	1	Michel Samper	France	1:57.3	Q
2	1	Ian Jones	Australia	1:57.3	Q
3	1	Dave Cropper	Great Britain	1:57.4	Q
4	1	Wade Bell	United States	1:57.9	Q
5	1	Gianni Del Buono	Italy	1:58.2	Q
6	1	Marcelo Langurayan	Philippines	2:00.2	
1	2	Juha Väätäinen	Finland	1:57.0	Q
2	2	Didier Gustin	France	1:57.0	Q
3	2	Franz-Josef Kemper	West Germany	1:57.1	Q
4	2	Mike Varah	Great Britain	1:57.2	Q
5	2	Yutaka Ikeda	Japan	1:57.2	Q
6	2	Tira Klai-Angtong	Thailand	1:57.5	q
1	3	Ralph Doubell	Australia	2:08.0	Q
2	3	Ray Haswell	Canada	2:08.3	Q
3	3	Yoshitate Tsuchiya	Japan	2:11.0	Q
4	3	Matti Tuura	Finland	2:21.6	Q
5	3	Bodo Tümmler	West Germany	2:39.9	Q

=== Semifinals ===
Rank	Heat	Athlete	Nationality	Time	Notes
1	1	Wade Bell	United States	1:50.4	Q
2	1	Gianni Del Buono	Italy	1:50.5	Q
3	1	Bodo Tümmler	West Germany	1:51.2	Q
4	1	Mike Varah	Great Britain	1:51.3	Q
5	1	Juha Väätäinen	Finland	1:51.8	
6	1	Didier Gustin	France	1:52.0	
7	1	Ian Jones	Australia	1:52.6	
8	1	Yutaka Ikeda	Japan	1:53.2	
1	2	Ralph Doubell	Australia	1:49.6	Q
2	2	Michel Samper	France	1:50.0	Q
3	2	Franz-Josef Kemper	West Germany	1:50.0	Q
4	2	Dave Cropper	Great Britain	1:50.5	Q
5	2	Yoshitake Tsuchiya	Japan	1:51.2	
6	2	Matti Tuura	Finland	1:52.2	
7	2	Ray Haswell	Canada	1:52.4	
8	2	Tira Klai-Angtong	Thailand	1:57.7	

=== Final ===
Rank	Name	Nationality	Time	Notes
1st place, gold medalist(s)	Ralph Doubell	Australia	1:46.7	UR
2nd place, silver medalist(s)	Franz-Josef Kemper	West Germany	1:46.7	
3rd place, bronze medalist(s)	Bodo Tümmler	West Germany	1:47.8	
4	Dave Cropper	Great Britain	1:48.5	
5	Michel Samper	France	1:48.5	
6	Wade Bell	United States	1:48.9	
7	Mike Varah	Great Britain	1:49.0	
8	Gianni Del Buono	Italy	1:49.2	
