= Muhammad Haiqal Hanafi =

Malaysian sprinter (born 1999)

Personal information
- Full name: Muhammad Haiqal bin Hanafi
- Born: 9 August 1999 (age 26) Senawang, Negeri Sembilan, Malaysia
- Education: Sekolah Sukan Tunku Mahkota Ismail
- Height: 169 cm (5 ft 7 in)

Sport
- Sport: Athletics
- Event: Sprinting

Achievements and titles
- Personal bests: 100 m: 10.35s (Manila 2019); 200 m: 21.18s (Kuala Lumpur 2022)
Medal record
Men's athletics
Representing Malaysia
Southeast Asian Games
Gold medal – first place	2019 Manila	100 m
Silver medal – second place	2019 Manila	4×100 m relay
Silver medal – second place	2021 Hanoi	4×100 m relay
Bronze medal – third place	2023 Cambodia	100m
Asian Junior Athletics Championships
Silver medal – second place	2016 Ho Chi Minh City	4x100 relay
ASEAN School Games
Gold medal – first place	2015 Bandar Seri Begawan	4×100 m relay

Muhammad Haiqal bin Hanafi (born 29 April 1999) is a Malaysian sprinter.

== Early life and education ==
Muhd Haiqal Hanafi was born on 29 April 1999 in Senawang, Negeri Sembilan. He attended the Sekolah Sukan Tunku Mahkota Ismail in Bandar Penawar.

== Career ==
2015 : ASEAN School Games Team Gold

Haiqal and his national teammates won gold medal at the 2015 ASEAN School Games in the 4x100 final with a time of 39.86 seconds.

2016 : Two golds in SEA Youth Athletics Championships

Haiqal gained his first international experience at the 2016 Asian Junior Championships in Ho Chi Minh City, where he reached the semi-finals in the 200 metres and won the silver medal with the Malaysian 4 x 100 metres relay team in 39.91 s behind the team from Taiwan. After that, he brought two gold medals for Malaysia team in 100m and 200m at the Southeast Asian Youth Athletics Championships.

2017 : Disqualified in both finals

he again took part in the Asian Junior Championships in Gifu, this time being eliminated in the first round of the 100 meters and finishing eighth in the 200 meters in 21.71s. He was also disqualified with the relay team in the final. At the end of August, he took part in the Asian Games in Jakarta with the relay team, where he competed in the heats and the relay team was disqualified in the final.

2019 : SEA Games individual Gold

Haiqal have surprised the nation after winning a gold medal in the 100m event at the 2019 Southeast Asian Games with a time 10.35s which is his personal best in 100m category. In the same competition, Haiqal teamed up with Khairul Hafiz Jantan, Russell Alexander Nasir Taib and Nixson Anak Kennedy to bagged a silver in 4x100 relay.

2022 : Return to the path

At the 2021 Southeast Asian Games in Hanoi, Vietnam he won a silver medal in the 4 × 100 m relay with his national teammates, including Muhd Azeem Fahmi, who holds the Malaysian record in the 100m outdoor event with a time of 10.09s to break the past national record in the 4x100 relay with time 39.09s.

Haiqal won the Malaysian Open 100m sprint with 10.58s but failed to meet the qualifying time of 10.52s for the 2023 Southeast Asian Games.

2023 : Bronze Medal in Hanoi

Haiqal made a comeback in 2023 Southeast Asian Games and finished first in 100m heat one. However, he only managed to finish third in the final competition and earned Malaysia a bronze medal.
