= Jaruwan Jenjudkarn =

Thai high jumper (born 1970)

Personal information
- Nationality: Thai
- Born: 4 July 1970 (age 56)

Sport
- Sport: Athletics
- Event: High jump
Medal record
Women's athletics
Representing Thailand
Asian Championships
Bronze medal – third place	1991 Kuala Lumpur	High jump
Bronze medal – third place	1995 Jakarta	High jump

Jaruwan Jenjudkarn (born 4 July 1970) is a Thai athlete. She competed in the women's high jump at the 1992 Summer Olympics.
