= Myitung Naw =

Burmese long-distance runner

Personal information
- Nationality: Burmese
- Born: 28 December 1933 Lahtaw Hkapra, Burma, British India
- Died: 18 November 2023 (aged 89)

Sport
- Sport: Long-distance running
- Events: Marathon, 10,000 metres
Medal record
Event	1st	2nd	3rd
Asian Games	0	1	1
SEA Games	1	3	0
Total	1	4	1
Men's athletics
Representing Burma
Asian Games
Silver medal – second place	1958 Tokyo	Marathon
Bronze medal – third place	1962 Jakarta	Marathon
SEA Games
Silver medal – second place	1961 Rangoon	10,000 m
Silver medal – second place	1965 Kuala Lumpur	10,000 m
Gold medal – first place	1967 Bangkok	Marathon
Silver medal – second place	1969 Rangoon	Marathon

Myitung Naw (28 December 1933—18 November 2023) was a Burmese long-distance runner. He competed in the marathon at the 1956 Summer Olympics and the 1960 Summer Olympics.

He was discovered while serving in the Kachin rifles.
