= Herman Suizo =

Filipino long-distance runner

Personal information
- Nationality: Filipino
- Born: January 19, 1959 (age 67)
- Height: 5 ft 3 in (160 cm)
- Weight: 112 lb (51 kg)

Sport
- Sport: Long-distance running
- Event: Marathon

Herman Suizo (born January 19, 1959) is a Filipino long-distance runner. He competed in the men's marathon at the 1992 Summer Olympics.
