= Soe Khin =

Burmese long-distance runner

Personal information
- Nationality: Burmese
- Born: 1 November 1950 (age 75)

Sport
- Sport: Long-distance running
- Event: Marathon

Soe Khin (born 1 November 1950) is a Burmese long-distance runner. He competed in the marathon at the 1980 Summer Olympics, in which he finished 47th.
