= Đỗ Quốc Luật =

Vietnamese long-distance runner (born 1993)

Personal information
- Nationality: Vietnamese
- Born: 12 February 1993 (age 33)

Sport
- Sport: steeplechase running
Medal record
Representing Vietnam
Southeast Asian Games
Gold medal – first place	2019 Manila	3000 m steeplechase
Silver medal – second place	2021 Hanoi	3000 m steeplechase

Đỗ Quốc Luật (born 12 February 1993) is a Vietnamese long-distance runner.
