= Jimmy Crampton =

Burmese middle-distance runner

Jimmy Crampton (born 23 July 1947) is a Burmese former middle distance runner who competed in the 1972 Summer Olympics.
