= Annastasia Raj =

Malaysian racewalker

Personal information
- Nationality: Malaysian
- Born: 26 July 1975 (age 50)

Sport
- Sport: Athletics
- Event: Racewalking

Annastasia Raj (born 26 July 1975), also known as Anastasia Karen Silvaraj, is a Malaysian racewalker. She competed in the women's 10 kilometres walk at the 1996 Summer Olympics.
