= Ma Kyin Lwan =

Burmese athlete

Personal information
- Nationality: Burmese
- Born: 5 May 1966 (age 60)

Sport
- Sport: Athletics
- Event: Racewalking
Medal record
Women's athletics
Representing Myanmar
Asian Championships
| Bronze medal – third place | 1989 New Delhi | 10 km walk |
| Bronze medal – third place | 1991 Kuala Lumpur | 10 km walk |

Ma Kyin Lwan (born 5 May 1966) is a Burmese racewalker. She competed in the women's 10 kilometres walk at the 1992 Summer Olympics.
