= Ratjai Sripet =

Thai sprinter

Personal information
- Nationality: Thai
- Born: 23 December 1960 (age 65)

Sport
- Sport: Sprinting
- Event: 100 metres
Medal record
Women's athletics
Representing Thailand
Asian Championships
Gold medal – first place	1983 Kuwait City	4×400 m
Gold medal – first place	1985 Jakarta	4×100 m
Silver medal – second place	1985 Jakarta	100 m
Silver medal – second place	1991 Kuala Lumpur	4×100 m
Bronze medal – third place	1989 New Delhi	4×100 m

Ratjai Sripet (born 23 December 1960) is a Thai sprinter. She competed in the women's 100 metres at the 1992 Summer Olympics.
