= Mar Mar Min =

Burmese long-distance runner

Personal information
- Nationality: Burmese
- Born: 18 July 1958 (age 67)

Sport
- Sport: Long-distance running
- Event: Marathon

Mar Mar Min (born 18 July 1958) is a Burmese long-distance runner. She competed in the women's marathon at the 1988 Summer Olympics. She was the first woman to represent Myanmar at the Olympics.
