= Pranee Kitipongpitaya =

Thai discus thrower

Personal information
- Nationality: Thai
- Born: 9 August 1942 (age 83)

Sport
- Sport: Athletics
- Event: Discus throw

Pranee Kitipongpitaya (born 9 August 1942) is a Thai athlete. She competed in the women's discus throw at the 1964 Summer Olympics.
