= Katesepsawasdi Bhakdikul =

Thai army officer

Personal information
- Nationality: Thai
- Born: 17 October 1941 (age 84)

Sport
- Sport: Athletics
- Event: High jump

Katesepsawasdi Bhakdikul (Thai: เกตุเสพสวัสดิ์ ภักดีกุล, born 17 October 1941) is a retired Thai army officer and athlete. He competed in the men's high jump at the 1964 Summer Olympics. He holds the rank of major general.
