= Dave Cropper =

British middle-distance runner

Personal information
- Nationality: British (English)
- Born: 26 December 1945 Birmingham, England
- Died: 3 December 2016 (aged 70) Solihull, England
- Height: 185 cm (6 ft 1 in)
- Weight: 73 kg (161 lb)

Sport
- Sport: Athletics
- Event: Middle-distance running
- Club: Berry Hill AC; Birchfield Harriers

David Cropper (26 December 1945 – 3 December 2016) was a British middle-distance runner. He competed at the 1968 Summer Olympics and the 1972 Summer Olympics.

== Biographyt ==
He was born in Birmingham and attended the Queen Elizabeth Grammar School in Mansfield. He grew up in Mansfield Woodhouse.

At the 1968 Olympic Games in Mexico City, he represented Great Britain in the 800 metres event.

Cropper became the British 800 metres champion after winning the British AAA Championships title at the 1969 AAA Championships Cropper participated in the 1969 European Athletics Championships in Athens.

Cropper was runner-up in the same event at both the 1971 AAA Championships and 1972 AAA Championships.

He married fellow athlete Pat Cropper in December 1971, they had one child and lived in Solihull. His wife's family lived on Clumber Road, in North Evington in Leicester.

Cropper represented Great Britain again at the Olympic Games when competing in the 800 metres at the 1972 Olympics Games in Munich. After retiring as an athlete he became a well-known administrator and was chairman of the AAA from 1991 to 2004. He was awarded an OBE in 2005.
