= Athletics at the SEA Games =

Athletics is one of the regular sports at the biennial SEA Games (SEA Games) competition, which has been competed at the Games since the inaugural edition of the South East Asian Peninsular Games (SEAP) in 1959.

Athletics is the competition with the most medal events, with 48 of total 530 gold medal in 2019 edition.

== Editions ==
Games	Year	Host city	Host country	Total Events	Best Country	2nd Best Country	3rd Best Country	Results
SEAP Games
I	1959	Bangkok	Thailand	{{}}				
II	1961	Rangoon	Burma	{{}}				
-	1963	(Cancelled)	Cambodia	{{}}				
III	1965	Kuala Lumpur	Malaysia	{{}}				
IV	1967	Bangkok	Thailand	{{}}				
V	1969	Rangoon	Burma	{{}}				
VI	1971	Kuala Lumpur	Malaysia	{{}}				
VII	1973	Singapore	Singapore	{{}}				
VIII	1975	Bangkok	Thailand	{{}}				
SEA Games
IX	1977	Kuala Lumpur	Malaysia	Burma				
X	1979	Jakarta	Indonesia	{{}}				
XI	1981	Manila	Philippines	Burma				
XII	1983	Singapore	Singapore	Philippines				
XIII	1985	Bangkok	Thailand	41	Thailand (10-12-10)	Philippines (10-4-5)	Indonesia (9-12-12)	
XIV	1987	Jakarta	Indonesia	45	Indonesia (17-13-19)	Thailand (8-9-4)	Malaysia (8-4-7)	
XV	1989	Kuala Lumpur	Malaysia	{{}}				
XVI	1991	Manila	Philippines	44	Thailand (12-8-9)	Malaysia (11-7-9)	Philippines (8-8-8)	
XVII	1993	Singapore	Singapore	44	Malaysia (14-6-7)	Indonesia (13-11-7)	Thailand (8-11-7)	
XVIII	1995	Chiang Mai	Thailand	45	Thailand (21-11-11)	Malaysia (8-10-4)	Indonesia (7-8-10)	
XIX	1997	Jakarta	Indonesia	44	Malaysia (16-7-5)	Thailand (15-19-7)	Indonesia (8-8-13)	
XX	1999	Bandar Seri Begawan	Brunei	41	Thailand (20-10-11)	Malaysia (12-6-6)	Indonesia (5-11-3)	
XXI	2001	Kuala Lumpur	Malaysia	46	Thailand (22-8-11)	Philippines (8-11-4)	Malaysia (8-5-9)	
XXII	2003	Hanoi & Ho Chi Minh City	Vietnam	45	Thailand (13-14-13)	Vietnam (8-15-8)	Philippines (8-3-5)	
XXIII	2005	Manila, Laguna, Cebu, Bacolod	Philippines	45	Thailand (12-13-19)	Philippines (9-11-9)	Vietnam (8-8-4)	
XXIV	2007	Nakhon Ratchasima	Thailand	45	Thailand (17-19-9)	Vietnam (8-4-5)	Indonesia (7-7-5)	
XXV	2009	Vientiane	Laos	45	Thailand (14-20-14)	Indonesia (7-7-7)	Vietnam (7-4-11)	
XXVI	2011	Palembang & Jakarta	Indonesia	46	Thailand (14-9-9)	Indonesia (13-12-11)	Vietnam (9-9-14)	
XXVII	2013	Naypyidaw	Myanmar	46	Thailand (17-13-10)	Vietnam (11-10-12)	Indonesia (6-4-7)	
XXVIII	2015	Singapore	Singapore	46	Thailand (17-13-9)	Vietnam (11-15-8)	Indonesia (7-4-4)	
XXIX	2017	Kuala Lumpur	Malaysia	45	Vietnam (17-11-6)	Thailand (9-13-11)	Malaysia (8-8-9)	
XXX	2019	Philippines	Philippines	49	Vietnam (16-12-10)	Thailand (12-11-12)	Philippines (11-8-8)	
XXXI	2021	Hanoi	Vietnam	47	Vietnam (22-14-8)	Thailand (12-11-8)	Philippines (5-7-14)	
XXXII	2023	Phnom Penh	Cambodia	47	Thailand (14-8-5)	Vietnam (12-20-8)	Indonesia (7-3-9)	
XXXIII	2025	Bangkok	Thailand	47	Thailand (13-13-4)	Vietnam (12-12-11)	Indonesia (9-5-6)	

== Medals (1959-2023) ==
Rank	NOC	Gold	Silver	Bronze	Total
1	Thailand (THA)	375	302	275	952
2	Malaysia (MAS)	285	235	251	771
3	Myanmar (MYA)	176	186	139	501
4	Indonesia (INA)	155	178	189	522
5	Philippines (PHI)	141	154	161	456
6	Vietnam (VIE)	133	138	126	397
7	Singapore (SIN)	69	112	129	310
8	Cambodia (CAM)	12	9	15	36
9	Brunei (BRU)	0	2	6	8
10	Timor-Leste (TLS)	0	2	0	2
11	Laos (LAO)	0	0	8	8
Totals (11 entries)		1,346	1,318	1,299	3,963

== See also ==
- List of SEA Games records in athletics
- List of SEA Games medalists in athletics
- Southeast Asian Youth Athletics Championships
- Southeast Asian Athletics Association
- Southeast Asian Games Federation
