= Tira Klai-Angtong =

Thai middle-distance runner

Personal information
- Nationality: Thai
- Born: 27 June 1943 (age 83)

Sport
- Sport: Middle-distance running
- Event: 1500 metres

Tira Klai-Angtong (born 27 June 1943) is a Thai middle-distance runner. He competed in the men's 1500 metres at the 1964 Summer Olympics.
