= Thin Sumbwegam =

Burmese long-distance runner (born 1930)

Personal information
- Nationality: Burmese
- Born: 12 March 1930 Myitkyina, Burma, British India

Sport
- Sport: Long-distance running
- Event: Marathon

Thin Sumbwegam (born 12 March 1930) is a Burmese long-distance runner. He competed in the marathon at the 1964 Summer Olympics and the 1968 Summer Olympics.
