= Dilbagh Singh Kler =

Malaysian middle-distance runner

Personal information
- Nationality: Malaysian
- Born: 14 April 1936
- Died: 18 October 2012 (aged 76)

Sport
- Sport: Middle-distance running
- Event: Steeplechase

Dilbagh Singh Kler (14 April 1936 – 18 October 2012) was a Malaysian middle-distance runner. He competed in the men's 3000 metres steeplechase at the 1964 Summer Olympics.
