= Nur Herman Majid =

Malaysian hurdler

Personal information
- Born: August 2, 1969 (age 56)
- Height: 1.76 m (5 ft 9 in)
- Weight: 54 kg (119 lb)

Sport
- Sport: Track and field
- Events: 110 m hurdles, 60 m hurdles
Medal record
Men's athletics
Representing Malaysia
Asian Championships
Gold medal – first place	1991 Kuala Lumpur	110 m hurdles
Bronze medal – third place	1995 Jakarta	110 m hurdles
Southeast Asian Games
Gold medal – first place	1991 Manila	110 m hurdles
Gold medal – first place	1993 Singapore	110 m hurdles
Gold medal – first place	1995 Chiang Mai	110 m hurdles
Gold medal – first place	1997 Jakarta	110 m hurdles
Gold medal – first place	1999 Bandar Seri Begawan	110 m hurdles
Gold medal – first place	2001 Kuala Lumpur	110 m hurdles

Nur Herman Majid (born 2 August 1969) is a retired Malaysian who specialised in the sprint hurdles. He represented his country at the 1992 Summer Olympics as well as two indoor and one outdoor World Championships. In addition he won multiple medals on regional level.

His personal bests are 13.73 seconds in the 110 metres hurdles (+1.6 m/s, Hiroshima 1994) and 8.03 seconds in the 60 metres hurdles (Barcelona 1995). His 110 metres hurdles national record was broken in 2017 by Rayzam Shah Wan Sofian.

== Competition record ==
Year	Competition	Venue	Position	Event	Notes
Representing Malaysia
1991	World Indoor Championships	Seville, Spain	24th (h)	60 m hurdles	8.33
1991	Asian Championships	Kuala Lumpur, Malaysia	1st	110 m hurdles	14.04
1991	Southeast Asian Games	Manila, Philippines	1st	110 m hurdles	14.15
1992	Olympic Games	Barcelona, Spain	34th (h)	110 m hurdles	14.34
1993	Southeast Asian Games	Singapore	1st	110 m hurdles	
1994	Commonwealth Games	Victoria, Canada	–	110 m hurdles	DNF
1994	Asian Games	Hiroshima, Japan	3rd	110 m hurdles	13.73
1995	World Indoor Championships	Barcelona, Spain	34th (h)	60 m hurdles	8.03
1995	Asian Championships	Jakarta, Indonesia	3rd	110 m hurdles	13.99
1995	World Championships	Gothenburg, Sweden	44th (h)	110 m hurdles	14.19
1995	Southeast Asian Games	Chiang Mai, Thailand	1st	110 m hurdles	
1997	Southeast Asian Games	Jakarta, Indonesia	1st	110 m hurdles	14.09s(GR)
1998	Commonwealth Games	Kuala Lumpur, Malaysia	11th (h)	110 m hurdles	14.13
1999	Southeast Asian Games	Bandar Seri Begawan, Brunei	1st	110 m hurdles	
2001	Southeast Asian Games	Kuala Lumpur, Malaysia	1st	110 m hurdles	14.02

== Honours ==
=== Honour of Malaysia ===
- Malaysia :
  - Member of the Order of the Defender of the Realm (A.M.N.) (1992)
