= Gladys Chai von der Laage =

German sports photographer (born 1953)

Medal record

Women's athletics

Representing Malaysia

Asian Championships
Silver medal – second place	1973 Marikina	High jump

Gladys Chai von der Laage (born Chai Ng Mei on 22 February 1953) is a German sports photographer of Malaysian Chinese origin. She has previously competed at the 1972 Summer Olympics as a Malaysian pentathlete.

== Early life ==
Chai Ng Mei was born on 22 February 1953 to Chinese parents.

== Career ==
When she was 14 years old, Chai won a silver in the high jump event of the 1967 Southeast Asian Games. She trained in West Germany in 1971. The following year, she represented Malaysia in the women's pentathlon event of 1972 Summer Olympics but was forced to retire because of an injury. Chai won four golds at the 1973 and 1975 SEA games; 2 each in high jump and pentathlon. She finished in the ninth place at the 1974 British Commonwealth Games's women's high jump event and bagged another gold medal in the high jump event of 1979 Southeast Asian Games.

Later she became a sports photographer and was awarded the German Athletics Association's Media Prize in 2016 after more than twenty years of her work in this profession. The website Sports Reference cites her as "one of the world's best-known sports photographers".

== Personal life ==
Chai married a West German sports journalist Rolf von der Laage. Together the couple established their own agency ASVOM. Laage died in 2006.
