= Mary Rajamani =

Malaysian sprinter

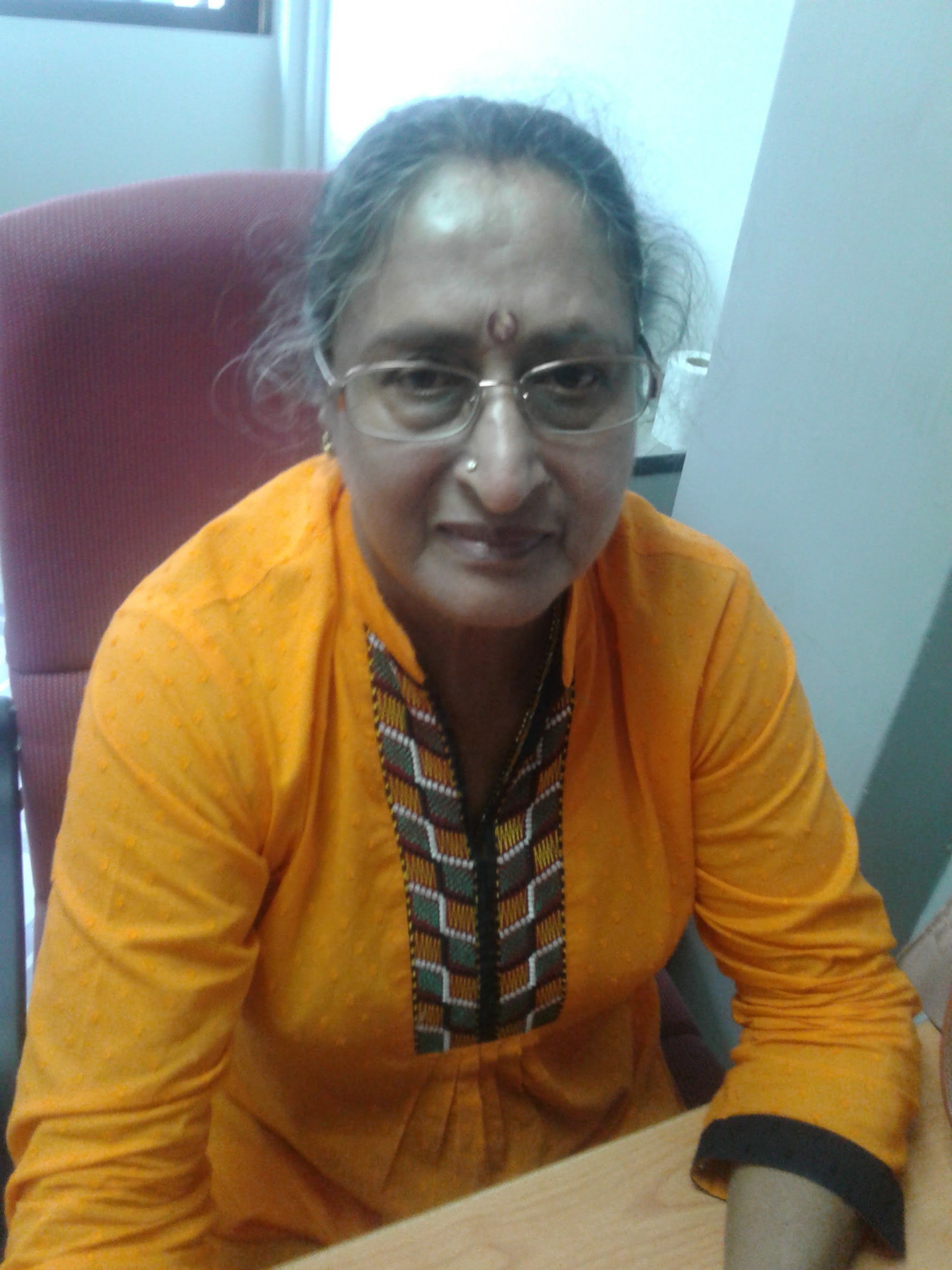
- Mary Rajamani in 2016

Personal information
- Nationality: Malaysian
- Born: 11 November 1943 (age 82)

Sport
- Sport: Sprinting
- Event: 400 metres
Medal record
Men's athletics
Representing Malaysia
South East Asian Peninsular Games
Gold medal – first place	1965 Kuala Lumpur	200 m
Gold medal – first place	1965 Kuala Lumpur	400 m
Gold medal – first place	1965 Kuala Lumpur	800 m

Mary Mailvaganam Rajamani (born 11 November 1943) is a Malaysian sprinter. She competed in the women's 400 metres at the 1964 Summer Olympics.

In 1968, she was awarded with the Member of the Order of the Defender of the Realm (A.M.N.) in Malaysia.
