= Mani Jegathesan =

Malaysian sprinter

Jegathesan Manikavasagam (born 2 November 1943), is often referred to as the Flying Doctor of Malaysia for his athletic achievements in Asia, despite being firstly a medical student then a doctor. He was an icon in the 1960s, regarded as the "Golden Era" of Malaysian athletics. In his heyday, he was regarded as the fastest man in Asia. He served the government health service for 32 years including the posts of Director of the Institute for Medical Research and Deputy Director-General of the Ministry of Health, Malaysia

Jegathesan is a Medical Researcher; and was appointed Chairman of the Commonwealth Games Federation (CGF) Medical Commission and honorary Medical Advisor for the 2006 Melbourne Commonwealth Games. He served as Chairman of the Medical Council, and the Anti-Doping Commission of the Olympic council of Asia. He also served as the Deputy President of the Olympic Council of Malaysia (OCM).

His brother is 1956 800 m Olympian M. Hari Chandra.

== Sports Involvement ==
=== Asian Games ===
In 1966, he earned the accolade of being the fastest man in Asia by winning three gold medals at the Bangkok Asian Games in the 100 m, 200 m and 4 × 100 m Men's Relay events.

=== Commonwealth Games ===
At the Kingston Commonwealth Games in 1966, Dr Jega became the first Malaysian to qualify for the final of the 220-yard (now the 200 m) race.

Dr Jegathesan was not only an accomplished athlete, doctor and researcher, but held important responsibilities as Chairman of the Commonwealth Games Federation (CGF) Medical Commission and honorary Medical Advisor for the 2006 Melbourne Commonwealth Games.

In an interview with the New Straits Times, Dr Jega said it was a great honour, to serve his country.

"But in whatever capacity, being part of the Commonwealth Games in itself keeps the adrenaline pumping as it brings back fond memories," he said.

=== Olympic Games ===
Dr Jega has competed in three consecutive Olympic Games, namely Rome (1960), Tokyo (1964) and Mexico (1968).

He qualified for two 200m semi-finals and the national record he set in 1968 (20.92s) stood for 49 years until it was broken in 2017.

== Honours ==
=== Honours of Malaysia ===
- Malaysia
  - Commander of the Order of Loyalty to the Crown of Malaysia (PSM) – Tan Sri (2010)
  - Commander of the Order of Meritorious Service (PJN) – Datuk (1998)
  - Companion of the Order of Loyalty to the Crown of Malaysia (JSM) (1991)
  - Officer of the Order of the Defender of the Realm (KMN) (1979)
  - Member of the Order of the Defender of the Realm (AMN) (1966)
- Perak
  - Knight Commander of the Order of the Perak State Crown (DPMP) – Dato' (1992)
