= Kaimar-ud-Din bin Maidin =

Malaysian long jumper (1942–2009)

Personal information
- Nationality: Malaysian
- Born: 3 July 1942 Kuala Terengganu, Malaysia
- Died: 19 April 2009 (aged 66) Kuala Terengganu, Malaysia

Sport
- Sport: Athletics
- Event: Long jump

Kaimar-ud-Din bin Maidin (3 July 1942 – 19 April 2009) was a Malaysian athlete. He competed in the men's long jump at the 1960 Summer Olympics.
