= Ramasamy Subramaniam =

Malaysian middle-distance runner (1939–2022)

Personal information
- Nationality: Malaysian
- Born: 24 October 1939 British Malaya
- Died: 27 February 2022 (aged 82) Kajang, Malaysia

Sport
- Sport: Middle-distance running
- Event: 800 metres

Ramasamy Subramaniam (24 October 1939 – 27 February 2022) was a Malaysian middle-distance runner. He competed in the 800 metres at the 1964 Summer Olympics and the 1968 Summer Olympics. In 1976, he was awarded the Officer of the Order of the Defender of the Realm (K.M.N.) in Malaysia.

Subramaniam died after being hospitalized due to chest pain, at Kajang Hospital, on 27 February 2022, at the age of 82.
