= Nashatar Singh Sidhu =

Malaysian javelin thrower (born 1939)

Medal record

Men's athletics

Representing Malaysia

Asian Games
Gold medal – first place	1966 Bangkok	Javelin throw
Bronze medal – third place	1970 Bangkok	Javelin throw

Asian Championships
Silver medal – second place	1973 Marikina	Javelin throw

Nashatar Singh Sidhu (Punjabi: ਨਾਸਤਰ ਸਿੰਘ ਸਿੱਧੂ, romanized: Nāsatara sigha sidhū; born 19 August 1939) is a Malaysian former javelin thrower who competed in the 1964 Summer Olympics and in the 1968 Summer Olympics.

== Honour ==
=== Honour of Malaysia ===
- Malaysia
  - Member of the Order of the Defender of the Realm (A.M.N.) (1972)
