= Anugerah Sukan Negara =

Annual sporting award ceremony in Malaysia

- Country: Malaysia
- Presented by: National Sports Council of Malaysia
- First award: 22 July 1967

Anugerah Sukan Negara (lit. 'National Sports Awards') is an annual award ceremony in Malaysia, organised by the National Sports Council of Malaysia since 1966. The awards represent the nation's full recognition of remarkable Malaysian individuals from the world of sports, along with the greatest sporting achievements throughout the year.

== Awards timeline ==
=== Ceremony ===
#	Year	Date	Venue	Ref
1st	1966	22 July 1967	Rothmans Pavilion, Maha Showgrounds, Old Klang Road	
2nd	1967	30 April 1968	Rothmans Pavilion, Maha Showgrounds, Old Klang Road	
3rd	1968	28 June 1969	Merlin Hotel, KL	
4th	1969	8 July 1970	Merlin Hotel, KL	
5th	1970	21 August 1971	Royal Lake Club, KL	
6th	1971	11 December 1972	Royal Lake Club, KL	
7th	1972	18 July 1973	Hilton Hotel, KL	
8th	1973	6 April 1974	Hilton Hotel, KL	
9th	1974	29 March 1975	Royal Lake Club, KL	
10th	1975	11 April 1976	Royal Lake Club, KL	
11th	1976	2 April 1977	Royal Lake Club, KL	
12th	1977	4 June 1978	Royal Lake Club, KL	
13th	1978	2 June 1979	Stadium Negara, KL	
14th	1979	12 July 1980	Stadium Negara, KL	
15th	1980	30 May 1981	Stadium Negara, KL	
16th	1981	3 April 1982	Stadium Negara, KL	
17th	1982	2 April 1983	Old City Hall of Kuala Lumpur, KL	
18th	1983	14 April 1984	Hilton Hotel, KL	
19th	1984	30 April 1985	Grand Ballroom, Shangri-La Hotel, KL	
20th	1985	29 March 1986		
21st	1986	17 January 1987	Stadium Negara, KL	
22nd	1987	12 March 1988	Stadium Negara, KL	
23rd	1988	10 June 1989	Stadium Negara, KL	
24th	1989	1990		
25th	1990	16 June 1991	Shangri-la Hotel, Kuala Lumpur	
26th	1991	25 April 1992	Holiday Villa, KL	
27th	1992	10 April 1993		
28th	1993	2 April 1994		
29th	1994	15 April 1995		
30th	1995	13 May 1996	Hilton Hotel, KL	
31st	1996	31 March 1997	Sheraton Subang Hotel and Towers, Subang Jaya	
32nd	1997	11 April 1998	Sheraton Subang Hotel and Towers, Subang Jaya	
33rd	1998	6 April 1999	Sheraton Subang Hotel and Towers, Subang Jaya	
34th	1999	3 April 2000	Sheraton Subang Hotel and Towers, Subang Jaya	
35th	2000	10 April 2001	Sheraton Subang Hotel and Towers, Subang Jaya	
36th	2001	9 April 2002	Sheraton Subang Hotel and Towers, Subang Jaya	
37th	2002	25 March 2003	Sheraton Subang Hotel and Towers, Subang Jaya	
38th	2003	30 March 2004	Sheraton Subang Hotel and Towers, Subang Jaya	
39th	2004	22 March 2005	Sheraton Subang Hotel and Towers, Subang Jaya	
40th	2005	4 April 2006	Sheraton Subang Hotel and Towers, Subang Jaya	
41st	2006	10 April 2007	Juara Stadium, Mont Kiara	
42nd	2007	13 May 2008	Palace of the Golden Horses, Seri Kembangan	
43rd	2008	23 March 2009	Grand Ballroom Mandarin Oriental, KLCC	
44th	2009	27 April 2010	Grand Ballroom Mandarin Oriental, KLCC	
45th	2010	15 March 2011	Grand Ballroom Mandarin Oriental, KLCC	
46th	2011	17 April 2012	Palace of the Golden Horses, Seri Kembangan	
47th	2012	16 April 2013	Grand Dorsett Subang, Subang Jaya	
48th	2013	19 May 2014	Juara Stadium, Mont Kiara	
49th	2014	28 April 2015	Grand Dorsett Subang, Subang Jaya	
50th	2015	25 May 2016	Putrajaya International Convention Centre, Putrajaya	
51st	2016	26 April 2017	Shangri-La Hotel, KL	
52nd	2017	13 March 2018	Hilton Hotel, KL	
53rd	2018	23 April 2019	Shangri-La Hotel, KL	
54th	2019/20	22 March 2021	Majestic Hotel, KL	
55th	2021	31 January 2023	Banquet Hall, Casa 4, National Sports Council of Malaysia, KL	
56th	2022	17 July 2023	Dorsett Grand Subang Hotel, Subang Jaya	
57th	2023	14 June 2024	National Sports Council, Bukit Jalil	
58th	2024	13 May 2025	Dorsett Grand Subang Hotel, Subang Jaya	

== Winners by category ==
=== National sportsman and sportswoman of the year ===
Year	Sportsman		Sportswoman	
Year	Name	Sport	Name	Sport
1966	Mani Jegathesan	Athletics	Mary Rajamani	Athletics
1967	Tan Aik Huang	Badminton	Mary Rajamani	Athletics
1968	Ng Boon Bee	Badminton	Annie Goh Koon Gee	Basketball
1969	Punch Gunalan	Badminton	Ong Mei Lin	Swimming
1970	Ng Joo Ngan	Cycling	Radhika Menon	Tennis
1971	Daud Ibrahim	Cycling	Junaidah Aman	Athletics
1972	Murugesan Mahendran	Field Hockey	Junaidah Aman	Athletics
1973	Chiang Jin Choon	Swimming	Gladys Chai Ng Mei	Athletics
1974	Punch Gunalan	Badminton	Rani Kaur	Field Hockey
1975	Khoo Chong Beng	Athletics	Sylvia Ng Meow Eng	Badminton
1976	Mokhtar Dahari	Football	Marina Chin Leng Sim	Athletics
1977	Shukor Salleh	Football	Marina Chin Leng Sim	Athletics
1978	V. Subramaniam	Athletics	Sylvia Ng Meow Eng	Badminton
1979	Khoo Boo Jin	Bowling	Shirley Chow Chew Chun	Bowling
1980	Rabuan Pit	Athletics	Katerina Ong Su Mei	Swimming
1981	Misbun Sidek	Badminton	Helen Chow	Swimming
1982	Rabuan Pit	Athletics	Zaiton Othman	Athletics
1983	Misbun Sidek	Badminton	Norsham Yoon	Athletics
1984	Michael Chuah Seng Tatt	Bowling	none awarded	none awarded
1985	Rosman Alwi	Cycling	Nurul Huda Abdullah	Swimming
1986	Abdul Malek Mohd Noor	Bodybuilding	Nurul Huda Abdullah	Swimming
1987	Murugayan Kumaresan	Cycling	Nurul Huda Abdullah	Swimming
1988	Jeffrey Ong	Swimming	Nurul Huda Abdullah	Swimming
1989	Foo Kok Keong	Badminton	Nurul Huda Abdullah	Swimming
1990	Rashid Sidek	Badminton	Lydia Kwah Poh Ling	Bowling
1991	Rashid Sidek	Badminton	Lisa Kwan	Bowling
1992	Rashid Sidek	Badminton	Lim Ai Lian	Golf
1993	Ramachandran Munusamy	Athletics	Lisa Kwan	Bowling
1994	Nur Herman Majid	Athletics	Shalin Zulkifli	Bowling
1995	Sam Chong Tin	Billiards and Snooker	Sharon Low Su Lin	Bowling
1996	Rashid Sidek	Badminton	Shalin Zulkifli	Bowling
1997	Cheah Soon Kit and Yap Kim Hock	Badminton	Shalin Zulkifli	Bowling
1998	Alex Lim Keng Liat	Swimming	Shanti Govindasamy	Athletics
1999	Shahrulneeza Razali	Cycling	Nicol David	Squash
2000	Sazali Samad	Bodybuilding	Noraseela Mohd Khalid	Athletics
2001	Roslin Hashim	Badminton	Shalin Zulkifli	Bowling
2002	Karamjit Singh and Allen Oh	Rallying	Shalin Zulkifli	Bowling
2003	Nazmizan Mohamad	Athletics	Nicol David	Squash
2004	Josiah Ng Onn Lam	Cycling	Elaine Teo	Taekwondo
2005	Lee Chong Wei	Badminton	Nicol David	Squash
2006	Sazali Samad	Bodybuilding	Nicol David	Squash
2007	Koo Kien Keat and Tan Boon Heong	Badminton	Nicol David	Squash
2008	Lee Chong Wei	Badminton	Nicol David	Squash
2009	Azizulhasni Awang	Cycling	Nicol David	Squash
2010	Azizulhasni Awang	Cycling	Nicol David	Squash
2011	Lee Chong Wei	Badminton	Pandelela Rinong	Diving
2012	Lee Chong Wei	Badminton	Pandelela Rinong	Diving
2013	Sazali Samad	Bodybuilding	Nicol David	Squash
2014	Sazali Samad	Bodybuilding	Nicol David	Squash
2015	Mohd Al-Jufferi Jamari	Pencak Silat	Pandelela Rinong	Diving
2016	Abdul Latif Romly	Para Athletics	Siti Rahmah Mohamed Nasir	Pencak Silat
2017	Azizulhasni Awang	Cycling	Cheong Jun Hoong	Diving
2018	Muhammad Rafiq Ismail	Bowling	Amy Kwan	Rhythmic Gymnastics
2019 / 2020	Azizulhasni Awang	Cycling	Tan Cheong Min	Wushu
2021	Azizulhasni Awang	Cycling	Pandelela Rinong	Diving
2022	Aaron Chia and Soh Wooi Yik	Badminton	Ng Joe Ee	Rhythmic Gymnastics
2023	Mike Mahen	Bodybuilding	Natasha Mohamed Roslan	Bowling
2024	Aaron Chia and Soh Wooi Yik	Badminton	Nor Farah Ain Abdullah	Lawn Bowling
2025	Chen Tang Jie	Badminton	Toh Ee Wei	Badminton

=== National Men's and Women's Team of the Year ===
Before 1997, this award category known as the Best Men's and Women's Team of the Year.

Year	National Men's Team of the Year		National Women's Team of the Year	
Year	Name	Sport	Name	Sport
1979	Malaysia men's national junior field hockey team	Field Hockey	Malaysia women's national basketball team	Basketball
1979	Malaysia men's national bowling team Khoo Boo Jin, Allan Hooi, Edward Lim	Bowling	Marina Chin Leng Sim, V. Angamah, Zaiton Othman, Saik Oik Cum	Athletics
1980	Razif Sidek and Jalani Sidek	Badminton	V. Angamah, Saik Oik Cum, Zaiton Othman, Fatimah Abu Samah	Athletics
1981	Malaysia men's national sepak takraw team	Sepak Takraw	Malaysia women's national basketball team	Basketball
1981	Ishak Amin, Yusof Udin, Othman Rashid, Shamsuddin Abdullah	Cycling	Zaiton Othman, Mumtaz Begum Jaafar, Saik Oik Cum, V. Angamah	Athletics
1982	none awarded	none awarded	none awarded	none awarded
1982	Razif Sidek and Jalani Sidek	Badminton	none awarded	none awarded
1983	none awarded	none awarded	none awarded	none awarded
1983	none awarded	none awarded	none awarded	none awarded
1984	none awarded	none awarded	none awarded	none awarded
1984	Sufian Tan, P. Segaran, Saad Yusof, N. Ravichandran	Golf	none awarded	none awarded
1985	Malaysia men's national basketball team	Basketball	Malaysia women's national basketball team	Basketball
1985	Razif Sidek and Jalani Sidek	Badminton	none awarded	none awarded
1986	Malaysia national badminton team Chong Weng Kai, Cheah Soon Kit, Jalani Sidek, Ong Beng Teong, Rashid Sidek, Punch Gunalan, Misbun Sidek, Foo Kok Keong, Razif Sidek	Badminton	none awarded	none awarded
1986	Razif Sidek and Jalani Sidek	Badminton	none awarded	none awarded
1987	Razif Sidek and Jalani Sidek	Badminton	Consolation prize: Josephine Mary Singarayar, Sajaratul Hamzah, Ratna Devi, Onn Yee Chan	Athletics
1988	Malaysia national badminton team Misbun Sidek, Razif Sidek, Jalani Sidek, Rashid Sidek, Foo Kok Keong, Cheah Soon Kit, Ong Beng Teong, Soo Beng Kiang, Lee Fook Heng	Badminton	none awarded	none awarded
1990				
1991	Razif Sidek and Jalani Sidek	Badminton		
1992				
1993				
1994				
1995			Malaysia women's national squash team Carrie Yeo, Kuan Choy Lin, Leong Siu Lynn, Sharon Wee Ee Lin	Squash
1996	Cheah Soon Kit and Yap Kim Hock	Badminton	Sarah Yap, Shalin Zulkifli, Low Poh Lian, Lydia Kwah, Sharon Low, Lai Kin Ngoh	Bowling
1997	Malaysia men's national squash team Kenneth Low, Ong Beng Hee, Yap Kok Four, Ricky Lee Weng Ong	Squash	Nurul Hudda Baharin and Noriha Abdul Rani	Shooting
1998	Malaysia men's national field hockey team Mirnawan Nawawi, Nor Saiful Zaini Nasiruddin, R. Shankar, Chairil Anwar Aziz, Roslan Jamaluddin, Calvin Fernandez, Nor Azlan Bakar, Maninderjit Singh, Lam Mun Fatt, Nasihin Nubli Ibrahim, K. Keevan Raj, K. Logan Raj, Chua Boon Huat, Suhaimi Ibrahim, S. Kuhan, M. Kaliswaran	Field Hockey	Carolyn Au Yong, El Regina Tajudin, Sarina Sundara Rajah, Thye Chee Kiat	Rhythmic Gymnastics
1999				
2000	none awarded	none awarded	Malaysia women's national squash team Nicol David, Sharon Wee Ee Lin, Tricia Chuah	Squash
2001	Mohd. Shaaban Mohd. Hussin, Mohd. Sahal Saidin, S. Siva Chandhran, Airil Rizman Zahari	Golf	Premila Supramaniam, Sri Raja Rajeswari Murugayan, Ng Chai Lin, Lee Phei Sze	Karate
2002	none awarded	none awarded	Malaysia women's national squash team Nicol David, Sharon Wee Ee Lin, Lim Yoke Wah, Tricia Chuah	Squash
2003	Malaysia men's national bowling team Azidi Ameran, Zulmazran Zulkifli, Jonathan Lim, Alex Liew, Daniel Lim, Ben Heng	Bowling	Malaysia women's national bowling team Shalin Zulkifli, Sarah Yap, Choy Poh Lai, Wendy Chai, Sharon Chai, Lai Kin Ngoh	Bowling
2004	none awarded	none awarded	Malaysia women's national squash team Nicol David, Sharon Wee Ee Lin, Delia Odette Arnold, Tricia Chuah	Squash
2005	Safuan Said and Fairul Izwan Abdul Muin	Lawn Bowls	none awarded	none awarded
2006	Malaysia men's national bowling team Alex Liew, Aaron Kong, Azidi Ameran, Ben Heng, Daniel Lim, Zulmazran Zulkifli	Bowling	Nur Iryani Azmi, Azlina Arshad, Norhashimah Ismail	Lawn bowls
2007	Malaysia men's national archery team Cheng Chu Sian, Muhammad Marbawi Sulaiman, Wan Mohd Khalmizam Wan Abdul Aziz	Archery	Malaysia women's national bowling team Choy Poh Lai, Shalin Zulkifli, Zandra Aziela Ibrahim, Eshter Cheah Mei Lan, Wendy Chai De Choo, Sharon Koh Suet Len	Bowling
2008	Malaysia men's national archery team Cheng Chu Sian, Muhammad Marbawi Sulaiman, Wan Mohd Khalmizam Wan Abdul Aziz	Archery	Malaysia women's national squash team Nicol David, Low Wee Wern, Delia Odette Arnold, Sharon Wee Ee Lin	Squash
2009	Malaysia national under-23 football team Ahmad Fakri Saarani, Mohd Amar Rohidan, Mazlizam Mohamad, Mohd Farizal Marlias, Baddrol Bakhtiar, Mohd Sabre Mat Abu, Amirul Hadi Zainal, Mohd Asraruddin Putra Omar, Mohd Nasriq Baharom, Kunanlan Subramaniam, Mohd Aidil Zafuan Abdul Radzak, Mohd Zaquan Adha Abdul Radzak, Abdul Manaf Mamat, Mohd Sharbinee Allawee Ramli, Gurusamy Govandar Kandasamy, Mahali Jasuli, Mohd Muslim Ahmad, Mohd Azmi Muslim, Norshahrul Idlan Talaha, Mohd Safiq Rahim	Football	Pandelela Rinong and Leong Mun Yee	Diving
2010	Malaysia men's national field hockey team Azlan Misron, Azreen Rizal Nasir, Baljit Singh Charun, Faizal Saari, Hafifihafiz Hanafi, Izwan Firdaus Ahmad Tajuddin, Kumar Subramaniam, Mohamad Sukri Abdul Mutalib, Mohd Madzli Ikmar Mohd Nor, Mohd Shahrun Nabil Abdullah, Muhamad Amin Rahim, Muhammad Marhan Mohd Jalil, Muhammad Razie Abdul Rahim, Nabil Fiqri Mohd Nor, Roslan Jamaluddin, Tengku Ahmad Tajudin Abdul Jalil	Field Hockey	Malaysia women's national squash team Nicol David, Low Wee Wern, Delia Odette Arnold, Sharon Wee Ee Lin	Squash
2011	Malaysia men's national archery team Cheng Chu Sian, Khairul Anuar Mohamad, Haziq Kamaruddin	Archery	Malaysia women's national synchronised swimming team Katrina Ann Abdul Hadi, Png Hui Chuen, Lee Zhien Huey, Yeo Pei Ling, Tan May Mei, Mandy Yeap Mun Xin, Tasha Jane Taher Ali, Gan Zhen Yu, Lee Yhing Huey, Emanuelle Mah Thil Da	Synchronized; Swimming
2012	Malaysia men's national junior field hockey team Mohd Hazrul Faiz, Norhizat Sumantri, Faiz Helmi Jali, Muhamad Ramadhan Rosli, Shazrul Imran Nazli, Mohamad Syamim Mohd Yusof, Mohd Fitri Saari, Muhammad Noor Faieez Ibrahim, Shazril Irwan Nazli, Faizal Saari, Dedy Ariyadi Jumaidi, Muhammad Aslam Mohammad Hanafiah, Muhammad Firhan Ashaari, Amir Farid Ahmad Fuzi, Shahrul Azaddin Aus Karzie, Mohammad Izat Hakimi Jamaluddin, Kavin Kartik Govindasamy, Mohamad Azri Hassan	Field Hockey	Malaysia women's national squash team Nicol David, Low Wee Wern, Delia Odette Arnold, Siti Munirah Jusoh	Squash
2013	Malaysia men's national junior field hockey team Mohamad Hazrul Faiz Ahmad Sobri, Mohd Nor Aqmal Abdul Ghaffar, Muhammad Hafiz Zainol, Mohd Fitri Saari, Muhamad Azuan Hasan, Shazril Irwan Nazli, Muhammad Firhan Ashaari, Muhammad Rashid Baharom, Mohamad Syamim Mohd Yusof, Muhammad Haziq Samsul, Joel Samuel van Huizen, Muhammad Shahril Saabah, Muhammad Hafizuddin Othman, Izad Hakimi Jamaluddin, Karthik Govindasamy, Muhammad Azri Hassan, Zulhairi Hashim, Faiz Helmi Jali	Field Hockey	Pandelela Rinong and Leong Mun Yee	Diving
2014	Malaysia's 420 Dinghy team Mohd Faizal Norizan, Ahmad Shukri Abd. Aziz	Sailing	Malaysia women's national squash team Nicol David, Low Wee Wern, Delia Odette Arnold, Zulhijjah Azan, Vanessa Raj	Squash
2015	Malaysia men's national archery (compound) team Juwaidi Marzuki, Zulfadhli Ruslan, Muhammad Zaki Mahazan, Lee Kin Lip	Archery	Malaysia women's national archery (compound) team Fatin Nurfatehah Mat Salleh, Saritha Cham Nong, Nur Rizah Ishak, Nurhayati Al-Madihah Hashim	Archery
2016	Tan Wee Kiong and Goh V Shem	Badminton	Pandelela Rinong and Cheong Jun Hoong	Diving
2017	Malaysia men's national field hockey team	Field Hockey	Malaysia women's national bowling team	Bowling
2018	Adrian Ang and Tun Ameerul Luqman Al-Hakeem	Bowling	Cheong Jun Hoong and Pandelela Rinong	Diving
2019/2020	Muhammad Rafiq Ismail Ahmad Muaz Mohd Fishol Muhammad Syafiq Ridhwan Abdul Malek	Bowling	Pandelela Rinong and Leong Mun Yee	Diving
2021	Aaron Chia and Soh Wooi Yik	Badminton	Natasha Mohamed Roslan Faten Najihah Ahmad Naik Siti Safiyah Amirah Abdul Rahman and Nur Syazwani Shahar	Bowling
2022	Malaysia men's national field hockey team	Field Hockey	Pearly Tan and Thinaah Muralitharan	Badminton
2023	Syafiq Ridhwan and Ahmad Muaz	Bowling	Aleena Nawawi and Nur Ain Nabilah Tarmizi	Lawn bowls
2024	Malaysia men's national sepak takraw team	Sepak takraw	Malaysia women's national bowling team	Bowling
2025	Malaysia men's national sepak takraw team	Sepak takraw	Malaysia women's national wushu team	Wushu

=== National Paralympian Sportsman and Sportswoman of the Year ===
Before 2005, the National Paralympian Sportsman and Sportswoman of the Year were awarded at a separate award ceremony.

Year	National Paralympian Sportsman of the Year		National Paralympian Sportswoman of the Year	
Year	Name	Sport	Name	Sport
2005	Mohd Salam Sidik	Para Archery	Siow Lee Chan	Para Powerlifting
2006	Faridul Masri	Para Athletics	Zainab Mohamad Ashari	Para Athletics
2007	Mohd Salam Sidik	Para Archery	none awarded	none awarded
2008	Zul Amirul Sidi Abdullah	Para Swimming	Siow Lee Chan	Para Powerlifting
2009	Mohd Salam Sidik	Para Archery	Norhayati Sanoh	Para Lawn Bowls
2010	Zul Amirul Sidi Abdullah	Para Swimming	Nabilah Ahmad Sharif	Para Badminton
2011	Mohd Salam Sidik	Para Archery	Hemala Devi Enikutty	Para Athletics
2012	Hasihin Sanawi	Para Archery	none awarded	none awarded
2013	Muhammad Ziyad Zolkefli	Para Athletics	Hemala Devi Enikutty	Para Athletics
2014	Muhammad Azlan Mat Lazin	Para Athletics	Siti Nor Iasah Mohd Ariffin	Para Athletics
2015	Mohamad Ridzuan Mohamad Puzi	Para Athletics	Felicia Mikat	Para Athletics
2016	none awarded	none awarded	Siti Noor Radiah Ismail	Para Athletics
2017	Muhammad Ziyad Zolkefli	Para Athletics	none awarded	none awarded
2018	Mohamad Ridzuan Mohamad Puzi	Para Athletics	Siti Nor Iasah Mohd Ariffin	Para Athletics
2019/20	S Suresh	Para Archery	none awarded	none awarded
2021	Bonnie Bunyau Gustin	Para Powerlifting	Brenda Anellia Larry	Para Swimming
2022	Cheah Liek Hou	Para Badminton	Carmen Lim	Para Swimming
2023	Bonnie Bunyau Gustin	Para Powerlifting	Nur Suraiya Muhamad Zamri and Farina Shawati Mohd Adnan	Para Cycling
2024	Bonnie Bunyau Gustin	Para Powerlifting	Hasmunirah Malik	Para Lawn Bowls
2025	Mohamad Yusof Hafizi Shaharuddin	Para Cycling	Carmen Lim	Para Swimming

=== National Men's and Women's Coach of the Year ===
Before 2005, the National Men's and Women's Coach of the Year were awarded at a separate award ceremony, namely Anugerah Jurulatih Kebangsaan.

Year	National Men's Coach of the Year		National Women's Coach of the Year	
Year	Name	Sport	Name	Sport
2001	Misbun Sidek	Badminton		
2002	Misbun Sidek	Badminton	Choo Yih Hwa	Lawn bowls
2003	none awarded	none awarded	none awarded	none awarded
2004	Yap Kim Hock	Badminton	none awarded	none awarded
2005	Ng Joo Ngan	Cycling	none awarded	none awarded
2006	Mohd Ariffin Ghani	Lawn bowls	Choo Yih Hwa	Lawn bowls
2007	P. Arivalagan	Karate	Yoong Sze Yuin	Basketball
2008	Misbun Sidek	Badminton	none awarded	none awarded
2009	Yoong Thong Foong	Wushu	none awarded	none awarded
2009	Rajagobal Krishnasamy	Football	none awarded	none awarded
2010	Stephen van Huizen	Field Hockey	none awarded	none awarded
2010	Tai Beng Hai	Field Hockey	none awarded	none awarded
2011	Syed Mohd Hussaini Mazlan	Cycling	Rosniza Abu Bakar	Rhythmic Gymnastics
2012	Rashid Sidek	Badminton	none awarded	none awarded
2013	Muhammad Dhaarma Raj Abdullah	Field Hockey	none awarded	none awarded
2014	R. Jaganathan	Athletics	none awarded	none awarded
2015	Nasri Nasir	Pencak silat	Norsham Yoon	Para Athletics
2016	R. Jaganathan	Para Athletics	Chin Eei Hui	Badminton
2017	Poad Md Kassim	Athletics	Yoong Sze Yuin	Basketball
2018	Holloway Cheah	Bowling	none awarded	none awarded
2019/ 2020	Marzuki Zakaria	Para Archery	Nor Hashimah Ismail	Lawn bowls
2021	Jamil Adam	Para Powerlifting	Wendy Chai De-Choo	Bowling
2022	A. Arul Selvaraj	Field Hockey	Beh Lee Wei	Table Tennis
2023	Zuraidi Puteh	Lawn bowls	Wendy Chai De-Choo	Bowling
2024	Jamil Adam	Para Powerlifting	Siti Rahmah Mohamed Nasir	Pencak Silat
2025	Ahmad Jais Baharun	Sepak takraw	Nor Hamizah Abu Hassan	Pencak Silat

=== National Most Promising Sportsman and Sportswoman Award ===
The Most Promising Sportsman and Sportswoman Award discontinued to be awarded since 2002.

Year	National Most Promising Sportsman of the Year		National Most Promising Sportswoman of the Year	
Year	Name	Sport	Name	Sport
1977	Sportsboy of the Year: Tam Kam Seng	Field Hockey	Sportsgirl of the Year: Saik Oik Lum	Athletics
1985	Rashid Sidek	Badminton	May Tan	Swimming
1986	R. Selvamuthu	Taekwondo	Josephine Mary Singarayar	Athletics
1987	Jeffrey Ong	Swimming	Rosemary Yap	Taekwondo
1988	Sportsboy of the Year: Sean Paul	Athletics	Sportsgirl of the Year: Nooralleyshah Sadiman	Field Hockey
1988	Nur Herman Majid	Athletics	Karen Lian	Bowling
1989				
1990				
1991				
1992				
1993				
1994	Ong Beng Hee	Squash		
1995				
1996	Alex Lim Keng Liat	Swimming	Nicol David	Squash
1997	S. Arul Vivasan	Cricket	Jacquelyn Yvonne Chan	Synchronized Swimming
1998	C. Muralitharan	Karate	Joanne Quay	Badminton
1999	Yeoh Ken Nee	Diving	Noraseela Mohd Khalid	Athletics
2000	Chua Boon Huat	Field Hockey	Tricia Chuah	Squash
2001	Muhamad Zaiful Zainal Abidin	Athletics	Siow Yi Ting	Swimming

=== Sport Leadership Award ===
Hamzah Abu Samah was the inaugural winner of the sport leadership award in 1984.

- 1984: Hamzah Abu Samah – Former President of the Olympic Council of Malaysia
- 1985: No award
- 1986: No award
- 1987: Khir Johari – Former Deputy President of the Olympic Council of Malaysia
- 1988: Thong Poh Nyen – Former Olympic Council of Malaysia Secretary
- 1989:Tan Sri Elyas Omar – Former Malaysia National Cycling Federation President
- 1990:Tunku Imran Tuanku Ja'afar – Former Squash Racket Association of Malaysia President
- 1991:Tan Sri Murad Ahmad – Former Prisons Department of Malaysia Director General
- 1992:Government of the State of Sarawak
- 1993:Tan Sri Abu Zarim Omar – Former Paralympic Council of Malaysia President
- 1994:SMK Padang Midin, Kuala Terenganu
- 1995:Majlis Sukan Daerah Rompin
- 1996: Combined Old Boys' Rugby Association (Cobra)
- 1997: The Organising Committee for Universiti Sains Malaysia-Penang Hockey Carnival
- 1998:
- 1999: Noh Abdullah – Founding President of the Malaysian Amateur Baseball Association
- 1999: Mohamad Taha Ariffin – Former Vice-President of the Football Association of Malaysia
- 2000: Gan Boon Leong – Former President of the Malaysian Bodybuilding Federation
- 2000: Darshan Singh Gill – Former President of the Asian Cycling Confederation
- 2001: H. R. M. Storey – Former Treasurer of the Malaysian Body Building Federation
- 2002: Ramlan Harun – Executive Director for the Asian PGA
- 2003: Peter Velappan – Former Secretary-General of the Asian Football Confederation
- 2004: Rosmanizam Abdullah – Former Secretary-General of the Malay Cricket Association of Malaysia
- 2005: P. S. Nathan – Malaysian Tenpin Bowling Congress President
- 2006: Thomas Lee Mun Lung – Malaysian Golf Association President
- 2006: Ahmad Sarji Abdul Hamid – Malaysian Lawn Bowls Federation President
- 2007: Paul Mony Samuel – Former Secretary-General of the Asian Football Confederation
- 2008: Ho Koh Chye – Former Malaysian Chef-de-Mission to the Beijing Olympics, former national field hockey coach and player
- 2009: Edmund Yong – Former Asia-Pacific Golf Confederation Secretary-General
- 2010: W. Y. Chin – President of the Malaysian Snooker and Billiards Federation and Vice-President of the Olympic Council of Malaysia
- 2011: Kee Yong Wee – Former Wushu Federation of Malaysia President
- 2012: Paul Mony Samuel – FIFA Development Officers, former Secretary-General of the Asian Football Confederation
- 2012: Abu Samah Abdul Wahab – Malaysian National Cycling Federation President
- 2013: Mohammad Anwar Mohammad Nor – President of the Malaysian Golf Association
- 2014: Ong Poh Eng – President of the Malaysian Weightlifting Federation
- 2015: Yeoh Choo Hock – Former Secretary-General of Asian Basketball Confederation
- 2015: Kamaruzzaman Abu Kassim – President of the Malaysian Sailing Authority
- 2016: N. Shanmuganrajah – Malaysian Gymnastics Federation Secretary
- 2016: Mohd Ali Rustam – National Silat Association of Malaysia President
- 2017: Wan Nawawi Wan Ismail – Malaysia Lawn Bowls Federation President
- 2018: Sieh Kok Chi – Former Olympic Council of Malaysia Secretary
- 2018: S. Radha Krishnan – Malaysian Blind Sports Association President
- 2019/20: Allahyarham Datuk Seri Zolkples Embong – Former Director General National Sports Council of Malaysia
- 2019/20: Datuk S Vegiyathuman – Former Secretary General Kuala Lumpur Athletics Association
- 2019/20: Lt Kdr (B) Kamaruzaman Kadir – National Powerlifting Association of Malaysia
- 2022: Prof Datuk Dr. Abdullah Mohammad Said - Football Association of Malaysia
- 2023: Tan Sri Dato’ Haji Mohd Khalid Mohd Yunus - Former Malaysia Amateur Athletic Federation president
- 2024: Tan Sri Dato' Sri Mohamad Norza Zakaria - Former Badminton Association of Malaysia president and current Olympic Council of Malaysia president
- 2025: Dato' Haji Mohd Sumali Reduan - President Sepaktakraw Association of Malaysia (PSM)

=== Sport Icon/Personality Award ===
Tunku Abdul Rahman was the first recipient of the prestigious award in 1978.

- 1978: Tunku Abdul Rahman – Former Prime Minister of Malaysia
- 1979: No award
- 1980: No award
- 1981: No award
- 1982: No award
- 1983: No award
- 1984: No award
- 1985: Sultan Ahmad Shah – Former Yang di-Pertuan Agong, former President of the Football Association of Malaysia
- 1986:
- 1987:
- 1988: Abdul Razak Hussein – Former Prime Minister of Malaysia, former President of the Asian Hockey Federation
- 1989:
- 1990:
- 1991: No award
- 1992:
- 1993:
- 1994:
- 1995: Toh Puan Dato' Seri Hajjah Saadiah Sardon – Former President of the Women Football Association of Malaysia
- 1996: No award
- 1997: Khir Johari – Former Deputy President of the Olympic Council of Malaysia
- 1998: Hamzah Abu Samah – Former FIFA vice-president and International Olympic Committee member, former President of the Asian Football Confederation,
- 1999: Alexander Lee Yu Lung – Former President of the Malaysian Volleyball Association and also of the Squash Racquets Association of Malaysia, former vice-chairman of the Commonwealth Games Federation
- 2000: No award
- 2001: No award
- 2002: Ghazali Shafie – Former President of the Malaysian Amateur Athletic Union
- 2003: Mahathir Mohamad – Former Prime Minister of Malaysia
- 2004: No award
- 2005: Abdul Ghafar Baba – Former Deputy Prime Minister of Malaysia, former President of the Lawn Tennis Association of Malaysia
- 2006: Sultan Azlan Shah – Former Yang di-Pertuan Agong, former Malaysian Chef-de-Mission to the Montreal Olympics, former President of the Asian Hockey Federation
- 2007: Harun Idris – Former Malaysian Chef-de-Mission to the Munich Olympics, former President of the Football Association of Selangor
- 2008: No award
- 2009: No award
- 2010: No award
- 2011: No award
- 2012: Tan Sri Elyas Omar – Former Malaysian Chef-de-Mission to the Barcelona Olympics, former President of the Badminton Association of Malaysia,
- 2013: No award
- 2014: No award
- 2015: Mani Jegathesan – Asian Amateur Athletics Association Medical Committee chairman, former National Sportsman of the Year
- 2015: Ahmad Sarji Abdul Hamid – Chairman of Professional Golf of Malaysia, former President of the Asian Lawn Bowls Federation, former President of the Malaysia Lawn Bowls Federation, former President of the Malay Cricket Association of Malaysia
- 2016: Tunku Imran Tuanku Ja'afar – President of the Olympic Council of Malaysia
- 2016: Tun Jeanne Abdullah – Patron of the Paralympic Council of Malaysia
- 2017: Sultan Ahmad Shah – Former Yang di-Pertuan Agong, former President of the Football Association of Malaysia
- 2018: No award
- 2019/20: Dato' Sieh Kok Chi – Former Secretary General of Olympic Council of Malaysia
- 2021: Datuk Hajjah Norminshah Sabirin – Former President of Netball Association of Malaysia
- 2022: Datuk Wira Mazlan Ahmad - Former director general of National Sports Council of Malaysia
- 2023: Datuk Dr. P. S. Nathan
- 2024: Tun Seri Setia Dr. Hj. Mohd Ali Mohd Rustam

=== Special Award ===
Sidek Abdullah Kamar became the first recipient of the Special Award in 1986.

- 1986: Sidek Abdullah Kamar – Former national badminton coach
- 1987: No award
- 1988: Christopher Chan Yan Kin – Former national squash champion
- 1988: 1949 Thomas Cup badminton team (Ooi Teik Hock, Teoh Seng Khoon, Chan Kok Leong, Yeoh Teck Chye, Lim Kee Fong, Wong Peng Soon, Ong Poh Lim, Law Teik Hock)
- 1988: 1952 Thomas Cup badminton team (Wong Peng Soon, Ooi Teik Hock, Chan Kok Leong, Abdullah Piruz, Ong Poh Lim, Ismail Marjan)
- 1988: 1955 Thomas Cup badminton team (Ong Poh Lim, Wong Peng Soon, Eddy Choong, Ooi Teik Hock, Lim Kee Fong, Tan Jin Eong)
- 1989:
- 1990:
- 1991: No award
- 1992:
- 1993:
- 1994:
- 1995:
- 1996: Fathil Mahmood – Former Equestrian Association of Malaysia Vice-President
- 1996: A. Vaithilingam – Veteran athletics official
- 1997: Daniel Lim – Retired national bowler
- 1997: Sharon Low Su Lin – Retired national bowler
- 1997: Tham Siew Kai – Former Sarawak Amateur Athletics Association Honorary Secretary
- 1997: S. Kathiravale – Former national football referee and hockey umpire
- 1998: Harjit Singh – Former Deputy President of the Malaysian Cricket Association
- 1999:
- 2000: Ishtiaq Mubarak – Former national athlete and coach, Asian Games silver medalist in men's 110 metres hurdles
- 2000: Karamjit Singh – Retired Malaysian professional race driver in rallying, the first Asian to win the FIA Production World Rally Championship
- 2000: Awang Kamaruddin Abdul Ghani – Retired Malaysian horse racer
- 2001: Leonard A. de Vries – Former national coaching committee chairman
- 2001: Mary Ong Kwe Kee – Petaling Jaya Municipal Council squash coordinator
- 2002: A. Perumal – Former Merdeka Stadium ground specialist
- 2002: Abdul Malik Jeremiah – Equestrian
- 2003: Abdul Majid Muda – Former Pahang Weightlifting Association Vice-President
- 2003: Loh Beng Hooi – Former Sabah Karate Association Vice-President
- 2003: Durbara Singh – National tennis coach
- 2004: S. Satgunam – Former Malaysian Hockey Federation Secretary
- 2004: Chin Mee Keong – Malaysian Taekwondo Association (MTA) chairman
- 2005: M. K. Nathan – Veteran national cricket coach
- 2005: Azmi Shaari – Former Secretary-General of the Sepak Takraw Association of Malaysia
- 2005: Zainal Abidin Abu Zarin – President of Malaysian Paralympic Council and President of Asian Paralympic Committee
- 2006: Balwant Singh Kler – Secretary General of the Asian Triathlon Confederation
- 2006: Yeoh Cheang Swi – Former rugby player
- 2006: Krishnan Thambusamy – Former athlete
- 2007: Willy Chang Chia Chun – Former national tennis coach
- 2007: C. Paramalingam – Former national field hockey coach
- 2008: Petrina Low Lai Hun – Former national rhythmic gymnastic coach
- 2008: Nellan Vellasamy – National professional golfer
- 2009: Ponniyah Thulukanam – Former national karate coach
- 2010: Nashatar Singh Sidhu – Former Asian Games gold medallist in men's javelin throw
- 2010: Lim Tiong Kiat – Honorary Treasurer of the Badminton Association of Malaysia
- 2011: Shaharudin Jaafar – Former national cycling champion
- 2012: Muhammad Zulfahmi Khairuddin – World Moto3 Grand Prix racer
- 2012: Ng Chow Seng – Former national weightlifting champion
- 2013: Moe Chin Kiat – Former national badminton chief coach
- 2013: Mohd Nazar Abdul Rahim – Former national shot put coach
- 2014: Peter Rajah – Former national footballer
- 2014: Mohd Afendy Abdullah – National sailing coach
- 2015: No award
- 2016: Mohd Morshidi Abdul Ghani – Sarawak State Secretary
- 2016: Dina Rizal – SportsUnite sports club chairman
- 2017: Hafizh Syahrin Abdullah – MotoGP rider
- 2017: Johor Darul Ta'zim F.C. – Football club
- 2018: Rahim Razali – Sport announcer
- 2018: Hanifah Yoong – Waterski
- 2022: Desmond David and Ann Marie David (parents of Datuk Nicol David), Datuk Fauzi Omar (former president of The Sports Writers Association of Malaysia), Ahmad Merican Othman (Ministry of Education) and Soh Wai Ching (tower running athlete)
- 2023: Qabil Irfan Azlan – MotoGP rider
- 2025: Allahyarham Datuk Hishamuddin Aun (former The New Straits Times Press (NSTP) editor-in-chief), Kelab Renang Ikan Bilis, Petronas

=== TM Team Malaysia Award ===
The TM Team Malaysia Award first introduced in 2013 by Telekom Malaysia. The winner would be selected by sports fans in the country via social website voting.

- 2013: Sazali Samad – Ten-time world bodybuilding champion. See also: List of World Amateur Bodybuilding Championships medalists
- 2014: Syakilla Salni Jefri Krisnan – Karateka
- 2015:
  - Favourite Athlete: Goh Jin Wei – Badminton player
  - Best Moment: 2012 London Olympic Games – Pandelela Rinong, first female athlete to win an Olympic medal for Malaysia
  - Best Team: 1992 Thomas Cup – Badminton pair, Cheah Soon Kit / Soo Beng Kiang delivered a winning (3–2) set games for Malaysia to win the Thomas Cup
- 2016: Azizulhasni Awang– Track cyclist

== See also ==
- Sports in Malaysia
- Athlete of the Year
