= Mohamed Din bin Ahmad =

Malaysian physician and public health administrator (1912–1999)

Tan Sri Mohamed Din bin Ahmad
- Born: 26 January 1912; Siputeh, Perak, Federated Malay States
- Died: 28 February 1999 (aged 87); Kuala Lumpur, Malaysia
- Education: Victoria Institution; King Edward VII College of Medicine, Singapore; University of Edinburgh; London School of Hygiene & Tropical Medicine
- Occupations: Physician, public health administrator
- Known for: First Malaysian Director-General of Health; founding Master of the Academy of Medicine of Malaysia

Tan Sri Dr Mohamed Din bin Ahmad (26 January 1912 – 28 February 1999), also known as Mohd Din bin Ahmad, was a Malaysian physician and public health administrator. He served as the first Malaysian Director-General of Health from 1967 to 1971 and was the inaugural Master of the Academy of Medicine of Malaysia, elected in 1966.

A former student of Victoria Institution in Kuala Lumpur, Mohamed Din was among the early Malay medical graduates who entered government medical service before the Second World War. His career encompassed clinical medicine, public health, medical administration and professional leadership.

== Early life and education ==
Mohamed Din was born on 26 January 1912 in Siputeh, Perak, in the Federated Malay States. He initially attended a Malay school in Setapak before entering the primary section of Victoria Institution in Kuala Lumpur in 1921. Following the establishment of Maxwell School in 1924, he was transferred there and subsequently returned to Victoria Institution for his secondary education.

During his school years, Mohamed Din distinguished himself in academic and extracurricular activities. He received the Treacher Scholarship in 1928 and participated in cricket, school debates and the cadet corps. He also served as the first president of the school's Geographical Society.

In 1930, he was appointed School Captain of Victoria Institution. His appointment is recorded in the school's historical honour board.

After completing his secondary education, he received a government scholarship to study medicine at the King Edward VII College of Medicine in Singapore. During his medical training, he was active in student organisations and sport, serving as president of the College Club and captain of its cricket team.

He graduated in 1937 with the Licentiate in Medicine and Surgery (LMS) qualification.

== Medical career ==
=== Early medical service ===
Following his medical qualification in 1937, Mohamed Din entered the British Malayan government medical service and was posted to Kuala Kangsar in Perak as an Assistant Medical Officer.

During his early career, he held medical appointments in Perak and Terengganu. His work in government medical services provided experience in clinical medicine, district health administration and the delivery of healthcare across different regions of Malaya.

=== Postgraduate education ===
In 1949, Mohamed Din received a Queen's Scholarship to undertake postgraduate medical education in the United Kingdom. He was identified in the historical records of Victoria Institution as the first recipient of the Queen's Scholarship in the post-war period.

He undertook public health studies at the University of Edinburgh and tropical medicine training in London. He obtained a Diploma in Public Health in 1950 and a Diploma in Tropical Medicine and Hygiene in 1951.

He also received support from the National Association for the Prevention of Tuberculosis to undertake additional training related to tuberculosis.

Upon returning to Malaya in 1952, he served as Medical and Health Officer in Perak. In 1953, he became Chief Medical Officer of Terengganu. He was appointed Assistant Director of Medical Services in 1956.

=== Senior health administration ===
Following the independence of the Federation of Malaya in 1957, Mohamed Din advanced to senior positions in the national medical administration. His responsibilities included leadership within the medical services and the Ministry of Health.

He served as Permanent Secretary of the Ministry of Health before assuming the position of Director-General of Health. His appointment to the latter office is dated 6 December 1967 in a published biographical account.

== Director-General of Health ==
Mohamed Din served as Malaysia's first Director-General of Health from 1967 to 1971. His tenure formed part of the early development of Malaysia's national healthcare administration following independence and the formation of Malaysia in 1963.

His role involved senior administrative responsibility for the country's government medical and health services.

A record preserved by the National Archives of Malaysia identifies Mohamed Din as Director-General of Medical Services in September 1970. On 9 September 1970, he chaired the first meeting of an interdepartmental coordination committee on narcotics in Kuala Lumpur. The meeting involved senior representatives of government departments and agencies.

Mohamed Din was succeeded as Director-General of Health by Abdul Majid bin Ismail, who held the office from 1971 to 1976.

== Professional leadership ==
=== Malayan Medical Association ===
Mohamed Din was active in the national medical profession and served as president of the Malayan Medical Association in 1961.

A retrospective account of the association's first decade, written by A. A. Sandosham and published in the Medical Journal of Malaya in June 1970, includes Mohamed Din among its early presidents.

=== Academy of Medicine of Malaysia ===
Mohamed Din played a significant role in the early history of the Academy of Medicine of Malaysia.

Following Singapore's separation from Malaysia in August 1965, an autonomous Malaysian Academy of Medicine was established in 1966. The organisation was registered on 22 December 1966 and adopted the motto Terus Maju.

Mohamed Din was elected its first Master. The Academy brought together medical specialists from different disciplines under a national professional organisation.

His appointment as the Academy's inaugural Master placed him among the early leaders of organised specialist medicine in Malaysia.

== Honours and recognition ==
Mohamed Din received the federal honour of Panglima Mangku Negara (PMN), carrying the title Tan Sri, in 1961.

In September 1972, the University of Malaya conferred an honorary doctorate upon Mohamed Din in recognition of his services. The award was recorded in the National Archives of Malaysia's documentation of a special university convocation held on 29 September 1972.

== Death and legacy ==
Mohamed Din died on 28 February 1999 in Kuala Lumpur, aged 87. He was buried at Bukit Kiara Cemetery.

He is remembered in Malaysian medical history for his service as the country's first Malaysian Director-General of Health and as the founding Master of the Academy of Medicine of Malaysia. His career also illustrates the contribution of the early generation of Malay medical professionals to the development of government healthcare services and professional medical institutions.

His achievements have also been documented in the historical records of Victoria Institution, where he served as School Captain in 1930.

== See also ==
- Ministry of Health (Malaysia)
- Director-General of Health (Malaysia)
- Victoria Institution
- Academy of Medicine of Malaysia
- Healthcare in Malaysia
