= Sidek =

Sidek is a surname or patronym. Notable people with the name include:

- Khadijah Sidek (1918–1982), Malay nationalist and politician
- The Sidek brothers, a Malaysian family with a significant history within professional badminton:
  - Misbun Sidek (born 1960), Malaysian badminton player
  - Razif Sidek (born 1962), Malaysian badminton player and coach
  - Jalani Sidek (born 1963), Malaysian badminton player and coach
  - Rahman Sidek (born 1968), Malaysian badminton player and coach
  - Rashid Sidek (born 1968), Malaysian badminton player and coach
