= Siudek =

Siudek is a Polish surname. Notable people with the surname include:

- Dorota Siudek (born 1975), Polish pair skater and coach, wife of Mariusz
- Mariusz Siudek (born 1972), Polish pair skater

== See also ==
- Sidek
