= Squash at the 2000 Commonwealth Youth Games =

Squash at the I Commonwealth Youth Games
- Dates: 10 – 14 August
- Host city: Edinburgh, Scotland
- Venue: Heriot Watt University
- Events: 1
- Participation: 24 athletes from 8 nations

At the 2000 Commonwealth Youth Games, the Squash events were held at the Heriot Watt University Centre in Edinburgh, Scotland from 10 to 14 August. The format was a team event made up of male and female members. The first and third tie being male match-ups, the second being a female match. All matches were completed to provide a final score. Any non-completed games were awarded a walkover.

The format was a ranking round where each nation played 4 games. Tiebreaks were decided first on head and then on leg difference. This created the ranking round pairs to decide the medals and final positions.

== Medal summary ==
=== Medal table ===
* Host nation ( SCO)

Rank	Nation	Gold	Silver	Bronze	Total
1	ENG	1	0	0	1
2	AUS	0	1	0	1
3	MAS	0	0	1	1
Totals (3 entries)		1	1	1	3

== Squad List ==
=== Squad List ===
Participating teams and rosters
England	Australia	Malaysia	Wales	Scotland	Canada	Barbados	Northern Ireland
James Willstrop; Jenny Duncalf; Amina Helal; Daryl Selby; Adrian Walker	Cameron Pilley; Sarah Dubois; Simon Carruthers; Matt Sanders; Amelia Pittock	Marcus Yeap; Tricia Chuah; Delia Arnold; Keith Ho Man Kit	Abdul Khan; Hayley James; Stacey Preece; Gareth Jones	Innes Young; Caron Lawrie; Nichola Johnston; Steven Baker; Alistair Livingstone	Jamie Martell; Neha Kumar; Kyla Grigg; Greg Hutner; Andrew Jones	Gavin Cumberbatch; Regan Roett; Shawn Simpson; Andrea Goodridge	Dwayne Owens; Tanya Owens; Dan Roberts

== Ranking Rounds ==
Team	Pts	Pld	W	D	L	GF	GA
1. Australia (AUS)	4	4	4	0	0	11	1
2. England (ENG)	4	4	4	0	0	11	1
3. Malaysia (MAS)	2	4	2	0	2	7	4
4. Wales (WAL)	2	4	2	0	2	5	7
5. Scotland (SCO)	2	4	2	0	2	6	6
6. Canada (CAN)	2	4	2	0	2	6	6
7. Northern Ireland (NIR)	0	4	0	0	4	1	11
8. Barbados (BAR)	0	4	0	0	4	0	12

Note: Wales were progressed to the Bronze medal match based upon a better head to head with their win over Scotland coupled with Malaysia's better head to head over Canada.

== Ranking Round Results ==
- Scotland 1-2 Wales
- England 3-0 Barbados
- Wales 3-0 Barbados
- England 3-0 Scotland
- Malaysia 3-0 Canada
- Australia 3-0 Northern Ireland
- Canada 3-0 Northern Ireland
- Australia 2-1 Malaysia
- Canada 3-0 Barbados
- Scotland 2-1 Northern Ireland
- Australia 3-0 Wales
- England 2-1 Malaysia
- Malaysia 3-0 Northern Ireland
- Australia 3-0 Canada
- Scotland 3-0 Barbados
- England 3-0 Wales

== Classification Round Results ==
- 7th/8th Place

Barbados 2-1 Northern Ireland

- 5th/6th Place

Scotland 2-1 Canada

- Bronze Medal Match

Malaysia (bronze) 2-1 Wales

- Gold Medal Match

England (gold) 3-0 Australia (silver)
