= Abdul Latiff bin Abdul Razak =

Malay physician in British Malaya (1889–1956)

Dr. Abdul Latiff bin Abdul Razak
- Born: 1889
- Died: 26 July 1956 (aged 66–67)
- Occupation: Physician
- Known for: Early Malay physician in colonial Malaya; described as a pioneer in contemporary press

Dr. Abdul Latiff bin Abdul Razak (1889 – 26 July 1956) was a Malay physician in British Malaya. A contemporaneous obituary in The Straits Times described him as a "Malay pioneer in medicine". He is included in Faridah Abd Rashid’s biographical compilation of early Malay doctors in Malaya and Singapore (1900–1957).

== Education ==
Abdul Latiff received his education at Sekolah Melayu Sabak Bernam in Selangor, Victoria Institution in Kuala Lumpur and King Edward VII Medical College in Singapore.

Faridah Abd Rashid identifies Abdul Latiff as belonging to the early cohort of Malay doctors trained through the colonial medical education system centred in Singapore in the early twentieth century. A Malaysian historical study notes variations in reported completion dates, citing the 1956 Straits Times obituary while discussing earlier institutional records.

== Career ==
Abdul Latiff served within the colonial medical framework during a period when Malay participation in professional public service positions was expanding. Physicians of his generation were instrumental in extending Western medical practice to local populations in urban and district settings under British administration.

== Honours and recognition ==
Abdul Latiff’s professional standing was acknowledged in contemporary press coverage at the time of his death. His obituary in The Straits Times characterised him as a pioneering Malay figure in medicine.

In Malaysia, institutional recognition of his contribution includes:

- Perpustakaan Dr. Abdul Latiff at the Kuala Lumpur campus of the National University of Malaysia.
- The naming of Jalan Doktor Latiff within the Hospital Kuala Lumpur vicinity, noted in historical literature discussing early Malay physicians.

These commemorations reflect continuing acknowledgment of his role in the early development of Malay participation in Western medicine.

== See also ==
- King Edward VII College of Medicine
