= Anuar Zainal Abidin =

Chief Judge of Malaya
- In office 1994–1997

Personal details
- Born: Gopeng, Perak, British Malaya
- Died: May 18, 2008 (aged 75–76) University of Malaya Medical Centre, Kuala Lumpur
- Education: Lincoln's Inn
- Occupation: Judge

Anuar Zainal Abidin (1932 – 18 May 2008) was a Malaysian judge who served as Chief Judge of Malaya from 1994 to 1997. He was a senior figure in the Malaysian judiciary and later took part in public service through human rights work and royal commissions of inquiry following his retirement.

== Early life and education ==
Anuar Zainal Abidin was born in Gopeng, Perak, in 1932. He received his secondary education at the Victoria Institution in Kuala Lumpur before pursuing legal studies in England. He was admitted to Lincoln's Inn and was called to the Bar of England and Wales in 1963.

== Judicial career ==
Anuar served in the Malaysian judiciary for more than three decades. Among the key positions he held were:

- Judicial Commissioner of the High Court of Malaya in 1978;
- Judge of the High Court in Kuala Lumpur in 1980;
- Chief Judge of Malaya from 1994 until his retirement in 1997.

During his judicial career, he was known for emphasising the rule of law and judicial independence.

== Post-retirement career ==
=== Human Rights Commission of Malaysia ===
In 2000, Anuar was appointed as a Commissioner of the Human Rights Commission of Malaysia (SUHAKAM), serving until 2002. His appointment is recorded in the SUHAKAM Annual Report 2000.

=== Royal Commission of Inquiry ===
In 1999, Anuar chaired the Royal Commission of Inquiry established to investigate the injuries sustained by Datuk Seri Anwar Ibrahim while in police custody. The commission's report is regarded as one of the most significant public inquiries in Malaysian legal history.

== Death ==
Anuar Zainal Abidin died on 18 May 2008 at the University of Malaya Medical Centre in Kuala Lumpur at the age of 76.
