= Mahadev Shankar =

Malaysian lawyer and judge (1932–2026)

Datuk Mahadev Shankar (November 17, 1932 – October 26, 2026) was a Malaysian lawyer and Court of Appeal judge.

== Early years ==
Shankar was born in Peel Avenue, Kuala Lumpur, on November 17, 1932, to a Brahmin family. Growing up with friends of many races, he easily picked up Tamil, Malayalam, Cantonese and Malay.

In 1941, while in Primary 2 of the Pasar Road School, his studies were disrupted by World War II and the Japanese Occupation. His family moved to the Glenmarie Estate near Klang (now in Shah Alam) where most of the Brahmin community had gone, and then stayed with old family friends who had a bungalow off Lorong Seputeh in Old Klang Road. However, by early February 1942, his family returned to Peel Road. Singapore fell on 15 February 1942 and the Japanese took over the administration of the Peninsula immediately after that.

By May 1942, he returned to school where he was taught Japanese songs, and how to read and write Japanese. In March 1943, however, the food shortage had become so chronic that he and his brother had to work in the Oki Denki Kabushiki Kaisha at the PNT workshops near the Kuala Lumpur Railway Station.

After World War II, Shankar joined Victoria Institution. He was active in debating and in drama. He was the first president of the V.I. Dramatics Society, a successor to the long-dormant VIMADS (V.I. Musical and Dramatic Society) of the 1920s. He is well remembered for his title role as Antonio in the Society's first major production, Shakespeare's The Merchant of Venice, which played to packed houses for five nights in August 1952.

He was also the V.I. Rodger Scholar of 1951.

== Legal career ==
Shankar originally wanted to study medicine in Edinburgh. He changed his mind when his father ordered him to go to Singapore on a government scholarship and opt for law. His father was thrilled he chose his family's traditional profession and made immediate arrangements for him to be admitted into the Inner Temple.

He was called to the Bar of the Inner Temple in 1955 and to the Malayan Bar in July 1956. He then enrolled as an Advocate and Solicitor in Malaya whilst in Shearn Delamore and Company, Kuala Lumpur, where he became a partner in 1961. He retired from an active legal career in 1983.

During this period he was actively engaged in general litigation and was a board member of several public companies including Malaysian Airlines System Bhd from 1975 to 1983. He was the legal advisor to the New Straits Times Group on libel laws and the resident representative of the Medical Defence Union.

== Judiciary ==
Shankar was appointed Judge of the High Court in August 1983 and he served in Johor, Kuala Lumpur, and Selangor till 1994 when he was elevated to the Court of Appeal. He retired from the judiciary in November 1997.

Apart from the hundreds of Judgements he has delivered during his tenure as a judge he also served as a Royal Commissioner on two national inquiries and was the Advisory Editor for Halsbury Laws of Malaysia on Civil Procedure.

With specific reference to Arbitration, whilst in practice he has acted as an Arbitrator in the Whitley Council to revise the Wage Structure of the Postal Department of Malaysia, in labour disputes on the first Industrial Arbitration Tribunal, and in private arbitrations in disputes between dissenting partners in legal firms. He delivered the judgement of the Court of Appeal on the inviolability of the awards of the Regional Centre from Judicial review.

He had the personal distinction of serving as a judge when Sultan Azlan Shah, Tun Mohammad Salleh Abas, Tun Abdul Hamid Omar and Tun Eusoff Chin were Lord presidents / Chief Justices.

== Contributions ==
=== Social ===
In the course of his legal and Judicial career he has been a member of the Malaysian Bar Council for many years, and was appointed a member of the National Goodwill Council in 1969, a Royal Commissioner in 1971 for the Reform of the Laws of Marriage and Divorce in Malaysia and for many years he was a member of the Legal Qualifying Board established under the Legal Profession Act.

=== Legal ===
After his retirement from the Judiciary he has acted as an Arbitrator in a corporate dispute between joint venture partners on severance terms, a major dispute between the Owner and Main contractor in one of Kuala Lumpur's prime building projects. The ongoing arbitrations in which he was recently involved included a construction dispute in East Malaysia, and a dispute between two corporate conglomerates on the enforceability of put options.

Shankar was an Honorary Fellow of the Malaysian Institute of Arbitrators, and was a registered Panel member in the Regional Centre of Arbitration Kuala Lumpur and also in the Singapore International Arbitration Centre.

=== Human rights ===
Shankar was one of the founder members of the Human Rights Commission of Malaysia which was established in 1999.

=== Education ===
Shankar was a Visiting Professor to the University of Malaya in 1998 and is currently an Honorary Visiting Professor in Monash University, Melbourne and is also an associate of the College of Law in Sydney for their course on Advocacy for post graduate students.

=== International conferences ===
Shankar also represented Malaysia on several international conferences on a variety of legal subjects. These included:

- Intellectual Property laws in
  - Sydney 1984
  - Canberra 1987
  - New Delhi 1995
  - Tokyo 1997
  - Kanchanaburi, Thailand 1998
- Price Variation and Escalation clauses in International contracts at the Singapore Business Laws Conference
- The Right to a Fair Trial in Heidelberg 1996
- Conferences on Aviation Laws in Dallas 1979, New York 1981, and Taipei in 1990.

== Later life and death ==
Beginning in 1999, he was a Consultant in Zaid Ibrahim and Company which is one of the larger law firms in Malaysia, which also has a branch in Singapore.

Shankar was a Paul Harris Fellow in Rotary International and was recently nominated by the Human Rights Commission of Malaysia as its Advisory Jurist to the Asia Pacific Forum.

Shankar died on October 26, 2026, at the age of 94.

== Sources ==
- Asia Pacific Forum of National Human Rights Institution – Dato' Mahadev Shankar
- Two Tributes
- Interview with Mahadev Shankar
