= Sidek brothers =

Malaysian badminton players

Sidek
- Current region: Kuala Lumpur, Malaysia
- Origin: Banting, Selangor, Federated Malay States, British Malaya
- Members: see below

The Sidek family is a Malaysian family with a significant history within professional badminton. The patriarch of the family was an avid badminton fan, Sidek Abdullah Kamar (1936–2005), who himself was a former player turned senior coach. He started to train his sons from an early age at their hometown in Banting.

As soon as his sons were spotted by Khoo Teng Yuen, a BAM coach, he transferred them to a prestigious secondary school known as Victoria Institution in Kuala Lumpur, where he (Khoo) was based. The training ultimately culminated in regaining the Thomas Cup in 1992 after a lapse of 25 years.

The five Sidek brothers, who were also world-class players, began their run of success in the early 1980s. They won titles and medals in major tournaments, including All-England, World Cup, Olympic Games, and many big open tournaments. In 1985, the Sidek family made history when they became the largest sibling group ever to represent the country abroad in the same sporting event. Misbun, Razif, Jalani, Rahman, and Rashid were all selected to compete at the Hong Kong Open. They are also known as the founder of the infamous “S” serve, which caused a deceptively erratic shuttle movement, which confounded their opponents and officials alike. The serve caused much uproar and was eventually banned by the International Badminton Federation (IBF).

The Sidek family members remaining professionally active in badminton are Misbun's son, Misbun Ramdan Misbun, and Razif's son, Fazriq Razif.

== Members ==
- Mohmed Misbun (born 17 February 1960)
- Mohamad Razif (born 29 May 1962)
- Mohd Jalani (born 11 November 1964)
- Abdul Rahman (born 19 September 1966)
- Abdul Rashid (born 9 July 1968)

== Major achievements ==
Misbun:

- World Cup runner-up (1982)
- All-England runner-up (1986)
- Thomas Cup runner-up (1988)

Razif and Jalani:

- All-England champion (1982)
- World Grand Prix Finals gold medallist (1986, 1988, 1989, 1991)
- World Championships silver medallist (1987)
- World Cup gold medalist (1990, 1991)
- Thomas Cup champions (1992)
- Olympic Games bronze medallist (1992)
- Asian Championships gold medallist (1992)

Rahman:

- Thomas Cup champions (1992)
- Asian Championships bronze medallist (1992)

Rashid:

- Asian Championships gold medallist (1991, 1992)
- Thomas Cup champions (1992)
- World Grand Prix Finals gold medallist (1992)
- Olympic Games bronze medallist (1996)
- All-England runner-up (1996)

== In popular culture ==
Sidek and his sons' life story was published in a biographical comic book series, entitled Anak-Anak Sidek (The Sidek Brothers), which was published by Penerbitan JAS Sdn. Bhd., a company owned by Jalani's former wife, Raja Azmi. The comic series, touted as the Malaysia's first biographical comic, was later adapted into an animated series of the same title which aired on RTM for 3 seasons. All of the Sidek brothers, with the exception of Razif, became the board of directors and executive producers for both comic and the animated series.

From November 2023 to April 2024, a retrospective exhibition entitled Pameran Anak-Anak Sidek is being held at the Sultan Alam Shah Museum in Shah Alam, Selangor. In the museum, the brothers’ memorabilia, customized stamps, medals, trophies and many more are displayed to the public for the first time.
