= Yusli bin Mohamed Yusoff =

Malaysian corporate executive (1958–2022)

Dato' Yusli bin Mohamed Yusoff
- Born: 1958
- Died: March 10, 2022 (aged 63–64); Malaysia
- Education: Victoria Institution
- Alma mater: University of Essex (BSc Economics)
- Occupation: Business executive
- Known for: Chief Executive Officer of Bursa Malaysia (2004–2011)

Dato' Yusli bin Mohamed Yusoff (1958 – 10 March 2022) was a Malaysian business executive who was Chief Executive Officer and Executive Director of Bursa Malaysia from April 2004 to March 2011. He was associated with the modernisation and development of Malaysia’s capital market during the mid-2000s.

== Early life and education ==
Yusli received his secondary education at Victoria Institution in Kuala Lumpur. He later pursued Economics at the University of Essex in the United Kingdom, graduating with a Bachelor of Science degree.

== Career ==
=== Early career ===
Yusli began his career in 1981 with Peat Marwick Mitchell & Company in London. Upon returning to Malaysia, he held senior roles in the financial services industry, including as Chief Executive Officer of CIMB Securities Sdn Bhd from 2000 to 2004. He was also Chairman of the Association of Stockbroking Companies Malaysia between 2003 and 2004.

=== Bursa Malaysia ===
In April 2004, Yusli was appointed Chief Executive Officer and Executive Director of Bursa Malaysia. During his tenure, the exchange implemented initiatives aimed at strengthening governance standards, enhancing transparency and modernising its trading infrastructure. He stepped down from the role in March 2011.

=== Other roles ===
Following his tenure at Bursa Malaysia, Yusli was on the boards of several Malaysian public-listed companies, including YTL Power International Berhad, Mulpha International Berhad, Mudajaya Group Berhad and Westports Holdings Berhad. He also was Patron of the Victoria Institution Old Boys Association.

== Death ==
Yusli died on 10 March 2022 at the age of 63. He was remembered within Malaysia’s business community for his contributions to the country’s capital market development.
