= Ronald McCoy =

Malaysian obstetrician and peace activist (1930–2026)

- Born: 5 May 1930; Seremban, Negeri Sembilan, Federated Malay States, British Malaya
- Died: 1 September 2026 (aged 96)
- Occupations: Obstetrician; peace activist
- Known for: Proposing and helping initiate the International Campaign to Abolish Nuclear Weapons (ICAN)

Ronald McCoy (5 May 1930 – 1 September 2026) was a Malaysian obstetrician and peace activist. He was best known for proposing and helping initiate the idea for the International Campaign to Abolish Nuclear Weapons (ICAN), a global coalition of civil society organisations that was awarded the Nobel Peace Prize in 2017 for its work to promote the elimination of nuclear weapons through a treaty-based approach.

== Early life and education ==
Ronald McCoy was born in Seremban, Negeri Sembilan on 5 May 1930, during the period of British Malaya. He received his secondary education at the Victoria Institution in Kuala Lumpur. He experienced the Japanese occupation of Malaya as a child, and described how later accounts of the atomic bombings of Hiroshima and Nagasaki influenced his opposition to nuclear weapons.

McCoy trained as a medical doctor and later specialised in obstetrics, practising medicine for several decades before retiring from clinical work in the 1990s.

== Medical career and anti-nuclear activism ==
Following his medical training, McCoy became increasingly involved in international medical advocacy on issues of war and public health. He joined the International Physicians for the Prevention of Nuclear War (IPPNW), an organisation founded by physicians who argued that nuclear war would constitute a medical and humanitarian catastrophe beyond the capacity of any health system to manage.

McCoy later helped establish and lead the Malaysian affiliate of IPPNW, working to raise awareness of the humanitarian and medical consequences of nuclear weapons use within Southeast Asia.

== Origins of the International Campaign to Abolish Nuclear Weapons ==
In 2005, following the failure of the Nuclear Non-Proliferation Treaty (NPT) Review Conference, McCoy proposed the idea of launching a new international civil society campaign focused explicitly on the total abolition of nuclear weapons. He suggested a strategy inspired by the International Campaign to Ban Landmines, which had successfully advanced a treaty banning anti-personnel landmines.

In communications circulated among IPPNW colleagues, McCoy proposed the name “International Campaign to Abolish Nuclear Weapons” and its acronym “ICAN”. According to later accounts, his proposal emphasised the need for “lateral thinking” and a humanitarian framing of nuclear disarmament, rather than traditional state-centric arms control approaches.

ICAN was subsequently endorsed within IPPNW and formally launched in 2007, with its international coordination later based in Australia. Over time, the campaign grew into a coalition of hundreds of non-governmental organisations across more than 100 countries.

== Personal views ==
McCoy consistently framed his opposition to nuclear weapons in medical and humanitarian terms. He argued that nuclear war represents a form of mass destruction for which there can be no meaningful medical response, and that prevention through abolition is therefore the only ethical option.

== Death ==
On 1 September 2026, it was announced that McCoy had died at the age of 96.
