= Abdul Latif Ahmad =

Malaysian soldier

Abdul Latif Ahmad (born March 8, 1942) is a retired soldier from Malaysia. He was the commander of the Malaysian Battalion (Malbatt 1 ), which served under the United Nations (UN) peacekeeping force in Somalia in 1993. He led Malaysian troops at the Battle of Mogadishu, also known as the Black Hawk Down Incident. The operation on Oct 3 and 4, 1993, involved a rescue mission carried out by 113 Malbatt members to save United States Rangers pinned down by Somali militants in Bakaara, Mogadishu.

Aside from this, he saw action in the Confrontation between Indonesia and Malaysia (1964–1966); the May 13, 1969 racial rioting and its aftermath; the 1971 Kuala Lumpur floods and the fight against the Communist Party of Malaya in the 1970s.

In 2015, he authored Aku Masih Ingat… Memoir Seorang Komander (I still remember... Memoirs of a Commander) detailing the critical engagements he took part in.

== Early life ==
Abdul Latif was born in Kampung Baru, Kuala Lumpur, as the second son of medical assistant Ahmad and telephonist Zainon, but he lost his father when he was just two. He did his secondary schooling in Victoria Institution before moving on to the Federation Military College, which is now known as the Royal Military College.

Inspired by the exploits of Malayan soldiers in the UN Peacekeeping Force in the Congo, he was commissioned as a second lieutenant in December 1963, and was posted to the 4th Battalion Royal Malay Regiment in January 1964.

He led a platoon in armed combat against Indonesian forces at the village of Pelaman Mapu in Sarawak's First Division, and was also involved in the pursuit of enemy combatants after a school was burned down in a village called Tepoi. Later in Johor, he led the capture of three Indonesian infiltrators in the Pontian/Pekan Nenas area. The confrontation ended after a power shift in Indonesia when its president Sukarno was supplanted by General Suharto.

In October 1966, as a peace overture, Malaysia was invited to send a delegation for the Indonesian Armed Forces Day and Abdul Latif was in the group headed by Mindef secretary-general, the late Tan Sri Abdul Kadir Shamsuddin and the late General Tun Ibrahim Ismail.

== May 1969 riots ==
Following the general elections in May 1969, racial riots broke out at a time when Abdul Latif had attained the rank of captain and was serving as adjutant of the 5th battalion of Royal Malay Regiment, based at Sungai Besi.

His battalion was responsible for public order duties in the greater KL area for situations when the police were unable to cope. Following the outbreak of violence on May 13, he set off to the police CCC (Contingent Control Centre) High Street, based on Jalan Bandar.

He encountered crowds of people standing with sharpened iron rods on the side of the road, but was not attacked due to being in a military jeep convoy. A Public Order Prevention Ordinance (POPO) was called under which police powers were handed to the military.

Abdul Latif recalled many cars burning, and he had to send units to Chow Kit, Kampung Baru and Dato Keramat where the violence was at its peak. The military played a key role in containing the outbreak of violence and ensuring that it did not spread nationwide.

His units had to operate patrols and roadblocks, restore water and electricity and deliver food rations, and it took two weeks for the situation to calm down. Abdul Latif's superior General Ibrahim was appointed CEO of the National Operations Council, the emergency administrative body which attempted to restore law and order and govern the country in place of the elected government. On Feb 20, 1971, the NOC was dissolved with the restoration of Parliament.

== Mid career ==
Around the end of the NOC's term, the great flood of Kuala Lumpur struck after rain fell from Christmas Day 1970 to New Year's Day 1971. Abdul Latif was in charge of operations at Kampung Baru, coordinating relief efforts between the Air Force and the military.

In the late 1970s he was called into action due to the re-emergence of Communist Party of Malaya terrorist activity in the northern areas of Kedah and Perak. In 1978, he took command of the First Ranger Battalion, a multi-racial group that had the highest number of kills of Communist terrorists. He conducted operations in Semanggang (now Sri Aman), Lubok Antu and Sibu, Sarawak and also in Raub, Pahang in 1979. From 1984 to 1986 he was Malaysian Defence Advisor in Singapore.

== Somalia operations ==
In 1993, Abdul Latif saw action as the Commander of Malbatt 1 battalion, which served under the United Nations (UN) peace-keeping force in Somalia.

During this time, a rescue mission of US rangers was carried out by 113 members of the Malaysian battalion in Mogadishu, Somalia on Oct 3 and 4, 1993.

Abdul Latif has twice been vocal about his objections to cinematic portrayals of the events.

On the first occasion, he spoke up after a Hollywood film called Black Hawk Down was made by Ridley Scott in 2001. But did not tell about the participation of Malaysian soldiers in the rescue mission.

More recently there was Malbatt:Misi Bakara, a Malaysian-produced movie which purported to be 90 percent factual, but Abdul Latif and his deputy Major General (Rtd) Mohd Rozi Baharom objected to a number of erroneous and embarrassing scenes.
