= Abdul Majid bin Ismail =

Malaysian orthopaedic surgeon and health administrator (1921–2013)

Tan Sri Dato' Seri Abdul Majid bin Ismail
- Born: 15 November 1921; Kampung Baru, Kuala Lumpur, Federated Malay States
- Died: 24 March 2013 (aged 91); Kuala Lumpur, Malaysia
- Resting place: Royal Mausoleum, Shah Alam, Selangor
- Education: Victoria Institution; King Edward VII College of Medicine, Singapore; University of Malaya; Royal College of Surgeons of Edinburgh; University of Liverpool
- Occupations: Orthopaedic surgeon, public health administrator
- Known for: Director-General of Health of Malaysia (1971–1976); pioneer of orthopaedic surgery in Malaysia; founding president of the Malaysian Orthopaedic Association
- Spouse: Khairany Mahyuddin
- Children: 3

Abdul Majid bin Ismail (15 November 1921 – 24 March 2013), also known as A. M. Ismail and Coco Majid, was a Malaysian orthopaedic surgeon and public health administrator. He served as Malaysia's Director-General of Health from 1971 until his retirement in 1976, succeeding Mohamed Din bin Ahmad.

Abdul Majid was among the pioneers of modern orthopaedic surgery in Malaysia. He became one of the country's first locally qualified specialist orthopaedic surgeons and was instrumental in the development of orthopaedic services and professional surgical organisations. He was the founding president of the Malaysian Orthopaedic Association in 1967 and subsequently played a role in the establishment of regional orthopaedic organisations.

He also contributed to higher education, medical professional development and various public institutions in Malaysia.

== Early life and education ==
Abdul Majid was born on 15 November 1921 in Kampung Baru, Kuala Lumpur, then part of the Federated Malay States. He was the eldest of twelve children. His father, Ismail, worked as a machinist at the Central Railway Workshops in Sentul.

He received his early education at Segambut Malay School before attending Maxwell School and Batu Road School in Kuala Lumpur. In 1936, he entered Victoria Institution, where he remained until 1939. He completed the Senior Cambridge examination in 1939 and was recognised as one of the school's outstanding Malay students. His academic achievements enabled him to receive a Selangor State Scholarship in 1940 to study medicine at King Edward VII College of Medicine in Singapore.

Abdul Majid entered King Edward VII College of Medicine in 1940. His medical studies were interrupted by the Japanese occupation of Singapore during the Second World War.

During the occupation, medical education in Singapore was severely disrupted. The college came under Japanese administration, and some medical training continued at temporary locations, including facilities associated with Tan Tock Seng Hospital and Malacca General Hospital.

Following the war, Abdul Majid resumed his formal medical studies in 1946. In 1949, King Edward VII College of Medicine became part of the newly established University of Malaya in Singapore. Abdul Majid graduated with the Bachelor of Medicine and Bachelor of Surgery (MBBS) degree in 1950. During his student years, he acquired the nickname "Coco", which remained associated with him throughout his professional life. The nickname originated from a theatrical performance during his early years at medical college.

In 1953, Abdul Majid received a Queen's Scholarship to pursue postgraduate surgical training in the United Kingdom. He studied at the Royal College of Surgeons of Edinburgh and obtained the Fellowship of the Royal College of Surgeons (FRCS) qualification in 1955.

In 1957, he continued his postgraduate training at the University of Liverpool, specialising in orthopaedic surgery. He obtained the Master of Surgery in Orthopaedics (MChOrth) qualification that year. His postgraduate training included clinical experience associated with the Robert Jones and Agnes Hunt Orthopaedic Hospital in Oswestry, an established centre for orthopaedic training in Britain.

== Career ==
Abdul Majid began his medical career at Kuala Lumpur General Hospital, where he undertook his early clinical training. In 1951, he was appointed a Medical Officer in the Malayan Medical Service. He subsequently undertook postgraduate surgical training in the United Kingdom.

Following his return to Malaya, Abdul Majid served as State Surgeon in Negeri Sembilan in 1956.

After obtaining his postgraduate orthopaedic qualification from Liverpool in 1957, Abdul Majid returned to Malaya to help develop specialist orthopaedic services. In 1958, he was appointed Consultant Orthopaedic Surgeon for the Federation of Malaya. He subsequently assumed leadership of the orthopaedic unit at Kuala Lumpur General Hospital. According to the Malaysian Orthopaedic Association's history, Abdul Majid became the first local orthopaedic surgeon after completing his Liverpool qualification and took over leadership of the Kuala Lumpur General Hospital orthopaedic unit in 1959. His work also encompassed the development of facilities and training programmes associated with physiotherapy, orthopaedic nursing, prosthetics and rehabilitation.

In 1969, Abdul Majid was appointed Director of Planning and Research at the Ministry of Health, marking his transition from specialist clinical practice into senior national health administration.

In 1971, he succeeded Mohamed Din bin Ahmad as Malaysia's Director-General of Health. He held the position until his retirement from government service in 1976. As Director-General, Abdul Majid participated in the administration and development of Malaysia's public healthcare system during a period of expansion in health services and infrastructure. According to the National Archives of Malaysia, he represented the country at conferences organised by the World Health Organization, including meetings in Geneva in 1971 and Manila during the period from 1971 to 1976.

== Professional leadership ==
Abdul Majid was a founding member of the Malaysian Orthopaedic Association, established in 1967 to support the development of orthopaedic surgery in Malaysia. He became its first president and held the office until 1982.

Abdul Majid served as the founding president of the Association of Fellows of the Royal College of Surgeons of Edinburgh, established in 1970. The organisation was subsequently incorporated into the College of Surgeons of Malaysia in 1973, with Abdul Majid continuing as its founding president. The College established the A. M. Ismail Oration in his honour in 1973. The inaugural oration was delivered by surgeon Rodney Smith, who later became Baron Smith of Marlow.

Abdul Majid was also involved in the establishment of the ASEAN Orthopaedic Association. The association's first organisational meeting took place in Manila in 1981, bringing together orthopaedic surgeons from several Southeast Asian countries. Abdul Majid was among its founding members and was elected one of its founding vice-presidents.

== Contributions to higher education ==
Abdul Majid held several appointments involving Malaysian universities and professional institutions. He served as a member and later chairman of the University of Malaya Council, with his involvement in the council extending from 1959 until May 1987. He served as chairman of the University of Malaya Council from 1978 to 1987.

A retrospective article in the Malaysian Orthopaedic Journal describes his involvement in projects connected with Universiti Kebangsaan Malaysia, Universiti Sains Malaysia's medical facilities, and the establishment of private medical and educational institutions.

== Other appointments and public service ==
In 1963, Abdul Majid became the first Eisenhower Fellow from Malaya and spent several months in the United States under the fellowship programme.

Throughout his career and retirement, he held leadership positions in public, professional and charitable organisations. These included appointments associated with:

- The University of Malaya Council
- The College of Surgeons of Malaysia
- The Malaysian Orthopaedic Association
- The Malaysian Council for Rehabilitation
- The National Medical Research Council
- The Heart Foundation of Malaysia
- The National Council of Social Welfare
- The Sultan Abdul Aziz Foundation

He also participated in the development of private educational and healthcare institutions, including activities associated with Pantai Hospital and INTI College.

== Honours and awards ==
- 1965 – Pingat Pekerti Terpilih, Negeri Sembilan
- 1965 – Johan Mangku Negara (JMN)
- 1966 – Dato' Seri Maharaja Diraja Selangor
- 1972 – Dato' Seri Paduka Setia Mahkota, Kelantan
- 1973 – Panglima Setia Mahkota (PSM), carrying the title Tan Sri
- 1985 – Seri Sultan Salehuddin Abdul Aziz Shah, Selangor

== Personal life ==
Abdul Majid married Khairany Mahyuddin in 1951. The couple had three children, one son and two daughters. He maintained a lifelong interest in golf. Historical accounts describe how he worked as a golf caddie during his youth before becoming an accomplished amateur golfer. His childhood and professional experiences were documented in the memoir An Old Man Remembers, published in 2006 and written by his daughter Ellina based on his recollections.

== Death and legacy ==
Abdul Majid died on 24 March 2013 at his residence in Taman Duta, Kuala Lumpur. His burial was arranged at the Royal Mausoleum in Shah Alam, Selangor, in recognition of his previous service to the Selangor royal household. An obituary published in the Malaysian Orthopaedic Journal in 2014 documented his career and contributions to Malaysian surgery and medical administration.

A retrospective article published in the Malaysian Orthopaedic Journal described him as a pioneering figure in Malaysian orthopaedics and attributed to him a central role in developing the profession's early institutional foundations.

The A. M. Ismail Oration, established in 1973, continues to commemorate his contributions to the surgical profession.
