= Victoria Institution =

Victoria Institution (VI)
- Jalan Hang Tuah, 55200, Kuala Lumpur; Malaysia

Information
- Type: All-boys secondary school
- Motto: Be Yet Wiser - To be a scholar, sportsman and a gentleman
- Established: 14 August 1893; 133 years ago
- Principal: En Abd Samad bin Othman
- Grades: Forms 1 – 6
- Gender: Male; Co-educational (Form 6)
- Colours: Oxford Blue; Cambridge Blue
- Accreditation: Cluster School of Excellence
- Newspaper: The Seladang
- Yearbook: The Victorian
- Alumni: Victoria Institution Old Boys Association (VIOBA)
- Website: sites.google.com/moe-dl.edu.my/victoria-institution/

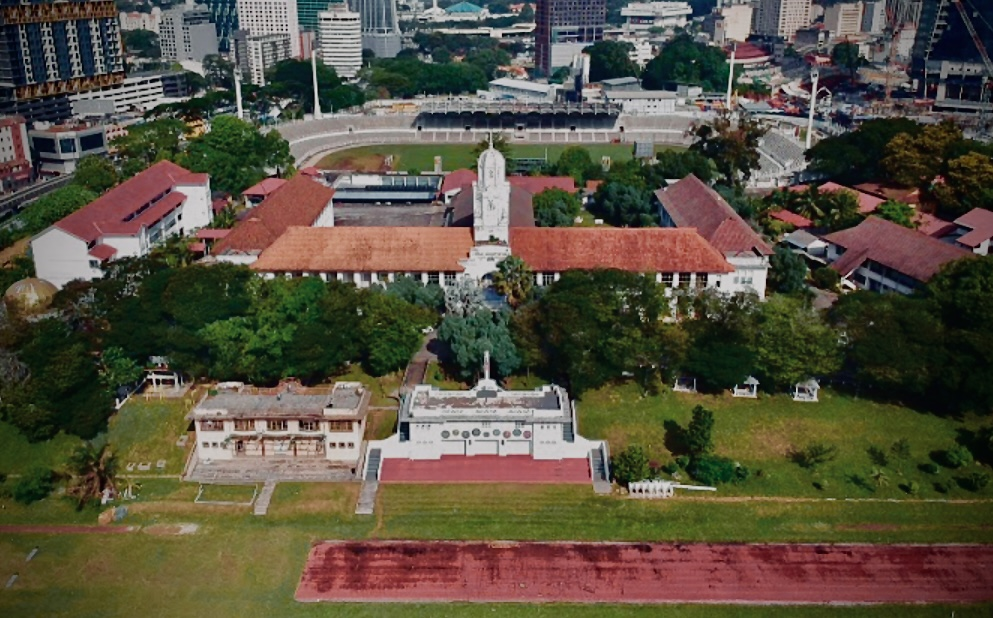

The Victoria Institution (commonly known as VI) is an all-boys secondary school in Kuala Lumpur, Malaysia. It is one of the earliest and most prominent secondary schools in the city and was established as a memorial school commemorating the Golden Jubilee of Queen Victoria in 1887.

VI is a secondary school for male students only from Form 1 to 5. Female students are accepted for Form 6 (Lower and Upper) and the students are known as Victorians.

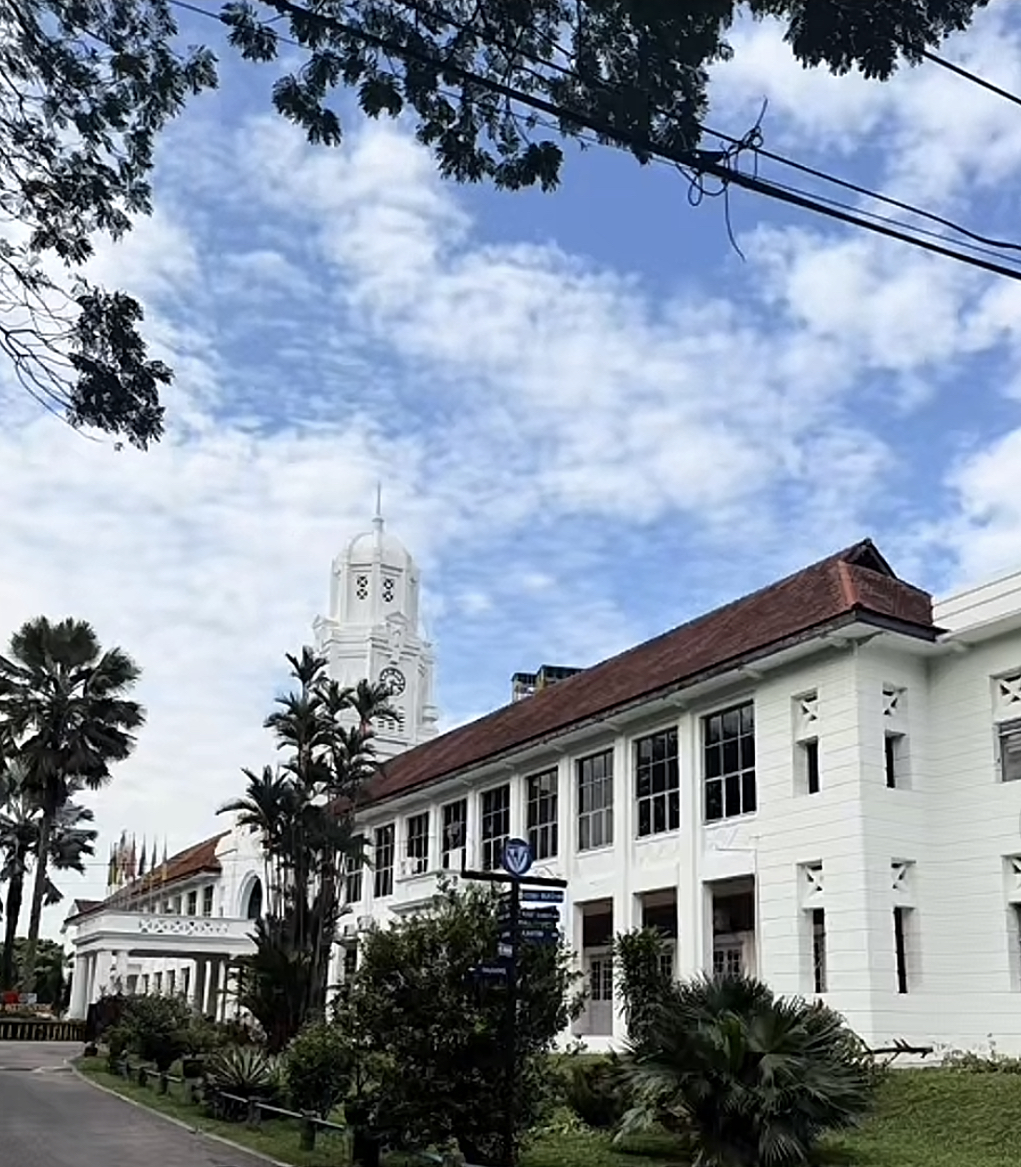
Victoria Institution in 2025

The old VI in 2018

== History ==
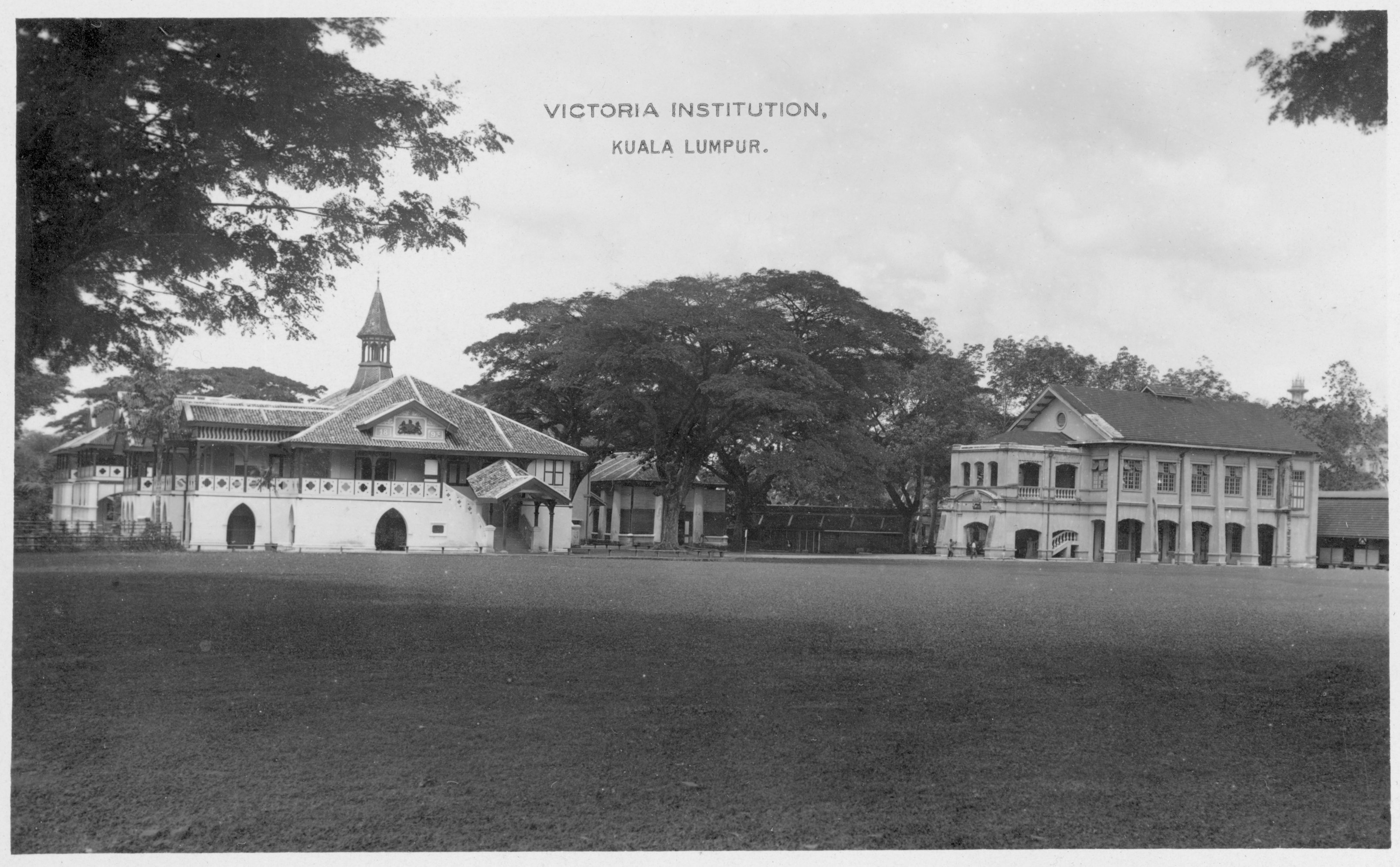
Victoria Institution in 1905

VI was founded following a public subscription initiative to commemorate the Golden Jubilee of Queen Victoria in 1887. The school was further supported by financial contributions from the Sultan and government of Selangor, as well as prominent residents of Kuala Lumpur.

The foundation stone was laid on 14 August 1893 by Lady Treacher, wife of the then Resident of Selangor, Sir William Hood Treacher. The school officially opened on 28 July 1894 at its original site along what is now Jalan Tun H.S. Lee.

Due to frequent flooding from the Klang River, the school relocated to Shaw Road (now Jalan Hang Tuah) on 26 March 1929.

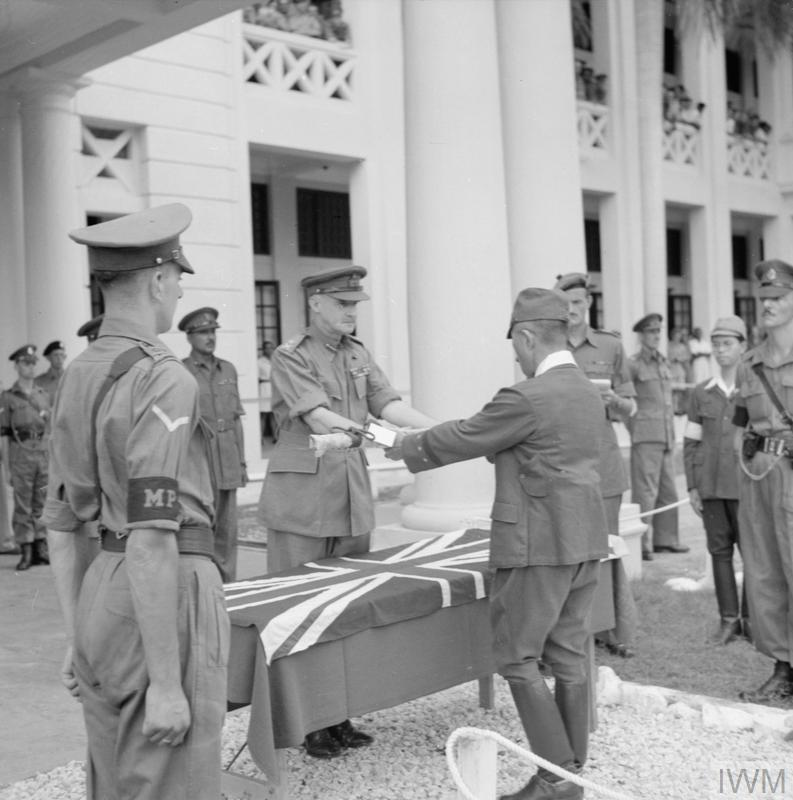
General Officer Commanding Malaya Command, Lieutenant General F W Messervy KBE, CB, DSO, receives the sword of General Itagaki, Commander of the Japanese 7 Area Army, which controlled Malaya, Java, Sumatra, Nicobar and Andaman Islands, parts of Borneo and Siam, at a formal ceremony of surrender held in the grounds of VI

On 13 September 1945, the Victoria Institution was the site of the formal surrender of the 29th Imperial Japanese Army to Lieutenant-General Ouvry Roberts of the British 34th Indian Corps.

The old building was then used for the premises of the Technical College up until the 1950s when the new Technical College building at Jalan Gurney (now Jalan Semarak) was completed and officially opened on the 1 March 1955 by Sir Donald MacGillivray, the British High Commissioner to Malaya.

It then housed High Street School before relocated to Setapak High School.

From the 1980s, the old premises were managed as a cultural centre known as Taman Budaya and later came under the administration of the National Department for Culture and Arts.

=== National heritage designation ===
On 14 February 2009, the Victoria Institution building at Jalan Hang Tuah was declared a National Heritage site by the Malaysian government. It was listed by the Department of National Heritage under the category of heritage buildings. On the same day, Unity, Culture, Arts and Heritage Minister Mohd Shafie Apdal announced that SMK Victoria would revert to its historic name, Victoria Institution, following its designation as a national heritage site.

=== Postage stamp ===
On 16 December 2008, Victoria Institution was featured in Pos Malaysia's Premier Schools postage-stamp issue. The issue consisted of four 50-sen stamps featuring SMK St. Thomas in Kuching, SMK Victoria (Victoria Institution) in Kuala Lumpur, SMK Convent Bukit Nanas in Kuala Lumpur, and SM All Saints in Kota Kinabalu. The Victoria Institution stamp bore the name "SMK Victoria (Victoria Institution), Kuala Lumpur" and the school's founding year, 1893.

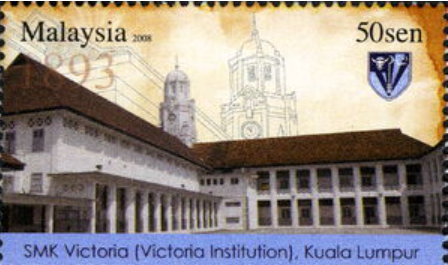
Pos Malaysia's Premier Schools postage-stamp

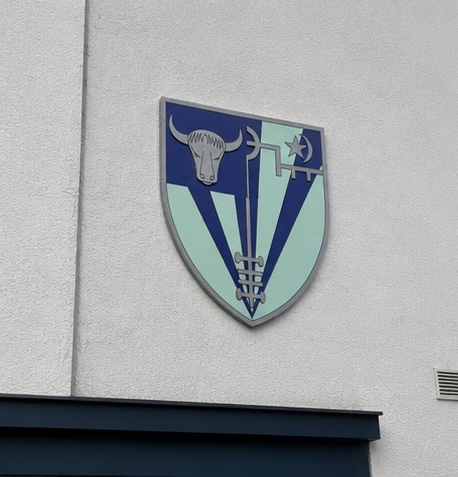
The Cambridge Blue colour as used in the original badge

== Campus ==
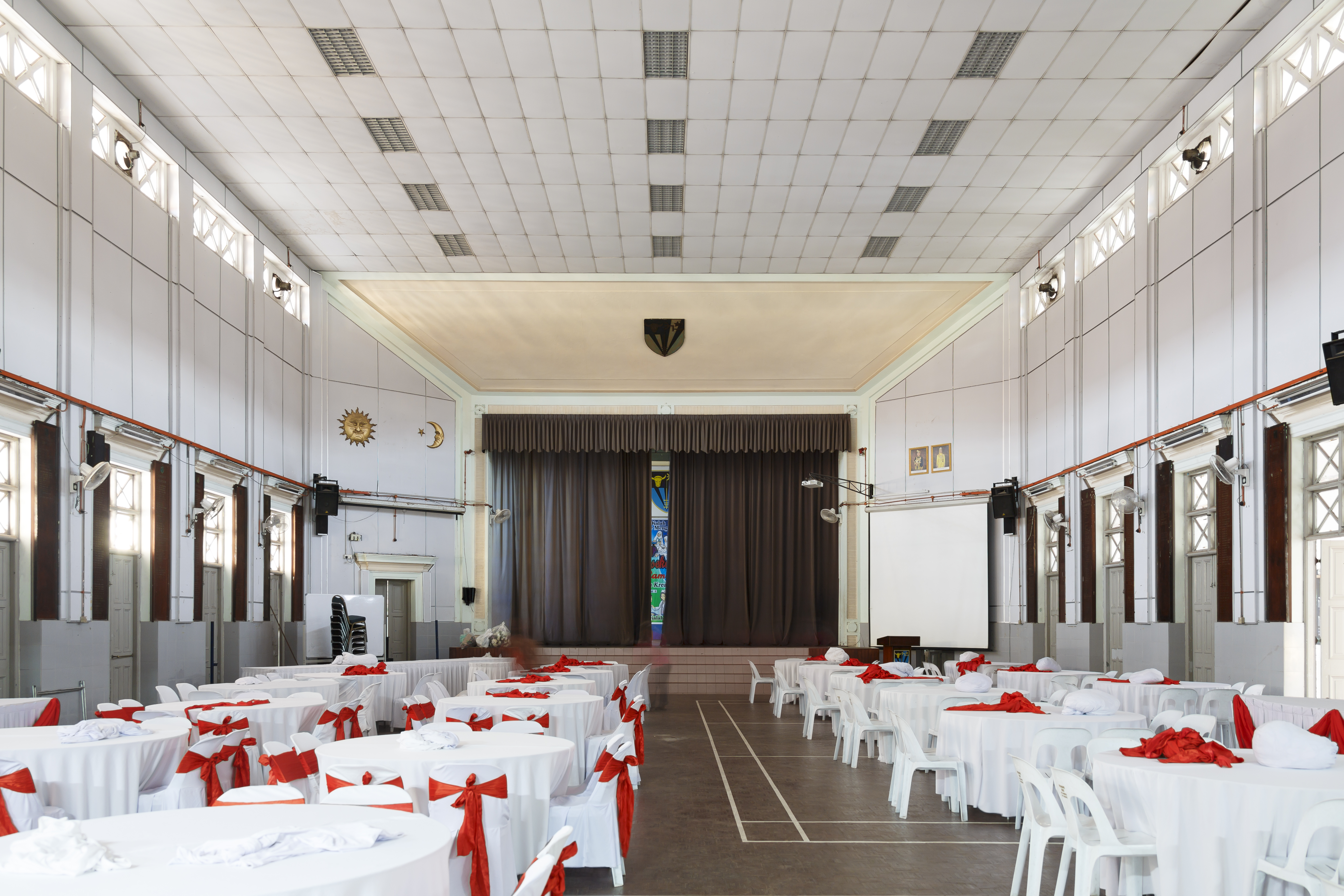
The Main Hall at E Block.

The school campus features a clock tower flanked by two sports pavilions overlooking a large central field. It also includes a 25-metre swimming pool and athletics facilities.

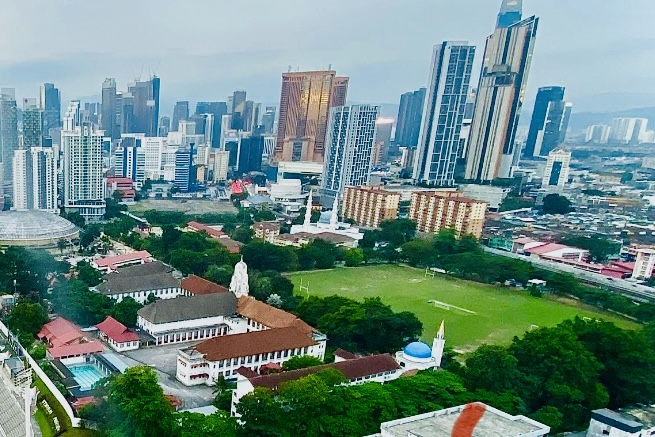
Aerial view of VI

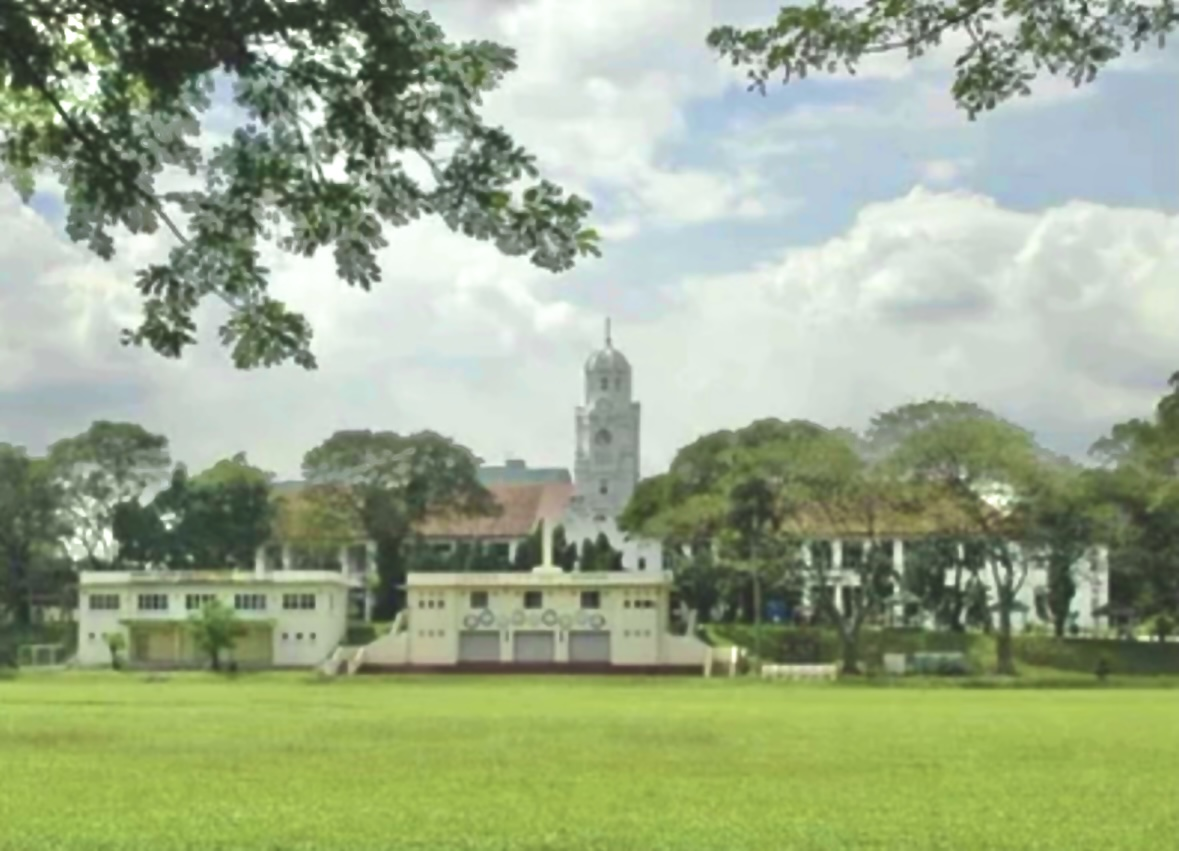
The main building with the two pavillions facing the field

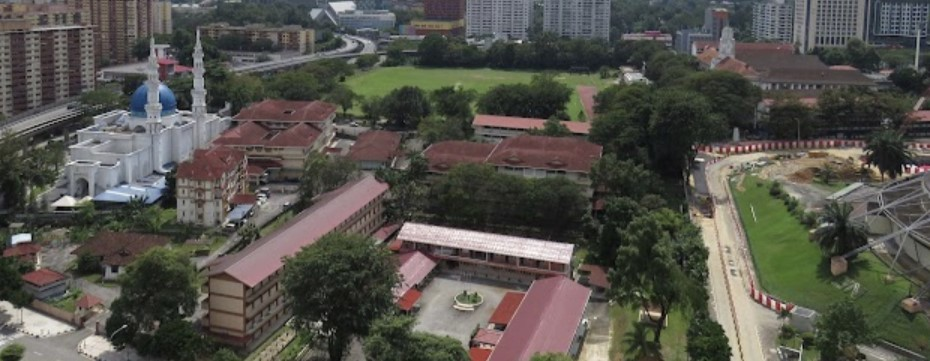
View from Jalan Hang Jebat

== Student leadership and traditions ==
=== Prefect system ===
Student leadership at Victoria Institution includes a prefect system that has historically played a role in school discipline and governance. An opinion column in Malay Mail described the school’s prefects’ board as among the earliest established in the region, highlighting its longstanding influence within the school community.

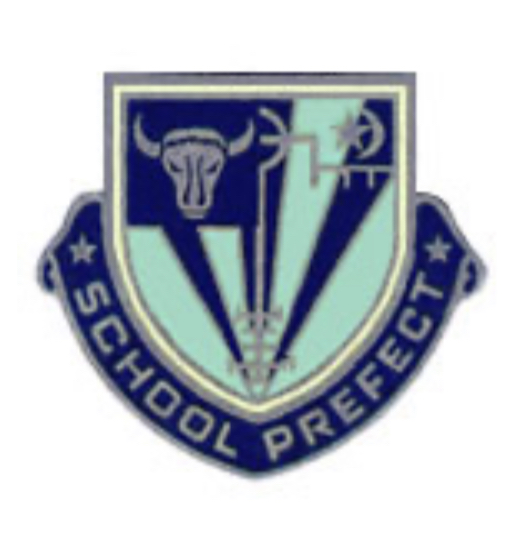

=== Co-curricular activities ===
Victoria Institution maintains a cadet corps as part of its co-curricular activities, and according to the school’s official background information, the unit was established in 1901 by the school’s first headmaster, En. Bennet Eyre Shaw

The Pasukan Kadet Bersatu Malaysia (PKBM), with which school cadet units are aligned nationally, was formally established under the Pasukan Kadet Bersatu Malaysia Act 1967 (Act 68).

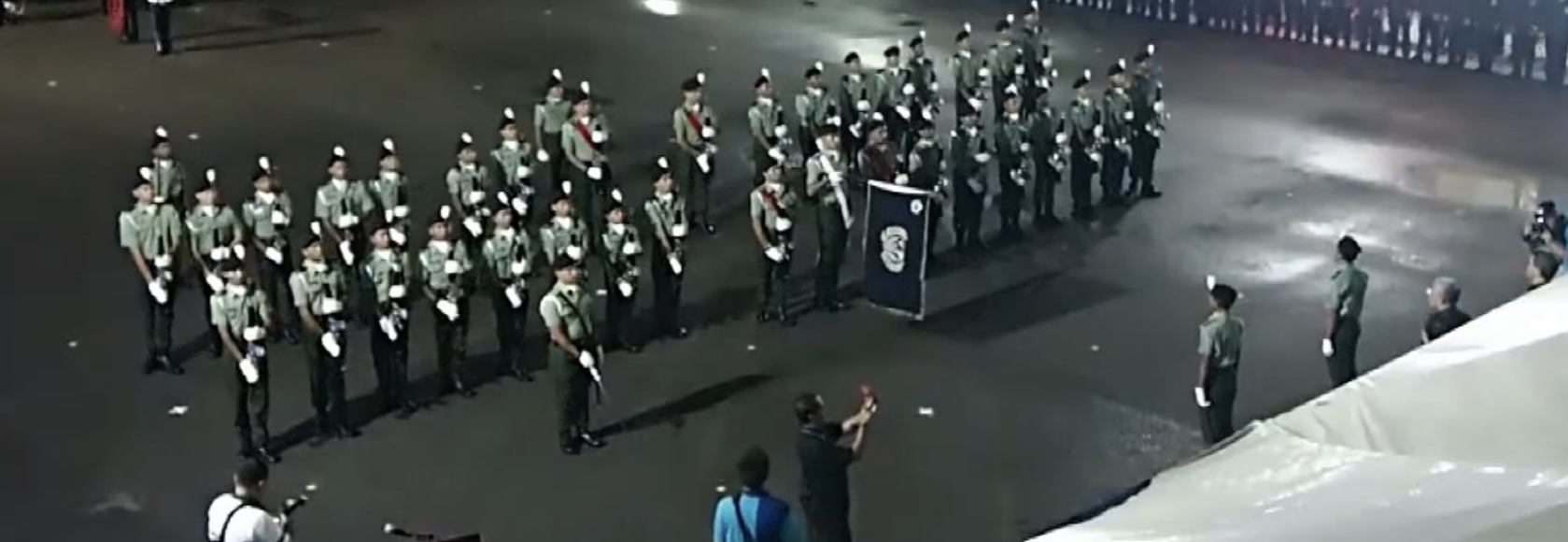
Victoria Institution Cadet Corps Infantry (V.I.C.C.I)

== Sports ==
=== Badminton ===
Victoria Institution has produced numerous prominent Malaysian badminton players, including the Sidek brothers and several members of Malaysia's 1992 Thomas Cup-winning team.

Notable badminton alumni include:

- Misbun Sidek – Former Malaysian national badminton champion and national singles coach.
- Razif Sidek – 1982 All England men's doubles champion and member of Malaysia's 1992 Thomas Cup-winning team.
- Jalani Sidek – 1982 All England men's doubles champion and member of Malaysia's 1992 Thomas Cup-winning team.
- Rahman Sidek – Former Malaysian international badminton player and member of the 1992 Thomas Cup-winning team.
- Rashid Sidek – 1996 Olympic men's singles bronze medallist and member of Malaysia's 1992 Thomas Cup-winning team.
- Foo Kok Keong – Former Malaysian national singles player and member of Malaysia's 1992 Thomas Cup-winning team.
- Soo Beng Kiang – Former Malaysian national doubles player and member of Malaysia's 1992 Thomas Cup-winning team.
- Wong Tat Meng – Former Malaysian international badminton player and national singles coach.

Victoria Institution's contribution to Malaysian badminton was particularly significant in 1992, when six of its former students were members of the national squad that won the Thomas Cup after a 25-year wait. They included Razif Sidek, Jalani Sidek, Rashid Sidek, Foo Kok Keong, Soo Beng Kiang and reserve player Wong Ewe Mun.

=== Rugby ===
Victoria Institution has a long-established rugby program and regularly competes in the Super Schools Rugby (SSR) championship, Malaysia’s premier inter-school rugby competition.

Victoria Institution has appeared in four finals of the Super Schools Rugby competition since making its tournament debut in 2017, winning the championship twice and finishing as runners-up twice.

Victoria Institution in Super Schools Rugby finals
Year	Opponent	Score (VI–opponent)	Result
2017	Malay College Kuala Kangsar	10–8	Champions
2023	SEMASHUR	21–7	Champions
2025	MRSM Balik Pulau	13–14	Runners-up
2026	SEMASHUR	33–37	Runners-up

The school also organises the annual Victoria Institution Premier 10s Rugby Tournament, which has been reported as a significant event in the Malaysian schools rugby calendar.

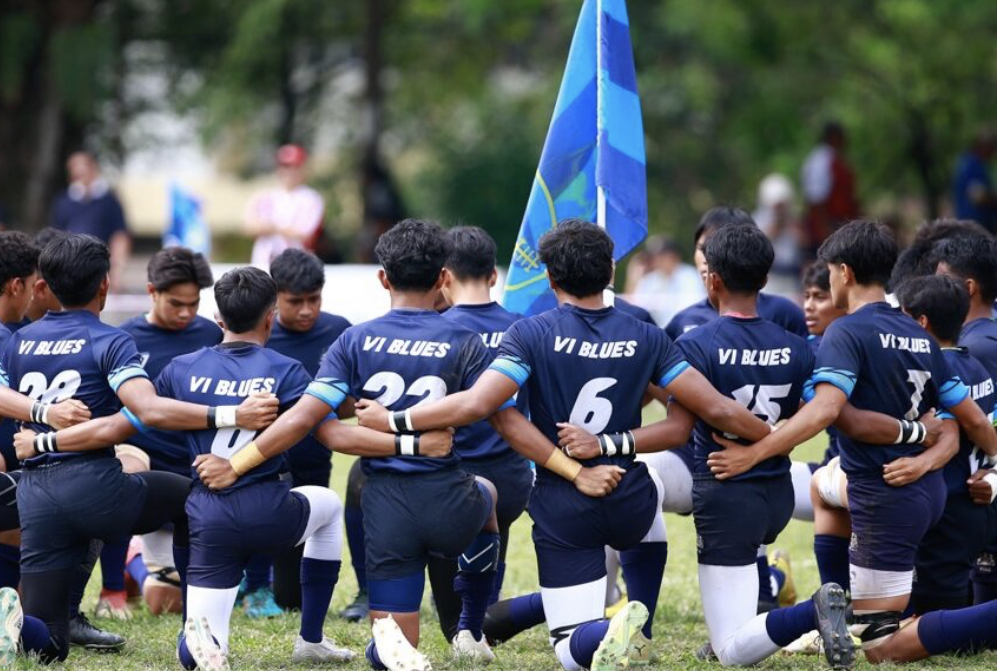

=== Football ===
The Victoria Institution football team has achieved success at state and national levels, winning the Manchester United Premier Cup Malaysia in 2009 and 2013 and representing Malaysia at regional competitions.

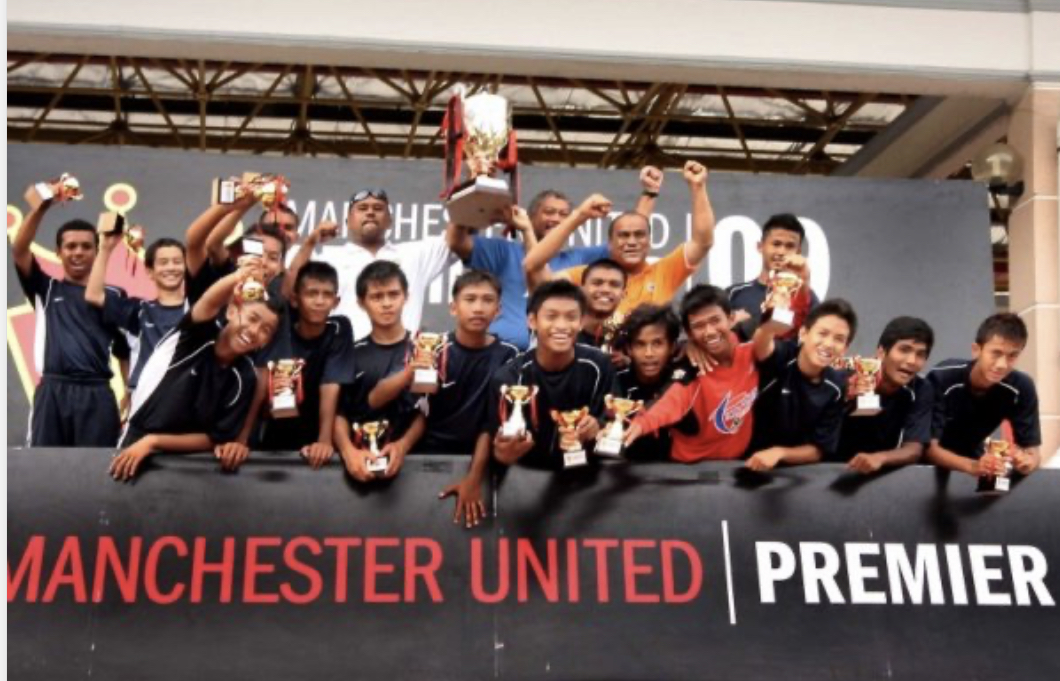

In 2026, Victoria Institution participated in the Liga Piala Remaja KPM-FAM Under-17 football competition, alongside teams such as Sekolah Sukan Bukit Jalil (SSBJ), Akademi Mokhtar Dahari (AMD), and SMK Taman Desa Skudai, which has represented the Johor Darul Ta'zim (JDT) Academy.

=== Cricket ===
Cricket has a long association with Victoria Institution. The school competes in cricket competitions organised by the Majlis Sukan Sekolah Wilayah Persekutuan Kuala Lumpur (MSSWPKL), the Kuala Lumpur Cricket Association and the Malaysian Cricket Association.

Victoria Institution won three consecutive MSSWPKL under-18 cricket championships from 2024 to 2026. The school won the 2024 final by eight wickets, retained the championship in 2025, and secured its third consecutive title in 2026.

The school also represented Kuala Lumpur in the 2024 National Champion Schools Cricket Championship for boys under 17. Victoria Institution finished third after winning the third-place playoff by 45 runs. The team scored 119/8 before dismissing its opponent for 74 runs.

Selected Victoria Institution cricket achievements
Year	Competition	Category	Achievement
2024	MSSWPKL Cricket Championship	Under-18	Champions
2024	National Champion Schools Cricket Championship	Boys under-17	Third place
2025	MSSWPKL Cricket Championship	Under-18	Champions
2026	MSSWPKL Cricket Championship	Under-18	Champions

In 2002, the Malay Cricket Association of Malaysia established one of its two national cricket development centres at Victoria Institution, with the other centre located at Penang Free School. Two full-time coaches from Sri Lanka were recruited to train primary- and secondary-school players at the centres.

On 10 April 2026, the Malaysian Cricket Association designated Victoria Institution as the tenth State Centre of Excellence under the National Cricket Development Programme. The centre was established through cooperation between the Malaysian Cricket Association, the Kuala Lumpur Cricket Association and Victoria Institution.

The Victoria Institution cricket ground has also hosted international competitions. It was used as a venue during the 1997 ICC Trophy. The ground subsequently hosted List A group-stage matches during the cricket tournament at the 1998 Commonwealth Games, including Pakistan against Scotland and Malaysia against Jamaica.

=== Swimming and water polo ===
Victoria Institution alumnus Sieh Kok Chi, who attended the school from 1952 to 1958, represented Malaya and Malaysia in water polo and won silver medals at the 1965, 1967 and 1969 SEAP Games. He later served as Honorary Secretary of the Olympic Council of Malaysia from 1992 to 2013 and as Secretary General from 2013 to 2015.

In swimming, Khiew Hoe Yean won seven gold medals and one silver medal at the 2019 ASEAN Schools Games while a Form Five student at VI. He later represented Malaysia in the men's 400-metre freestyle at the 2024 Summer Olympics.

Another swimmer who attended the school, Muhammad Dhuha Zulfikry, won six gold medals at the 2024 Malaysia Games and broke Malaysia's 35-year-old men's 1,500-metre short-course freestyle record that year.

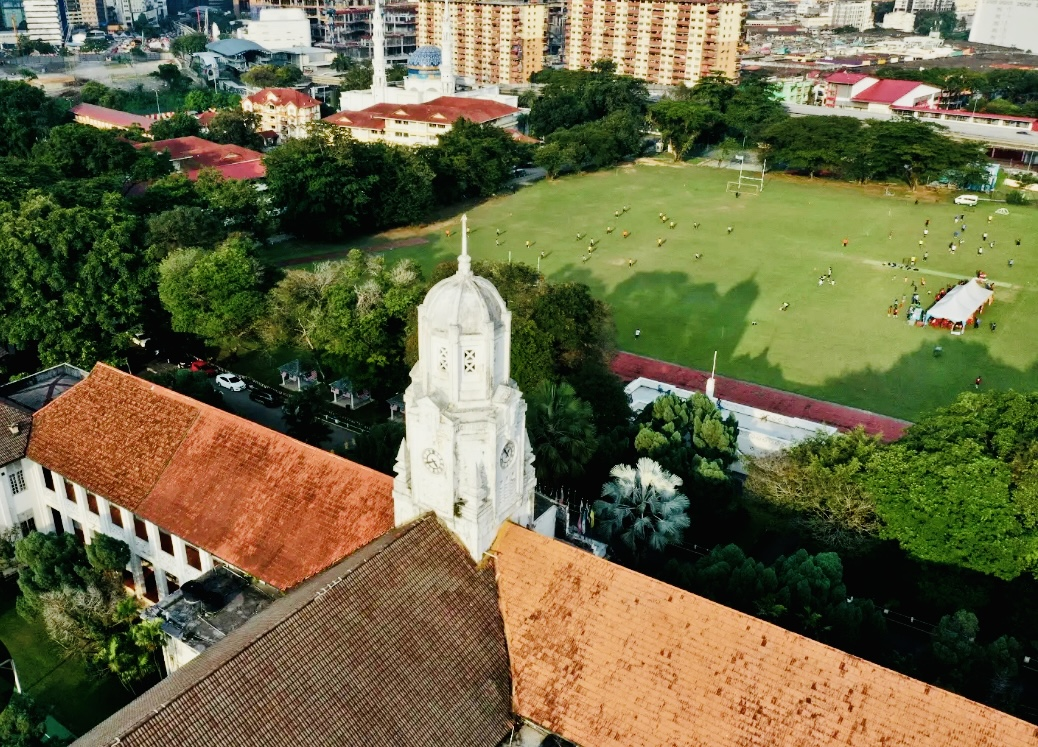
VI Green as the main ground for rugby, football and cricket

== Headmasters and Headmistresses ==
The following is a chronological list of headmasters and headmistresses of Victoria Institution.

No.	Name	Tenure	Notes
1	G. W. Hepponstall	1893	Acting
2	Bennett Eyre Shaw	1894–1922	
3	R. F. Stainer	1897	Acting
4	Rev. Knight-Clark	1900	Acting
5	J. H. Tyte	1905	Acting
6	William J. Proudlock	1910	Acting
7	C. G. Coleman	1914	Acting
8	M. Wheatley	Apr 1922–Feb 1923	Acting
9	Richard J. H. Sidney	Feb 1923–Feb 1926	
10	G. C. Davies	Feb 1926–Jun 1930	
11	R. F. Gunn	Jun 1929–Aug 1929	Acting
12	Frederick L. Shaw	Aug 1929–Mar 1930	Acting
13	Edgar de la Mothe Stowell	Jun 1930–Dec 1930	Acting
14	Frederick L. Shaw	Jan 1931–Jul 1936	
15	H. R. Carey	Feb 1934–Nov 1934	Acting
16	J. B. Neilson	Jul 1936–Jun 1937	
17	C. E. Gates	Jun 1937–Jan 1942	
18	E. H. Wilson	Nov 1939–Aug 1940	Acting
19	M. Vallipuram	Feb 1946–Sep 1946	Acting
20	Ng Seo Buck	Oct 1946	Acting
21	Frederick Daniel	Oct 1946–May 1949	
22	E. M. F. Payne	May 1949–May 1952	
23	A. H. Hill	Jul 1951–Dec 1951	Acting
24	A. Godman	May 1952–Jul 1952	Acting
25	J. N. Davis	Jul 1952–Apr 1953	
26	G. P. Dartford	1953–1955	
27	A. Atkinson	May 1954–Dec 1954	Acting
28	Peter Roberts	May 1955–Dec 1955	
29	Gerwyn E. D. Lewis	1956–1962	
30	A. G. Young	Apr 1958–Aug 1958	Acting
31	Lim Eng Thye	Feb 1961–Aug 1961	Acting
32	Alan D. Baker	1962–1964	
33	V. Murugasu	1964–1969	
34	Tan Cheng Or	1970–1971	
35	V. Somasundram	1971–1973	
36	Victor Gopal	1973–1976	
37	Abdul Rahim bin Che Teh	1976–1978	
38	Baharum bin Othman	1978–1979	
39	Abdul Shukor bin Haji Abdullah	1979–1982	
40	Abdul Rahim bin Abdul Majid	1982–1988	
41	Shuib bin Dahaban	1988–1992	
42	Robeahtun Haji Ahmad Damanhuri	1992–1995	
43	Othman bin Husin	1996	
44	Salha Othman	1996–1998	
45	Baharom Kamari	1999–2001	
46	Taslim Sarbini	2002–2003	
47	Muhamad Khailani Abdul Jalil	2004–2007	
48	Azizah binti Othman	2008–2009	
49	Maslan bin Buniran	2010–2016	
50	Kamarul Azman bin Md Arif	2016–2020	
51	Nur Elisa Tee Lee Hwa	2021–2023	
52	Abdul Samad bin Othman	2023–	Incumbent

== Alumni ==
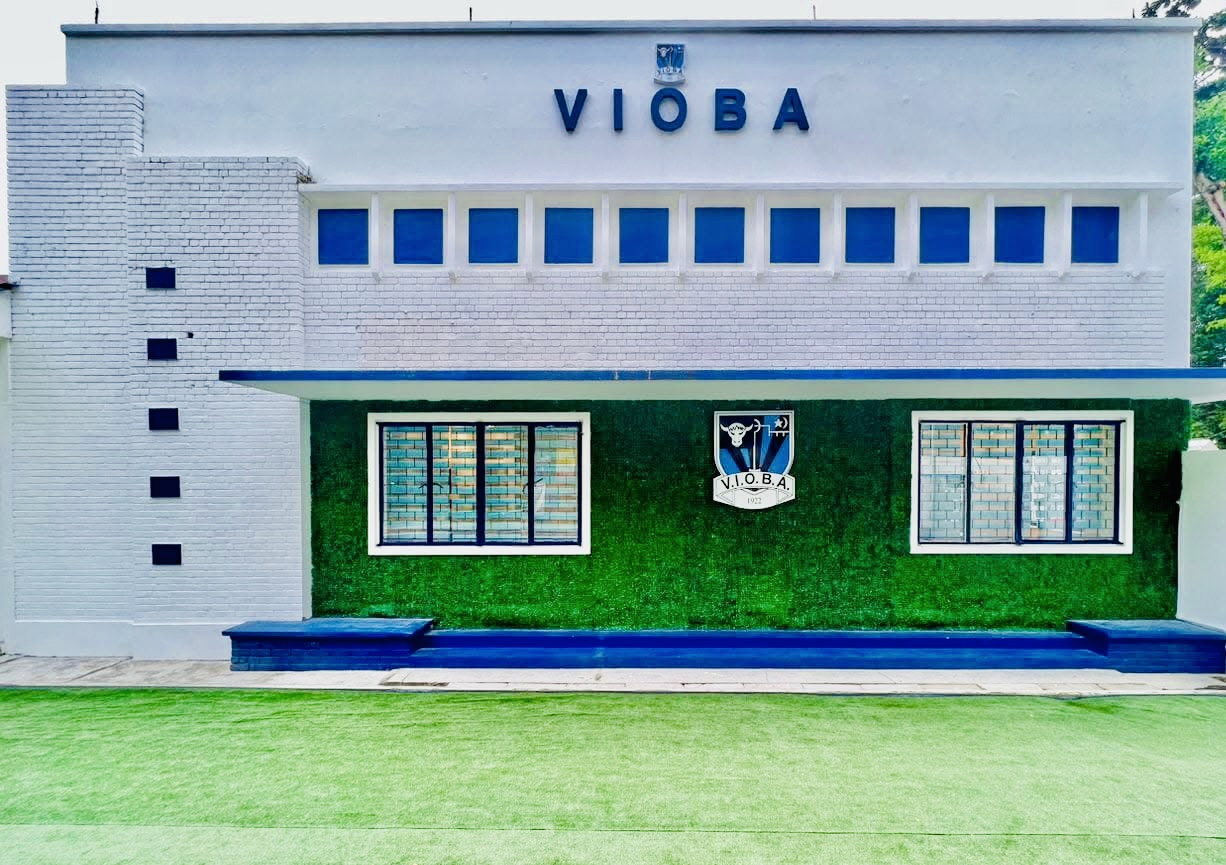
Victoria Institution Old Boys' Association, the school's alumni

The school's alumni organisation, the Victoria Institution Old Boys' Association (VIOBA), was founded in 1922 and remains active in Malaysia and abroad.

=== Notable alumni ===
Royalty

- Hassanal Bolkiah – Sultan of Brunei; attended Victoria Institution in Kuala Lumpur from 1961 to 1963.

Politician

- Prabowo Subianto – 8th President of Indonesia; attended Victoria Institution in Kuala Lumpur from 1962 to 1964.
- S. Rajaratnam – Deputy Prime Minister of Singapore.
- Rafidah Aziz – Malaysian politician and former Minister of International Trade and Industry.
- Harun Idris – Malaysian politician; former Menteri Besar of Selangor.
- Shafie Apdal – Malaysian politician and former Chief Minister of Sabah.
- Yaacob Abdul Latiff – Former Mayor of Kuala Lumpur (1972–1983) and Malaysian politician.
- Zulhasnan Rafique – Malaysian politician; Minister of Federal Territories (2006–2008).

Military

- Mohamed Hashim Mohd Ali – Malaysian military officer; 9th Chief of the Malaysian Armed Forces.
- Abdul Latif Ahmad – Malaysian military officer, retired brigadier general who served during Confrontation, Communist insurgency and led special forces in Somalia.
- K. Thanabalasingam – Malaysian naval officer who served as the first Malaysian Chief of the Royal Malaysian Navy from 1967 to 1976.

Banking

- Ismail Mohamed Ali – second Governor of the Central Bank of Malaysia and Chairman of Permodalan Nasional Berhad.

Business

- Ananda Krishnan – Malaysian entrepreneur and business magnate.
- Francis Yeoh – Malaysian businessman (YTL Corporation).
- Yusli bin Mohamed Yusoff – Former Chief Executive Officer of Bursa Malaysia.

Diplomacy

- Ramanathan Vengadesan – former Malaysian ambassador to Italy who served 35 years as a career diplomat.

Economics

- Ramon Navaratnam – Economist and civil servant.

Law and judiciary

- Anuar Zainal Abidin – Malaysian jurist and former Chief Judge of Malaya; served in the Malaysian judiciary for over 30 years before retiring as Chief Judge in 1997.
- Gunn Chit Tuan – Malaysian jurist and former Chief Justice of the High Court in Malaya
- Gopal Sri Ram – Malaysian lawyer and former Federal Court judge
- Mahadev Shankar – Malaysian lawyer and former Court of Appeal judge.
- Yong Pung How – Singaporean jurist and former Chief Justice of Singapore
- Tommy Thomas – Malaysian lawyer and former Attorney General of Malaysia (2018–2020)
- Mohd Zaman Khan – Malaysian police officer and former Commissioner General of the Malaysian Prisons Department

Sports

- Mani Jegathesan – Malaysian athlete, sports administrator, and medical doctor
- Mokhtar Dahari – Malaysian footballer.
- Lall Singh – Malaysian-born cricketer who represented India in its inaugural Test match in 1932.
- Misbun Sidek – Malaysian badminton coach and former player.
- Razif Sidek – Malaysian badminton player.
- Jalani Sidek – Malaysian badminton player.
- Rashid Sidek – Malaysian badminton player.
- Foo Kok Keong – Former Malaysian national badminton player, world No. 1 in 1991, and member of Malaysia's 1992 Thomas Cup-winning team.

Medicine

- Abdul Latiff bin Abdul Razak (1889–1956) – Physician.
- Mohamed Din bin Ahmad (1912–1999) – Malaysian physician and public health administrator; Malaysia's first Director-General of Health (1967–1971) and founding Master of the Academy of Medicine of Malaysia.
- Abdul Majid bin Ismail (1921–2013) – Malaysian orthopaedic surgeon and Director-General of Health of Malaysia (1971–1976); founding president of the Malaysian Orthopaedic Association
- Ronald McCoy – Obstetrician and peace activist.

Arts

- Amir Muhammad – Malaysian filmmaker and writer.
- Aziz Mirzan Murad (Jit Murad) – Actor and writer.
