= Misbun Sidek =

Malaysian badminton player (born 1960)

Personal information
- Nickname: Bun
- Born: Mohmed Misbun bin Mohd Sidek; 17 February 1960 (age 66) Banting, Selangor, Federation of Malaya
- Years active: 1978–1990
- Height: 1.77 m (5 ft 10 in)

Sport
- Country: Malaysia
- Sport: Badminton
- Handedness: Right

Men's singles
- Highest ranking: 2 (1983)
- BWF profile
Medal record
Representing Malaysia
Men's badminton
World Championships
Bronze medal – third place	1980 Jakarta	Men's doubles
World Cup
Silver medal – second place	1982 Kuala Lumpur	Men's singles
Bronze medal – third place	1983 Kuala Lumpur	Men's singles
Bronze medal – third place	1985 Jakarta	Men's singles
Thomas Cup
Silver medal – second place	1988 Kuala Lumpur	Team
Bronze medal – third place	1986 Jakarta	Team
Southeast Asian Games
Silver medal – second place	1979 Jakarta	Men's team
Silver medal – second place	1981 Manila	Men's team
Silver medal – second place	1987 Jakarta	Men's team
Bronze medal – third place	1979 Jakarta	Men's doubles
Bronze medal – third place	1981 Manila	Men's singles
Bronze medal – third place	1987 Jakarta	Men's singles
Asian Championships
Silver medal – second place	1985 Kuala Lumpur	Men's team
Bronze medal – third place	1985 Kuala Lumpur	Men's singles

Mohmed Misbun Mohd Sidek (born 17 February 1960) is a former Malaysian badminton player. He is the eldest of the famous five Sidek brothers.

== Early life ==
Misbun received his early education in local primary schools which were located in his hometown of Banting and later furthered his studies at Victoria Institution, Kuala Lumpur.

Mohd Sidek, his father, had a vision to see his children become badminton aces by training his eldest son, Misbun from an early age. By the age of seven in 1967, Misbun had begun to be seriously trained by his father at the badminton court in front of their house in Kampung Kanchong Darat, Banting, Selangor.

The same routine was later passed on to his brothers, the Sidek family which consisted of his popular brothers namely himself, Razif, Jalani, Rahman and Rashid. They were once the pride of Malaysia's badminton from the early 1980s to the early 2000s. and also he is badminton player.

== Career ==
Misbun won his first title on the international circuit at the 1981 German Open. He helped Malaysia's national squad win the Silver medal at the SEA Games. In the team event, he beat Indonesia's leading player and reigning All England champion Liem Swie King. For his triumphs in badminton, Misbun was named Malaysia's Sportsman of the Year, a feat he repeated two years later.

After defeating Morten Frost and Prakash Padukone on his way to the final, Misbun suffered a disappointment at the 1982 Badminton World Cup by failing to clinch the title from a 10–1 third-set lead over Liem Swie King. He also known for the infamous "S" Service, which caused a deceptively erratic shuttle movement, which confounded their opponents and officials alike. The service caused much uproar and was eventually banned by the International Badminton Federation (IBF) in 1982.

In October 1983, Misbun turned professional and signed a contract to be represented by the International Management Group (IMG), which then represented such sports stars as Björn Borg, Jimmy Connors, Jack Nicklaus, Arnold Palmer, Sebastian Coe and Alberto Salazar.

In January 1985, the Sidek family made history when they became the largest sibling group ever to represent the country abroad in the same sporting event. Misbun, Razif, Jalani, Rahman and Rashid were all selected to compete at the Hong Kong Open.

In 1986, Misbun reached the final of the All England Open for the only time in his career but he was beaten decisively there by Morten Frost.

Misbun's last full year at the top level of badminton on 1988, was rather special to him because he played with the Malaysian national badminton team which defeated their traditional rivals, the Indonesian national team for the first time in 21 years before losing the final to China.

== Coaching ==
Misbun was on the coaching staff, as his brother Rashid Sidek played men singles, for the 1992 Malaysia team which captured the Thomas Cup after a 25-year drought. In 1996, he and his brothers established a badminton club to find new talented players, called Nusa Mahsuri. He was a coach in Nusa Mahsuri, the first professional badminton club in Malaysia from 1996 to 2002.

He is Malaysia national team men's singles coach from 2003 to 2010. He has coached Malaysia's leading singles players from 1990s, including Rashid Sidek, the Hashim brothers, Roslin Hashim and Muhammad Hafiz Hashim, Wong Choong Hann, Lee Chong Wei and Wong Mew Choo. Under his coaching, Wong Mew Choo reached World No 7 in female category of BWF ranking. Roslin Hashim and Wong Choong Hann reached the World No 1 in BWF ranking. Wong Choong Hann also became silver medalist in BWF World Championships under his coaching. Meanwhile Hafiz Hashim won All-England champion and became World No 5 in BWF ranking under his coaching. Lee Chong Wei also reached the World No 1 in BWF ranking and the 2008 Olympics men's singles final and became Olympic silver medalist and won countless of BWF tournaments under his coaching. In July 2017, Misbun was reappointed as Malaysia national team men's singles head coach. He coached Lee Zii Jia during the latter's early career.

== Personal life ==
He was married to Datin Latifah Sidek from 1986 until her death due to COVID-19 on 23 July 2021. They have seven children: Lia Nurmila (1987–1996), Misbun Syawal Misbun (born 1988), 33, twins, Lia Murni and Misbun Ramdan (born 1990), 31, Lia Alifah (born 1996), 25, Lia Dewi Rubita (born 1998), 23 and Misbun Awalauddin (born 2000), 21 (ages as of July 2021). Misbun Ramdan is also a professional badminton player.

== Filmography ==
=== Film ===
Year	Title	Role
1994	Black Widow – Wajah Ayu	Imran

== In popular culture ==
He was portrayed by Rosyam Nor in the 2018 biopic film of Malaysian badminton player Lee Chong Wei entitled Lee Chong Wei: Rise of the Legend which was released on 15 March 2018.

In another movie entitled Gold, Misbun was portrayed by another actor, Wan Raja and was paired with fellow actor Farid Kamil as his brother, Rashid Sidek, in which the movie was released in 2024.

== Achievements ==
=== World Championships ===
Men's Doubles
Year	Venue	Partner	Opponent	Score	Result
1980	Istora Senayan, Jakarta, Indonesia	(Malaysia) Jalani Sidek	(Indonesia) Ade Chandra (Indonesia) Christian Hadinata	9–15, 10–15	Bronze

=== World Cup ===
Men's singles
Year	Venue	Opponent	Score	Result
1982	Stadium Negara, Kuala Lumpur, Malaysia	(Indonesia) Liem Swie King	12–15, 15–3, 12–15	Silver
1983	Stadium Negara, Kuala Lumpur, Malaysia	(Indonesia) Hastomo Arbi	12–15, 15–5, 9–15	Bronze
1985	Istora Senayan, Jakarta, Indonesia	(Indonesia) Icuk Sugiarto	4–15, 2–15	Bronze

=== Asian Championships ===
Men's singles
Year	Venue	Opponent	Score	Result
1985	Stadium Negara, Kuala Lumpur, Malaysia	(Indonesia) Icuk Sugiarto	9–15, 15–2, 10–9, retired	Bronze

=== Southeast Asian Games ===
Men's singles
Year	Venue	Opponent	Score	Result
1981	Camp Crame Hall, Manila, Philippines	(Indonesia) Hastomo Arbi	10–15, 16–18	Bronze
1987	Kuningan Hall, Jakarta, Indonesia	(Indonesia) Eddy Kurniawan	5–15, 8–15	Bronze

Men's Doubles
Year	Venue	Partner	Opponent	Score	Result
1979	Gema Sumantri Hall, Jakarta, Indonesia	(Malaysia) Ong Teong Boon	(Indonesia) Ade Chandra (Indonesia) Christian Hadinata	12–15, 9–15	Bronze

=== International tournaments ===
Men's singles
Year	Tournament	Opponent	Score	Result
1981	German Open	(India) Syed Modi	18–17, 15–10	(gold) Winner
1982	Swedish Open	(Indonesia) Icuk Sugiarto	9–15, 18–14, 15–13	(gold) Winner
1983	German Open	(Denmark) Steen Fladberg	18–13, 15–6	(gold) Winner
1983	Swedish Open	(Denmark) Morten Frost	9–15, 15–10, 15–13	(gold) Winner
1983	Canadian Open	(Denmark) Jens Peter Nierhoff	15–6, 11–15, 15–12	(gold) Winner
1985	Malaysia Open	(Denmark) Michael Kjeldsen	18–16, 15–3	(gold) Winner
1985	Malaysia Masters	(Denmark) Morten Frost	4–15, 7–15	(silver) Runner-up
1986	All England Open	(Denmark) Morten Frost	2–15, 8–15	(silver) Runner-up
1986	China Open	(Indonesia) Icuk Sugiarto	11–15, 13–15	(silver) Runner-up
1986	Malaysia Open	(China) Zhao Jianhua	10–15, 13–15	(silver) Runner-up
1987	Chinese Taipei Open	(South Korea) Park Joo-bong	5–15, 15–9, 15–3	(gold) Winner
1987	Singapore Open	(Indonesia) Eddy Kurniawan	15–13, 15–8	(gold) Winner

== Honours ==
- Malaysia:
  - Member of the Order of the Defender of the Realm (A.M.N.) (1982)
  - Herald of the Order of Loyalty to the Royal Family of Malaysia (B.S.D.) (1988)
  - Commander of the Order of Meritorious Service (P.J.N.) – Datuk (2021)
- Selangor
  - Recipient of the Meritorious Service Medal (P.J.K.) (1983)
- Malacca
  - Companion Class I of the Exalted Order of Malacca (D.M.S.M.) – Dato' (2008)

== See also ==
- Razif Sidek
- Jalani Sidek
- Rahman Sidek
- Rashid Sidek
