= Sidek Abdullah Kamar =

Malaysian badminton coach and player

Yang Berbahagia Dato' Haji Sidek Abdullah Kamar DSSA AMN
- Born: Mohd Sidek bin Abdullah Kamar; 19 January 1936; Telok Bunut, Banting, Selangor, British Malaya (now Malaysia)
- Died: 17 October 2005 (aged 69); Klang, Selangor, Malaysia
- Education: SMKA Al-Mashoor (L), Penang
- Occupation: Badminton coach
- Known for: Father of the Sidek brothers
- Spouses: Rukinah Sulaiman (1954-2003; her death); Juriah Abd Wahab (2003; divorced); Bangaton Rasman (2003-2005; her death)
- Children: 8 (6 sons & 2 daughters)

Mohd Sidek Abdullah Kamar (19 January 1936 – 17 October 2005) was a Malaysian badminton coach, former player and the father of Malaysia's most famous badminton-playing family, Sidek brothers who represented Malaysia in badminton.

It was his sons who played the biggest roles to take Malaysia out of the doldrums in world badminton, culminating in the success to regain the Thomas Cup after a lapse of 25 years in 1992.

Sidek laid the groundwork for his son's rise to stardom in Malaysian badminton. Led by Misbun, the Sidek brothers began their domination of the game from the early 1980s to 2000.

== Early life and education ==
Sidek was born on 19 January 1936, at Telok Bunut, Banting, Selangor and grew up in Kampung Kanchong Darat, Banting. He attended the SMKA Al-Mashoor (L) Islamic religious school in Penang. His father, Abdullah Kamar Salimin was a farmer and herdsman. (Note: In the seventeenth edition of the Anak-Anak Sidek, it was stated that during Sidek’s childhood days, his father was a strict person because the way he educates his children using the tough love method, was worse than Sidek’s, owing that the norms of educating and disciplining children especially in Asian societies those days was strict, no matter how poor nor rich their class, as most of the poor society were illiterate and uneducated, what more denied opportunity to find a living due to harsh socio-economic conditions, hence they just inherit and maintain indirectly or directly, what their ancestors practiced centuries ago in instilling discipline from an early age in order to have a much better, successful quality of life in the modern era nowadays. But somehow, Sidek himself was also a mischievous child unlike any other normal children during his childhood and teenage years. When Haji Abdullah Kamar went to Mecca in the early 1950s for the Hajj pilgrimage, he brought Sidek together to perform that religious obligation. After they returned home from Mecca, Sidek’s habits changed slowly, he still remained as a strict but also simultaneously a loving father in many ways to his children and as well as a doting grandfather to all his grandchildren without any favouritism.)

== Career ==
In 1957, Sidek started playing competitively at the age of 21. From 1959 to 1964, he became the Kuala Langat district-level champion (singles and doubles with Sukarman Abdul Rahim). From that period, he became Malay junior champion (1959) and Novice Cup champion (1964).

From 1964 until his death in 2005, Sidek retired early from badminton career and trained his children at a self-built two-court outdoor badminton hall in front of his home; later he groomed youngsters at the Kg. Kanchong Darat Civic Centre (a two-court multi-purpose badminton hall).

== Highlights of his children’s achievements ==
Misbun: National champion (1980-1984 and 1986–1987); National Sportsman award (1981,1983); World Cup runner-up (1982); All-England runner-up (1986).

Razif-Jalani: All-England champion (1982); World Grand Prix Finals champions (1986, 1988, 1989, 1991); Commonwealth Games (1990); World Cup champions (1990, 1991); Thomas Cup champions (1992); Barcelona Olympics bronze medal (1992).

Rashid: Commonwealth Games champion (1990, 1994); Thomas Cup champions (1992); Atlanta Olympics bronze medal (1996); All-England runner-up (1996); National Sportsman Award (1990, 1991, 1992, 1996).

Rahman: Member of the Thomas Cup winning team (1992).

Zamaliah: Member of Commonwealth Games silver medal-winning team (1994).

== Personal life ==
Sidek was married thrice. His first marriage was with his first wife, Rukinah Sulaiman (1938–2003) in 1954, when he was 18 and she was only 16 (Note: In the first edition of the Anak-Anak Sidek, it was stated that Sidek and his wife, Rukinah who is also his own cousin, never meet each other face-to-face, what more been in a prior romantic relationship until the moment they were united in matrimony. Four years after their marriage in 1958, Sidek and Rukinah were blessed with many children, the first-born being Rusitah then followed by many others including the Sidek brothers themselves. Sidek's father, Haji Abdullah Kamar Salimin died in 1958, before he get the opportunity to see all his other subsequent grandchildren being born, but was still alive when he was able to see the birth of his eldest-born grandchild cum granddaughter, Rusitah in that same year just before his own demise.) and they have 8 children namely Rusitah (born 1958), Misbun (born 1960), Razif (born 1962), Jalani (born 1964), Rahman (born 1966), Rashid (born 1968), Zamaliah (born 1976) and Shahrizan (born 1978).

After his wife, Rukinah whom he fondly called Kinah died in January 2003, he remarried Juriah Abd Wahab, but divorced after a short while. Then, Sidek later married his third wife Bangaton Rasman also in 2003 and it lasted until her death two years later in 2005. In both Anak-anak Sidek comic series and real life, Sidek is very known for his hot-tempered habit.

== Death ==
Sidek died at about 2:25am on 17 October 2005, during that year's seasonal observance of the Islamic holy month of Ramadan at the Tengku Ampuan Rahimah Hospital (HTAR) in Klang, at the age of 69 due to kidney failure, diabetes, pneumonia and high blood pressure. He was buried at the Banting Muslim cemetery.

His wife, Rukinah Sulaiman, suffered a stroke and died on January 30, 2003, at the age of 65.

== Honours ==
- 1990: Benson and Hedges Gold Award for Sports Personality.
- 2003: Malaysia's all-time sports personality award from Sports Ministry.
- 2003: Presented with honorary doctorate in Sports Science by Universiti Putra Malaysia (UPM).

=== Honours of Malaysia ===
- Malaysia:
  - Member of the Order of the Defender of the Realm (A.M.N.) (1987)
- Selangor:
  - Knight Companion of the Order of Sultan Salahuddin Abdul Aziz Shah (D.S.S.A.) – Dato' (1989)
  - Recipient of the Meritorious Service Medal (P.J.K.) (1980)

== See also ==
- Sidek brothers
- Misbun Sidek
- Razif Sidek
- Jalani Sidek
- Rahman Sidek
- Rashid Sidek
