= Lawn Tennis Association of Malaysia =

The Lawn Tennis Association of Malaysia (LTAM) is the national governing body for tennis in Malaysia founded in 1965.

In March 2014, the Lawn Tennis Association of Malaysia partnered with the Malaysian National Sports Council to open a National Tennis Academy at the National Tennis Centre in Jalan Duta, Kuala Lumpur.

== Events ==
=== Domestic ===
LTAM National Junior Tour 2016

LTAM National Circuit 2016

1st ITF Terengganu Junior Championship Grade 4 2016

Milo MBPJ Junior Championship 2016

=== International ===
- 2016 Davis Cup
