= Tricia Chuah =

Malaysian squash player (born 1982)

Personal information
- Born: 31 October 1982 (age 43) Kuala Lumpur, Malaysia

Sport
- Country: Malaysia
- Turned pro: 2000
- Coached by: Liz Irving, Jamshed Gul, Raymond Arnold
- Retired: 2009
- Racquet used: Prince

Women's singles
- Highest ranking: No. 25 (January 2007)
- Updated on 20 December 2009

Tricia Chuah (born 31 October 1982 in Kuala Lumpur) is a retired professional squash player who represented Malaysia.

Tricia grew up in Kuala Lumpur, Malaysia and started playing squash at the start of her teens. At sixteen, she started to compete internationally, and turned professional in 2000.

Tricia was coached by Jamshed Gul as a junior and Raymond Arnold with the Malaysian national squad. As a junior, she won a number of international titles including the Scottish Junior Open, and was a member of the national team which won the Asian Junior Championship twice and participated in the Commonwealth Youth Games in Scotland. As a senior, she won her first WISPA Tour title in 2005 in the Women's Islamic Games and has represented Malaysia in numerous Asian Squash Championships, World Team Squash Championships, the 2006 Commonwealth Games and World Doubles Squash Championships.
