= 1979 Thomas Cup qualification =

Tournament details
- Dates: 27 August 1978 – 25 February 1979
- Location: Asian zone: Kuala Lumpur American zone: Lima; Ottawa; European zone: Brussels; Carlisle; Haarlem; Heerlen; Oslo; Sunderland; Umeå Australasian zone: Invercargill; Perth

The qualifying process for the 1979 Thomas Cup took place from 27 August 1978 to 25 February 1979 to decide the final teams which will play in the final tournament.

== Qualification process ==
The qualification process is divided into four regions, the Asian Zone, the American Zone, the European Zone and the Australasian Zone. Teams in their respective zone will compete in a knockout format. Teams will compete for two days, with two singles and doubles played on the first day and three singles and two doubles played on the next day. The teams that win their respective zone will earn a place in the final tournament to be held in Jakarta.

Indonesia qualified for the inter-zone play-offs as defending champions and hosts.

=== Qualified teams ===
Country	Qualified as	Qualified on	Final appearance
Indonesia	1976 Thomas Cup winners	5 June 1976	8th
India	Asian Zone winners	25 February 1979	4th
Denmark	European Zone winners	18 February 1979	11th
Canada	American Zone winners	14 January 1979	4th
Japan	Australasian Zone winners	24 September 1978	3rd

== Asian Zone ==
=== Bracket ===
First round
India	w/o
Pakistan
Thailand
Bye
November 1978
Singapore	w/o
Sri Lanka	w/o
Malaysia
Bye

Semi-finals
India	w/o
Thailand
Bye
Malaysia

Final
24 February 1979 – Kuala Lumpur
India	5
Malaysia	4

=== First round ===
In the first round of the Asian zone, the tie between Singapore and Sri Lanka was not played due to both teams withdrawing their affiliation with the International Badminton Federation. The two teams were consequently scratched from the competition. Pakistan also withdrew their affiliation to the IBF and was also scratched from the competition. In May 1978, the IBF banned their members from taking part in any badminton events sanctioned by the World Badminton Federation, which was a rival and opposition to the IBF. The IBF also barred their members from taking part in the 1978 WBF World Championships in Bangkok.

=== Semi-finals ===
Thailand were due to play the winners of the India-Pakistan tie. It was later revealed that the Thai team were excluded from the competition and India would directly face Malaysia in the Asian zone final. Phiensak Sosothikul, who was the General Secretary of the Badminton Association of Thailand at the time, received a letter from the IBF, requesting them to declare which badminton federation they officially recognized. The IBF also warned the Thai association that recognition of the WBF would result in a total ban from participating in the Thomas Cup.

=== Final ===
Malaysia
4
Kuala Lumpur, Malaysia
24–25 February 1979

India
5

			1	2	3
1	(Malaysia) (India)	Saw Swee Leong; Syed Modi	15; 11	15; 10
2	(Malaysia) (India)	Phua Ah Hua; Prakash Padukone	4; 15	1; 15
3	(Malaysia) (India)	James Selvaraj / Moo Foot Lian; Prakash Padukone / Uday Pawar	5; 15	10; 15
4	(Malaysia) (India)	Ho Khim Soon / Kwek Chiew Peng; Pradeep Gandhe / Sanjay Sharma	7; 15	8; 15
5	(Malaysia) (India)	Saw Swee Leong; Prakash Padukone	5; 15	8; 15
6	(Malaysia) (India)	James Selvaraj; Pradeep Gandhe	15; 11	15; 12
7	(Malaysia) (India)	Phua Ah Hua; Syed Modi	7; 15	15; 10	1; 15
8	(Malaysia) (India)	James Selvaraj / Moo Foot Lian; Pradeep Gandhe / Sanjay Sharma	15; 11	15; 5
9	(Malaysia) (India)	Ho Khim Soon / Kwek Chiew Peng; Leroy D'Sa / Uday Pawar	15; 4	15; 4

== American Zone ==
=== Bracket ===
First round
United States
Bye
19 October 1978 – Lima
Canada	9
Peru	0
Mexico
Bye
Taiwan
Bye

Semi-finals
13 January 1979 – Ottawa
United States	4
Canada	5
December 1978
Mexico	w/o
Taiwan

Final
27 February 1979 – Kelowna
Canada	w/o
Mexico

=== First round ===
Canada
9
Lima, Peru
19–20 October 1978

Peru
0

			1	2	3
1	(Canada) (Peru)	Jamie McKee; Alfredo Salazar	15; 11	15; 3
2	(Canada) (Peru)	John Czich; Jorge Masson	15; 0	15; 13
3	(Canada) (Peru)	Ian Johnson / Pat Tryon; Federico Valdez / Germán Valdez	15; 8	15; 7
4	(Canada) (Peru)	David deBelle / Paul Johnson; Ricardo Newton / Guillermo Zavala	15; 7	15; 6
5	(Canada) (Peru)	Pat Tryon; Gustavo Salazar	15; 8	15; 9
6	(Canada) (Peru)	John Czich; Alfredo Salazar	15; 5	15; 3
7	(Canada) (Peru)	Jamie McKee; Jorge Masson	15; 5	15; 5
8	(Canada) (Peru)	David deBelle / Paul Johnson; Federico Valdez / Germán Valdez	15; 9	15; 9
9	(Canada) (Peru)	Roy Díaz González / Jorge Palazuelos; Ricardo Newton / Guillermo Zavala	18; 14	15; 11

=== Semi-finals ===
Canada
5
Ottawa, Canada
13–14 January 1979

United States
4

			1	2	3
1	(Canada) (United States)	John Czich; Chris Kinard	15; 12	15; 3
2	(Canada) (United States)	Jamie McKee; Gary Higgins	15; 12	15; 11
3	(Canada) (United States)	Ian Johnson / Pat Tryon; Mathew Fogarty / Mike Walker	7; 15	7; 15
4	(Canada) (United States)	David deBelle / Paul Johnson; John Britton / Charles Coakley	3; 15	15; 11	15; 7
5	(Canada) (United States)	John Czich; Gary Higgins	12; 15	10; 15
6	(Canada) (United States)	Pat Tryon; Mike Walker	6; 15	15; 6	18; 15
7	(Canada) (United States)	Jamie McKee; Chris Kinard	17; 14	15; 8
8	(Canada) (United States)	Ian Johnson / Pat Tryon; John Britton / Charles Coakley	12; 15	12; 15
9	(Canada) (United States)	David deBelle / Paul Johnson; Mathew Fogarty / Mike Walker	3; 15	10; 15

=== Final ===
The final of the American zone between Canada and Mexico was cancelled when the Mexican team pulled out of the competition because the team was not ready. Therefore, Canada advanced to the final tournament.

== European Zone ==
=== Bracket ===
First round
Belgium
Bye
19 October 1978 – Sunderland
Scotland	0
England	9
Bye
Bye
Sweden
Bye
10 November 1978 – Oslo
Netherlands	6
Norway	3
West Germany
Bye
Bye
Bye
Bye
Denmark

Second round
24 November 1978 – Brussels
Belgium	0
England	9
Bye
Sweden
16 December 1978 – Heerlen
Netherlands	5
West Germany	4
Bye
Denmark

Semi-finals
30 January 1979 – Carlisle
England	3
Sweden	6
10 January 1979 – Haarlem
Netherlands	1
Denmark	8

Final
17 February 1979 – Umeå
Sweden	2
Denmark	7

=== First round ===
England
9
Sunderland, England
19 October 1978

Scotland
0

			1	2	3
1	(England) (Scotland)	Ray Stevens; Anthony Dawson	15; 0	15; 2
2	(England) (Scotland)	Derek Talbot; Charlie Gallagher	15; 6	15; 7
3	(England) (Scotland)	David Eddy / Eddy Sutton; Billy Gilliland / Fraser Gow	15; 11	9; 15	15; 4
4	(England) (Scotland)	Ray Stevens / Mike Tredgett; Gordon Hamilton / Dan Travers	15; 4	13; 15	15; 8
5	(England) (Scotland)	Kevin Jolly; Dan Travers	15; 3	15; 6
6	(England) (Scotland)	Derek Talbot; Anthony Dawson	15; 5	15; 5
7	(England) (Scotland)	Ray Stevens; Charlie Gallagher	15; 11	15; 2
8	(England) (Scotland)	David Eddy / Eddy Sutton; Gordon Hamilton / Dan Travers	17; 15	9; 15	15; 6
9	(England) (Scotland)	Ray Stevens / Mike Tredgett; Billy Gilliland / Fraser Gow	15; 2	15; 9

Netherlands
6
Oslo, Norway
10–11 November 1978

Norway
3

			1	2	3
1	(Netherlands) (Norway)	Rob Ridder; Petter Thoresen	15; 7	15; 12
2	(Netherlands) (Norway)	Guus van der Vlugt; Geir Dahl	15; 5	15; 8
3	(Netherlands) (Norway)	Guus de Vogel / Herman Leidelmeijer; Harald Nettli / Hans Sperre	15; 9	15; 6
4	(Netherlands) (Norway)	Piet Ridder / Rob Ridder; Haakon Ringdal / Petter Thoresen	15; 4	15; 6
5	(Netherlands) (Norway)	Clemens Wortel; Haakon Ringdal	12; 15	7; 15
6	(Netherlands) (Norway)	Rob Ridder; Geir Dahl	15; 2	15; 5
7	(Netherlands) (Norway)	Guus van der Vlugt; Petter Thoresen	6; 15	5; 15
8	(Netherlands) (Norway)	Piet Ridder / Rob Ridder; Harald Nettli / Hans Sperre	15; 6	15; 13
9	(Netherlands) (Norway)	Guus de Vogel / Herman Leidelmeijer; Haakon Ringdal / Petter Thoresen	10; 15	4; 15

=== Second round ===
England
9
Brussels, Belgium
24–25 November 1978

Belgium
0

			1	2	3
1	(England) (Belgium)	Ray Stevens; Jean Pierre Bauduin	15; 6	15; 4
2	(England) (Belgium)	Derek Talbot; Michel Gosset	15; 5	15; 5
3	(England) (Belgium)	David Eddy / Eddy Sutton; Daniel Gosset / Mare Muraille	15; 9	15; 3
4	(England) (Belgium)	Ray Stevens / Mike Tredgett; Jean Pierre Bauduin / John Jaury	15; 12	15; 6
5	(England) (Belgium)	Kevin Jolly; Dominique Kaiser	15; 2	15; 2
6	(England) (Belgium)	Derek Talbot; Jean Pierre Bauduin	15; 7	15; 5
7	(England) (Belgium)	Ray Stevens; Michel Gosset	15; 5	15; 1
8	(England) (Belgium)	David Eddy / Eddy Sutton; Jean Pierre Bauduin / John Jaury	15; 3	15; 8
9	(England) (Belgium)	Ray Stevens / Mike Tredgett; Daniel Gosset / Mare Muraille	15; 1	15; 7

West Germany
4
Heerlen, Netherlands
16–17 December 1978

Netherlands
5

			1	2	3
1	(West Germany) (Netherlands)	Karl-Heinz Zwiebler; Rob Ridder	6; 15	0; 15
2	(West Germany) (Netherlands)	Michael Schnaase; Guus van der Vlugt	15; 5	15; 10
3	(West Germany) (Netherlands)	Roland Maywald / Karl-Heinz Zwiebler; Piet Ridder / Rob Ridder	15; 4	15; 5
4	(West Germany) (Netherlands)	Horst Lösche / Michael Schnaase; Herman Leidelmeijer / Guus van der Vlugt	8; 15	11; 15
5	(West Germany) (Netherlands)	Michael Schnaase; Rob Ridder	4; 15	15; 7	3; 15
6	(West Germany) (Netherlands)	Karl-Heinz Zwiebler; Guus van der Vlugt	5; 15	12; 15
7	(West Germany) (Netherlands)	Roland Maywald; Clemens Wortel	17; 18	15; 5	15; 11
8	(West Germany) (Netherlands)	Horst Lösche / Michael Schnaase; Piet Ridder / Rob Ridder	15; 11	4; 15	15; 4
9	(West Germany) (Netherlands)	Roland Maywald / Karl-Heinz Zwiebler; Herman Leidelmeijer / Guus van der Vlugt	15; 5	17; 18	17; 18

=== Semi-finals ===
Sweden
6
Carlisle, England
30–31 January 1979

England
3

			1	2	3
1	(Sweden) (England)	Thomas Kihlström; Ray Stevens	15; 18	15; 3	9; 15
2	(Sweden) (England)	Sture Johnsson; Derek Talbot	17; 14	15; 5
3	(Sweden) (England)	Bengt Fröman / Thomas Kihlström; Ray Stevens / Mike Tredgett	10; 15	5; 15
4	(Sweden) (England)	Stefan Karlsson / Claes Nordin; Elliot Stuart / Derek Talbot	12; 15	17; 16	15; 12
5	(Sweden) (England)	Sture Johnsson; Ray Stevens	10; 15	9; 15
6	(Sweden) (England)	Thomas Kihlström; Derek Talbot	15; 13	15; 2
7	(Sweden) (England)	Stefan Karlsson; Kevin Jolly	9; 15	18; 13	15; 4
8	(Sweden) (England)	Bengt Fröman / Thomas Kihlström; Elliot Stuart / Derek Talbot	5; 15	15; 3	18; 13
9	(Sweden) (England)	Stefan Karlsson / Claes Nordin; Ray Stevens / Mike Tredgett	15; 10	15; 7

Denmark
8
Haarlem, Netherlands
10–11 January 1979

Netherlands
1

			1	2	3
1	(Denmark) (Netherlands)	Flemming Delfs; Rob Ridder	11; 15	15; 12	15; 5
2	(Denmark) (Netherlands)	Svend Pri; Guus van der Vlugt	15; 10	15; 13
3	(Denmark) (Netherlands)	Flemming Delfs / Steen Skovgaard; Piet Ridder / Rob Ridder	15; 7	15; 9
4	(Denmark) (Netherlands)	Steen Fladberg / Morten Frost; Herman Leidelmeijer / Guus van der Vlugt	15; 7	15; 9
5	(Denmark) (Netherlands)	Svend Pri; Rob Ridder	5; 15	14; 17
6	(Denmark) (Netherlands)	Flemming Delfs; Guus van der Vlugt	15; 6	15; 9
7	(Denmark) (Netherlands)	Morten Frost; Clemens Wortel	15; 5	15; 6
8	(Denmark) (Netherlands)	Flemming Delfs / Steen Skovgaard; Herman Leidelmeijer / Guus van der Vlugt	15; 8	13; 15	15; 2
9	(Denmark) (Netherlands)	Steen Fladberg / Morten Frost; Piet Ridder / Rob Ridder	15; 4	15; 5

=== Final ===
Denmark
7
Umeå, Sweden
17–18 February 1979

Sweden
2

			1	2	3
1	(Denmark) (Sweden)	Flemming Delfs; Sture Johnsson	15; 9	15; 11
2	(Denmark) (Sweden)	Morten Frost; Thomas Kihlström	15; 7	15; 4
3	(Denmark) (Sweden)	Flemming Delfs / Steen Skovgaard; Stefan Karlsson / Claes Nordin	15; 4	15; 1
4	(Denmark) (Sweden)	Steen Fladberg / Morten Frost; Bengt Fröman / Thomas Kihlström	15; 7	9; 15	1; 15
5	(Denmark) (Sweden)	Morten Frost; Sture Johnsson	15; 9	15; 8
6	(Denmark) (Sweden)	Flemming Delfs; Thomas Kihlström	15; 17	15; 11	7; 15
7	(Denmark) (Sweden)	Svend Pri; Christian Lundberg	15; 5	15; 8
8	(Denmark) (Sweden)	Steen Fladberg / Morten Frost; Stefan Karlsson / Claes Nordin	16; 17	15; 10	15; 12
9	(Denmark) (Sweden)	Flemming Delfs / Steen Skovgaard; Bengt Fröman / Thomas Kihlström	15; 11	15; 7

== Australasian Zone ==
=== Bracket ===
Semi-finals
27 August 1978 – Invercargill
New Zealand	4
Japan	5
Australia
Bye

Final
23 September 1978 – Perth
Japan	9
Australia	0

=== Semi-finals ===
New Zealand
4
Invercargill, New Zealand
27–28 August 1978

Japan
5

			1	2	3
1	(New Zealand) (Japan)	Richard Purser; Kinji Zeniya	15; 12	15; 13
2	(New Zealand) (Japan)	Bryan Purser; Masao Tsuchida	15; 10	15; 9
3	(New Zealand) (Japan)	Warren Johns / Ross Livingston; Nobutaka Ikeda / Shoichi Toganoo	6; 15	4; 15
4	(New Zealand) (Japan)	Bryan Purser / Richard Purser; Yoshitaka Iino / Masao Tsuchida	8; 15	13; 18
5	(New Zealand) (Japan)	Ross Livingston; Yoshitaka Iino	15; 12	15; 11
6	(New Zealand) (Japan)	Bryan Purser; Kinji Zeniya	1; 15	6; 15
7	(New Zealand) (Japan)	Richard Purser; Masao Tsuchida	18; 15	15; 10
8	(New Zealand) (Japan)	Bryan Purser / Richard Purser; Nobutaka Ikeda / Shoichi Toganoo	5; 15	12; 15
9	(New Zealand) (Japan)	Warren Johns / Ross Livingston; Yoshitaka Iino / Masao Tsuchida	2; 15	8; 15

=== Final ===
Japan
9
Perth, Australia
23–24 September 1978

Australia
0

			1	2	3
1	(Japan) (Australia)	Masao Tsuchida; Peter Cooper	6; 15	15; 5	15; 4
2	(Japan) (Australia)	Kinji Zeniya; Mark Harry	15; 10	18; 16
3	(Japan) (Australia)	Nobutaka Ikeda / Shoichi Toganoo; Mark Harry / Michael Scandolera	15; 5	15; 9
4	(Japan) (Australia)	Yoshitaka Iino / Masao Tsuchida; Peter Cooper / Paul Kong	15; 3	18; 14
5	(Japan) (Australia)	Yoshitaka Iino; Michael Scandolera	15; 3	15; 1
6	(Japan) (Australia)	Masao Tsuchida; Mark Harry	15; 12	15; 12
7	(Japan) (Australia)	Kinji Zeniya; Peter Cooper	15; 5	15; 7
8	(Japan) (Australia)	Nobutaka Ikeda / Shoichi Toganoo; Peter Cooper / Paul Kong	15; 7	15; 8
9	(Japan) (Australia)	Yoshitaka Iino / Masao Tsuchida; Mark Harry / Michael Scandolera	15; 2	15; 5
