= 1979 Thomas Cup knockout stage =

Badminton tournament

The knockout stage for the 1979 Thomas Cup began on 24 May 1979 with the first-round knockout and ended on 2 June with the final tie.

== Qualified teams ==
The teams that won their zonal tie qualified for the final knockout stage.

Group	Winners
CH	Indonesia
AS	India
AM	Canada
AU	Japan
EU	Denmark

== Bracket ==
First round
Indonesia
Bye
24 May 1979 – Jakarta
Canada	1
Japan	8
Denmark
Bye
Bye
India

Second round
28 May 1979 – Jakarta
Indonesia	9
Japan	0
26 May 1979 – Jakarta
Denmark	7
India	2

Challenge round
1 June 1979 – Jakarta
Indonesia	9
Denmark	0

== First round ==
The inter-zone ties (team matches) were hosted by defending champion Indonesia at Jakarta in late May and early June. Contesting in an out-bracket tie for the right to play Indonesia in the semifinals, Japan decisively defeated Canada 8–1, U.S. born Pat Tryon scoring the lone point for the Canadians.

=== Canada vs Japan ===
Canada
1
Istora Senayan
24–25 May 1979

Japan
8

			1	2	3
1	(Canada) (Japan)	Pat Tryon; Kinji Zeniya	10; 15	6; 15
2	(Canada) (Japan)	John Czich; Masao Tsuchida	7; 15	11; 15
3	(Canada) (Japan)	Ian Johnson / Bob MacDougall; Mikio Ozaki / Toshihiro Tsuji	8; 15	8; 15
4	(Canada) (Japan)	David deBelle / Paul Johnson; Yoshitaka Iino / Masao Tsuchida	4; 15	9; 15
5	(Canada) (Japan)	Paul Johnson; Hiroyuki Hasegawa	15; 11	11; 15	10; 15
6	(Canada) (Japan)	Pat Tryon; Masao Tsuchida	15; 9	15; 12
7	(Canada) (Japan)	John Czich; Kinji Zeniya	16; 18	15; 4	15; 18
8	(Canada) (Japan)	Ian Johnson / Bob MacDougall; Yoshitaka Iino / Masao Tsuchida	3; 15	1; 15
9	(Canada) (Japan)	David deBelle / Paul Johnson; Mikio Ozaki / Toshihiro Tsuji	4; 15	14; 15

== Second round ==
The first semifinal tie pitted Denmark against India in what might have been expected to have been a very close encounter. Typically talented, Danish squads had also, typically, struggled in the tropical heat and humidity. This time, however, Denmark came through in the uncongenial climate 7–2; the pivotal match probably being wily veteran Svend Pri's inspiring victory over the much younger Prakash Padukone (less than a year before Padukone's triumph at the All-England Championships).

The second semifinal presented Japan with the daunting task of facing a powerhouse Indonesian squad in an Indonesian setting. Moreover, these Japanese players, especially in singles, were not as internationally accomplished as the highly competitive Japanese stars of a decade earlier. It came as quite a surprise, then, when Japan's number one singles player, Kinji Zeniya, began the series by racing off to a 14–9 lead on reigning All-England champion Liem Swie King. This, however, was as close to a victory as Japan came. King recovered to win the game 17–16 and nearly blanked Zeniya in the second game. Fighting hard throughout, the Japanese were successively worn down by better players who were also more accustomed to the tropical conditions. It was the first time that Japan had been on the losing side of a Thomas Cup shut-out. Thus for the fourth time, the third in a championship tie, Indonesia and Denmark squared-off in Thomas Cup competition.

=== Denmark vs India ===
Denmark
7
Istora Senayan
26–27 May 1979

India
2

			1	2	3
1	(Denmark) (India)	Svend Pri; Syed Modi	15; 11	15; 6
2	(Denmark) (India)	Morten Frost; Prakash Padukone	10; 15	15; 18
3	(Denmark) (India)	Flemming Delfs / Steen Skovgaard; Prakash Padukone / Uday Pawar	17; 14	12; 15	15; 6
4	(Denmark) (India)	Steen Fladberg / Morten Frost; Partho Ganguli / Pradeep Gandhe	17; 14	15; 5
5	(Denmark) (India)	Flemming Delfs; Partho Ganguli	15; 10	10; 15	15; 5
6	(Denmark) (India)	Morten Frost; Syed Modi	6; 15	7; 15
7	(Denmark) (India)	Svend Pri; Prakash Padukone	17; 14	15; 3
8	(Denmark) (India)	Steen Fladberg / Morten Frost; Prakash Padukone / Uday Pawar	15; 11	15; 3
9	(Denmark) (India)	Flemming Delfs / Steen Skovgaard; Partho Ganguli / Pradeep Gandhe	12; 15	15; 8	10; 15

=== Indonesia vs Japan ===
Indonesia
9
Istora Senayan
28–29 May 1979

Japan
0

			1	2	3
1	(Indonesia) (Japan)	Liem Swie King; Kinji Zeniya	11; 16	15; 1	15
2	(Indonesia) (Japan)	Lius Pongoh; Masao Tsuchida	15; 5	18; 13
3	(Indonesia) (Japan)	Tjun Tjun / Johan Wahjudi; Nobutaka Ikeda / Shoichi Toganoo	15; 6	15; 4
4	(Indonesia) (Japan)	Christian Hadinata / Liem Swie King; Yoshitaka Iino / Masao Tsuchida	15; 2	15; 5
5	(Indonesia) (Japan)	Rudy Hartono; Toshihiro Tsuji	15; 8	15; 1
6	(Indonesia) (Japan)	Liem Swie King; Masao Tsuchida	11; 15	15; 2	15; 4
7	(Indonesia) (Japan)	Lius Pongoh; Kinji Zeniya	11; 15	15; 7	15; 4
8	(Indonesia) (Japan)	Tjun Tjun / Johan Wahjudi; Yoshitaka Iino / Masao Tsuchida	15; 8	15; 6
9	(Indonesia) (Japan)	Christian Hadinata / Liem Swie King; Nobutaka Ikeda / Shoichi Toganoo	15; 4	15; 5

== Challenge round ==
Though Svend Pri was 34 and by this time only the third ranked singles player in Denmark, his record of winning clutch singles matches in tropical conditions had earned him a slot in the top two singles positions. Indonesia might have placed the iconic Rudy Hartono (two months shy of 30) in a similar position in its lineup and thus effected a sequel to their long rivalry. It was not to be, as Indonesia placed Hartono in the third singles position. Nevertheless, in "veteran" Iie Sumirat, only a year younger than Hartono and, like Pri, something of a showman, Pri drew a worthy adversary. Their opening contest, the most interesting of the tie, was won by Sumirat 15–10 in the third game. Except for a three-game win by Sumirat over rising star Morten Frost on the second night, every other match was routinely taken by Indonesia. Flemming Delfs, whose play in the tropics was almost invariably a full level below its European standard, lost tamely to Hartono, and only one doubles game in eight was close. Thus for the second straight time Indonesia shut-out its final opponent in Thomas Cup, thereby winning the Cup for the seventh time in eight attempts.

=== Indonesia vs Denmark ===
Indonesia
9
Istora Senayan
1–2 June 1979

Denmark
0

			1	2	3
1	(Indonesia) (Denmark)	Iie Sumirat; Svend Pri	11; 15	15; 7	15; 10
2	(Indonesia) (Denmark)	Liem Swie King; Morten Frost	15; 3	15; 6
3	(Indonesia) (Denmark)	Tjun Tjun / Johan Wahjudi; Flemming Delfs / Steen Skovgaard	15; 2	15; 3
4	(Indonesia) (Denmark)	Christian Hadinata / Liem Swie King; Steen Fladberg / Morten Frost	15; 8	15; 2
5	(Indonesia) (Denmark)	Rudy Hartono; Flemming Delfs	15; 10	15; 2
6	(Indonesia) (Denmark)	Iie Sumirat; Morten Frost	11; 15	15; 9	15; 8
7	(Indonesia) (Denmark)	Liem Swie King; Svend Pri	15; 8	15; 1
8	(Indonesia) (Denmark)	Tjun Tjun / Johan Wahjudi; Steen Fladberg / Morten Frost	15; 9	15; 5
9	(Indonesia) (Denmark)	Christian Hadinata / Liem Swie King; Flemming Delfs / Steen Skovgaard	17; 16	15; 4
