= Athletics at the 1973 SEAP Games =

The athletics competition at the 1973 SEAP Games were held at the National Stadium, Singapore. Athletics events was held between 2 September to 5 September.

== Medal summary ==
=== Men ===
Event	Gold		Silver		Bronze	
100 m	(Thailand) Anat Ratanapol	10.5	(Thailand) Suchart Jairsuraparp	10.5	(Khmer Republic) Samphon Mao	10.7
200 m	(Thailand) Anat Ratanapol	21.6	(Malaysia) Sinnayah Sabapathy	22.3	(Khmer Republic) Samphon Mao	22.3
400 m	(Malaysia) Baba Singhe Peyadesa	48.2	(Khmer Republic) Savin Chem	48.5	(Thailand) Sayan Paratanavong	48.9
800 m	(Myanmar) Jimmy Crampton	1:51.4	(Malaysia) Ramasamy Subramaniam	1:52.9	(Singapore) Serjit Singh	1:58.0
1500 m	(Myanmar) Jimmy Crampton	3:52.8	(Malaysia) Ramasamy Subramaniam	3:54.1	(Malaysia) K. Kumarasan	3:55.5
5000 m	(Myanmar) Aung Than	14:55.0	(Singapore) P. C. Suppiah	15:10.6	(Malaysia) A. Mahalingam	15:15.8
10,000 m	(Myanmar) Aung Than	31:02.8 CR	(Myanmar) Ko Ko	32:02.8	(Malaysia) A. Malayandy	32:06.55
Marathon	(Myanmar) Ko Ko	2:26:04.2	(Myanmar) Hla Thein	2:34:06.3	(Malaysia) Solaimuthu	2:42:03.6
110 m hurdles	(Malaysia) Ishtiaq Mubarak	14.6	(Myanmar) Hpone Myint	14.9	(Malaysia) Bala Merican	15.1
400 m hurdles	(Thailand) Tongchai Tipyamatee	53.5	(Malaysia) Karu Selvaratnam	53.7	(Myanmar) Gyee Ngwe	53.9
3000 m steeplechase	(Myanmar) Aung Than	9:14.2	(Singapore) S.P. Kannu	9:18.8	(Malaysia) A. Manickan	9:23.2
4 × 100 m relay	Thailand Anat Ratanapol; Suchart Jairsuraparp; Panus Ariyamongkol; Surapong Ariyamongkol	40.7 CR	Singapore Andrew Chee; Yeo Kian Chye; Ong Yoke Phee; Loh Chan Pew	41.6	Malaysia Janun Abdullah; Maarof Hussein; V. Sridaran; Sinnayah Sabapathy	41.9
4 × 400 m relay	Malaysia Baba Singhe Peyadesa; Sinnayah Sabapathy; Harun Rasheed Othman; Victor Asirvatham	3:11.2	Singapore Ho Mun Cheong; Cheah Kim Teck; Canagasabai Kunalan; Godfrey Jallah	3:11.3	Thailand Anat Ratanapol; Sayan Paratanavong; Sukhum Chatprasop; Wichit Chusakun	3:18.1
20 km walk	(Malaysia) Khoo Chong Beng	1:44:31.8	(Singapore) Nadarajan Rengasamy	1:46:54.2	(Myanmar) Kyaw Mying	1:50:57.8
50 km walk	(Myanmar) Kyaw Mying	4:53:16.2 CR	(Malaysia) Aziz Khalil	5:10:41.8	(Singapore) S. Dorairaj	5:19:43.6
Pole vault	(Myanmar) Kyaw Zaw	4.50	(Malaysia) Wong Chong Sai (Thailand) P. Munha	4.20		
High jump	(Singapore) Nor Azhar Hamid	2.12 m CR	(Malaysia) Yon bin Ismail	2.00	(Khmer Republic) Sitha Sin	1.99
Long jump	(Myanmar) Thant Zin	7.29 m	(Singapore) Lim Hong Kang	7.09	(Malaysia) Shazan Amir Rahman	7.07
Triple jump	(Malaysia) Shahlan Tahir	14.83 m	(Thailand) Chaiyasit Suriyachan	14.78	(Myanmar) Thant Zin	14.78
Shot put	(Myanmar) Saw Sarlawla	14.64 m	(Myanmar) Thien Win	13.50	(Malaysia) Lim Choong Watt	12.95
Discus throw	(Khmer Republic) Nhem Yeav	43.74 m	(Myanmar) Zaw Weik	43.42	(Thailand) Samai Chartmontri	41.60
Hammer throw	(Malaysia) Muthiah Dattaya	44.40 m	(Singapore) Eknath Mane	43.62	(Malaysia) Ghenda Singh	41.22
Javelin throw	(Malaysia) Nashatar Singh Sidhu	65.60 m	(Malaysia) Ballang Lasung	62.10	(Singapore) Jaw Tee Jang	60.48
Decathlon	(Malaysia) Janardhanan Vijayan	6,237 pts	(Singapore) Tang Ngai Kin	6,044	(Myanmar) Win WIn	6,023

=== Women ===
Event	Gold		Silver		Bronze	
100 m	(Singapore) Eng Chiew Guay	12.50	(Myanmar) Than Than	12.55	(Myanmar) Aye Shwe	12.59
200 m	(Singapore) Glory Barnabas	25.63	(Myanmar) Than Than Lwin	25.68	(Myanmar) Aye Shwe	25.7
400 m	(Myanmar) Than Than	55.3 CR	(Singapore) Chee Swee Lee	56.0	(Myanmar) Mar Mar Min	56.2
800 m	(Myanmar) Mar Mar Min	2:12.7 CR	(Singapore) Chee Swee Lee	2:12.8	(Malaysia) Yamunah Ramasamy	3:14.3
1500 m	(Myanmar) Nwe Nwe Yee	4:28.2	(Malaysia) Yamunah Ramasamy	4:41.2	(Singapore) Mirnigar Begum	4:41.8
100 m hurdles	(Singapore) Heather Merican	14.80 CR	(Myanmar) Nwe Nwe Yee	15.4	(Thailand) C. Kiewlongya	15.8
200 m hurdles	(Singapore) Heather Merican	28.8 sec	(Singapore) Gan Bee Wah	29.1	(Myanmar) Nwe Nwe Yee	29.9
4 × 100 m relay	Singapore Eng Chiew Guay; Sheila Fernando; Glory Barnabas; Gan Bee Wah	47.5	Myanmar Than Than; Aye Shwe; Nwe Nwe Yee ?	47.8	Malaysia Yamunah Nair; Irene Wan; Esther Thaddaus; Noreen Pereira	48.0
4 × 400 m relay	Burma Than Than; Than Than Htay; Aye Shwe; Mar Mar Min	3:38.7	Singapore Chee Swee Lee; C. Madathi; Chew Kim Hua; Maimoon Azlan	3:48.8	Malaysia Esther Thaddaus; Marina Chin; Junaidah Aman; Noraisah Wajib	4:00.1
10 km walk	(Myanmar) Su Su Yee	55:03.20 CR	(Singapore) Margaret Tan	55:41.7	(Malaysia) Cheah Bee Tin	55:54.00
High jump	(Malaysia) Gladys Chai	1.65 m CR	(Malaysia) Goh Li Kian (Myanmar) Eileen Chit	1.56		
Long jump	(Myanmar) Aye Shwe	5.74 m CR	(Malaysia) Gladys Chai	5.57	(Singapore) Koh Hong Phang	5.53
Shot put	(Myanmar) Jennifer Tinlay	13.7 m	(Thailand) K. Yientrong	11.51	(Myanmar) Paw Shwee	11.4
Discus throw	(Myanmar) Jennifer Tinlay	41.60 m	(Myanmar) Paw Shwee	39.86	(Khmer Republic) Uch Lay	37.54
Javelin throw	(Khmer Republic) Proch Thin	41.18 m	(Singapore) Chua Kim Tee	35.80	(Singapore) Kok Yin Ping	33.56

== Medal table ==
Rank	Nation	Gold	Silver	Bronze	Total
1	Burma (BIR)	18	11	9	38
2	Malaysia (MAS)	9	11	14	34
3	Singapore (SIN)	6	13	6	25
4	Thailand (THA)	4	5	4	13
5	Cambodia (KHM)	2	1	4	7
Totals (5 entries)		39	41	37	117
