= 1976 Thomas Cup qualification =

Tournament details
- Dates: 27 August 1975 – 3 April 1976
- Location: Asian zone: Colombo; Kuala Lumpur; Lahore; Ludhiana; Singapore; Tokyo American zone: Lima; Manhattan Beach; Mexico City; European zone: Copenhagen; Edinburgh; Geldrop; Helsinki; Mariestad Australasian zone: Hobart

The qualifying process for the 1976 Thomas Cup took place from 26 September 1975 to 3 April 1976 to decide the final teams which will play in the final tournament.

== Qualification process ==
The qualification process is divided into four regions, the Asian Zone, the American Zone, the European Zone and the Australasian Zone. Teams in their respective zone will compete in a knockout format. Teams will compete for two days, with two singles and doubles played on the first day and three singles and two doubles played on the next day. The teams that win their respective zone will earn a place in the final tournament to be held in Bangkok.

Indonesia were the champions of the last Thomas Cup, therefore the team automatically qualified for the inter-zone play-offs. Thailand also qualified for the final tournament as hosts.

=== Qualified teams ===
Country	Qualified as	Qualified on	Final appearance
Thailand	1976 Thomas Cup hosts	13 July 1975	5th
Indonesia	1973 Thomas Cup winners	3 June 1973	7th
Malaysia	Asian Zone winners	3 April 1976	8th
Denmark	European Zone winners	21 March 1976	10th
Canada	American Zone winners	15 February 1976	3rd
New Zealand	Australasian Zone winners	27 September 1975	2nd

== Asian Zone ==
=== Bracket ===
First round
Hong Kong
Bye
Japan
Bye
South Korea
Bye
Bye
Bye
July 1975
Pakistan	w/o
Burma
India
Bye
27 August 1975 – Colombo
Sri Lanka	0
Singapore	9
Bye
Malaysia

Second round
20 September 1975 – Tokyo
Hong Kong	0
Japan	9
South Korea
Bye
29 November 1975 – Lahore
Pakistan	4
India	5
5 December 1975 – Singapore
Singapore	1
Malaysia	8

Semi-finals
24 January 1976 – Tokyo
Japan	9
South Korea	0
14 February 1976 – Ludhiana
India	4
Malaysia	5

Final
2 April 1976 – Kuala Lumpur
Japan	3
Malaysia	6

=== First round ===
Singapore
9
Colombo, Sri Lanka
27–28 August 1975

Sri Lanka
0

			1	2	3
1	(Singapore) (Sri Lanka)	Tan Ban Chew; Ravi Kuruppu	15; 6	15; 4
2	(Singapore) (Sri Lanka)	Ng Chor Yau; Ajith Perera	15; 3	15; 5
3	(Singapore) (Sri Lanka)	Tan Eng Han / Yeo Ah Seng; Ravi Kuruppu / Rohan Perera	15; 2	15; 4
4	(Singapore) (Sri Lanka)	Kok Peng Hon / Lee Ah Ngo; Lal Anthonis / Sumith Guruge	15; 1	15; 3
5	(Singapore) (Sri Lanka)	Tan Ban Chew; Ajith Perera	15; 2	18; 13
6	(Singapore) (Sri Lanka)	Ng Chor Yau; Ravi Kuruppu	15; 3	18; 9
7	(Singapore) (Sri Lanka)	Lee Ah Ngo; Rohan Perera	15; 0	15; 11
8	(Singapore) (Sri Lanka)	Tan Eng Han / Yeo Ah Seng; Lal Anthonis / Sumith Guruge	15; 4	15; 1
9	(Singapore) (Sri Lanka)	Kok Peng Hon / Lee Ah Ngo; Ravi Kuruppu / Rohan Perera	15; 1	15; 3

=== Second round ===
Japan
9
Tokyo, Japan
20–21 September 1975

Hong Kong
0

			1	2	3
1	(Japan) (Hong Kong)	Ippei Kojima; Yang Mei Liang	15; 5	15; 6
2	(Japan) (Hong Kong)	Kinji Zeniya; Wong Man Hing	15; 3	15; 6
3	(Japan) (Hong Kong)	Nobutaka Ikeda / Shoichi Toganoo; Haw Wan Cheong / Wang Hung Ping	15; 8	15; 11
4	(Japan) (Hong Kong)	Yoshitaka Iino / Masao Tsuchida; Chen Kwok Ming / Wong Man Hing	15; 6	10; 15	15; 6
5	(Japan) (Hong Kong)	Kinji Zeniya; Yang Mei Liang	15; 4	18; 16
6	(Japan) (Hong Kong)	Ippei Kojima; Wong Man Hing	15; 4	18; 16
7	(Japan) (Hong Kong)	Masao Tsuchida; Haw Wan Cheong	16; 8	9; 6
8	(Japan) (Hong Kong)	Nobutaka Ikeda / Shoichi Toganoo; Chen Kwok Ming / Wong Man Hing	17; 6	15; 10
9	(Japan) (Hong Kong)	Yoshitaka Iino / Masao Tsuchida; Haw Wan Cheong / Wang Hung Ping	15; 5	15; 6

India
5
Lahore, Pakistan
29–30 November 1975

Pakistan
4

			1	2	3
1	(India) (Pakistan)	Davinder Ahuja; Javed Iqbal	5; 15	8; 15
2	(India) (Pakistan)	Prakash Padukone; Hassan Shaheed	15; 13	15; 8
3	(India) (Pakistan)	Prakash Padukone / Asif Parpia; Hassan Shaheed / Tariq Wadood	15; 9	15; 6
4	(India) (Pakistan)	Partho Ganguli / Suresh Goel; Javed Iqbal / Anwar Saeed	15; 11	15; 6
5	(India) (Pakistan)	Prakash Padukone; Javed Iqbal	15; 12	18; 9
6	(India) (Pakistan)	Davinder Ahuja; Hassan Shaheed	10; 15	12; 15
7	(India) (Pakistan)	Suresh Goel; Tariq Wadood	15; 9	5; 15	10; 15
8	(India) (Pakistan)	Prakash Padukone / Asif Parpia; Javed Iqbal / Anwar Saeed	15; 11	15; 4
9	(India) (Pakistan)	Partho Ganguli / Suresh Goel; Hassan Shaheed / Tariq Wadood	10; 15	11; 15

Malaysia
8
Singapore
5–6 December 1975

Singapore
1

			1	2	3
1	(Malaysia) (Singapore)	Saw Swee Leong; Ng Chor Yau	6; 15	15; 8	15; 5
2	(Malaysia) (Singapore)	Moo Foot Lian; Lee Ah Ngo	15; 10	6; 15	15; 8
3	(Malaysia) (Singapore)	James Selvaraj / Lim Cheng Hoe; Tan Eng Han / Yeo Ah Seng	10; 15	16; 18
4	(Malaysia) (Singapore)	Cheah Hong Chong / Dominic Soong; Kok Peng Hon / Lee Ah Ngo	15; 7	15; 10
5	(Malaysia) (Singapore)	Saw Swee Leong; Lee Ah Ngo	15; 7	15; 5
6	(Malaysia) (Singapore)	Moo Foot Lian; Ng Chor Yau	15; 12	15; 9
7	(Malaysia) (Singapore)	Cheah Hong Chong; Tan Ban Chew	5; 15	15; 3	4; 8	retired
8	(Malaysia) (Singapore)	Cheah Hong Chong / Dominic Soong; Tan Eng Han / Yeo Ah Seng	12; 15	15; 10	15; 6
9	(Malaysia) (Singapore)	James Selvaraj / Lim Cheng Hoe; Kok Peng Hon / Ng Chor Yau	15; 5	15; 13

=== Semi-finals ===
Japan
9
Tokyo, Japan
24–25 January 1976

South Korea
0

			1	2	3
1	(Japan) (South Korea)	Kinji Zeniya; Han Sung-ki	15; 6	15; 1
2	(Japan) (South Korea)	Ippei Kojima; Lee Eun-ku	15; 9	18; 13
3	(Japan) (South Korea)	Yoshitaka Iino / Masao Tsuchida; Han Sung-ki / Kim Bong-sub	15; 4	15; 2
4	(Japan) (South Korea)	Nobutaka Ikeda / Shoichi Toganoo; Kim Eui-gon / Lee Ok-hyun	15; 3	15; 1
5	(Japan) (South Korea)	Kinji Zeniya; Lee Eun-ku	15; 4	18; 4
6	(Japan) (South Korea)	Ippei Kojima; Han Sung-ki	15; 4	18; 8
7	(Japan) (South Korea)	Masao Tsuchida; Lee Ok-hyun	16; 3	9; 5
8	(Japan) (South Korea)	Nobutaka Ikeda / Shoichi Toganoo; Han Sung-ki / Kim Bong-sub	15; 5	15; 8
9	(Japan) (South Korea)	Yoshitaka Iino / Masao Tsuchida; Kim Eui-gon / Lee Ok-hyun	15; 2	15; 1

Malaysia
5
Ludhiana, India
14–15 February 1976

India
4

			1	2	3
1	(Malaysia) (India)	Saw Swee Leong; Prakash Padukone	4; 15	3; 15
2	(Malaysia) (India)	Phua Ah Hua; Dinesh Khanna	15; 11	5; 15	13; 18
3	(Malaysia) (India)	James Selvaraj / Moo Foot Lian; Prakash Padukone / Asif Parpia	5; 15	15; 12	12; 15
4	(Malaysia) (India)	Cheah Hong Chong / Dominic Soong; Davinder Ahuja / Partho Ganguli	15; 6	15; 9
5	(Malaysia) (India)	Saw Swee Leong; Dinesh Khanna	17; 15	17; 15
6	(Malaysia) (India)	Phua Ah Hua; Prakash Padukone	4; 15	8; 15
7	(Malaysia) (India)	James Selvaraj; Iqbal Manindergi	15; 2	15; 8
8	(Malaysia) (India)	Cheah Hong Chong / Dominic Soong; Prakash Padukone / Asif Parpia	17; 14	15; 18	15; 7
9	(Malaysia) (India)	James Selvaraj / Moo Foot Lian; Davinder Ahuja / Partho Ganguli	18; 16	15; 7

=== Final ===
Malaysia
6
Kuala Lumpur, Malaysia
2–3 April 1976

Japan
3

			1	2	3
1	(Malaysia) (Japan)	Saw Swee Leong; Kinji Zeniya	17; 14	15; 6
2	(Malaysia) (Japan)	Phua Ah Hua; Ippei Kojima	15; 11	6; 15	15; 10
3	(Malaysia) (Japan)	James Selvaraj / Moo Foot Lian; Nobutaka Ikeda / Shoichi Toganoo	16; 18	15; 8	7; 15
4	(Malaysia) (Japan)	Cheah Hong Chong / Dominic Soong; Yoshitaka Iino / Masao Tsuchida	7; 15	15; 4	18; 15
5	(Malaysia) (Japan)	Saw Swee Leong; Ippei Kojima	15; 11	16; 17	11; 15
6	(Malaysia) (Japan)	Phua Ah Hua; Kinji Zeniya	8; 15	15; 3	15; 6
7	(Malaysia) (Japan)	James Selvaraj; Masao Tsuchida	11; 15	15; 10	15; 18
8	(Malaysia) (Japan)	James Selvaraj / Moo Foot Lian; Yoshitaka Iino / Masao Tsuchida	15; 5	18; 17
9	(Malaysia) (Japan)	Moo Foot Lian / Dominic Soong; Nobutaka Ikeda / Shoichi Toganoo	15; 5	15; 6

== American Zone ==
=== Bracket ===
Semi-finals
24 January 1976 – Manhattan Beach
Canada	6
United States	3
13 December 1975 – Lima
Mexico	8
Peru	1

Final
14 February 1976 – Mexico City
Canada	6
Mexico	3

=== Semi-finals ===
Mexico
8
Lima, Peru
13–14 December 1975

Peru
1

			1	2	3
1	(Mexico) (Peru)	José Icaza; Guillermo Zavala	15; 4	15; 5
2	(Mexico) (Peru)	Roy Díaz González; Ricardo Newton	15; 5	15; 2
3	(Mexico) (Peru)	Ricardo Jaramillo / Victor Jaramillo; Federico Valdez / Germán Valdez	15; 8	15; 5
4	(Mexico) (Peru)	Roy Díaz González / Jorge Palazuelos; Ricardo Newton / Guillermo Zavala	8; 15	15; 12	13; 18
5	(Mexico) (Peru)	Roy Díaz González; Guillermo Zavala	15; 12	15; 1
6	(Mexico) (Peru)	José Icaza; Ricardo Newton	15; 4	12; 15	15; 4
7	(Mexico) (Peru)	Victor Jaramillo; Federico Valdez	15; 12	15; 5
8	(Mexico) (Peru)	Ricardo Jaramillo / Victor Jaramillo; Ricardo Newton / Guillermo Zavala	17; 16	15; 8
9	(Mexico) (Peru)	Roy Díaz González / Jorge Palazuelos; Federico Valdez / Germán Valdez	15; 7	18; 15

Canada
6
Manhattan Beach, United States
24–25 January 1976

United States
3

			1	2	3
1	(Canada) (United States)	Jamie McKee; Mike Walker	13; 15	15; 8	15; 2
2	(Canada) (United States)	Wayne Macdonnell; Charles Coakley	15; 12	15; 11
3	(Canada) (United States)	Raphi Kanchanaraphi / Channarong Ratanaseangsuang; Bob Dickie / Gary Higgins	17; 18	8; 15
4	(Canada) (United States)	David Gibson / Jamie McKee; Jim Poole / Mike Walker	5; 15	15; 8	6; 15
5	(Canada) (United States)	Jamie McKee; Charles Coakley	13; 15	15; 3	15; 5
6	(Canada) (United States)	Wayne Macdonnell; Mike Walker	15; 8	15; 6
7	(Canada) (United States)	Mike Epstein; Mike Adams	10; 15	15; 6	15; 4
8	(Canada) (United States)	David Gibson / Jamie McKee; Bob Dickie / Gary Higgins	8; 15	12; 15
9	(Canada) (United States)	Raphi Kanchanaraphi / Channarong Ratanaseangsuang; Jim Poole / Mike Walker	15; 5	15; 10

=== Final ===
Canada
6
Mexico City, Mexico
14–15 February 1976

Mexico
3

			1	2	3
1	(Canada) (Mexico)	Mike Epstein; Roy Díaz González	9; 15	10; 15
2	(Canada) (Mexico)	Jamie McKee; José Icaza	15; 3	15; 11
3	(Canada) (Mexico)	Raphi Kanchanaraphi / Channarong Ratanaseangsuang; Ricardo Jaramillo / Victor Jaramillo	15; 2	15; 4
4	(Canada) (Mexico)	Jamie McKee / Jamie Paulson; Roy Díaz González / Jorge Palazuelos	12; 15	15; 11	15; 6
5	(Canada) (Mexico)	Jamie McKee; Roy Díaz González	2; 15	9; 15
6	(Canada) (Mexico)	Mike Epstein; José Icaza	15; 12	15; 2
7	(Canada) (Mexico)	Wayne Macdonnell; Victor Jaramillo	13; 15	15; 18
8	(Canada) (Mexico)	Raphi Kanchanaraphi / Channarong Ratanaseangsuang; Roy Díaz González / Jorge Palazuelos	15; 12	15; 1
9	(Canada) (Mexico)	Jamie McKee / Jamie Paulson; Ricardo Jaramillo / Victor Jaramillo	15; 5	15; 3

== European Zone ==
=== Bracket ===
First round
Netherlands
Bye
4 November 1975 – Edinburgh
Scotland	0
England	9
Denmark
Bye
Bye
Bye
Finland
Bye
West Germany
Bye
Bye
Bye
Bye
Sweden

Second round
2 December 1975 – Geldrop
Netherlands	0
England	9
Denmark
Bye
22 November 1975 – Helsinki
Finland	0
West Germany	9
Bye
Sweden

Semi-finals
31 January 1976 – Copenhagen
England	3
Denmark	6
3 January 1976 – Mariestad
West Germany	1
Sweden	8

Final
20 March 1976 – Copenhagen
Denmark	5
Sweden	4

=== First round ===
England
9
Edinburgh, Scotland
4–5 November 1975

Scotland
0

			1	2	3
1	(England) (Scotland)	Ray Stevens; George Forbes	15; 4	15; 2
2	(England) (Scotland)	Paul Whetnall; Nicol McCloy	15; 7	15; 4
3	(England) (Scotland)	David Eddy / Eddy Sutton; Fraser Gow / Robert S. McCoig	15; 11	15; 8
4	(England) (Scotland)	Ray Stevens / Mike Tredgett; Jim Ansari / Billy Gilliland	15; 5	15; 6
5	(England) (Scotland)	Paul Whetnall; George Forbes	15; 11	17; 16
6	(England) (Scotland)	Ray Stevens; Nicol McCloy	15; 0	15; 4
7	(England) (Scotland)	Derek Talbot; Robert S. McCoig	15; 5	15; 6
8	(England) (Scotland)	David Eddy / Eddy Sutton; Jim Ansari / Billy Gilliland	15; 13	18; 15
9	(England) (Scotland)	Ray Stevens / Mike Tredgett; Fraser Gow / Robert S. McCoig	15; 12	15; 10

=== Second round ===
West Germany
9
Helsinki, Finland
22–23 November 1975

Finland
0

			1	2	3
1	(West Germany) (Finland)	Roland Maywald; Jouko Degerth	15; 12	15; 5
2	(West Germany) (Finland)	Michael Schnaase; Lars-Henrik Nybergh	15; 6	15; 7
3	(West Germany) (Finland)	Karl-Heinz Garbers / Gerhard Kucki; Dick Monthén / Mårten Segercrantz	15; 1	15; 6
4	(West Germany) (Finland)	Willi Braun / Roland Maywald; Jouko Degerth / Lars-Henrik Nybergh	15; 2	15; 9
5	(West Germany) (Finland)	Roland Maywald; Lars-Henrik Nybergh	18; 14	15; 12
6	(West Germany) (Finland)	Michael Schnaase; Jouko Degerth	15; 7	15; 7
7	(West Germany) (Finland)	Torsten Winter; Carl-Johan Nybergh	15; 3	15; 11
8	(West Germany) (Finland)	Willi Braun / Roland Maywald; Dick Monthén / Mårten Segercrantz	15; 5	15; 10
9	(West Germany) (Finland)	Karl-Heinz Garbers / Gerhard Kucki; Jouko Degerth / Lars-Henrik Nybergh	15; 6	15; 18	15; 10

England
9
Geldrop, Netherlands
2–3 December 1975

Netherlands
0

			1	2	3
1	(England) (Netherlands)	Paul Whetnall; Rob Ridder	15; 12	15; 7
2	(England) (Netherlands)	Derek Talbot; Piet Ridder	15; 7	18; 15
3	(England) (Netherlands)	Ray Stevens / Mike Tredgett; Boudewijn Ridder / Rob Ridder	15; 3	15; 9
4	(England) (Netherlands)	David Eddy / Eddy Sutton; Piet Ridder / Clemens Wortel	15; 6	15; 2
5	(England) (Netherlands)	Paul Whetnall; Piet Ridder	15; 3	15; 4
6	(England) (Netherlands)	Derek Talbot; Rob Ridder	15; 4	15; 8
7	(England) (Netherlands)	Ray Stevens; Clemens Wortel	15; 3	15; 5
8	(England) (Netherlands)	David Eddy / Eddy Sutton; Boudewijn Ridder / Rob Ridder	15; 9	15; 8
9	(England) (Netherlands)	Ray Stevens / Mike Tredgett; Guus de Vogel / Guus van der Vlugt	15; 4	15; 1

=== Semi-finals ===
Denmark
6
Copenhagen, Denmark
31 January – 1 February 1976

England
3

			1	2	3
1	(Denmark) (England)	Svend Pri; Ray Stevens	11; 15	15; 12	11; 15
2	(Denmark) (England)	Flemming Delfs; Paul Whetnall	15; 11	15; 6
3	(Denmark) (England)	Poul Petersen / Per Walsøe; David Eddy / Eddy Sutton	16; 18	10; 15
4	(Denmark) (England)	Flemming Delfs / Elo Hansen; Ray Stevens / Mike Tredgett	12; 15	15; 8	17; 14
5	(Denmark) (England)	Elo Hansen; Derek Talbot	15; 6	10; 15	15; 11
6	(Denmark) (England)	Svend Pri; Paul Whetnall	18; 13	15; 7
7	(Denmark) (England)	Flemming Delfs; Ray Stevens	15; 11	10; 15	15; 3
8	(Denmark) (England)	Flemming Delfs / Elo Hansen; David Eddy / Eddy Sutton	15; 8	15; 12
9	(Denmark) (England)	Poul Petersen / Per Walsøe; Ray Stevens / Mike Tredgett	15; 9	10; 15	11; 15

Sweden
8
Mariestad, Sweden
3–4 January 1976

West Germany
1

			1	2	3
1	(Sweden) (West Germany)	Thomas Kihlström; Michael Schnaase	15; 6	15; 1
2	(Sweden) (West Germany)	Sture Johnsson; Wolfgang Bochow	15; 7	15; 5
3	(Sweden) (West Germany)	Bengt Fröman / Thomas Kihlström; Willi Braun / Roland Maywald	9; 15	15; 9	15; 9
4	(Sweden) (West Germany)	Sture Johnsson / Claes Nordin; Karl-Heinz Garbers / Gerhard Kucki	3; 15	15; 9	13; 15
5	(Sweden) (West Germany)	Sture Johnsson; Michael Schnaase	15; 4	15; 2
6	(Sweden) (West Germany)	Thomas Kihlström; Wolfgang Bochow	15; 7	8; 15	15; 13
7	(Sweden) (West Germany)	Kurt Johnsson; Roland Maywald	4; 15	15; 7	15; 6
8	(Sweden) (West Germany)	Bengt Fröman / Thomas Kihlström; Karl-Heinz Garbers / Gerhard Kucki	15; 11	15; 3
9	(Sweden) (West Germany)	Sture Johnsson / Claes Nordin; Willi Braun / Roland Maywald	15; 8	16; 18	15; 10

=== Final ===
Denmark
5
Copenhagen, Denmark
20–21 March 1976

Sweden
4

			1	2	3
1	(Denmark) (Sweden)	Flemming Delfs; Sture Johnsson	15; 12	6; 15	16; 17
2	(Denmark) (Sweden)	Svend Pri; Thomas Kihlström	12; 15	15; 4	15; 6
3	(Denmark) (Sweden)	Flemming Delfs / Elo Hansen; Matts Andersson / Lars Wengberg	15; 6	15; 9
4	(Denmark) (Sweden)	Jesper Helledie / Jørgen Mortensen; Bengt Fröman / Thomas Kihlström	9; 15	8; 15
5	(Denmark) (Sweden)	Svend Pri; Sture Johnsson	15; 11	15; 9
6	(Denmark) (Sweden)	Flemming Delfs; Thomas Kihlström	8; 15	8; 15
7	(Denmark) (Sweden)	Elo Hansen; Bruno Wackfelt	11; 15	15; 6	8; 15
8	(Denmark) (Sweden)	Flemming Delfs / Elo Hansen; Bengt Fröman / Thomas Kihlström	15; 12	11; 15	15; 6
9	(Denmark) (Sweden)	Jesper Helledie / Jørgen Mortensen; Matts Andersson / Lars Wengberg	15; 8	15; 11

== Australasian Zone ==
=== Bracket ===
Semi-finals
August 1975 – Perth
Australia	w/o
Iran
July 1975
New Zealand	w/o
Republic оf China

Final
26 September 1975 – Hobart
Australia	0
New Zealand	9

=== Semi-finals ===
In August 1975, Australia and Iran were due to compete for a place in the Australasian zone final in Perth but Iran later withdrew from the event. New Zealand also qualified for the Australasian zone final following the withdrawal of the Republic of China.

=== Final ===
New Zealand
9
Hobart, Australia
26–27 September 1975

Australia
0

			1	2	3
1	(New Zealand) (Australia)	Bryan Purser; Peter Cooper	15; 13	15; 11
2	(New Zealand) (Australia)	Ross Livingston; John Clancy	15; 3	15; 11
3	(New Zealand) (Australia)	Warren Johns / Ross Livingston; Peter Cooper / Chris Hardwick	9; 15	15; 1	15; 7
4	(New Zealand) (Australia)	Bryan Purser / Richard Purser; Cuthbert Berenger / John Clancy	15; 4	15; 9
5	(New Zealand) (Australia)	Ross Livingston; Peter Cooper	18; 16	15; 6
6	(New Zealand) (Australia)	Bryan Purser; John Clancy	11; 15	15; 7	15; 9
7	(New Zealand) (Australia)	Richard Purser; Cuthbert Berenger	18; 5	15; 7
8	(New Zealand) (Australia)	Bryan Purser / Richard Purser; Peter Cooper / Chris Hardwick	18; 14	15; 10
9	(New Zealand) (Australia)	Warren Johns / Ross Livingston; Cuthbert Berenger / John Clancy	15; 5	15; 9
