= 1976 Asian Badminton Championships – Men's team =

Badminton championship in Hyderabad, India

Men's team at the 1976 Asian Badminton Championships
- Venue: Lal Bahadur Shastri Indoor Stadium
- Location: Hyderabad, India
- Dates: 30 October – 3 November 1976

The men's team tournament at the 1976 Asian Badminton Championships, also known as the Tunku Abdul Rahman Cup (Malay: Piala Tunku Abdul Rahman) took place from 30 October to 3 November 1976 at the Lal Bahadur Shastri Indoor Stadium in Hyderabad, India. A total of 13 teams competed in this event. South Korea and Pakistan withdrew from the event.

== Results ==
=== Bracket ===
Round of 16
Indonesia	5
Nepal	0
Malaysia	3
Bangladesh	2
Sri Lanka	1
Burma	4
Japan	3
India	2
Thailand	5
Iran	0
Singapore	w/o
South Korea
Pakistan
China	w/o

Quarter-finals
Indonesia	5
Hong Kong	0
Malaysia	3
Burma	2
Japan	3
Thailand	2
Singapore	0
China	5

Semi-finals
Indonesia	3
Malaysia	2
Japan	1
China	4

Final
Indonesia	3
China	2
Third place
Malaysia	2
Japan	3

=== Round of 16 ===
Indonesia
5
Lal Bahadur Shastri Indoor Stadium
30 October 1976

Nepal
0

			1	2	3
1	(Indonesia) (Nepal)	Iie Sumirat; Kishor Bahadur Singha	15; 8	15; 0
2	(Indonesia) (Nepal)	Liem Swie King; Rajendra Bahadur Bista	15; 0	15; 2
3	(Indonesia) (Nepal)	Ade Chandra / Tjun Tjun; Prem Pandey / Uday Kumar Shrestha	15; 1	15; 0
4	(Indonesia) (Nepal)	Liem Swie King; Kishor Bahadur Singha	15; 3	15; 4
5	(Indonesia) (Nepal)	Iie Sumirat; Rajendra Bahadur Bista	15; 1	15; 5

Malaysia
3
Lal Bahadur Shastri Indoor Stadium
30 October 1976

Bangladesh
2

			1	2	3
1	(Malaysia) (Bangladesh)	Saw Swee Leong; Akhtar Uzzaman	15; 2	15; 3
2	(Malaysia) (Bangladesh)	James Selvaraj; Mozammul Haque	15; 1	15; 1
3	(Malaysia) (Bangladesh)	Ho Khim Soon / Lim Cheng Hoe; Mozammul Haque / Shamsul Islam	15; 4	15; 5
4	(Malaysia) (Bangladesh)	James Selvaraj; Akhtar Uzzaman				w/o
5	(Malaysia) (Bangladesh)	Saw Swee Leong; Mozammul Haque				w/o

Burma
4
Lal Bahadur Shastri Indoor Stadium
30 October 1976

Sri Lanka
1

			1	2	3
1	(Myanmar) (Sri Lanka)	Ko Gyi; K. D. Nallatamby	15; 7	13; 18	15; 11
2	(Myanmar) (Sri Lanka)	Wai Nyunt; Ravi Kuruppu	15; 8	15; 12
3	(Myanmar) (Sri Lanka)	San Maung / Maung Maung; L. R. Ariyananda / B. Gunawardena	15; 7	15; 3
4	(Myanmar) (Sri Lanka)	Wai Nyunt; K. D. Nallatamby				w/o
5	(Myanmar) (Sri Lanka)	Ko Gyi; Ravi Kuruppu	15; 8	15; 10

Japan
3
Lal Bahadur Shastri Indoor Stadium
30 October 1976

India
2

			1	2	3
1	(Japan) (India)	Masao Tsuchida; Davinder Ahuja	15; 6	15; 2
2	(Japan) (India)	Kinji Zeniya; Prakash Padukone	5; 15	13; 15
3	(Japan) (India)	Nobutaka Ikeda / Shoichi Toganoo; Raman Ghosh / P. G. Chengappa	18; 15	15; 12
4	(Japan) (India)	Kinji Zeniya; Davinder Ahuja	15; 5	11; 15	15; 5
5	(Japan) (India)	Masao Tsuchida; Prakash Padukone	15; 11	0; 15	0; 15

Thailand
5
Lal Bahadur Shastri Indoor Stadium
30 October 1976

Iran
0

			1	2	3
1	(Thailand) (Iran)	Udom Luangpetcharaporn; Morteza Maddahi	15; 4	15; 4
2	(Thailand) (Iran)	Bandid Jaiyen; Gholam-Hossein Yazadanpanah	15; 3	15; 3
3	(Thailand) (Iran)	Jiamsak Panitchaikul / Surapong Suharitdamrong; Sirous Aflatoun / Mohsen Zamani	15; 1	15; 3
4	(Thailand) (Iran)	Bandid Jaiyen; Morteza Maddahi	15; 3	15; 4
5	(Thailand) (Iran)	Udom Luangpetcharaporn; Gholam-Hossein Yazadanpanah	15; 5	15; 8

=== Quarter-finals ===
Indonesia
5
Lal Bahadur Shastri Indoor Stadium
31 October 1976

Hong Kong
0

			1	2	3
1	(Indonesia) (Hong Kong)	Iie Sumirat; Wong Man Hing	15; 6	15; 3
2	(Indonesia) (Hong Kong)	Liem Swie King; Yang Mei Liang	15; 8	15; 7
3	(Indonesia) (Hong Kong)	Ade Chandra / Tjun Tjun; Fu Hon Ping / Haw Wan Cheong	15; 8	15; 9
4	(Indonesia) (Hong Kong)	Iie Sumirat; Yang Mei Liang	15; 8	15; 7
5	(Indonesia) (Hong Kong)	Liem Swie King; Wong Man Hing	15; 0	15; 0

Malaysia
3
Lal Bahadur Shastri Indoor Stadium
31 October 1976

Burma
2

			1	2	3
1	(Malaysia) (Myanmar)	James Selvaraj; Wai Nyunt	15; 7	15; 4
2	(Malaysia) (Myanmar)	Saw Swee Leong; Ko Gyi	15; 6	15; 4
3	(Malaysia) (Myanmar)	Ho Khim Soon / Lim Cheng Hoe; Ko Gyi / Maung Maung	15; 9	15; 11
4	(Malaysia) (Myanmar)	James Selvaraj; Ko Gyi				w/o
5	(Malaysia) (Myanmar)	Saw Swee Leong; Wai Nyunt				w/o

Japan
5
Lal Bahadur Shastri Indoor Stadium
31 October 1976

Thailand
0

			1	2	3
1	(Japan) (Thailand)	Masao Tsuchida; Bandid Jaiyen	15; 10	11; 15	15; 12
2	(Japan) (Thailand)	Kinji Zeniya; Surapong Suharitdamrong	15; 11	15; 5
3	(Japan) (Thailand)	Nobutaka Ikeda / Shoichi Toganoo; Udom Luangpetcharaporn / Jiamsak Panitchaikul	15; 5	15; 6
4	(Japan) (Thailand)	Masao Tsuchida; Surapong Suharitdamrong				w/o
5	(Japan) (Thailand)	Kinji Zeniya; Bandid Jaiyen				w/o

China
5
Lal Bahadur Shastri Indoor Stadium
31 October 1976

Singapore
0

			1	2	3
1	(China) (Singapore)	Tang Xianhu; Ahmad Abu Bakar Baghrib	15; 8	15; 2
2	(China) (Singapore)	Luan Jin; Chin Soon Chye	15; 7	15; 8
3	(China) (Singapore)	Sun Zhian / Yao Ximing; Tan Eng Han / Tan Khee Wee	15; 8	15; 5
4	(China) (Singapore)	Tang Xianhu; Chin Soon Chye	12; 15	15; 5	15; 3
5	(China) (Singapore)	Luan Jin; Ahmad Abu Bakar Baghrib	15; 4	3; 15	15; 6

=== Semi-finals ===
China
4
Lal Bahadur Shastri Indoor Stadium
2 November 1976

Japan
1

			1	2	3
1	(China) (Japan)	Fang Kaixiang; Masao Tsuchida	15; 6	15; 4
2	(China) (Japan)	Yu Yaodong; Kinji Zeniya	15; 2	11; 15	13; 18
3	(China) (Japan)	Chen Tianxiang / Sun Zhian; Yoshitaka Iino / Shoichi Toganoo	15; 12	17; 14
4	(China) (Japan)	Fang Kaixiang; Kinji Zeniya	15; 5	15; 12
5	(China) (Japan)	Yu Yaodong; Masao Tsuchida				w/o

Indonesia
3
Lal Bahadur Shastri Indoor Stadium
2 November 1976

Malaysia
2

			1	2	3
1	(Indonesia) (Malaysia)	Iie Sumirat; James Selvaraj	15; 1	15; 6
2	(Indonesia) (Malaysia)	Liem Swie King; Saw Swee Leong	15; 8	15; 5
3	(Indonesia) (Malaysia)	Ade Chandra / Tjun Tjun; Ho Khim Soon / Lim Cheng Hoe	15; 8	15; 7
4	(Indonesia) (Malaysia)	Iie Sumirat; Saw Swee Leong				w/o
5	(Indonesia) (Malaysia)	Liem Swie King; James Selvaraj				w/o

=== Third place ===
Malaysia
2
Lal Bahadur Shastri Indoor Stadium
3 November 1976

Japan
3

			1	2	3
1	(Malaysia) (Japan)	James Selvaraj; Masao Tsuchida	9; 15	3; 15
2	(Malaysia) (Japan)	Saw Swee Leong; Kinji Zeniya	17; 15	15; 9
3	(Malaysia) (Japan)	Ho Khim Soon / Lim Cheng Hoe; Yoshitaka Iino / Shoichi Toganoo	2; 15	8; 15
4	(Malaysia) (Japan)	James Selvaraj; Kinji Zeniya				w/o
5	(Malaysia) (Japan)	Saw Swee Leong; Masao Tsuchida	8; 15	15; 0	10; 15

=== Final ===
Indonesia
3
Lal Bahadur Shastri Indoor Stadium
3 November 1976

China
2

			1	2	3
1	(Indonesia) (China)	Liem Swie King; Fang Kaixiang	15; 7	9; 15	15; 8
2	(Indonesia) (China)	Iie Sumirat; Luan Jin	15; 6	6; 15	6; 15
3	(Indonesia) (China)	Ade Chandra / Tjun Tjun; Chen Tianxiang / Sun Zhian	15; 10	15; 13
4	(Indonesia) (China)	Iie Sumirat; Fang Kaixiang	11; 15	8; 15
5	(Indonesia) (China)	Liem Swie King; Luan Jin	15; 9	15; 11
