= Badminton at the 1977 SEA Games – Men's team =

Badminton – Men's team at the 1977 SEA Games
- Venue: Stadium Negara
- Dates: 19–20 November 1977
- Nations: 4

Medalists
gold medal	Indonesia (INA)
silver medal	Thailand (THA)
bronze medal	Malaysia (MAL)

The men's team badminton tournament at the 1977 SEA Games was held from 19 to 20 November 1977 at Stadium Negara in Kuala Lumpur, Malaysia. The defending champions were Thailand who beat Malaysia 3–1 in the last edition of the Games.

== Schedule ==
All times are Malaysia Standard Time (UTC+07:30)

Date	Time	Event
Saturday, 19 November	19:30	Semi-finals
Sunday, 20 November	09:00	Semi-finals
Sunday, 20 November	14:00	Bronze medal match
Sunday, 20 November	19:00	Gold medal match

== Bracket ==
Semi-finals
Malaysia (MAL)	1
Thailand (THA)	3
Singapore (SIN)	0
Indonesia (INA)	4

Gold medal match
Thailand (THA)	1
Indonesia (INA)	3
Bronze medal match
Malaysia (MAL)	3
Singapore (SIN)	0

== Semi-finals ==
=== Indonesia vs Singapore ===
Indonesia
4
Stadium Negara
19 November 1977, 19:30

Singapore
0

			1	2	3
1	(Indonesia) (Singapore)	Liem Swie King; Wong Shoon Keat	15; 2	15; 0
2	(Indonesia) (Singapore)	Dhany Sartika; Sulaiman Zaini	15; 3	15; 2
3	(Indonesia) (Singapore)	Tjun Tjun / Johan Wahjudi; Tan Eng Han / Kok Peng Hon	15; 7	15; 2
4	(Indonesia) (Singapore)	Ade Chandra / Christian Hadinata; Lee Ah Ngo / Wong Shoon Keat	15; 10	15; 8
5	(Indonesia) (Singapore)	Christian Hadinata; Lee Ah Ngo				not played

=== Malaysia vs Thailand ===
Malaysia
1
Stadium Negara
20 November 1977, 09:00

Thailand
3

			1	2	3
1	(Malaysia) (Thailand)	Saw Swee Leong; Bandid Jaiyen	15; 6	15; 8
2	(Malaysia) (Thailand)	Moo Foot Lian; Surapong Suharitdamrong	13; 15	15; 11	8; 15
3	(Malaysia) (Thailand)	Koay Kar Lin / Dominic Soong; Pichai Kongsirithavorn / Preecha Sopajaree	15; 10	6; 15	9; 15
4	(Malaysia) (Thailand)	Lim Cheng Hoe / James Selvaraj; Bandid Jaiyen / Surapong Suharitdamrong	2; 15	2; 15
5	(Malaysia) (Thailand)	James Selvaraj; Pichai Kongsirithavorn				not played

== Bronze medal match ==
=== Malaysia vs Singapore ===
Malaysia
3
Stadium Negara
20 November 1977, 14:00

Singapore
0

			1	2	3
1	(Malaysia) (Singapore)	Saw Swee Leong; Sulaiman Zaini	15; 11	15; 0
2	(Malaysia) (Singapore)	James Selvaraj; Tan Ban Chew	15; 4	15; 2
3	(Malaysia) (Singapore)	Koay Kar Lin / Dominic Soong; Tan Eng Han / Kok Peng Hon	10; 15	15; 5	15; 12
4	(Malaysia) (Singapore)	Lim Cheng Hoe / James Selvaraj; Lee Ah Ngo / Wong Shoon Keat				not played
5	(Malaysia) (Singapore)	Moo Foot Lian; Lee Ah Ngo				not played

== Gold medal match ==
=== Indonesia vs Thailand ===
Indonesia
3
Stadium Negara
16 December 1977, 19:00

Thailand
1

			1	2	3
1	(Indonesia) (Thailand)	Liem Swie King; Surapong Suharitdamrong	15; 4	15; 4
2	(Indonesia) (Thailand)	Dhany Sartika; Bandid Jaiyen	3; 15	5; 15
3	(Indonesia) (Thailand)	Tjun Tjun / Johan Wahjudi; Pichai Kongsirithavorn / Preecha Sopajaree	15; 6	15; 3
4	(Indonesia) (Thailand)	Ade Chandra / Christian Hadinata; Bandid Jaiyen / Surapong Suharitdamrong	15; 8	15; 9
5	(Indonesia) (Thailand)	Christian Hadinata; Pichai Kongsirithavorn				not played

== See also ==
- Individual event tournament
- Women's team tournament
