= 1976 Thomas Cup squads =

This article lists the squads for the 1976 Thomas Cup participating teams. The age listed for each player is on 25 May 1976 which was the first day of the tournament.

== Teams ==
=== Canada ===
Six players represented Canada in the 1976 Thomas Cup.

Name	DoB/Age
Jamie McKee	1951 (aged 24–25)
John Czich	1952 (aged 23–24)
Raphi Kanchanaraphi	6 November 1936 (aged 39)
Channarong Ratanaseangsuang	1939 (aged 36–37)
Lucio Fabris	7 November 1957 (aged 18)
James Muir	4 January 1958 (aged 18)

=== Denmark ===
Six players represented Denmark in the 1976 Thomas Cup.

Name	DoB/Age
Svend Pri	18 March 1945 (aged 31)
Flemming Delfs	7 September 1951 (aged 24)
Elo Hansen	1945 (aged 30–31)
Steen Skovgaard	1950 (aged 25–26)
Poul Petersen	1950 (aged 25–26)
Per Walsøe	8 June 1943 (aged 32)

=== Indonesia ===
Nine players represented Indonesia in the 1976 Thomas Cup.

Name	DoB/Age
Rudy Hartono	18 August 1949 (aged 26)
Liem Swie King	28 February 1956 (aged 20)
Iie Sumirat	15 November 1950 (aged 25)
Tjun Tjun	4 October 1952 (aged 23)
Johan Wahjudi	10 February 1953 (aged 23)
Ade Chandra	4 February 1950 (aged 26)
Christian Hadinata	11 December 1949 (aged 26)
Amril Nurman	1948 (aged 27–28)
Dhany Sartika	1955 (aged 20–21)

=== Malaysia ===
Six players represented Malaysia in the 1976 Thomas Cup. Three players were selected as reserves.

Name	DoB/Age
Saw Swee Leong	16 July 1955 (aged 20)
Phua Ah Hua	1955 (aged 20–21)
Dominic Soong	1955 (aged 20–21)
Cheah Hong Chong	1953 (aged 22–23)
James Selvaraj	1 November 1950 (aged 25)
Moo Foot Lian	1955 (aged 20–21)
Reserve
Sufian Abu Bakar	1953 (aged 22–23)
Kwek Chiew Peng	1953 (aged 22–23)
Lim Cheng Hoe	1953 (aged 22–23)

=== New Zealand ===
Six players represented New Zealand in the 1976 Thomas Cup.

Name	DoB/Age
Richard Purser	28 February 1942 (aged 34)
Bryan Purser	18 October 1950 (aged 25)
Ross Livingston	8 March 1949 (aged 27)
Warren Johns	1949 (aged 26–27)
Chris Bullen	1953 (aged 22–23)
Steve Wilson	1953 (aged 22–23)

=== Thailand ===
Six players represented Thailand in the 1976 Thomas Cup.

Name	DoB/Age
Surapong Suharitdamrong	1951 (aged 24–25)
Bandid Jaiyen	5 March 1950 (aged 26)
Jiamsak Panitchaikul	7 July 1953 (aged 22)
Preecha Sopajaree	1951 (aged 24–25)
Pichai Kongsirithavorn	1953 (aged 22–23)
Komchan Promsarin	1960 (aged 15–16)
