= 1976 Thomas Cup knockout stage =

Badminton tournament

The knockout stage for the 1976 Thomas Cup began on 25 May 1976 with the first-round knockout and ended on 5 June with the final tie.

== Qualified teams ==
The teams that won their zonal tie qualified for the final knockout stage.

Group	Winners
H	Thailand
CH	Indonesia
AS	Malaysia
AM	Canada
AU	New Zealand
EU	Denmark

== Bracket ==
First round
Denmark
Bye
25 May 1976 – Bangkok
New Zealand	3
Malaysia	6
27 May 1976 – Bangkok
Thailand	9
Canada	0
Bye
Indonesia

Second round
29 May 1976 – Bangkok
Denmark	4
Malaysia	5
31 May 1976 – Bangkok
Thailand	1
Indonesia	8

Challenge round
4 June 1976 – Bangkok
Malaysia	0
Indonesia	9

== First round ==
The inter-zone ties (team matches) were held in Bangkok, Thailand in late May and early June. 1973 runner-up Denmark and defending champion Indonesia received byes and awaited the winners of Malaysia versus New Zealand and Canada versus Thailand respectively. New Zealand's fate was sealed when it could not break through against the Malaysian singles lineup of Phua Ah Hua, Saw Swee Leong, and James Selvaraj, despite some competitive matches. New Zealand doubles victories, two of them after the tie had been decided, made the final score 6–3. The Purser brothers, Bryan and older brother Richard both played well in defeat for the Kiwis.

The contest between Canada and host Thailand was quite lopsided. Though the Canadians had replaced several of its Pan American zone team members with younger players, it had retained the veteran ex-Thais Raphi Kanchanaraphi and Channarong Ratanaseangsuang, two heroes of Thailand's run to the Thomas Cup final a full fifteen years earlier. The old Thais could not match the young Thai doubles pairs, though, in extending one match to three games, they performed as well as anyone else on their team. Canada's singles number one Jamie McKee could average only six points a game against Thailand's Bandid Jaiyen and Surapong Suharitdamrong. Only one of the singles matches was moderately close in a 9–0 Thai victory

=== Malaysia vs New Zealand ===
Malaysia
6
Indoor Stadium Huamark
25–26 May 1976

New Zealand
3

			1	2	3
1	(Malaysia) (New Zealand)	Saw Swee Leong; Ross Livingston	15; 2	15; 7
2	(Malaysia) (New Zealand)	Phua Ah Hua; Bryan Purser	15; 6	15; 13
3	(Malaysia) (New Zealand)	James Selvaraj / Moo Foot Lian; Warren Johns / Ross Livingston	15; 9	13; 18	15; 7
4	(Malaysia) (New Zealand)	Cheah Hong Chong / Dominic Soong; Bryan Purser / Richard Purser	9; 15	15; 10	6; 15
5	(Malaysia) (New Zealand)	James Selvaraj; Richard Purser	12; 15	15; 11	15; 5
6	(Malaysia) (New Zealand)	Phua Ah Hua; Ross Livingston	15; 6	15; 10
7	(Malaysia) (New Zealand)	Saw Swee Leong; Bryan Purser	15; 5	4; 15	15; 9
8	(Malaysia) (New Zealand)	Cheah Hong Chong / Dominic Soong; Warren Johns / Ross Livingston	9; 15	9; 15
9	(Malaysia) (New Zealand)	James Selvaraj / Moo Foot Lian; Bryan Purser / Richard Purser	15; 7	4; 15	11; 15

=== Thailand vs Canada ===
Thailand
9
Indoor Stadium Huamark
27–28 May 1976

Canada
0

			1	2	3
1	(Thailand) (Canada)	Surapong Suharitdamrong; Jamie McKee	15; 6	15; 7
2	(Thailand) (Canada)	Bandid Jaiyen; John Czich	15; 8	15; 0
3	(Thailand) (Canada)	Pichai Kongsirithavorn / Preecha Soparajee; Lucio Fabris / James Muir	12; 15	15; 3	15; 7
4	(Thailand) (Canada)	Jiamsak Panitchaikul / Surapong Suharitdamrong; Raphi Kanchanaraphi / Channarong Ratanaseangsuang	15; 6	12; 15	15; 3
5	(Thailand) (Canada)	Pichai Kongsirithavorn; Lucio Fabris	15; 11	15; 8
6	(Thailand) (Canada)	Bandid Jaiyen; Jamie McKee	15; 9	15; 2
7	(Thailand) (Canada)	Surapong Suharitdamrong; John Czich	15; 2	15; 7
8	(Thailand) (Canada)	Pichai Kongsirithavorn / Preecha Soparajee; Raphi Kanchanaraphi / Channarong Ratanaseangsuang	15; 12	15; 6
9	(Thailand) (Canada)	Jiamsak Panitchaikul / Surapong Suharitdamrong; Lucio Fabris / James Muir	15; 2	15; 7

== Second round ==
The first inter-zone semifinal between Denmark and Malaysia was the shocker of the series. The Danes once again fielded a squad of "name" players (complete with three alternates), though a few were now on the downside of their careers. By contrast the Malaysian team consisted of relative unknowns, though three consecutive hard-fought ties had given them valuable experience. The redoubtable Svend Pri, now 31, led off for Denmark with a decisive straight games win over Phua Ah Hua. In the next match, however, Flemming Delfs, less than a year away from capturing the World Singles Championship in the familiar Scandinavian climate, faltered in the heat and humidity after winning the first game against Saw Swee Leong. Those results set the pattern for the tie; Denmark could win matches that counted only when Pri was on the court. At 4–3 in favor of Malaysia Pri was finally unable to carry partner Steen Skovgaard to victory against Dominic Soong and Cheah Hong Chong. The jubilant young Malaysians had reached the Thomas Cup final against form, losing an anticlimactic final match to make the score 5–4.

The outcome of the other semifinal was never really in doubt. Though host Thailand had received a bye into the inter-zone matches, it had also received "the short straw" by being placed in the Indonesian half of the draw. The performance of the diminutive but gifted Bandid Jaiyen, however, did offer some balm for Thailand's wounded pride. He had gained Thailand's only point against Indonesia in the previous Thomas Cup series, and did so again on the first night of play by fighting back from the brink of a straight games defeat to wear down powerhouse Iie Sumirat 15–5 in the third. Though Jaiyen played creditably on the second night against the iconic Rudy Hartono, he was beaten at 11 and 7. Surapong Suharitdamrong, the Thai number two, could collect only eleven points in four games against Hartono and Sumirat. The one close doubles match came after Indonesia had already clinched the tie to play in its seventh Thomas Cup final in seven attempts.

=== Denmark vs Malaysia ===
Denmark
4
Indoor Stadium Huamark
29–30 May 1976

Malaysia
5

			1	2	3
1	(Denmark) (Malaysia)	Flemming Delfs; Saw Swee Leong	17; 14	5; 15	6; 15
2	(Denmark) (Malaysia)	Svend Pri; Phua Ah Hua	15; 9	15; 4
3	(Denmark) (Malaysia)	Svend Pri / Steen Skovgaard; James Selvaraj / Moo Foot Lian	15; 9	18; 13
4	(Denmark) (Malaysia)	Poul Petersen / Per Walsøe; Cheah Hong Chong / Dominic Soong	6; 15	15; 10	7; 15
5	(Denmark) (Malaysia)	Elo Hansen; James Selvaraj	9; 15	9; 15
6	(Denmark) (Malaysia)	Svend Pri; Saw Swee Leong	15; 9	6; 15	15; 5
7	(Denmark) (Malaysia)	Flemming Delfs; Phua Ah Hua	12; 15	6; 15
8	(Denmark) (Malaysia)	Svend Pri / Steen Skovgaard; Cheah Hong Chong / Dominic Soong	16; 18	8; 15
9	(Denmark) (Malaysia)	Poul Petersen / Per Walsøe; James Selvaraj / Moo Foot Lian	15; 12	15; 2

=== Indonesia vs Thailand ===
Indonesia
8
Indoor Stadium Huamark
31 May – 1 June 1976

Thailand
1

			1	2	3
1	(Indonesia) (Thailand)	Rudy Hartono; Surapong Suharitdamrong	15; 1	15; 1
2	(Indonesia) (Thailand)	Iie Sumirat; Bandid Jaiyen	15; 9	13; 15	5; 15
3	(Indonesia) (Thailand)	Tjun Tjun / Johan Wahjudi; Jiamsak Panitchaikul / Surapong Suharitdamrong	15; 0	15; 6
4	(Indonesia) (Thailand)	Ade Chandra / Christian Hadinata; Pichai Kongsirithavorn / Preecha Soparajee	15; 8	15; 11
5	(Indonesia) (Thailand)	Tjun Tjun; Pichai Kongsirithavorn	15; 1	15; 12
6	(Indonesia) (Thailand)	Iie Sumirat; Surapong Suharitdamrong	12; 6	18; 3	13
7	(Indonesia) (Thailand)	Rudy Hartono; Bandid Jaiyen	15; 11	15; 7
8	(Indonesia) (Thailand)	Tjun Tjun / Johan Wahjudi; Jiamsak Panitchaikul / Surapong Suharitdamrong	15; 11	14; 17	15; 5
9	(Indonesia) (Thailand)	Ade Chandra / Christian Hadinata; Pichai Kongsirithavorn / Preecha Soparajee	15; 12	15; 7

== Challenge round ==
In reaching the 1976 Thomas Cup final a young Malaysian team had done what vastly more experienced and accomplished Malaysian team members had failed to do in 1973. Their fine run, however, came to an abrupt end against juggernaut Indonesia in perhaps the most one-sided championship tie in Thomas Cup history. Replacing Sumirat in one of the top singles positions for Indonesia, rising star Liem Swie King weathered close first games against both Phua Ah Hua and Saw Swee Leong before slamming the door against both in the second game. Hartono was never threatened. Malaysia's Dominic Soong and Cheah Hong Chong captured the first game against Tjun Tjun and Johan Wahjudi, but this was the extent of the Malaysian challenge. By a nine to zero final tally Indonesia retained the Thomas Cup. It was the first time that the championship round had ended in a shutout.

Indonesia
9
Indoor Stadium Huamark
4–5 June 1976

Malaysia
0

			1	2	3
1	(Indonesia) (Malaysia)	Liem Swie King; Phua Ah Hua	15; 12	15; 1
2	(Indonesia) (Malaysia)	Rudy Hartono; Saw Swee Leong	15; 7	15; 5
3	(Indonesia) (Malaysia)	Ade Chandra / Christian Hadinata; James Selvaraj / Moo Foot Lian	15; 4	15; 1
4	(Indonesia) (Malaysia)	Tjun Tjun / Johan Wahjudi; Cheah Hong Chong / Dominic Soong	13; 15	15; 6	15; 6
5	(Indonesia) (Malaysia)	Tjun Tjun; James Selvaraj	15; 1	15; 7
6	(Indonesia) (Malaysia)	Liem Swie King; Saw Swee Leong	18; 13	15; 3
7	(Indonesia) (Malaysia)	Rudy Hartono; Phua Ah Hua	15; 5	15; 1
8	(Indonesia) (Malaysia)	Ade Chandra / Christian Hadinata; Cheah Hong Chong / Phua Ah Hua	15; 6	15; 11
9	(Indonesia) (Malaysia)	Tjun Tjun / Johan Wahjudi; James Selvaraj / Moo Foot Lian	15; 6	15; 2
