= Badminton at the 1979 SEA Games – Men's team =

Badminton – Men's team at the 1979 SEA Games
- Venue: Gema Sumantri Hall, Jakarta, Indonesia
- Dates: 22–24 September 1979
- Nations: 3

Medalists
gold medal	Indonesia (INA)
silver medal	Malaysia (MAL)
bronze medal	Thailand (THA)

The men's team badminton tournament at the 1979 SEA Games was held from 22 to 24 September 1979 at Gema Sumantri Hall in Jakarta, Indonesia. The defending champions were Indonesia who beat Thailand 3–1 in the last edition of the Games.

Only three countries competed in this event, the three being Indonesia, Malaysia and Thailand. The event was played in a round-robin format.

== Schedule ==
All times are Western Indonesia Time (UTC+07:00)

Date	Time	Event
Sunday, 23 September	19:30	Malaysia vs Thailand
Monday, 24 September	19:30	Indonesia vs Malaysia

== Bracket ==
Semi-finals		Gold medal match
		Indonesia (INA)	4
		Malaysia (MAL)	1
Malaysia (MAL)	4	Malaysia (MAL)	1
Thailand (THA)	1

== Semi-finals ==
=== Malaysia vs Thailand ===
Malaysia
4
Gema Sumantri Hall
23 September 1979, 19:30

Thailand
1

			1	2	3
1	(Malaysia) (Thailand)	Saw Swee Leong; Bandid Jaiyen	12; 15	15; 10	15; 1
2	(Malaysia) (Thailand)	James Selvaraj; Udom Luangpetcharaporn	15; 8	15; 3
3	(Malaysia) (Thailand)	Ho Khim Soon / Kwek Chiew Peng; Bandid Jaiyen / Preecha Sopajaree	9; 15	15; 6	15; 10
4	(Malaysia) (Thailand)	Misbun Sidek / Ong Teong Boon; Sawei Chanseorasmee / Sarit Pisudchaikul	15; 9	18; 16
5	(Malaysia) (Thailand)	Misbun Sidek; Surapong Suharitdamrong	11; 15	15; 12	8; 15

== Gold medal match ==
=== Indonesia vs Malaysia ===
Indonesia
4
Gema Sumantri Hall
24 September 1979, 19:30

Malaysia
1

			1	2	3
1	(Indonesia) (Malaysia)	Liem Swie King; Saw Swee Leong	15; 1	15; 7
2	(Indonesia) (Malaysia)	Hastomo Arbi; James Selvaraj	15; 2	15; 3
3	(Indonesia) (Malaysia)	Ade Chandra / Christian Hadinata; Misbun Sidek / Ong Teong Boon	15; 12	15; 9
4	(Indonesia) (Malaysia)	Rudy Heryanto / Kartono; Ho Khim Soon / Kwek Chiew Peng	15; 4	15; 7
5	(Indonesia) (Malaysia)	Christian Hadinata; Misbun Sidek				w/o

== See also ==
- Individual event tournament
- Women's team tournament
