= Malaysia at the 1973 SEAP Games =

Malaysia at the 1973 Southeast Asian Peninsular Games
- IOC code: MAS
- NOC: Olympic Council of Malaysia
- Website: www.olympic.org.my (in English)

in Singapore
- Competitors: 299 in 16 sports
- Medals Ranked 3rd: Gold 30 Silver 35 Bronze 50 Total 115

Southeast Asian Peninsular Games appearances
- 1959; 1961; 1965; 1967; 1969; 1971; 1973; 1975; 1977; 1979; 1981; 1983; 1985; 1987; 1989; 1991; 1993; 1995; 1997; 1999; 2001; 2003; 2005; 2007; 2009; 2011; 2013; 2015; 2017; 2019; 2021; 2023; 2025; 2027; 2029

Malaysia competed in the 1973 Southeast Asian Peninsular Games held in Bangkok, Thailand from 1 to 8 September 1973. It won 30 gold, 35 silver and 50 bronze medals.

== Medal summary ==
=== Medals by sport ===
Sport	Gold	Silver	Bronze	Total	Rank
Athletics	10	0	0	10	
Badminton	4	4	1	9	1
Football	0	0	1	1	3
Table tennis	2	0	2	4	1
Total	30	35	50	115	3

=== Medallists ===
Medal	Name	Sport	Event
Gold	Baba Singhe Payadesa	Athletics	Men's 400 metres
Gold	Ishtiaq Mubarak	Athletics	Men's 110 metres hurdles
Gold	Shahlan Tahir	Athletics	Men's triple jump
Gold	Muthiah Dattaya	Athletics	Men's hammer throw
Gold	Nashatar Singh Sidhu	Athletics	Men's javelin throw
Gold	Janardhanan Vijayan	Athletics	Men's decathlon
Gold	Khoo Chong Beng	Athletics	Men's 20 kilometres road walk
Gold		Athletics	Men's 4 × 400 metres relay
Gold	Gladys Chai Ng Mei	Athletics	Women's high jump
Gold	Gladys Chai Ng Mei	Athletics	Women's heptathlon
Gold	Punch Gunalan	Badminton	Men's singles
Gold	Sylvia Ng Meow Eng	Badminton	Women's singles
Gold	Rosalind Singha Ang; Sylvia Ng Meow Eng	Badminton	Women's doubles
Gold	Malaysia national badminton team: Sylvia Ng Meow Eng; Rosalind Singha Ang; Sylvia Tan; Teh Swee Pek	Badminton	Women's team
Gold	Peong Tah Seng	Table tennis	Men's singles
Gold	Tan Sok Hong	Table tennis	Women's singles
Silver	Tan Aik Mong	Badminton	Men's singles
Silver	Rosalind Singha Ang	Badminton	Women's singles
Silver	Dominic Soong; Punch Gunalan	Badminton	Men's doubles
Silver	Malaysia national badminton team: Moo Foot Lian; Tan Aik Mong; Punch Gunalan; Dominic Soong; James Selvaraj; Phua Ah Hua	Badminton	Men's team
Bronze	Punch Gunalan; Sylvia Ng Meow Eng	Badminton	Mixed doubles
Bronze	Malaysia national football team	Football	Men's tournament
Bronze	Soong Poh Wah	Table tennis	Men's singles
Bronze	Lim Hee Peng; Peong Tah Seng	Table tennis	Men's doubles
