= Sayan Paratanavong =

Thai sprinter (born 1951)

Personal information
- Nationality: Thai
- Born: 19 December 1951 (age 74)

Sport
- Sport: Sprinting
- Event: 4 × 100 metres relay
Medal record
Men's athletics
Representing Thailand
SEA Games
Bronze medal – third place	1973 Singapore	400 m
Bronze medal – third place	1973 Singapore	4 × 400 m
Gold medal – first place	1975 Bangkok	400 m
Gold medal – first place	1975 Bangkok	4 × 200 m

Sayan Paratanavong (born 19 December 1951) is a Thai sprinter. He was a two-time gold medalist at the SEAP Games and competed in the men's 4 × 100 metres relay at the 1976 Summer Olympics.

== Career ==
At the 1973 SEAP Games in September, Paratanavong won two bronze medals. In the 400 m, he ran a time of 48.9 seconds behind Baba Singhe Peyadesa and Savin Chem. Running second leg, Paratanavong also won a bronze medal in the 4 × 400 m relay.

Later that year at the 1973 Asian Athletics Championships, Paratanavong entered in the 200 m, 400 m, and 4 × 400 m but did not win any medals.

Paratanavong won his first SEAP Games gold medals at the 1975 SEAP Games in Bangkok. In the 400 m, he won in a personal best time of 48.09 seconds. He also anchored the Thai team's 4 × 200 metres relay to the gold medal in a 1:25.0 time.

Paratanavong was selected to represent Thailand at the 1976 Summer Olympics in the 4 × 100 m relay. He anchored the Thai team in the 5th heat, finishing 5th in 40.53 seconds.

His team advanced to the semi-finals later that day. With Paratanavong again on anchor, the team ran 40.68 seconds to finish 8th, failing to advance to the finals.
