= 1979 All England Open Badminton Championships =

1979 All England Championships
Tournament details
- Dates: March 21– March 25
- Edition: 69th
- Venue: Wembley Arena
- Location: London

The 1979 All England Championships was a badminton tournament held at Wembley Arena, London, England in March 1979.

== Final results ==
Category	Winners	Runners-up	Score
Men's singles	(Indonesia) Liem Swie King	(Denmark) Flemming Delfs	15–7, 15–8
Women's singles	(Denmark) Lene Køppen	(Japan) Saori Kondo	13–9, 1–11, 11–8
Men's doubles	(Indonesia) Tjun Tjun & Johan Wahjudi	(Sweden) Stefan Karlsson & Claes Nordin	17–16, 15–3
Women's doubles	(Indonesia) Verawaty Wiharjo & Imelda Wiguna	(Japan) Atsuko Tokuda & Mikiko Takada	15–3, 10–15, 15–5
Mixed doubles	(Indonesia) Christian Hadinata & Imelda Wiguna	(England) Mike Tredgett & Nora Perry	15–1, 18–17

== Men's singles ==
=== Seeds ===
1. (Indonesia) Liem Swie King
2. (India) Prakash Padukone - withdrew injured
3. (Denmark) Flemming Delfs
4. (Denmark) Morten Frost
5. (Japan) Kinji Zeniya
6. (Denmark) Svend Pri
7. (Sweden) Thomas Kihlström

=== Section 1 ===
Round of 32
(Indonesia) Liem Swie King
(Denmark) Mogens Neergaard
(Denmark) Steen Fladberg
(Sweden) Thomas Kihlström
(Denmark) Morten Frost Hansen
(England) Brian Wallwork
(Indonesia) Dhany Sartika
(Japan) Kinji Zeniya

Round of 16
(Indonesia) Swie King	15	15
(Denmark) Neergaard	1	5
(Denmark) Fladberg	15	2	17
(Sweden) Kihlström	12	15	15
(Denmark) Frost	15	15
(England) Wallwork	2	1
(Indonesia) Sartika	15	18
(Japan) Zeniya	11	16

Quarter-finals
(Indonesia) Swie King	15	15
(Denmark) Fladberg	8	5
(Denmark) Frost	14	15	15
(Indonesia) Sartika	17	13	12

Semi-finals
(Indonesia) Swie King	15	18
(Denmark) Frost	4	15

=== Section 2 ===
Round of 32
(Denmark) Flemming Delfs
(Wales) Philip Sutton
(Sweden) Sture Johnsson
(Japan) Masao Tsuchida
(Denmark) Svend Pri
(England) Kevin Jolly
(Indonesia) Lius Pongoh
(Japan) Yoshitaka Iino

Round of 16
(Denmark) Delfs	15	15
(Wales) Sutton	5	0
(Sweden) Johnsson	15	15
(Japan) Tsuchida	7	7
(Denmark) Pri	12	15	15
(England) Jolly	15	0	9
(Indonesia) Pongoh	15	15
(Japan) Iino	10	11

Quarter-finals
(Denmark) Delfs	15	12	15
(Sweden) Johnsson	8	15	5
(Denmark) Pri	15	15
(Indonesia) Pongoh	4	6

Semi-finals
(Denmark) Delfs	17	17
(Denmark) Pri	14	16

== Women's singles ==
=== Seeds ===
1. (Denmark) Lene Køppen
2. (Japan) Hiroe Yuki
3. (Indonesia) Verawaty Wiharjo
4. (England) Gillian Gilks
5. (Canada) Wendy Carter
6. (England) Nora Perry
7. (England) Jane Webster
8. (Japan) Atsuko Tokuda

=== Section 1 ===
Round of 32
(Denmark) Lene Køppen
(Japan) Atsuko Tokuda
(England) Gillian Gilks
(Japan) Yoshiko Yonekura
(Canada) Wendy Carter
(Japan) Hitomi Isheda

Round of 16
(Denmark) Køppen
(Japan) Tokuda
(England) Gilks	11	11
(Japan) Yonekura	0	1
(Canada) Carter	12	11
(Japan) Isheda	10	6

Quarter-finals
(Denmark) Køppen	11	11
(Japan) Tokuda	2	4
(England) Gilks	12	11
(Canada) Carter	11	8

Semi-finals
(Denmark) Køppen
(England) Gilks

=== Section 2 ===
Round of 32
(Japan) Saori Kondo
(Indonesia) Verawaty Wiharjo
(Japan) Mikiko Takada
(Denmark) Pia Nielsen
(England) Jane Webster
(Japan) Hiroe Yuki

Round of 16
(Japan) Kondo	11	11
(Indonesia) Verawaty	6	3
(Japan) Takada	w/o
(Denmark) Nielsen	scr
(England) Webster
(Japan) Yuki

Quarter-finals
(Japan) Kondo	11	11
(Japan) Takada	3	4
(England) Webster	8	12	11
(Japan) Yuki	11	9	2

Semi-finals
(Japan) Kondo
(England) Webster
