= Athletics at the 1977 SEA Games =

Medal results of sporting event

The athletics at the 1977 SEA Games was held at the Merdeka Stadium, Kuala Lumpur, Malaysia.

== Medal summary ==
=== Men ===
Event	Gold		Silver		Bronze	
100 m	(Thailand) Suchart Jairsuraparp	10.58	(Thailand) Anat Ratanapol	10.75	(Singapore) Canagasabai Kunalan	10.81
200 m	(Thailand) Anat Ratanapol	21.42	(Indonesia) Jeffrey Matahelemual	21.90	(Malaysia) Ramli Ahmad	21.95
400 m	(Malaysia) Sukinder Singh Sangedha	48.22	(Indonesia) Mudjiono	48.67	(Malaysia) Mariah Naidu	49.00
800 m	(Myanmar) Jimmy Crampton	1:52.67	(Malaysia) Kanagarajah Yogeswaran	1:53.24	(Philippines) Tito Tulanan	1:54.47
1500 m	(Myanmar) Jimmy Crampton	3:52.90	(Malaysia) Kanagarajah Yogeswaran	3:58.43	(Malaysia) Ramasamy Appavoo Kandiah	4:00.17
5000 m	(Myanmar) Ko Ko	14:47.0	(Myanmar) Maung Hla	15:08.2	(Malaysia) Ramasamy Appavoo Kandiah	15:16.2
10,000 m	(Myanmar) Ko Ko	32:16.8	(Myanmar) Aung Than	32:55.9	(Malaysia) Ramasamy Appavoo Kandiah	35:02.0
Marathon	(Myanmar) Khin Soe	2"26:18.1	(Myanmar) Aung Than	2"28:18.6	(Singapore) Shiva Kumaravelu	2"40:32.2
110 m hurdles	(Malaysia) Ishtiaq Mubarak	14.46	(Myanmar) Hpone Myint	14.49	(Malaysia) Shahidan Bahorom	14.99
400 m hurdles	(Malaysia) Simit Bolkiah	53.45	(Myanmar) Hpone Myint	53.74	(Indonesia) Melly Mofu	53.75
3000 m steeplechase	(Myanmar) Maung Hla	9:12.3	(Malaysia) Paul Thambidorai	9:26.8	(Myanmar) Michael	9:31.3
4 × 100 m relay	Thailand; Somsakdi Boontud; Suchart Jairsuraparp; Kanoksakdi Chatasanond; Anat Ratanapol	40.40 (GR)	Singapore; Canagasabai Kunalan; Tang Ngai Kin; Ong Yoke Phee; Leslie Shepherdson	41.42	Indonesia; Yacob Mursidi Waas; Ready Suyono Basuki; Mohammed Hariyanto; Jeffrey Mathelemuel	41.47
4 × 400 m relay	Malaysia; Baba Singhe Peyadesa; Mariah Naidu; Harun Rasheed; Sukninder Singh Sangedha	3:14.36	Thailand; Anat Ratanapol; Somsakdi Boontud; Supanit Wongsalangkarn; Suvan Prasanchart	3:16.27	Indonesia; Mohammed Hariyanto; Mohammed Hatta Maraxa; Melly Mofu; Mudjiono	3:16.89
10 km walk	(Malaysia) Vellasamy Subramaniam	45:48.1	(Malaysia) Khoo Chong Beng	46:28.9	(Singapore) Rengasamy Nadarajan	51:41.0
20 km walk	(Malaysia) Khoo Chong Beng	1"33:35.1 (GR)	(Malaysia) Vellasamy Subramaniam	1"40:18.9	(Singapore) Raja Maniam	1"47:13.0
High jump	(Malaysia) Baljit Singh Sidhu	2.04 m	(Philippines) Elmer Reyes	1.97 m	(Malaysia) Sasi Kumar	1.95 m
Pole vault	(Thailand) Kanop Ratanachamnong	4.30 m	(Myanmar) Tet Thun Kyaw	4.10 m	(Thailand) Prayul Nimasakorn	4.00 m
Long jump	(Myanmar) Thant Zin	7.56 m	(Thailand) Prapant Srisathorn	7.47 m	(Thailand) Chaiyan Goomolingdon	7.03 m
Triple jump	(Thailand) Chaiyasit Suriyachan	14.96 m	(Malaysia) Marzuki Abdul Aziz	14.84 m	(Brunei) Yaacub Muhammed	14.38 m
Shot put	(Indonesia) Usman Effendi	14.49 m	(Philippines) Susano Erang	14.24 m	(Thailand) Samai Chartmontri	13.53 m
Discus throw	(Thailand) Samai Chartmontri	45.06 m	(Malaysia) Dhanapal Naidu	43.76 m	(Indonesia) Usman Effendi	41.20 m
Hammer throw	(Singapore) Sankaran Gawade	42.46 m	(Indonesia) Ir. Komot Heruwanto	42.16 m	(Malaysia) Ghenda Singh	41.60 m
Javelin throw	(Malaysia) Ballang Lasung	70.28 m	(Malaysia) Nashatar Singh Sidhu	66.10 m	(Indonesia) Yoyo Bahagia	64.18 m
Decathlon	(Thailand) Prapant Srisathorn	6809 pts	(Singapore) Tang Ngai Kin	6435 pts	(Indonesia) Jusuf Ibrahim	5806 pts

=== Women ===
Event	Gold		Silver		Bronze	
100 m	(Indonesia) Carolina Rieuwpassa	12.22	(Thailand) Usanee Laopinkarn	12.22	(Philippines) Gloria Acedo	12.58
200 m	(Myanmar) Than Than	24.90	(Indonesia) Carolina Rieuwpassa	25.41	(Thailand) Usanee Laopinkarn	25.60
400 m	(Myanmar) Than Than	56.29	(Malaysia) Vengadasalam Angamah	56.89	(Malaysia) Saik Oik Cum	57.72
800 m	(Myanmar) Than Than	2:11.07	(Myanmar) Myint Myint Than	2:11.88	(Singapore) Kandasamy Jayamani	2:14.87
1500 m	(Singapore) Kandasamy Jayamani	4:50.74	(Myanmar) Mar Mar Min	4:52.55	(Indonesia) Lelyana Tjandra Wijaya	4:53.17
3000 m	(Singapore) Kandasamy Jayamani	10:18.7	(Indonesia) Lelyana Tjandra Wijaya	10:37.6	(Philippines) Arsenia Sagaray	10:38.2
Marathon	(Myanmar) Weik Pan	2:57.32	(Indonesia) Tan Siu Chen	3:01.51	(Indonesia) Maria Lawalata	3:11.15
100 m hurdles	(Malaysia) Marina Chin Leng Sim	14.40	(Thailand) Chintana Kiewlongga	15.05	(Myanmar) Nwe New Yee	15.14
200 m hurdles	(Malaysia) Marina Chin Leng Sim	28.13 (GR)	(Singapore) Heather Siddons Merican	29.41	(Philippines) Lucia Tolentino	29.69
400 m hurdles	(Malaysia) Jessica Lau Kiew Ee	1:04.16	(Malaysia) Marina Chin Leng Sim	1:04.37	(Myanmar) Nwe New Yee	1:04.71
4 × 100 m relay	Thailand; Usanee Laopinkarn; Walapa Tangjitnusorn; Pusadee Sangvijit; Buspranee Ratanapol	47.40	Malaysia; Noreen Pereira; Marina Chin; Vengadasalam Angamah; Irene Wan	47.71	Indonesia; Merry Rikumahu; Carolina Rieuwpassa; Satiani; Audrey Syarahamaua	48.44
4 × 400 m relay	Myanmar; Aye Shwe; Myint Myint Than; Mar Mar Min; Than Than	3:49.37	Malaysia; Vengadasalam Angamah; Lau Kiew Ee; Saik Oik Chum; Fatimah Abu Saman	3:53.18	Thailand; Usanee Laopinkarn; Walapa Tangjitnusorn; Pusadee Sangvijit; Inouy Thavatchote	3:54.27
Pentathlon	(Thailand) Vannipa Sangsavong	3284	(Myanmar) Eileen Chit	3246	(Philippines) Nanette Lusterio	3109
5 km walk	(Myanmar) Su Su	27:14.14	(Malaysia) Kalaimaney Sengany	27:19.08	(Myanmar) Nwe Nwe Aye	28:10.06
10 km walk	(Malaysia) Kalaimaney Sengany	57:26.09	(Myanmar) Su Su	59:30.09	(Myanmar) Nwe Nwe Aye	59:37.00
Long jump	(Myanmar) Aye Shwe	5.57 m	(Philippines) Lydia Silva-Netto	5.56 m	(Myanmar) Eileen Chit	5.43 m
High jump	(Myanmar) Eileen Chit	1.62 m	(Philippines) Delia Orquillas	1.56 m	(Malaysia) Jamaliah Jais	1.53 m
Shot put	(Myanmar) Jennifer Tinlay	13.45 m	(Philippines) Consuelo Lacusong	12.15 m	(Myanmar) Khin Nyo	11.97 m
Discus throw	(Myanmar) Jennifer Tinlay	44.84 m (GR)	(Philippines) Consuelo Lacusong	39.76 m	(Myanmar) Khin Nyo	37.30 m
Javelin throw	(Philippines) Erlinda Lavandia	45.22 m (GR)	(Singapore) Chua Kim Tee	41.98 m	(Indonesia) Sutjiati	41.22 m

== Medal table ==
Rank	Nation	Gold	Silver	Bronze	Total
1	Burma	17	10	8	35
2	Malaysia	12	13	10	35
3	Thailand	9	5	5	19
4	Singapore	3	4	5	12
5	Indonesia	2	6	10	18
6	Philippines	1	6	5	12
7	Brunei	0	0	1	1
Totals (7 entries)		44	44	44	132
