= Sepak takraw at the 1977 SEA Games =

Sepak Takraw for the 1977 Southeast Asian Games was held at Stadium Negara and Chin Woo Stadium in Kuala Lumpur on 25 November 1977.

== Results ==
Place	Country
1	Malaysia (MAS)
2	Thailand (THA)
3	Singapore (SIN)
4	Burma (BIR)
