= Badminton at the 1977 SEA Games – Women's team =

Badminton – Women's team at the 1977 SEA Games
- Venue: Stadium Negara
- Dates: 19–20 November 1977
- Nations: 5

Medalists
gold medal	Indonesia (INA)
silver medal	Malaysia (MAL)
bronze medal	Thailand (THA)

The women's team badminton tournament at the 1977 SEA Games was held from 19 to 20 November 1977 at Stadium Negara in Kuala Lumpur, Malaysia. The defending champions were Malaysia who beat Thailand 3–0 in the last edition of the Games.

== Schedule ==
All times are Malaysia Standard Time (UTC+07:30)

Date	Time	Event
Saturday, 19 November	19:30	First round
Sunday, 20 November	09:00	Semi-final
Sunday, 20 November	14:00	Bronze medal match
Sunday, 20 November	19:00	Gold medal match

== Bracket ==
First round
Thailand (THA)	3
Singapore (SIN)	0

Semi-finals
Malaysia (MAL)	3
Thailand (THA)	2
Burma (BIR)	0
Indonesia (INA)	5

Gold medal match
Malaysia (MAL)	1
Indonesia (INA)	3
Bronze medal match
Thailand (THA)	3
Burma (BIR)	1

== First round ==
=== Thailand vs Singapore ===
Thailand
3
Stadium Negara
19 November 1977, 19:30

Singapore
0

			1	2	3
1	(Thailand) (Singapore)	Sirisriro Patama; Cindy Cheong	11; 6	11; 9
2	(Thailand) (Singapore)	Thongkam Kingmanee; Juliana Lee	11; 4	11; 2
3	(Thailand) (Singapore)	Suleeporn Jittariyakul / Sirisriro Patama; Leong Kay Sine / Peh Ah Bee	15; 1	15; 1
4	(Thailand) (Singapore)	Thongkam Kingmanee / Porntip Buntanon; Cindy Cheong / Faridah Noh				not played
5	(Thailand) (Singapore)	Petchroong Liengtrakulngam; Leong Kay Sine				not played

== Semi-finals ==
=== Malaysia vs Thailand ===
Malaysia
3
Stadium Negara
20 November 1977, 09:00

Thailand
2

			1	2	3
1	(Malaysia) (Thailand)	Sylvia Ng; Sirisriro Patama	12; 10	11; 8
2	(Malaysia) (Thailand)	Katherine Teh; Thongkam Kingmanee	2; 11	10; 12
3	(Malaysia) (Thailand)	Rosalind Singha Ang / Sylvia Ng; Suleeporn Jittariyakul / Sirisriro Patama	15; 11	15; 11
4	(Malaysia) (Thailand)	Katherine Teh / Yap Hei Lin; Thongkam Kingmanee / Porntip Buntanon	10; 15	14; 17
5	(Malaysia) (Thailand)	Ong Ah Hong; Petchroong Liengtrakulngam	11; 7	7; 11	11; 5

=== Indonesia vs Burma ===
Indonesia
5
Stadium Negara
20 November 1977, 09:00

Burma
0

			1	2	3
1	(Indonesia) (Myanmar)	Verawaty Wiharjo; Thida Aye Nyo	11; 1	11; 3
2	(Indonesia) (Myanmar)	Taty Sumirah; Khin Khin Aye	11; 1	11; 4
3	(Indonesia) (Myanmar)	Regina Masli / Theresia Widiastuti; Thida Aye Nyo / Mya Lay Sein	15; 10	15; 6
4	(Indonesia) (Myanmar)	Imelda Wiguna / Verawaty Wiharjo; Khin Khin Aye / Nan Htwe Khan	15; 3	15; 8
5	(Indonesia) (Myanmar)	Ivana Lie; Mya Lay Sein	11; 6	11; 6

== Bronze medal match ==
=== Thailand vs Burma ===
Thailand
3
Stadium Negara
20 November 1977, 14:00

Burma
1

			1	2	3
1	(Thailand) (Myanmar)	Sirisriro Patama; Thida Aye Nyo	11; 1	11; 3
2	(Thailand) (Myanmar)	Thongkam Kingmanee; Khin Khin Aye	11; 1	11; 4
3	(Thailand) (Myanmar)	Suleeporn Jittariyakul / Sirisriro Patama; Thida Aye Nyo / Mya Lay Sein	8; 15	15; 6	11; 15
4	(Thailand) (Myanmar)	Thongkam Kingmanee / Porntip Buntanon; Khin Khin Aye / Nan Htwe Khan	15; 3	15; 5
5	(Thailand) (Myanmar)	Petchroong Liengtrakulngam; Mya Lay Sein				not played

== Gold medal match ==
=== Malaysia vs Indonesia ===
Malaysia
1
Stadium Negara
20 November 1977, 19:00

Indonesia
3

			1	2	3
1	(Malaysia) (Indonesia)	Sylvia Ng; Verawaty Wiharjo	11; 5	2; 11	0; 11
2	(Malaysia) (Indonesia)	Ong Ah Hong; Ivana Lie	12; 10	11; 5
3	(Malaysia) (Indonesia)	Rosalind Singha Ang / Sylvia Ng; Regina Masli / Theresia Widiastuti	3; 15	2; 15
4	(Malaysia) (Indonesia)	Katherine Teh / Ong Ah Hong; Imelda Wiguna / Verawaty Wiharjo	3; 15	4; 15
5	(Malaysia) (Indonesia)	Yap Hei Lin; Taty Sumirah				not played

== See also ==
- Individual event tournament
- Men's team tournament
