= Badminton at the 1977 SEA Games =

Badminton tournament

- Venue: Selangor Badminton Association Hall & Stadium Negara
- Location: Kuala Lumpur
- Dates: 19–26 November 1977

The badminton competition at the 1977 SEA Games took place at Selangor Badminton Association Hall and Stadium Negara in Kuala Lumpur, Malaysia from 19 to 26 November 1977. 7 events were featured similarly to the past edition.

== Medal table ==
* Host nation (Malaysia)

Rank	Nation	Gold	Silver	Bronze	Total
1	Indonesia	6	2	1	9
2	Malaysia*	1	3	2	6
3	Thailand	0	2	4	6
Totals (3 entries)		7	7	7	21

== Medalists ==
Event	Gold	Silver	Bronze
Men's singles	Liem Swie King; Indonesia	Dhany Sartika; Indonesia	James Selvaraj; Malaysia
Women's singles	Sylvia Ng; Malaysia	Verawaty Wiharjo; Indonesia	Sirisriro Patama; Thailand
Men's doubles	Indonesia; Tjun Tjun; Johan Wahjudi	Thailand; Pichai Kongsirithavorn; Preecha Sopajaree	Thailand; Bandid Jaiyen; Surapong Suharitdamrong
Women's doubles	Indonesia; Theresia Widiastuti; Regina Masli	Malaysia; Rosalind Singha Ang; Sylvia Ng	Indonesia; Verawaty Wiharjo; Imelda Wiguna
Mixed doubles	Indonesia; Christian Hadinata; Regina Masli	Malaysia; Dominic Soong; Yap Hei Lin	Thailand; Preecha Sopajaree; Porntip Buntanon
Men's team	Indonesia; Ade Chandra; Christian Hadinata; Liem Swie King; Dhany Sartika; Tjun Tjun; Johan Wahjudi	Thailand; Bandid Jaiyen; Pichai Kongsirithavorn; Preecha Sopajaree; Surapong Suharitdamrong; Udom Luengpetcharaporn	Malaysia; Koay Kar Lin; Saw Swee Leong; James Selvaraj; Dominic Soong; Moo Foot Lian; Lim Cheng Hoe
Women's team	Indonesia; Ivanna Lie; Regina Masli; Tati Sumirah; Theresia Widiastuti; Imelda Wiguna; Verawaty Wiharjo	Malaysia; Rosalind Singha Ang; Sylvia Ng; Ong Ah Hong; Yap Hei Lin; Katherine Teh	Thailand; Suleeporn Jittariyakul; Thongkam Kingmanee; Petchroong Liengtrakulngam; Sirisriro Patama; Porntip Buntanon

== Final results ==
Discipline	Winner	Finalist	Score
Men's singles	(Indonesia) Liem Swie King	(Indonesia) Dhany Sartika	15–9, 15–5
Women's singles	(Malaysia) Sylvia Ng	(Indonesia) Verawaty Wiharjo	4–11, 11–4, 11–5
Men's doubles	(Indonesia) Tjun Tjun & Johan Wahjudi	(Thailand) Pichai Kongsirithavorn & Preecha Sopajaree	15–10, 15–3
Women's doubles	(Indonesia) Regina Masli & Theresia Widiastuti	(Malaysia) Rosalind Singha Ang & Sylvia Ng	15–2, 15–4
Mixed doubles	(Indonesia) Christian Hadinata & Regina Masli	(Malaysia) Dominic Soong & Yap Hei Lin	15–10, 15–6
