= Cycling at the 1977 SEA Games =

The Cycling at the 1977 SEA Games were held at Kuching Street, Kuala Lumpur, Malaysia. Cycling events were held between 20 November to 23 November.

== Medal summary ==
=== Men ===
| Event | Gold | Silver | Bronze |
|---|---|---|---|
| 1600 m massed start | (Singapore) Jamil Mohammed | (Malaysia) Jamaluddin Omar | (Myanmar) Thien Zaw |
| 4000 m individual pursuit | (Indonesia) Sutiyono | (Thailand) Choosak Seepol | (Singapore) Abbas Mutalib |
| 100 km Team trial | Indonesia Das Rizal; Munawar Saleh; Suharto; Sutiyono | Thailand Chartchai Jantart; Choosak Seepol; Prajin Roongje; Pongpan Chuaynookul | Malaysia Ali Hasan; Abu Bakar Mat; Razak Khamis; Ismail Ghani |
