= Table tennis at the 1973 SEAP Games =

The Table Tennis at the 1973 SEAP Games was held between 2 and 6 September at National Junior College, Singapore.

== Medal summary ==
Event	Gold	Silver	Bronze
Men Singles	(Malaysia) Peong Tah Seng	(South Vietnam) Vuong Chinh Hoc	(Malaysia) Soong Poh Wah (Thailand) Chuchai S.
Men's Doubles	Singapore (SIN); Tan Yong Hong; Chia Choong Boon	Vietnam (VIE); Le Van Inh; Tran Thanh Duong	Vietnam (VIE); Tran Cong Minh; Vuong Chinh Hoc Malaysia (MAS); Peong Tah Seng; Lim Hee Peng
Women Singles	(Malaysia) Tan Sok Hong	(Khmer Republic) Tan Sock Cheng	(Khmer Republic) Boppha Rattanak (Singapore) Peak Noi Hooy
Women's Doubles	Singapore (SIN); Peck Noi Hwoy; Tan Kek Hiang	Thailand (THA); Sumalee Jusatayanond; Malika B.	Thailand (THA); Lavad Wongpansawad; Pakhatip L. Malaysia (MAS); Ong Yong Luan; Yap Ai Suan
Mix Doubles	Thailand (THA); Preechan S. Sumalee Jusatayanond	Khmer Republic (KHM); Tek Hanh Thi; Tan Sock Cheng	Singapore (SIN); Chia Choong Boon; Tan Kek Hiang Malaysia (MAS); Peong Tah Seng; Tan Sok Hong
Men's team	Singapore (SIN); Tan Khoon Hong; Tan Kai Kok; Chia Chong Boon	Malaysia (MAS); Soong Poh Wah; Long Ping Sum; Peong Tah Seng	Vietnam (VIE); Vuong Chinh Hoc; Le Van Inh; Tran Tanh Duong
Women's team	Khmer Republic (KHM); Boppha Rattanak; Tan Soe; Tong Sauv Luyen	Thailand (THA); Sumalee Jusatayanond; Lavad Wongpansawad; Pakhatip L.	Singapore (SIN); Peck Noi Hwoy; Tan Kek Hiang; Yap Ai Suan

== Medal table ==
Rank	Nation	Gold	Silver	Bronze	Total
1	Singapore (SIN)	3	0	2	5
2	Malaysia (MAS)	2	1	4	7
3	Thailand (THA)	1	2	3	6
4	Cambodia (KHM)	1	2	1	4
5	South Vietnam (VNM)	0	2	2	4
Totals (5 entries)		7	7	12	26
