= Ramli Ahmad =

Malaysian sprinter

Personal information
- Nationality: Malaysian
- Born: 12 October 1956
- Died: 16 November 2002 (aged 46)
- Height: 175 cm (5 ft 9 in)
- Weight: 67 kg (148 lb)

Sport
- Sport: Sprinting
- Event: 100 metres

Ramli Ahmad (12 October 1956 – 16 November 2002) was a Malaysian sprinter. He competed in the men's 100 metres at the 1976 Summer Olympics.

At athletics at the 1977 SEA Games, Ahmad won a bronze medal, and in 1975 he won a silver medal.

He was considered Malaysia's top sprinter in the 1970s, and he set a Malaysian national record in the 200 metres with a time of 20.7 from 1976. His record stood until his death by stroke in 2002.
