= Badminton at the 1979 SEA Games – Women's team =

Badminton – Women's team at the 1979 SEA Games
- Venue: Gema Sumantri Hall, Jakarta, Indonesia
- Dates: 22–24 September 1979
- Nations: 4

Medalists
gold medal	Indonesia (INA)
silver medal	Thailand (THA)
bronze medal	Malaysia (MAL)
bronze medal	Burma (BIR)

The women's team badminton tournament at the 1979 SEA Games was held from 22 to 24 September 1979 at the Gema Sumantri Hall in Jakarta, Indonesia.

== Schedule ==
All times are West Indonesia Time (UTC+07:00)

Date	Time	Event
Saturday, 22 September	14:00	Semi-final
Sunday, 23 September	14:00	Semi-final
Monday, 23 September	18:00	Gold medal match

== Bracket ==
Semi-finals
Indonesia (INA)	5
Burma (BIR)	0
Malaysia (MAL)	2
Thailand (THA)	3

Gold medal match
Indonesia (INA)	5
Thailand (THA)	0

== Semi-finals ==
=== Indonesia vs Burma ===
Indonesia
5
Gema Sumantri Hall
22 September 1979, 14:00

Burma
0

			1	2	3
1	(Indonesia) (Myanmar)	Verawaty Wiharjo; Thida Aye Nyo
2	(Indonesia) (Myanmar)	Ivana Lie; Khin Khin Aye
3	(Indonesia) (Myanmar)	Imelda Wiguna / Verawaty Wiharjo; Thida Aye Nyo / Mya Lay Sein
4	(Indonesia) (Myanmar)	Theresia Widiastuti / Ruth Damayanti; Khin Khin Aye / Kyaw Kyaw
5	(Indonesia) (Myanmar)	Tjan So Gwan; Mya Lay Sein

=== Thailand vs Malaysia ===
Thailand
3
Gema Sumantri Hall
23 September 1979, 14:00

Malaysia
2

			1	2	3
1	(Thailand) (Malaysia)	Sirisriro Patama; Khaw Mooi Eng	11; 1	11; 3
2	(Thailand) (Malaysia)	Thongkam Kingmanee; Clare Choo	5; 11	11; 3	11; 2
3	(Thailand) (Malaysia)	Suleeporn Jittariyakul / Sirisriro Patama; Khaw Mooi Eng / Leong Chai Lean	15; 1	15; 5
4	(Thailand) (Malaysia)	Thongkam Kingmanee / Kanitta Mansamuth; Katherine Teh / Juliet Poon				w/o
5	(Thailand) (Malaysia)	Phanwad Jinasuyanont; Leong Chai Lean				w/o

== Gold medal match ==
=== Indonesia vs Thailand ===
Indonesia
3
Gema Sumantri Hall
24 September 1979, 18:00

Thailand
0

			1	2	3
1	(Indonesia) (Thailand)	Verawaty Wiharjo; Sirisriro Patama	11; 3	11; 1
2	(Indonesia) (Thailand)	Ivana Lie; Thongkam Kingmanee	11; 7	11; 4
3	(Indonesia) (Thailand)	Imelda Wiguna / Verawaty Wiharjo; Suleeporn Jittariyakul / Sirisriro Patama	15; 8	15; 6
4	(Indonesia) (Thailand)	Theresia Widiastuti / Ruth Damayanti; Thongkam Kingmanee / Kanitta Mansamuth				not played
5	(Indonesia) (Thailand)	Tjan So Gwan; Phanwad Jinasuyanont				not played

== See also ==
- Individual event tournament
- Men's team tournament
