= Sinnayah Sabapathy =

Malaysian sprinter (1947–2022)

Personal information
- Nationality: Malaysian
- Born: 30 November 1947 Seremban, Malaysia
- Died: 14 December 2022 (aged 75) Seremban, Malaysia

Sport
- Sport: Sprinting
- Event: 4 × 400 metres relay

Sinnayah Sabapathy (30 November 1947 – 14 December 2022) was a Malaysian sprinter and coach. He competed in the men's 4 × 400 metres relay at the 1972 Summer Olympics.

Sabapathy won the silver medal in the men's 200m at the 1973 Southeast Asian Peninsular Games.

Sabapathy suffered from Alzheimer's disease in later years. He died in Seremban on 14 December 2022, at the age of 75.

== External links ==
- Man of the Hour (2019)
