= Malaysia at the 1977 SEA Games =

Malaysia at the 1977 Southeast Asian Games
- IOC code: MAS
- NOC: Olympic Council of Malaysia
- Website: www.olympic.org.my (in English)

in Kuala Lumpur
- Competitors: 381 in 18 sports
- Medals Ranked 5th: Gold 21 Silver 17 Bronze 21 Total 59

Southeast Asian Games appearances (overview)
- 1959; 1961; 1965; 1967; 1969; 1971; 1973; 1975; 1977; 1979; 1981; 1983; 1985; 1987; 1989; 1991; 1993; 1995; 1997; 1999; 2001; 2003; 2005; 2007; 2009; 2011; 2013; 2015; 2017; 2019; 2021; 2023; 2025; 2027; 2029

Malaysia competed in the 1977 Southeast Asian Games as the host nation in Kuala Lumpur from 19 to 26 November 1977.

== Medal summary ==
=== Medals by sport ===
Sport	Gold	Silver	Bronze	Total	Rank
Archery	0	3	4	7	5
Athletics	12	0	0	12	
Badminton	1	3	2	6	2
Basketball	1	1	0	2	1
Football	1	0	0	1	1
Table tennis	0	0	3	3	3
Total	21	17	21	59	5

=== Medallists ===
Medal	Name	Sport	Event
Gold	Sukninder Singh	Athletics	Men's 400 metres
Gold	Ishtiaq Mubarak	Athletics	Men's 110 metres hurdles
Gold	Simit Bolkiah	Athletics	Men's 400 metres hurdles
Gold	Baljit Singh Sidhu	Athletics	Men's high jump
Gold	Ballang Lasung	Athletics	Men's javelin throw
Gold	Vellasamy Subramaniam	Athletics	Men's 10,000 metres track walk
Gold	Khoo Chong Beng	Athletics	Men's 20 kilometres walk
Gold		Athletics	Men's 4 × 400 metres relay
Gold	Marina Chin Leng Sim	Athletics	Women's 100 metres hurdles
Gold	Marina Chin Leng Sim	Athletics	Women's 200 metres hurdles
Gold	Law Kiu Ee	Athletics	Women's 400 metres hurdles
Gold	Kalaimaney Sengany	Athletics	Women's 10,000 metres track walk
Gold	Sylvia Ng	Badminton	Women's singles
Gold	Malaysia national basketball team	Basketball	Women's tournament
Gold	Malaysia national football team: R. Arumugam; Abdul Rashid Hassan; Yahya Yusof; Soh Chin Aun; Santokh Singh; Nik Pauzi; Reduan Abdullah; Abdah Alif; Shukor Salleh; Yip Chee Keong; Bakri Ibni; Isa Bakar; Wan Rashid; James Wong; Mokhtar Dahari; Jamal Nasir; D. Davendran; Wong Hung Nung; Abdullah Ali; James Jaacob	Football	Men's tournament
Silver	Cheng Jun	Archery	Men's individual recurve 30 metre
Silver	Cheng Jun	Archery	Men's individual recurve 90 metre
Silver	Cheryl Ng	Archery	Women's individual recurve 70 metre
Silver	Rosalind Singha Ang; Sylvia Ng	Badminton	Women's doubles
Silver		Badminton	Mixed doubles
Silver	Malaysia national badminton team	Badminton	Women's team
Silver	Malaysia national basketball team	Basketball	Men's tournament
Bronze		Archery	Men's team recurve
Bronze	Cheng Jun	Archery	Men's individual recurve
Bronze	Cheng Jun	Archery	Men's individual recurve 70 metre
Bronze	Cheryl Ng	Archery	Women's individual recurve
Bronze	James Selvaraj	Badminton	Men's singles
Bronze	Malaysia national badminton team	Badminton	Men's team
Bronze	Peong Tah Seng	Table tennis	Men's singles
Bronze	Peong Tah Seng; Tay Tong Kee	Table tennis	Men's doubles
Bronze	Tan Sok Hong	Table tennis	Women's singles

== Football ==
=== Men's tournament ===
Group A

Team	Pld	W	D	L	GF	GA	GD	Pts
Indonesia	3	2	1	0	7	2	+5	5
Malaysia	3	2	0	1	13	2	+11	4
Philippines	3	1	1	1	5	7	−2	3
Brunei	3	0	0	3	1	15	−14	0

19 November 1977

Malaysia	1 – 2	Indonesia
Abdah Alif 88'		Iswadi Idris 28'; Hadi Ismanto 82'

Stadium Merdeka, Kuala Lumpur

21 November 1977

Malaysia	5 – 0	Philippines

Stadium Merdeka, Kuala Lumpur

23 November 1977

Malaysia	7 – 0	Brunei

Stadium Merdeka, Kuala Lumpur

Semifinal

25 November 1977

Malaysia	9 – 1	Burma
James Wong 2'; Mokhtar Dahari 8' 29' (pen.) 39' 86' 88'; Isa Bakar 56' 62'; Bakri Ibni 83'		Aye Maung 42' (pen.)

Stadium Merdeka, Kuala Lumpur

Gold medal match

26 November 1977

Malaysia	2 – 0	Thailand
Bakri Ibni 11'; Mokhtar Dahari 68'

Stadium Merdeka, Kuala Lumpur
