= Samphon Mao =

Cambodian athlete

Personal information
- Nationality: Cambodian
- Born: 9 December 1949 (age 76)

Sport
- Sport: Sprinting
- Event: 100 metres

Samphon Mao (born 9 December 1949) is a Cambodian sprinter. He competed in the men's 100 metres at the 1972 Summer Olympics.
