= 1979 Thomas Cup =

1979 Thomas Cup Piala Thomas 1979
Tournament details
- Dates: 24 May – 2 June 1979
- Edition: 11th
- Level: International
- Nations: 5
- Venue: Istora Senayan
- Location: Jakarta, Indonesia

The 1979 Thomas Cup was the 11th edition of the Thomas Cup competition, the world championship of men's international team badminton. The final rounds contested by qualifying zone winners and defending champions Indonesia were held at the Istora Senayan in Jakarta, Indonesia in late May and early June. First played in 1948–49, the Thomas Cup competition was held every three years until 1982, and since then has been held every two years.

Indonesia won its seventh title after beating Denmark in the final round.

== Qualification ==
21 teams from 4 regions took part in the competition. As defending champion, Indonesia skipped the Qualifications and the first round, and played directly in the second round (semifinal) of the Inter-Zone Ties.

Means of qualification	Date	Venue	Slot	Qualified teams
1976 Thomas Cup	25 May – 5 June 1976	Bangkok	1	Indonesia
Asian Zone	24–25 February 1979	Kuala Lumpur	1	India
American Zone	13 January 1979 – 28 February 1979	Lima; Ottawa	1	Canada
European Zone	19 October 1978 – 18 February 1979	Brussels; Carlisle; Haarlem; Heerlen; Oslo; Sunderland; Umeå	1	Denmark
Australasian Zone	27 August – 24 September 1978	Invercargill; Perth	1	Japan
Total			5	

Political disputes played a significant role in the 1978–1979 Thomas Cup series. Though the People's Republic of China had been producing players of astonishing ability since the mid-1960s, its entry into the International Badminton Federation (now the Badminton World Federation) had been delayed for years over the Taiwan issue. In 1978 the PRC took the step of fostering a rival international badminton organization and running its own version of a world championship (for individual players) in 1979.

The Asian zone all but disappeared in the political upheaval, as four national teams, including traditionally strong Thailand, either withdrew or were scratched from the competition. This left only India to visit Malaysia in a replay of their 1976 tie (team match), which Malaysia had won after trailing 1–4. Those young Malaysians had gone on to reach the tournament final but none had since developed into true world-class stars. Thus India, on the strength of three wins by Prakash Padukone, was able to avenge its 1976 loss in another extremely close contest (5–4) and win the Asian zone for the first time since 1955.

Competing in the Australasian zone for the first time since the 1966-1967 series, Japan encountered strong opposition from host New Zealand but survived 5–4. It was Richard Purser's sixth Thomas Cup campaign for the Kiwis. The Japanese then went on to shut out Australia in the zone final, despite some close matches.

In the European Zone, England could not take advantage of a fine performance by Ray Stevens (winning only matches where he participated), and went down to Sweden 3–6. The Swedes, however, were beaten in the final for the fourth consecutive time by Denmark 2–7. It was the last of five occasions in which Denmark's Svend Pri and Sweden's Sture Johnsson played on opposite sides of a Thomas Cup tie, though they did not play directly against each other this time. Young Morten Frost for Denmark and Thomas Kihlstrom for Sweden were the leading performers in the contest.

The fallout over these developments reached into the Pan American zone of Thomas Cup which Taiwan (Republic of China) had entered. Drawing Mexico, Taiwan agreed to drop out of the competition when the Mexican Association protested against its entry. Mexico then defaulted the zone final to Canada which, effectively, won the zone by squeezing past the USA in the semifinal 5–4. In nine Thomas Cup meetings between Canada and the United States it was the first time in which no player over 30 participated in the tie.

== Knockout stage ==
The following teams, shown by region, qualified for the 1979 Thomas Cup. Defending champion and host Indonesia automatically qualified to defend their title.

=== Bracket ===
First round
Indonesia
Bye
24 May 1979 – Jakarta
Canada	1
Japan	8
Denmark
Bye
Bye
India

Second round
28 May 1979 – Jakarta
Indonesia	9
Japan	0
26 May 1979 – Jakarta
Denmark	7
India	2

Challenge round
1 June 1979 – Jakarta
Indonesia	9
Denmark	0

=== First round ===
24 May 1979
25 May 1979

Canada	1–8	Japan
Report

Istora Senayan, Indonesia

=== Second round ===
26 May 1979
27 May 1979

Denmark	7–2	India
Report

Istora Senayan, Indonesia

28 May 1979
29 May 1979

Indonesia	9–0	Japan
Report

Istora Senayan, Indonesia

=== Final ===
Though probably not anticipated at the time, this was the final Thomas Cup appearance of the great Indonesian doubles team of Tjun Tjun and Johan Wahjudi, Tjun Tjun being unbeaten in three campaigns which included an appearance in singles. His equally illustrious contemporary, Christian Hadinata, would play in three more series (through 1986) and lose only one match in his Thomas Cup career. Hartono would play in one more series (1981-1982), the first in which Indonesia's great rival China would finally compete. As for Svend Pri, this was his final Thomas Cup tie and the only one in which he failed to win at least one match.

1 June 1979
2 June 1979

Indonesia	9–0	Denmark
Report

Istora Senayan, Indonesia

1979 Thomas Cup winner

Indonesia
Seventh title
