= Savin Chem =

Cambodian sprinter

Personal information
- Nationality: Cambodian
- Born: 11 November 1943 (age 82)

Sport
- Sport: Sprinting
- Event: 400 metres

Savin Chem (born 11 November 1943) is a Cambodian sprinter. He competed in the men's 400 metres at the 1972 Summer Olympics.
