= Baba Singhe Peyadesa =

Malaysian sprinter

Personal information
- Nationality: Malaysian
- Born: 7 April 1947 (age 79)

Sport
- Sport: Sprinting
- Event: 4 × 400 metres relay

Baba Singhe Peyadesa DSPN (born 7 April 1947) is a Malaysian sprinter. He competed in the men's 4 × 400 metres relay at the 1972 Summer Olympics.

== Honours ==
- Penang :
  - Officer of the Order of the Defender of State (DSPN) – Dato' (2022)
