= Kinji Zeniya =

Japanese badminton player

Personal information
- Born: 13 March 1953 (age 73) Kaga, Ishikawa, Japan

Sport
- Country: Japan
- Sport: Badminton
Medal record
Men's badminton
Representing Japan
Asian Championships
Bronze medal – third place	1976 Hyderabad	Men's team

Kinji Zeniya (銭谷 欽治, Zeniya Kinji; born March 13, 1953 in Kaga, Ishikawa) is a retired male badminton player of Japan.

== Career ==
He won seven Japanese national men's singles titles from the mid-1970s to the mid-1980s. He played at the Inter-Zone Ties of 1979 Thomas Cup and 1982 Thomas Cup.

He is a senior official of the Japan national badminton team and Sanyo now.
