= Khoo Chong Beng =

Malaysian racewalker

Personal information
- Nationality: Malaysian
- Born: 5 August 1948 (age 77)

Sport
- Sport: Athletics
- Event: Racewalking
Medal record
Men's athletics
Representing Malaysia
Asian Championships
Gold medal – first place	1975 Seoul	20 km walk
Bronze medal – third place	1973 Marikina	20 km walk

Khoo Chong Beng (born 5 August 1948) is a Malaysian racewalker. He competed in the men's 20 kilometres walk at the 1976 Summer Olympics.
