= Masao Tsuchida =

Japanese badminton player

Personal information
- Born: 9 September 1953 (age 73)
- Height: 1.73 m (5 ft 8 in)
- Weight: 64 kg (141 lb)

Sport
- Country: Japan
- Sport: Badminton
Medal record
Men's badminton
Representing Japan
World Cup
Silver medal – second place	1980 Kyoto	Men's singles
Silver medal – second place	1979 Tokyo	Men's doubles
Bronze medal – third place	1980 Kyoto	Men's doubles
Asian Championships
Bronze medal – third place	1976 Hyderabad	Mixed doubles
Bronze medal – third place	1976 Hyderabad	Men's team

Masao Tsuchida (土田 証雄, Tsuchida Masao; born 9 September 1953) is a retired male badminton player from Japan.

== Career ==
He competed at the 1980 IBF World Championships in men's singles and lost to Liem Swie King in quarterfinals.

== Achievements ==
=== World Cup ===
Men's singles
Year	Venue	Opponent	Score	Result	Ref.
1980	Kyoto Prefectural Gymnasium, Kyoto, Japan	(Indonesia) Liem Swie King	6–15, 10–15	Silver	

Men's doubles
Year	Venue	Partner	Opponent	Score	Result	Ref.
1979	Yoyogi National Stadium, Tokyo, Japan	(Japan) Yoshitaka Iino	(Indonesia) Ade Chandra (Indonesia) Christian Hadinata	8–15, 3–15	Silver	
1980	Kyoto Prefectural Gymnasium, Kyoto, Japan	(Japan) Yoshitaka Iino	(Denmark) Flemming Delfs (Denmark) Steen Skovgaard	10–15, 10–15	Bronze	

=== Asian Championships ===
Mixed doubles
Year	Venue	Partner	Opponent	Score	Result
1976	Lal Bahadur Shastri Stadium, Hyderabad, India	(Japan) Mika Ikeda	(China) Fang Kaixiang (China) He Cuiling	18–15, 8–15, 6–15	Bronze

=== International tournaments ===
Men's doubles
Year	Tournament	Partner	Opponent	Score	Result	Ref.
1979	Denmark Open	(Japan) Yoshitaka Iino	(England) David Eddy (England) Eddy Sutton	15–9, 15–7	(gold) Winner	
