= 1976 Thomas Cup =

1976 Thomas Cup โธมัส คัพ 1976
Tournament details
- Dates: 25 May – 5 June 1976
- Edition: 10th
- Level: International
- Nations: 6
- Venue: Indoor Stadium Huamark
- Location: Bangkok, Thailand

The 1976 Thomas Cup was the tenth edition of Thomas Cup, the world championship of men's international team badminton (its female counterpart is the Uber Cup). The final rounds contested by qualifying teams were held in Bangkok, Thailand in late May and early June. First played in 1948–49, the Thomas Cup competition was held every three years after that until 1982 and has been held every two years since. For more details on the format of past and present Thomas Cup competition see Wikipedia's general article on the Thomas Cup.

Indonesia won its sixth title after beating Malaysia in the final round.

== Qualification ==
26 teams from 4 regions took part in the competition. As defending champion, Indonesia skipped the qualifications and played directly in the second round of the inter-zone ties (team matches), effectively the semifinals of the tournament. As host nation to the inter-zone phase of the tournament, Thailand was exempt from qualifications and played directly in the first round of the inter-zone ties.

Means of qualification	Date	Venue	Slot	Qualified teams
Host country	13 July 1975	Bangkok	1	Thailand
1973 Thomas Cup	25 May – 3 June 1973	Jakarta	1	Indonesia
Asian Zone	27 August 1975 – 3 April 1976	Colombo; Kuala Lumpur; Lahore; Ludhiana; Singapore; Tokyo	1	Malaysia
American Zone	13 December 1975 – 15 February 1976	Lima; Manhattan Beach; Mexico City	1	Canada
European Zone	4 November 1975 – 21 March 1976	Copenhagen; Edinburgh; Geldrop; Helsinki; Mariestad	1	Denmark
Australasian Zone	26 September 1975	Hobart	1	New Zealand
Total			6	

Denmark again prevailed in the European zone but only after two tough battles. In the zone semifinal against England. Flemming Delfs and Elo Hansen led the way to a 6–3 victory, as Svend Pri, recovering from injury, was kept out of the doubles. Englishman David Eddy's unbeaten record in Thomas Cup play for England dating from the 1969-1970 series was broken in the second set of doubles matches, but only after the outcome of the tie had been determined. In the zone final against Sweden, which had beaten West Germany comfortably, Denmark's slightly greater depth enabled it to survive 5–4 in the last match of the tie. Veteran singles star Sture Johnsson still excelled for Sweden, but its team now depended most on Thomas Kihlstrom, something of a late bloomer, but fast becoming one of the best all-around players in the world.

Canada won the Pan American zone by defeating the USA and Mexico, both by 6–3 scores. Against the USA it swept the five singles matches to more than offset a doubles deficit. It was almost the reverse against Mexico, with Canada losing three of the five singles but sweeping the doubles. Notable in the tie between Canada and the USA was the creditable play of a bevy of ultra-veterans: Wayne Macdonnell (who won two singles matches), Channarong Ratanaseangsuang, and Raphi Kanchanaraphi, for Canada, all in their mid to late thirties, and 44-year-old Jim Poole for the U.S. In the Canada versus Mexico tie, Mexico's Roy Diaz Gonzalez, playing in his third Cup series at only 22, remained undefeated in Pan American zone singles

With Iran and Taiwan defaulting opening ties in the Australasian zone, New Zealand needed only to defeat Australia (9–0; though some matches were close) to advance to the inter-zone playoffs for the second time. It was the fifth campaign for New Zealand's Richard Purser whose Thomas Cup experience dated from the days when Australia had the upper hand between the two.

The Asian zone, usually the most formidable one in the Thomas Cup draw, seemed to offer better odds to dark-horse contenders this time. Indonesia as defending champion was once again exempt from the qualifying rounds, as was 1973 zone winner Thailand as host nation to the inter-zone ties. The typically talented Malaysian and Japanese squads were each in something of an intergenerational transition. Malaysia's well known players of the late 1960s and early 1970s had all retired and Ippei Kojima was the last mainstay from Japan's highly competitive teams of 1967 and 1970. Nonetheless, Japan easily advanced over Hong Kong and South Korea in the eastern section of the draw. In the western section India relied on 20-year-old Prakash Padukone's wins in both of his singles and both of his doubles matches to narrowly defeat an improved Pakistan 5–4. In the next round, against a very young and green Malaysian team, three Padukone wins put India on the verge of victory at 4–1. Malaysia, however, won all the remaining matches, the last when Padukone and Asif Parpia were beaten in three games by Cheah Hong Chong and Dominic Soong, to advance to the zone final. There the young Malaysians defeated Japan 6–3, thus helping to assuage the memory of Malaysia's collapse in the zone final against Thailand in 1973.

== Knockout stage ==
The following teams, shown by region, qualified for the 1976 Thomas Cup. Defending champion Indonesia automatically qualified to defend their title.

=== Bracket ===
First round
Denmark
Bye
25 May 1976 – Bangkok
New Zealand	3
Malaysia	6
27 May 1976 – Bangkok
Thailand	9
Canada	0
Bye
Indonesia

Second round
29 May 1976 – Bangkok
Denmark	4
Malaysia	5
31 May 1976 – Bangkok
Thailand	1
Indonesia	8

Challenge round
4 June 1976 – Bangkok
Malaysia	0
Indonesia	9

=== First round ===
25 May 1976
26 May 1976

Malaysia	6–3	New Zealand
Report

Indoor Stadium Huamark, Thailand

27 May 1976
28 May 1976

Thailand	9–0	Canada
Report

Indoor Stadium Huamark, Thailand

=== Second round ===
29 May 1976
30 May 1976

Denmark	4–5	Malaysia
Report

Indoor Stadium Huamark, Thailand

31 May 1976
1 June 1976

Indonesia	8–1	Thailand
Report

Indoor Stadium Huamark, Thailand

=== Final ===
4 June 1976
5 June 1976

Indonesia	9–0	Malaysia
Report

Indoor Stadium Huamark, Thailand

1976 Thomas Cup winner

Indonesia
Sixth title
