= Saw Swee Leong =

Malaysian badminton player (born 1955)

Saw Swee Leong 苏瑞龙
Personal information
- Born: 16 July 1955 (age 71) Penang, Federation of Malaya

Sport
- Country: Malaysia
- Sport: Badminton
- Handedness: Right
Medal record
Men's badminton
Representing Malaysia
Thomas Cup
Silver medal – second place	1976 Bangkok	Team
Commonwealth Games
Bronze medal – third place	1978 Edmonton	Mixed team
Southeast Asian Games
Silver medal – second place	1979 Jakarta	Men's team
Silver medal – second place	1981 Manilla	Men's team
Bronze medal – third place	1977 Kuala Lumpur	Men's team

Saw Swee Leong (born 16 July 1955 in Penang) is a former Malaysian professional badminton player.

== Career ==
Saw Swee Leong supported the Malaysian National Team in the 1976 Thomas Cup. The team made it to the finals before losing to Indonesia by a nine to zero final tally.

Six years later, the team ended up in fifth place in the 1982 Thomas Cup. Losing 5:4 against England in the quarterfinals.

Between the two men's team championships Saw Swee Leong participated in the men's singles at the World Cup in 1980, was defeated there but equal in his opening match against Syed Modi from India.

== Sporting achievements ==
Season	Event	Discipline	Place
1976	Thomas Cup	Men's Team	2
1980	World Cup	Men's Single	33
1982	Thomas Cup	Men's Team	5
