= James Selvaraj =

Personal information
- Born: 21 November 1950 (age 75) Selangor, Malaysia

Sport
- Country: Malaysia
- Sport: Badminton
- Handedness: Right
- Event: Men's Singles & Men's Doubles
Medal record
Men's badminton
Representing Malaysia
Thomas Cup
| Silver medal – second place | 1976 Bangkok | Men's team |
Commonwealth Games
| Bronze medal – third place | 1978 Edmonton | Mixed team |
SEA Games
| Silver medal – second place | 1973 Singapore | Men's team |
| Silver medal – second place | 1975 Bangkok | Men's team |
| Silver medal – second place | 1979 Jakarta | Men's team |
| Bronze medal – third place | 1977 Kuala Lumpur | Men's team |
| Bronze medal – third place | 1977 Kuala Lumpur | Men's singles |

Dato' James Selvaraj Joseph DPTJ (born 21 November 1950) is a Malaysian former badminton player and coach.

== Badminton career ==
James was a former national shuttler during the mid-1970s to early 1980s. He was a national singles champion for three consecutive years from 1974 to 1976. In the 1975/76 Thomas Cup series, he was a member of the team who were runner-up to Indonesia. Among his other achievements were a bronze medal at the 1977 SEA Games in Kuala Lumpur and a bronze medal at the 1978 Commonwealth Games in Edmonton.

== Post-retirement ==
James was the national badminton coach from 1982 to 1985 and Badminton Association of Malaysia (BAM) High Performance Director from 2010 to 2012.

== Achievement ==
=== SEA Games ===
Men's singles

| Year | Venue | Opponent | Score | Result |
|---|---|---|---|---|
| 1977 | Stadium Negara, Kuala Lumpur, Malaysia | (Thailand) Surapong Suharitamrong | 15–10, 15–11 | Bronze |

== Honour ==
=== Honours of Malaysia ===
- Negeri Sembilan
  - Knight Commander of the Grand Order of Tuanku Ja’afar (D.P.T.J.) - Dato' (2005)
