= Badminton at the 1973 SEAP Games – Individual event =

Event at 1973 SEAP Games

Tournament details
- Dates: 2–5 September 1973
- Venue: Singapore Badminton Hall
- Location: Singapore City, Singapore

Champions
- Men's singles: (Malaysia) Punch Gunalan
- Women's singles: (Malaysia) Sylvia Ng
- Men's doubles: (Thailand) Bandid Jaiyen (Thailand) Sangob Rattanusorn
- Women's doubles: (Malaysia) Rosalind Singha Ang (Malaysia) Sylvia Ng
- Mixed doubles: (Thailand) Pornchai Sakuntaniyom (Thailand) Thongkam Kingmanee

The individual events for badminton at the 1973 SEAP Games will be held from 2 to 5 September 1973 at the Singapore Badminton Hall, Singapore City, Singapore.

== Men's singles ==
=== Seeds ===
1. (Thailand) Bandid Jaiyen (bronze medalist)
2. (Malaysia) Tan Aik Mong (silver medalist)

=== Draw ===
First round
1	(Thailand) Bandid Jaiyen	18	15
(Singapore) Ng Chor Yau	16	6
(Malaysia) Punch Gunalan	w/o
(Myanmar) San Myint
(Cambodia) Heng Sinuon	1	1
(Thailand) Chaisak Thongdejsri	15	15
(Singapore) Ahmad Abu Bakar Baghrib	10	16
2	(Malaysia) Tan Aik Mong	15	18

Quarter-final
1	(Thailand) Bandid Jaiyen
?
(Malaysia) Punch Gunalan
(Cambodia) Sek Sampoing
(Cambodia) Sek Sampoing
(Thailand) Chaisak Thongdejsri
(Myanmar) Kyi Nyunt
2	(Malaysia) Tan Aik Mong

Semi-final
1	(Thailand) Bandid Jaiyen	5	6
(Malaysia) Punch Gunalan	15	15
(Thailand) Chaisak Thongdejsri	8	1
2	(Malaysia) Tan Aik Mong	15	15

Final
(Malaysia) Punch Gunalan	15	15
2	(Malaysia) Tan Aik Mong	8	11
Third place
1	(Thailand) Bandid Jaiyen
(Thailand) Chaisak Thongdejsri

== Women's singles ==
=== Seeds ===
1. (Malaysia) Sylvia Ng (gold medalist)
2. ?

=== Draw ===
First round
1	(Malaysia) Sylvia Ng	11	11
(Singapore) Lim Choo Eng	3	6
(Myanmar) Myint Myint Khin	11	11
(Cambodia) Noun Phally	0	0
(Myanmar) Khin Than Nwe	11	11
(Singapore) Leong Kay Sine	7	2
(Cambodia) Thi Do My Lanh	0	2
(Malaysia) Rosalind Singha Ang	11	11

Quarter-final
1	(Malaysia) Sylvia Ng
?
(Thailand) Thongkam Kingmanee
(Myanmar) Myint Myint Khin
(Myanmar) Khin Than Nwe	9	7
(Thailand) Sumol Chanklum	12	11
?
(Malaysia) Rosalind Singha Ang

Semi-final
1	(Malaysia) Sylvia Ng	11	11
(Thailand) Thongkam Kingmanee	5	3
(Thailand) Sumol Chanklum	3	9
(Malaysia) Rosalind Singha Ang	11	12

Final
1	(Malaysia) Sylvia Ng	11	11
(Malaysia) Rosalind Singha Ang	1	3
Third place
(Thailand) Thongkam Kingmanee	w/o
(Thailand) Sumol Chanklum

== Men's doubles ==
=== Seeds ===
1. ?
2. ?
3. ?
4. ?

=== Draw ===
First round
(Thailand) Bandid Jaiyen (Thailand) Sangob Rattanusorn	w/o
(Cambodia) Heng Siphan (Cambodia) Sek Sampoing
(Malaysia) Moo Foot Lian (Malaysia) Tan Aik Mong	w/o
(Myanmar) Kyi Myint (Myanmar) San Myint

Quarter-final
(Thailand) Bandid Jaiyen (Thailand) Sangob Rattanusorn
? ?
(Malaysia) Moo Foot Lian (Malaysia) Tan Aik Mong	9	12
(Singapore) Lee Ah Ngo (Singapore) Tan Khee Wee	15	15
(Cambodia) Heng Sinuon (Cambodia) Smas Slayman	4	1
(Thailand) Chirasak Champakao (Thailand) Pornchai Sakuntaniyom	15	15
(Singapore) Ahmad Abu Bakar Baghrib (Singapore) Chan Kong Ming	3	5
(Malaysia) Punch Gunalan (Malaysia) Dominic Soong	15	15

Semi-final
(Thailand) Bandid Jaiyen (Thailand) Sangob Rattanusorn	15	15
(Singapore) Lee Ah Ngo (Singapore) Tan Khee Wee	12	8
(Thailand) Chirasak Champakao (Thailand) Pornchai Sakuntaniyom	3	2
(Malaysia) Punch Gunalan (Malaysia) Dominic Soong	15	15

Final
(Thailand) Bandid Jaiyen (Thailand) Sangob Rattanusorn	15	18
(Malaysia) Punch Gunalan (Malaysia) Dominic Soong	10	15
Third place
(Singapore) Lee Ah Ngo (Singapore) Tan Khee Wee	4	15	11
(Thailand) Chirasak Champakao (Thailand) Pornchai Sakuntaniyom	15	4	15

== Women's doubles ==
=== Seeds ===
1. ?
2. ?
3. ?
4. ?

=== Draw ===
First round
(Malaysia) Rosalind Singha Ang (Malaysia) Sylvia Ng	17	15
(Myanmar) Khin Than Nwe (Myanmar) Myint Myint Khin	16	3
(Thailand) Sumol Chanklum (Thailand) Pachara Pattabongse	15	15	15
(Singapore) Juliana Lee (Singapore) Leong Kaye Peng	16	2	3
(Singapore) Leong Kaye Sine (Singapore) Lim Choo Eng	11	15	15
(Malaysia) Sylvia Tan (Malaysia) Katherine Teh	15	8	9
(Cambodia) Nuon Phally (Cambodia) Thi Do My Lanh	0	1
(Thailand) Thongkam Kingmanee (Thailand) Sirisriro Patama	15	15

Semi-final
(Malaysia) Rosalind Singha Ang (Malaysia) Sylvia Ng	15	15
(Thailand) Sumol Chanklum (Thailand) Pachara Pattabongse	2	3
(Singapore) Leong Kaye Sine (Singapore) Lim Choo Eng	11	7
(Thailand) Thongkam Kingmanee (Thailand) Sirisriro Patama	15	15

Final
(Malaysia) Rosalind Singha Ang (Malaysia) Sylvia Ng	15	15
(Thailand) Thongkam Kingmanee (Thailand) Sirisriro Patama	2	5
Third place
(Thailand) Sumol Chanklum (Thailand) Pachara Pattabongse	15	15
(Singapore) Leong Kaye Sine (Singapore) Lim Choo Eng	8	3

== Mixed doubles ==
=== Seeds ===
1. ?
2. ?
3. ?
4. ?

=== Draw ===
World Badminton reported that Singaporean pair Koh Peng Hon and Faridah Noh reached the finals. But, the Straits Times reported that the pair were eliminated in the quarter-finals (1st round).

First round
(Thailand) Chirasak Champakao (Thailand) Pachara Pattabongse	15	8	18
(Malaysia) Dominic Soong (Malaysia) Rosalind Singha Ang	6	15	13
(Singapore) Yeo Ah Seng (Singapore) Tan Chor Kiang	15	15
(Cambodia) Him Kim Ly (Cambodia) Noun Phally	1	4
(Singapore) Koh Peng Hon (Singapore) Faridah Noh	5	9
(Thailand) Pornchai Sakuntaniyom (Thailand) Thongkam Kingmanee	15	15
(Cambodia) Smas Slayman (Cambodia) Thi Do My Lanh	5	2
(Malaysia) Punch Gunalan (Malaysia) Sylvia Ng	15	15

Semi-final
(Thailand) Chirasak Champakao (Thailand) Pachara Pattabongse	15	15
(Singapore) Yeo Ah Seng (Singapore) Tan Chor Kiang	7	2
(Thailand) Pornchai Sakuntaniyom (Thailand) Thongkam Kingmanee	15	15
(Malaysia) Punch Gunalan (Malaysia) Sylvia Ng	13	7

Final
(Thailand) Chirasak Champakao (Thailand) Pachara Pattabongse	15	15
(Thailand) Pornchai Sakuntaniyom (Thailand) Thongkam Kingmanee	11	5
Third place
(Singapore) Yeo Ah Seng (Singapore) Tan Chor Kiang	5	6
(Malaysia) Punch Gunalan (Malaysia) Sylvia Ng	15	15

== See also ==
- Men's team tournament
- Women's team tournament
