= Badminton at the 1973 SEAP Games – Men's team =

Badminton – Men's team at the 1973 Southeast Asian Peninsular Games
- Venue: Singapore Badminton Hall
- Dates: 2–4 September 1973

Medalists
gold medal	Thailand (THA)
silver medal	Malaysia (MAL)
bronze medal	Singapore (SIN)

The men's team badminton tournament at the 1973 SEAP Games was held from 2 to 3 September 1973 at the Singapore Badminton Hall, Singapore.

== Schedule ==
All times are Singapore Standard Time (UTC+07:30)

Date	Time	Event
Sunday, 2 September	09:00	Semi-final
Sunday, 3 September	09:00	Bronze medal match
Monday, 4 September	19:40	Gold medal match

== Bracket ==
Semi-finals
Thailand (THA)	3
Singapore (SIN)	2
Khmer Republic (KHM)	0
Malaysia (MAL)	3

Gold medal match
Thailand (THA)	3
Malaysia (MAL)	2
Bronze medal match
Singapore (SIN)	3
Khmer Republic (KHM)	0

== Semi-finals ==
=== Thailand vs Singapore ===
Thailand
3
Singapore Badminton Hall
2 September 1973 09:00 7:30

Singapore
2

			1	2	3
1	(Thailand) (Singapore)	Chaisak Thongdejsri; Lee Ah Ngo	12; 12	13; 15	5; 15
2	(Thailand) (Singapore)	Sangob Rattanusorn; Ng Chor Yau	15; 5	4; 15	12; 15
3	(Thailand) (Singapore)	Chirasak Champakao / Pornchai Sakuntaniyom; Lee Ah Ngo / Tan Khee Wee	15; 5	15; 4
4	(Thailand) (Singapore)	Sangob Rattanusorn / Sila-U-Lao; Ahmad Abu Bakar Baghrib / Chan Kong Ming	15; 9	15; 10
5	(Thailand) (Singapore)	Pornchai Sakuntaniyom; Ahmad Abu Bakar Baghrib	15; 1	15; 1

=== Khmer vs Malaysia ===
Khmer Republic
0
Singapore Badminton Hall
2 September 1973 09:00 7:30

Malaysia
3

			1	2	3
1	(Cambodia) (Malaysia)	Heng Sinoun; Tan Aik Mong	2; 15	2; 15
2	(Cambodia) (Malaysia)	Heng Siphan; Moo Foot Lian	3; 15	8; 15
3	(Cambodia) (Malaysia)	Heng Sinoun / Smas Slayman; Punch Gunalan / Dominic Soong	3; 15	5; 15
4	(Cambodia) (Malaysia)	Heng Siphan / Sek Sampoing; Moo Foot Lian / Tan Aik Mong				not played
5	(Cambodia) (Malaysia)	Sek Sampoing; Dominic Soong				not played

== Bronze medal match ==
=== Singapore vs Khmer ===
Singapore
3
Singapore Badminton Hall
3 September 1973 09:00 7:30

Khmer Republic
0

			1	2	3
1	(Singapore) (Cambodia)	Ng Chor Yau; Sek Sampoing	15; 7	15; 7
2	(Singapore) (Cambodia)	Lee Ah Ngo; Smas Slayman	11; 15	15; 7	15; 13
3	(Singapore) (Cambodia)	Ahmad Abu Bakar Baghrib / D V Thangamany; Heng Siphan / Sek Sampoing	15; 0	15; 8
4	(Singapore) (Cambodia)	Lee Ah Ngo / Tan Khee Wee; Heng Sinoun / Smas Slayman				not played
5	(Singapore) (Cambodia)	Ahmad Abu Bakar Baghrib; Heng Siphan				not played

== Gold medal match ==
=== Thailand vs Malaysia ===
Thailand
3
Singapore Badminton Hall
4 September 1973 19:40 7:30

Malaysia
2

			1	2	3
1	(Thailand) (Malaysia)	Chaisak Thongdejsri; Punch Gunalan	8; 15	2; 15
2	(Thailand) (Malaysia)	Bandid Jaiyen; Tan Aik Mong	15; 12	15; 4
3	(Thailand) (Malaysia)	Bandid Jaiyen / Sangob Rattanusorn; Punch Gunalan / Dominic Soong	7; 15	5; 15
4	(Thailand) (Malaysia)	Chirasak Champakao / Pornchai Sakuntaniyom; Moo Foot Lian / Tan Aik Mong	12; 15	15; 6	15; 5
5	(Thailand) (Malaysia)	Sangob Rattanusorn; Moo Foot Lian	15; 8	17; 16

== See also ==
- Individual event tournament
- Women's team tournament
