= Badminton at the 1975 SEAP Games – Men's team =

Badminton – Men's team at the 1975 Southeast Asian Peninsular Games
- Venue: Indoor Stadium Huamark, Bangkok, Thailand
- Dates: 10 – 11 December 1975
- Nations: 4

Medalists
gold medal	Thailand (THA)
silver medal	Malaysia (MAL)
bronze medal	Singapore (SIN)

The badminton men's team tournament at the 1975 SEAP Games was held from 10 to 11 December 1975 at Bangkok, Thailand.

== Schedule ==
All times are Thailand Standard Time (UTC+07:00)

Date	Time	Event
Wednesday, 10 December	15:00	Semi-final
Thursday, 11 December	18:00	Bronze medal match
Thursday, 11 December	18:00	Gold medal match

== Bracket ==
Semi-finals
Malaysia (MAL)	3
Burma (BIR)	0
Singapore (SIN)	0
Thailand (THA)	3

Gold medal match
Malaysia (MAL)	1
Thailand (THA)	3
Bronze medal match
Burma (BIR)	1
Singapore (SIN)	3

== Semi-finals ==
=== Malaysia vs Burma ===
Malaysia
3
Indoor Stadium Huamark
10 December 1975, 15:00

Burma
0

			1	2	3
1	(Malaysia) (Myanmar)	Moo Foot Lian; Ko Gyi	8; 15	15; 5	15; 5
2	(Malaysia) (Myanmar)	James Selvaraj; Kyi Myint	15; 10	15; 6
3	(Malaysia) (Myanmar)	Cheah Hong Chong / Dominic Soong; Kyi Myint / Maung Maung	15; 6	15; 10
4	(Malaysia) (Myanmar)	Moo Foot Lian / Phua Ah Hua; San Myint / Wai Nyunt				not played
5	(Malaysia) (Myanmar)	Dominic Soong; San Myint				not played

=== Singapore vs Thailand ===
Singapore
0
Indoor Stadium Huamark
10 December 1975, 15:00

Thailand
3

			1	2	3
1	(Singapore) (Thailand)	Ahmad Abu Bakar Baghrib; Bandid Jaiyen	12; 15	1; 15
2	(Singapore) (Thailand)	Ng Chor Yau; Pichai Kongsirithavorn	7; 15	10; 15
3	(Singapore) (Thailand)	Chan Kong Ming / Tan Eng Han; Pornchai Sakuntaniyom / Preecha Sopajaree	5; 15	2; 15
4	(Singapore) (Thailand)	Ahmad Abu Bakar Baghrib / Ng Chor Yau; Bandid Jaiyen / Pichai Kongsirithavorn				not played
5	(Singapore) (Thailand)	Ahmad Abu Bakar Baghrib; Pornchai Sakuntaniyom				not played

== Bronze medal match ==
=== Burma vs Singapore ===
Burma
1
Indoor Stadium Huamark
11 December 1975, 18:00

Singapore
3

			1	2	3
1	(Myanmar) (Singapore)	Ko Gyi; Ahmad Abu Bakar Baghrib	15; 5	12; 15	9; 15
2	(Myanmar) (Singapore)	Wai Nyunt; Ng Chor Yau	10; 15	7; 15
3	(Myanmar) (Singapore)	Ko Gyi / Maung Maung; Chan Kong Ming / Tan Eng Han	15; 10	10; 15	15; 12
4	(Myanmar) (Singapore)	San Myint / Wai Nyunt; D V Thangamany / Ng Chor Yau	8; 15	9; 15
5	(Myanmar) (Singapore)	San Myint; Ahmad Abu Bakar Baghrib				not played

== Gold medal match ==
=== Malaysia vs Thailand ===
Malaysia
1
Indoor Stadium Huamark
11 December 1975, 18:00

Thailand
3

			1	2	3
1	(Malaysia) (Thailand)	Moo Foot Lian; Bandid Jaiyen	8; 15	3; 15
2	(Malaysia) (Thailand)	James Selvaraj; Pichai Kongsirithavorn	13; 18	9; 15
3	(Malaysia) (Thailand)	Cheah Hong Chong / Dominic Soong; Pornchai Sakuntaniyom / Preecha Sopajaree	15; 9	15; 8
4	(Malaysia) (Thailand)	Moo Foot Lian / Phua Ah Hua; Bandid Jaiyen / Pichai Kongsirithavorn	5; 15	4; 15
5	(Malaysia) (Thailand)	Dominic Soong; Pornchai Sakuntaniyom				not played

== See also ==
- Individual event
- Women's team tournament
