= Badminton at the 1975 SEAP Games – Individual event =

Event at 1975 SEAP Games

Tournament details
- Dates: 13–15 December 1975
- Location: Bangkok, Thailand

Champions
- Men's singles: (Thailand) Bandid Jaiyen
- Women's singles: (Malaysia) Sylvia Ng
- Men's doubles: (Thailand) Pornchai Sakuntaniyom (Thailand) Preecha Sopajaree
- Women's doubles: (Malaysia) Rosalind Singha Ang (Malaysia) Sylvia Ng
- Mixed doubles: (Malaysia) Dominic Soong (Malaysia) Rosalind Singha Ang

The individual events for badminton at the 1975 SEAP Games were held from 13 to 15 December 1975 at Bangkok, Thailand.

== Men's singles ==
=== Seeds ===
1. ?
2. ?

=== Draw ===
First round
(Thailand) Bandid Jaiyen	18	15
(Myanmar) Ko Gyi	16	10
(Malaysia) Cheah Hong Chong	15	15
(Singapore) Ng Chor Yau	8	5
(Singapore) Ahmad Abu Bakar Baghrib	9	11
(Thailand) Pichai Kongsirithavorn	15	15
(Myanmar) Kyi Nyunt	15	12	13
(Malaysia) Moo Foot Lian	5	15	15

Semi-final
(Thailand) Bandid Jaiyen	15	15
(Malaysia) Cheah Hong Chong	4	3
(Thailand) Pichai Kongsirithavorn	15	9	15
(Malaysia) Moo Foot Lian	7	15	6

Final
(Thailand) Bandid Jaiyen	10	15	15
(Thailand) Pichai Kongsirithavorn	15	5	5

== Women's singles ==
=== Seeds ===
1. ?
2. ?

=== Draw ===
First round
(Malaysia) Sylvia Ng	7	11	11
(Singapore) Peh Ah Bee	11	0	7
(Thailand) Sirisriro Patama	11	11
(Myanmar) Aye Aye Myint	6	4
(Myanmar) Mya Lay Sein	5	0
(Malaysia) Ong Ah Hong	11	11
(Singapore) Leong Kaye Sine	0	4
(Thailand) Thongkam Kingmanee	11	11

Semi-final
(Malaysia) Sylvia Ng	11	8	11
(Thailand) Sirisriro Patama	8	11	4
(Malaysia) Ong Ah Hong	6	8
(Thailand) Thongkam Kingmanee	11	11

Final
(Malaysia) Sylvia Ng	11	12
(Thailand) Thongkam Kingmanee	1	9

== Men's doubles ==
=== Seeds ===
1. ?
2. ?
3. ?
4. ?

=== Draw ===
First round
(Thailand) Bandid Jaiyen (Thailand) Pichai Kongsirithavorn	15	12	16
(Malaysia) Cheah Hong Chong (Malaysia) Dominic Soong	11	15	17
(Singapore) Ng Chor Yau (Singapore) Tan Eng Han	12	10
(Myanmar) Ko Gyi (Myanmar) Maung Maung	15	15
(Myanmar) Kyi Nyunt (Myanmar) Wai Nyunt	5	6
(Singapore) Ahmad Abu Bakar Baghrib (Singapore) Chan Kong Meng	15	15
(Malaysia) Moo Foot Lian (Malaysia) Phua Ah Hua	8	13
(Thailand) Pornchai Sakuntaniyom (Thailand) Preecha Sopajaree	15	15

Semi-final
(Malaysia) Cheah Hong Chong (Malaysia) Dominic Soong	15	15
(Myanmar) Ko Gyi (Myanmar) Maung Maung	7	3
(Singapore) Ahmad Abu Bakar Baghrib (Singapore) Chan Kong Meng	12	15
(Thailand) Pornchai Sakuntaniyom (Thailand) Preecha Sopajaree	15	18

Final
(Malaysia) Cheah Hong Chong (Malaysia) Dominic Soong	10	4
(Thailand) Pornchai Sakuntaniyom (Thailand) Preecha Sopajaree	15	15

== Women's doubles ==
=== Seeds ===
1. ?
2. ?
3. ?
4. ?

=== Draw ===
First round
(Thailand) Pornthip Boonthanom (Thailand) Suleeporn Jittariyakul	15	15
(Singapore) Cindy Cheong (Singapore) Peh Ah Bee	11	1
(Singapore) Leong Kaye Peng (Singapore) Leong Kaye Sine	4	13
(Myanmar) Aye Aye Myint (Myanmar) Mya Lay Sein	15	18
(Malaysia) Ong Ah Hong (Malaysia) Yap Hei Lin	15	2	4
(Thailand) Thongkam Kingmanee (Thailand) Sirisriro Patama	9	15	15

Semi-final
(Malaysia) Rosalind Singha Ang (Malaysia) Sylvia Ng	9	15	18
(Thailand) Pornthip Boonthanom (Thailand) Suleeporn Jittariyakul	15	10	16
(Myanmar) Aye Aye Myint (Myanmar) Mya Lay Sein	15	13	4
(Thailand) Thongkam Kingmanee (Thailand) Sirisriro Patama	9	15	15

Final
(Malaysia) Rosalind Singha Ang (Malaysia) Sylvia Ng	15	15
(Thailand) Thongkam Kingmanee (Thailand) Sirisriro Patama	5	3

== Mixed doubles ==
=== Seeds ===
1. ?
2. ?
3. ?
4. ?

=== Draw ===
First round
(Malaysia) Dominic Soong (Malaysia) Rosalind Singha Ang
? ?
(Thailand) Pornchai Sakuntaniyom (Thailand) Thongkam Kingmanee
? ?
? ?
(Thailand) Preecha Sopajaree (Thailand) Sawanpim Saithong
? ?
(Malaysia) Cheah Hong Chong (Malaysia) Sylvia Ng

Semi-final
(Malaysia) Dominic Soong (Malaysia) Rosalind Singha Ang	13	15	15
(Thailand) Pornchai Sakuntaniyom (Thailand) Thongkam Kingmanee	15	10	5
(Thailand) Preecha Sopajaree (Thailand) Sawanpim Saithong	4	15	11
(Malaysia) Cheah Hong Chong (Malaysia) Sylvia Ng	15	6	15

Final
(Malaysia) Dominic Soong (Malaysia) Rosalind Singha Ang	15	15
(Malaysia) Cheah Hong Chong (Malaysia) Sylvia Ng	5	4

== See also ==
- Men's team tournament
- Women's team tournament
