= Badminton at the 1975 SEAP Games – Women's team =

Badminton – Women's team at the 1975 Southeast Asian Peninsular Games
- Dates: 10 – 11 December 1975
- Nations: 3

Medalists
gold medal	Malaysia (MAL)
silver medal	Thailand (THA)
bronze medal	Singapore (SIN)

The badminton women's team tournament at the 1975 SEAP Games was held from 10 to 11 December 1975 at Bangkok, Thailand.

== Schedule ==
All times are Thailand Standard Time (UTC+07:00)

Date	Time	Event
Thursday, 11 December	09:00	Thailand vs Singapore
Thursday, 11 December	18:00	Malaysia vs Singapore
Friday, 12 December	18:00	Thailand vs Malaysia

== Round robin ==
Pos	Team	Pld	W	L	MF	MA	MD	GF	GA	GD	PF	PA	PD	Pts	Qualification
1	Malaysia	2	2	0	6	0	+6	10	7	+3	163	77	+86	2	Gold medal
2	Thailand	2	1	1	3	3	0	7	6	+1	132	108	+24	1	Silver medal
3	Singapore	2	0	2	0	6	−6	1	13	−12	69	171	−102	0	Bronze medal

Source: NewspaperSG

=== Thailand vs Singapore ===
Thailand
3
Indoor Stadium Huamark
10 December 1975, 09:00

Singapore
0

			1	2	3
1	(Thailand) (Singapore)	Thongkam Kingmanee; Leong Kaye Sine	11; 2	11; 2
2	(Thailand) (Singapore)	Sirisriro Patama; Peh Ah Bee	11; 0	12; 11
3	(Thailand) (Singapore)	Thongkam Kingmanee / Sirisriro Patama; Leong Kaye Peng / Leong Kaye Sine	15; 6	15; 8
4	(Thailand) (Singapore)	Porntip Buntanon / Suleeporn Jittariyakul; Cindy Cheong / Peh Ah Bee				not played
5	(Thailand) (Singapore)	Suleeporn Jittariyakul; Cindy Cheong				not played

=== Singapore vs Malaysia ===
Singapore
0
Indoor Stadium Huamark
10 December 1975, 18:00

Malaysia
3

			1	2	3
1	(Singapore) (Malaysia)	Peh Ah Bee; Sylvia Ng	12; 10	5; 11	3; 11
2	(Singapore) (Malaysia)	Cindy Cheong; Ong Ah Hong	4; 11	7; 11
3	(Singapore) (Malaysia)	Leong Kaye Peng / Leong Kaye Sine; Rosalind Singha Ang / Sylvia Ng	5; 15	4; 15
4	(Singapore) (Malaysia)	Cindy Cheong / Peh Ah Bee; Ong Ah Hong / Yap Hei Lin				not played
5	(Singapore) (Malaysia)	Leong Kaye Sine; Rosalind Singha Ang				not played

=== Thailand vs Malaysia ===
Thailand
0
Indoor Stadium Huamark
11 December 1975, 18:00

Malaysia
3

			1	2	3
1	(Thailand) (Malaysia)	Sirisriro Patama; Sylvia Ng	9; 11	8; 11
2	(Thailand) (Malaysia)	Thongkam Kingmanee; Ong Ah Hong	11; 5	6; 11	6; 11
3	(Thailand) (Malaysia)	Thongkam Kingmanee / Sirisriro Patama; Rosalind Singha Ang / Sylvia Ng	8; 15	9; 15
4	(Thailand) (Malaysia)	Porntip Buntanon / Suleeporn Jittariyakul; Ong Ah Hong / Yap Hei Lin				not played
5	(Thailand) (Malaysia)	Suleeporn Jittariyakul; Rosalind Singha Ang				not played

== See also ==
- Individual event
- Men's team tournament
