= Badminton at the 1975 SEAP Games =

SEA Games event

Badminton at the 1975 Southeast Asian Peninsular Games
- Venue: Indoor Stadium Huamark
- Location: Bangkok, Thailand
- Dates: 9 – 16 December 1975
- Nations: 5

Badminton events for the 1975 SEAP Games were held at Thai capital of Bangkok between 9 and 16 December 1975. At the end of the competitions, Malaysia stood top by winning four gold medals while host Thailand won gold in three events.

== Medal table ==
* Host nation (Thailand)

Rank	Nation	Gold	Silver	Bronze	Total
1	Malaysia	4	3	3	10
2	Thailand*	3	4	4	11
3	Singapore	0	0	3	3
4	Burma	0	0	2	2
Totals (4 entries)		7	7	12	26

== Medalists ==
Event	Gold	Silver	Bronze
Men's singles	Bandid Jaiyen; Thailand	Pichai Kongsirithavorn; Thailand	Cheah Hong Chong; Malaysia
Men's singles	Bandid Jaiyen; Thailand	Pichai Kongsirithavorn; Thailand	Moo Foot Lian; Malaysia
Women's singles	Sylvia Ng; Malaysia	Thongkam Kingmanee; Thailand	Ong Ah Hong; Malaysia
Women's singles	Sylvia Ng; Malaysia	Thongkam Kingmanee; Thailand	Sirisriro Patama; Thailand
Men's doubles	Pornchai Sakuntaniyom; Preecha Sopajaree; Thailand	Cheah Hong Chong; Dominic Soong; Malaysia	Ahmad Abu Bakar Baghrib; Chan Kong Ming; Singapore
Men's doubles	Pornchai Sakuntaniyom; Preecha Sopajaree; Thailand	Cheah Hong Chong; Dominic Soong; Malaysia	Ko Gyi; Maung Maung; Burma
Women's doubles	Rosalind Singha Ang; Sylvia Ng; Malaysia	Thongkam Kingmanee; Sirisriro Patama; Thailand	Aye Aye Myint; Mya Lay Sein; Burma
Women's doubles	Rosalind Singha Ang; Sylvia Ng; Malaysia	Thongkam Kingmanee; Sirisriro Patama; Thailand	Pornthip Boonthanom; Suleeporn Jittariyakul; Thailand
Mixed doubles	Dominic Soong; Rosalind Singha Ang; Malaysia	Cheah Hong Chong; Sylvia Ng; Malaysia	Pornchai Sakuntaniyom; Thongkam Kingmanee; Thailand
Mixed doubles	Dominic Soong; Rosalind Singha Ang; Malaysia	Cheah Hong Chong; Sylvia Ng; Malaysia	Preecha Sopajaree; Sawanpim Saithong; Thailand
Men's team	Thailand; Bandid Jaiyen; Pichai Kongsirithavorn; Pornchai Sakuntaniyom; Preecha Sopajaree	Malaysia; Moo Foot Lian; Phua Ah Hua; James Selvaraj; Dominic Soong	Singapore; Ahmad Abu Bakar Baghrib; Chan Kong Ming; Ng Chor Yau; Tan Eng Han
Women's team	Malaysia; Rosalind Singha Ang; Sylvia Ng; Ong Ah Hong; Yap Hei Lin	Thailand; Porntip Buntanon; Suleeporn Jittariyakul; Thongkam Kingmanee; Sirisriro Patama	Singapore; Cindy Cheong; Leong Kay Peng; Leong Kay Sine; Peh Ah Bee
