= Badminton at the 1969 SEAP Games =

SEA Games event

Badminton at the 1969 Southeast Asian Peninsular Games
- Venue: Aung San National Indoor Stadium
- Location: Rangoon, Burma
- Dates: 6 – 13 December
- Nations: 6

Badminton events for the 1969 SEAP Games were held at Rangoon, Burma, between 6 and 13 December 1969. Competitions for only individual disciplines was conducted. Myint Myint Khin & Khin Than Nwe (Burma, Women's doubles) finished fourth. Malaysia won all five gold medals.

== Medalists ==
Event	Gold	Silver	Bronze
Men's singles	Punch Gunalan; Malaysia	Soonchai Akyapisut; Thailand	Kyi Nyunt; Burma
Men's singles	Punch Gunalan; Malaysia	Soonchai Akyapisut; Thailand	San Myint; Burma
Women's singles	Rosalind Singha Ang; Malaysia	Khin Than Nwe; Burma	Boopha Kaenthong; Thailand
Women's singles	Rosalind Singha Ang; Malaysia	Khin Than Nwe; Burma	Myint Myint Khin; Burma
Men's doubles	Punch Gunalan; Yew Cheng Hoe; Malaysia	Thongchai Phongful; Singha Siribanterng; Thailand	Kyaw Zaw Wai; Aung Tun; Burma
Men's doubles	Punch Gunalan; Yew Cheng Hoe; Malaysia	Thongchai Phongful; Singha Siribanterng; Thailand	Soe Nyunt; Wai Nyunt; Burma
Women's doubles	Rosalind Singha Ang; Teoh Siew Yong; Malaysia	Khaw Gaik Bee; Sylvia Ng; Malaysia	Boopha Kaenthong; Mulliga Phitakarnop; Thailand
Women's doubles	Rosalind Singha Ang; Teoh Siew Yong; Malaysia	Khaw Gaik Bee; Sylvia Ng; Malaysia	Myint Myint Khin; Khin Than Nwe; Burma
Mixed doubles	Ng Boon Bee; Rosalind Singha Ang; Malaysia	Yew Cheng Hoe; Khaw Gaik Bee; Malaysia	Bandid Jaiyen; Pachara Pattabongse; Thailand
Mixed doubles	Ng Boon Bee; Rosalind Singha Ang; Malaysia	Yew Cheng Hoe; Khaw Gaik Bee; Malaysia	Chirasak Champakao; Sumol Chanklum; Thailand

== Final results ==
Discipline	Winner	Finalist	Score
Men's singles	(Malaysia) Punch Gunalan	(Thailand) Soon Akayapisud	15–2, 15–4
Women's singles	(Malaysia) Sylvia Ng	(Myanmar) Khin Than Nwe	8–11, 11–7, 11–2
Men's doubles	(Malaysia) Punch Gunalan & Yew Cheng Hoe	(Thailand) Thongchai Phongful & Singha Siribanterng	15–8, 15–9
Women's doubles	(Malaysia) Rosalind Singha Ang & Teoh Siew Yong	(Malaysia) Khaw Gaik Bee & Sylvia Ng	15–8, 15–12
Mixed doubles	(Malaysia) Ng Boon Bee & Rosalind Singha Ang	(Malaysia) Yew Cheng Hoe & Khaw Gaik Bee	17–18, 18–17, retired

== Medal table ==
* Host nation (Burma)

Rank	Nation	Gold	Silver	Bronze	Total
1	Malaysia (MAS)	5	2	0	7
2	Thailand (THA)	0	2	4	6
3	Burma (BIR)*	0	1	6	7
Totals (3 entries)		5	5	10	20

== Sources ==
- Lew Hon Kin: SEA Games Records 1959–1985, Petaling Jaya – Penerbit Pan Earth, 1986
