= Sylvia Ng =

Malaysian badminton player (born 1949)

Sylvia Ng 黃妙英
Personal information
- Born: 24 September 1949 (age 77) Johor Bahru, Johor, Malaysia

Sport
- Country: Malaysia
- Sport: Badminton
- Coached by: Roland Ng
Medal record
Women's badminton
Representing Malaysia
Commonwealth Games
Gold medal – first place	1978 Edmonton	Women's singles
Bronze medal – third place	1974 Christchurch	Women's singles
Bronze medal – third place	1974 Christchurch	Women's doubles
Bronze medal – third place	1978 Edmonton	Mixed team
Asian Games
Gold medal – first place	1970 Bangkok	Mixed doubles
Bronze medal – third place	1970 Bangkok	Women's singles
Southeast Asian Games
Gold medal – first place	1969 Rangoon	Women's singles
Gold medal – first place	1973 Singapore	Women's singles
Gold medal – first place	1973 Singapore	Women's doubles
Gold medal – first place	1973 Singapore	Women's team
Gold medal – first place	1975 Bangkok	Women's singles
Gold medal – first place	1975 Bangkok	Women's doubles
Gold medal – first place	1975 Bangkok	Women's team
Gold medal – first place	1977 Kuala Lumpur	Women's singles
Silver medal – second place	1969 Rangoon	Women's doubles
Silver medal – second place	1975 Bangkok	Mixed doubles
Silver medal – second place	1977 Kuala Lumpur	Women's doubles
Silver medal – second place	1977 Kuala Lumpur	Women's team
Bronze medal – third place	1973 Singapore	Mixed doubles

Sylvia Ng Meow Eng (born 24 September 1949 in Johor Bahru) is a former badminton player from Malaysia. She was inducted into the Olympic Council of Malaysia's Hall of Fame in 2004.

== Career ==
Her major international success in 1969 was at the Southeast Asia Games in Rangoon, where she won the women's singles. Four years later, she was again successful in the same event in women's singles. In 1970, she won the mixed doubles at the Belgian International partnering Ng Boon Bee. At the Asian Games in 1970 she was also successful with Ng Boon Bee in Mixed Doubles and finished third in the Women's Singles. Again with Boon Bee she won a year later at the Canadian Open in the Mixed Doubles category.

At the Commonwealth Games in 1974, she won the bronze medal in women's doubles together with Rosalind Singha Ang. In the Asian Games 1974, she finished without a medal. In 1977 she won another gold at the Southeast Asian Games held in Kuala Lumpur. She also won a Commonwealth Games gold for women's singles in 1978.

Sylvia was Malaysia's Sportswoman of the Year twice in 1975 & 1978.

4 August 2023 – In conjunction with the 64th birthday celebration of the Sultan of Pahang Al-Sultan Abdullah Ri'ayatuddin Al-Mustafa Billah Shah, Sylvia was conferred the Darjah Indera Mahkota Pahang (DIMP) award that carries the title 'Dato' '. The investiture ceremony was held at Istana Abu Bakar, Pekan.

== Achievements ==
=== Asian Games ===
Women singles
Year	Venue	Opponent	Score	Result
1970	Kittikachorn Stadium, Bangkok, Thailand	(Thailand) Thongkam Kingmanee	7–11, 4–11	Bronze

Mixed doubles
Year	Venue	Partner	Opponent	Score	Result
1970	Kittikachorn Stadium, Bangkok, Thailand	(Malaysia) Ng Boon Bee	(Thailand) Bandid Jaiyen (Thailand) Achara Pattabongs	18–13, 11–15, 15–10	Gold

=== Southeast Asian Peninsular Games/Southeast Asian Games ===
Women's singles
Year	Venue	Opponent	Score	Result
1969	Yangon, Myanmar	(Myanmar) Khin Than Nwe	8–11, 11–7, 11–2	Gold
1973	Singapore Badminton Stadium, Singapore	(Malaysia) Rosalind Singha Ang	11–1, 11–3	Gold
1975	Bangkok, Thailand	(Thailand) Thongkam Kingmanee	11–1, 12–9	Gold
1977	Stadium Negara, Kuala Lumpur, Malaysia	(Indonesia) Verawaty Wiharjo	4–11, 11–4, 11–5	Gold

Women's doubles
Year	Venue	Partner	Opponent	Score	Result
1969	Rangoon, Myanmar	(Malaysia) Khaw Gaik Bee	(Malaysia) Teoh Siew Yong (Malaysia) Rosalind Singha Ang	8–15, 12–15	Silver
1973	Singapore Badminton Stadium, Singapore	(Malaysia) Rosalind Singha Ang	(Thailand) Thongkam Kingmanee (Thailand) Sirisriro Patama	15–2, 15–5	Gold
1975	Bangkok, Thailand	(Malaysia) Rosalind Singha Ang	(Thailand) Thongkam Kingmanee (Thailand) Sirisriro Patama	15–5, 15–3	Gold
1977	Stadium Negara, Kuala Lumpur, Malaysia	(Malaysia) Rosalind Singha Ang	(Indonesia) Theresia Widiastuti (Indonesia) Regina Masli	2–15, 4–15	Silver

Mixed doubles
Year	Venue	Partner	Opponent	Score	Result
1973	Singapore Badminton Stadium, Singapore	(Malaysia) Punch Gunalan	(Singapore) Yeo Ah Seng (Singapore) Tan Chor Kiang	15–5, 15–6	Bronze
1975	Bangkok, Thailand	(Malaysia) Cheah Hong Chong	(Malaysia) Dominic Soong (Malaysia) Rosalind Singha Ang	5–15, 4–15	Silver

=== Commonwealth Games ===
Women's singles
Year	Venue	Opponent	Score	Result
1974	Cowles Stadium, Christchurch, New Zealand	(England) Susan Whetnall	11–2, 11–8	Bronze
1978	University of Alberta Arena, Edmonton, Canada	(Malaysia) Katherine Teh	11–5, 11–3	Gold

Women's doubles
Year	Venue	Partner	Opponent	Score	Result
1974	Cowles Stadium, Christchurch, New Zealand	(Malaysia) Rosalind Singha Ang	(Canada) Mimi Nilsson (Canada) Judy Rollick	15–2, 15–8	Bronze

=== International tournaments ===
Women's singles
Year	Venue	Opponent	Score	Result
1971	Singapore Open	(Thailand) Thongkam Kingmanee	3–11, 11–9, 11–6	(gold) Winner

Mixed doubles
Year	Venue	Partner	Opponent	Score	Result
1966	Singapore Open	(Malaysia) Billy Ng	(Malaysia) Eddy Choong (Singapore) Lim Choo Eng	17–15, retired	(gold) Winner
1970	Singapore Open	(Malaysia) Ng Boon Bee	(Thailand) Chirasak Champakao (Thailand) Pachara Pattabongse	15–11, 15–12	(gold) Winner
1971	Singapore Open	(Malaysia) Ng Boon Bee	(Thailand) Thongkam Kingmanee (Thailand) Bandid Jaiyen	15–6, 15–9	(gold) Winner
1971	Poona Open	(Malaysia) Ng Boon Bee	(Netherlands) Joke van Beusekom (Netherlands) Piet Ridder	15–4, 15–5	(gold) Winner
1971	Canada Open	(Malaysia) Ng Boon Bee	(Canada) Rolph Patterson (Canada) Mimi Nilsson	15–11, 15–4	(gold) Winner

=== Invitational tournament ===
Women's doubles
Year	Tournament	Partner	Opponent	Score	Result
1976	Asian Invitational Championships	(Malaysia) Rosalind Singha Ang	(Thailand) Kingmanee Thongkam (Thailand) Sirisriro Patama	15–9, 18–14	Gold
1977	Asian Invitational Championships	(Malaysia) Rosalind Singha Ang	(Thailand) Kingmanee Thongkam (Thailand) Sirisriro Patama	15–7, 15–3	Bronze

== Honour ==
- Member of the Order of the Defender of the Realm (A.M.N.) (1982).
