= 2023 BWF World Senior Championships – 70+ =

Tournament details
- Dates: 11 September 2023 – 17 September 2023
- Edition: 11
- Level: International
- Competitors: 80 from 18 nations
- Venue: Hwasan Indoor Stadium; Jeonju Indoor Badminton Hall
- Location: Jeonju, South Korea

Champions
- Men's singles: (Malaysia) Bruni Garip
- Women's singles: (England) Betty Bartlett
- Men's doubles: (Japan) Nobuyuki Aoyama (Japan) Seiji Yamamoto
- Women's doubles: (Japan) Haruko Asakoshi (Japan) Kinuko Manake
- Mixed doubles: (England) Peter Emptage (England) Betty Bartlett

These are the results of 2023 BWF World Senior Championships' 70+ events.

== Competition schedule ==
Women's singles, women's doubles, and mixed doubles' entries were all under 16 entries, was competed in round robin.

#R	Preliminary rounds	GS	Group stage	QF	Quarter-finals	SF	Semi-finals	F	Finals

H	Hwasan Indoor Stadium	J	Jeonju Indoor Badminton Hall

Date	11 Sep		12 Sep		13 Sep		14 Sep		15 Sep	16 Sep	17 Sep
Venue	H	J	H	J	H	J	H	J	H	H	H
Men's singles	1R				2R			3R	QF	SF	F
Women's singles	GS			GS	GS			GS		SF	F
Men's doubles	1R				2R			QF		SF	F
Women's doubles	GS			GS	GS			GS		SF	F
Mixed doubles	GS			GS	GS				QF	SF	F

== Medal summary ==
=== Medal standings ===
* Host nation (South Korea)

2023 BWF World Senior Championships medal table
Rank	Nation	Gold	Silver	Bronze	Total
1	England	2	3	1	6
2	Japan	2	1	3	6
3	Malaysia	1	0	1	2
4	India	0	1	1	2
5	Canada	0	0	1	1
5	South Korea*	0	0	1	1
5	Sweden	0	0	1	1
8	Finland	0	0	0.5	0.5
8	South Africa	0	0	0.5	0.5
Totals (9 entries)		5	5	10	20

=== Medalists ===
Event	Gold	Silver	Bronze
Men's singles	(Malaysia) Bruni Garip	(Japan) Nobuyuki Aoyama	(Sweden) Stefan Ohrås
Men's singles	(Malaysia) Bruni Garip	(Japan) Nobuyuki Aoyama	(Japan) Seiji Yamamoto
Women's singles	(England) Betty Bartlett	(India) Jessie Philip	(India) Susy V. John
Women's singles	(England) Betty Bartlett	(India) Jessie Philip	(Canada) Siew Har Hong
Men's doubles	(Japan) Nobuyuki Aoyama (Japan) Seiji Yamamoto	(England) Peter Emptage (England) Graham Holt	(South Africa) Johan Croukamp (Finland) Carl-Johan Nybergh
Men's doubles	(Japan) Nobuyuki Aoyama (Japan) Seiji Yamamoto	(England) Peter Emptage (England) Graham Holt	(Sweden) Curt Ingedahl (Sweden) Stefan Ohrås
Women's doubles	(Japan) Haruko Asakoshi (Japan) Kinuko Manake	(England) Cathy Alexander (England) Sylvia Gill	(England) Anna Bowskill (England) Sylvia Penn
Women's doubles	(Japan) Haruko Asakoshi (Japan) Kinuko Manake	(England) Cathy Alexander (England) Sylvia Gill	(South Korea) Jeong Jung-hee (South Korea) Park Bok-hee
Mixed doubles	(England) Peter Emptage (England) Betty Bartlett	(England) Graham Michael Robinson (England) Cathy Alexander	(Japan) Nobuyuki Aoyama (Japan) Junko Amo
Mixed doubles	(England) Peter Emptage (England) Betty Bartlett	(England) Graham Michael Robinson (England) Cathy Alexander	(Japan) Hirohisa Toshijima (Japan) Haruko Asakoshi

== Men's singles ==
=== Seeds ===
1. (South Africa) Johan Croukamp (quarter-finals)
2. (Malaysia) Bruni Garip (champion; gold medalists)
3. (Sweden) Curt Ingedahl (quarter-finals)
4. (Canada) Henry Paynter (quarter-finals)
5. (France) Philippe Moucheboeuf (third round)
6. (England) Graham Michael Robinson (second round)
7. (Japan) Seiji Yamamoto (semi-finals; bronze medalists)
8. (Sweden) Stefan Ohrås (semi-finals; bronze medalists)

=== Finals ===
Semi-finals
(Japan) Nobuyuki Aoyama	21	17	21
5/8	(Sweden) Stefan Ohrås	9	21	6
5/8	(Japan) Seiji Yamamoto	11	8
2	(Malaysia) Bruni Garip	21	21

Final
(Japan) Nobuyuki Aoyama	10	13
2	(Malaysia) Bruni Garip	21	21

=== Top half ===
==== Section 1 ====
First round

Second round
1	(South Africa) J Croukamp	21	21
(Germany) K Rosenkranz	10	12
(Thailand) S Chompoonuchprapa	21	19	13
(India) K Chandran	15	21	21
5/8	(England) G M Robinson	19	21
(Japan) N Aoyama	21	23
(Sri Lanka) S J Peti	21	17	22
(Singapore) K Lee	19	21	20

Third round
1	(South Africa) J Croukamp	21	21
(India) K Chandran	16	6
(Japan) N Aoyama	21	21
(Sri Lanka) S J Peti	6	5

Quarter-finals
1	(South Africa) J Croukamp	21	11
(Japan) N Aoyama	23	21

==== Section 2 ====
First round
(Netherlands) H Sterrenburg	13	8
(France) P Premat	21	21

Second round
3/4	(Canada) H Paynter	21	21
(India) U R Abdul Wahab	8	11
(Denmark) N J Madsen	15	14
(South Korea) Lee Y-w	21	21
5/8	(Sweden) S Ohrås	21	16	21
(Thailand) C Hanthanom	7	21	18
(Japan) H Toshijima	21	21
(France) P Premat	14	12

Third round
3/4	(Canada) H Paynter	21	21
(South Korea) Lee Y-w	6	14
5/8	(Sweden) S Ohrås	21	21
(Japan) H Toshijima	9	17

Quarter-finals
3/4	(Canada) H Paynter	21	19	13
5/8	(Sweden) S Ohrås	19	21	21

=== Bottom half ===
==== Section 3 ====
First round
(Germany) C-P Lienig	21	18	21
(South Korea) Lee J-k	17	21	11

Second round
(Germany) C-P Lienig	21	21
(Sri Lanka) R de Silva	19	15
(England) E Hayes	4	2
5/8	(Japan) S Yamamoto	21	21
(India) B Jamir	21	7	19
(Thailand) P Ritipong	19	21	21
(Canada) W Metcalfe
3/4	(Sweden) C Ingedahl	w	/	o

Third round
(Germany) C-P Lienig	12	6
5/8	(Japan) S Yamamoto	21	21
(Thailand) P Ritipong	10	21	9
3/4	(Sweden) C Ingedahl	21	13	21

Quarter-finals
5/8	(Japan) S Yamamoto	21	21
3/4	(Sweden) C Ingedahl	15	15

==== Section 4 ====
First round

Second round
(Thailand) A Dejkraisak	21	14	14
(India) M. L Machettira	16	21	21
(South Korea) Jung H-s	6	13
5/8	(France) P Moucheboeuf	21	21
(Japan) A Hori	21	22	21
(England) D Chapman	19	24	14
(Bulgaria) H Mihalev	5	10
2	(Malaysia) B Garip	21	21

Third round
(India) M. L Machettira	21	21
5/8	(France) P Moucheboeuf	17	15
(Japan) A Hori	3	9
2	(Malaysia) B Garip	21	21

Quarter-finals
(India) M. L Machettira	13	3
2	(Malaysia) B Garip	21	21

== Women's singles ==
=== Seeds ===
1. (England) Betty Bartlett (champion; gold medalists)
2. (England) Sylvia Penn (group satge)

=== Group stage ===
==== Group A ====
Pos	Team	Pld	W	L	GF	GA	GD	PF	PA	PD	Qualification
1	(England) Betty Bartlett [1]	2	2	0	4	0	+4	85	55	+30	Qualification to elimination stage
2	(India) Jessie Philip	2	1	1	2	2	0	78	55	+23	Qualification to elimination stage
3	(India) Nandini Nagarajan	2	0	2	0	4	−4	31	84	−53	

Source: Group A – standings

Date		Score		Game 1	Game 2	Game 3	Venue
Sep 11	Betty Bartlett (England)	2–0	(India) Nandini Nagarajan	21–10	21–9		Hwasan Indoor Stadium
Sep 13	Jessie Philip (India)	2–0	(India) Nandini Nagarajan	21–3	21–9		Hwasan Indoor Stadium
Sep 14	Betty Bartlett (England)	2–0	(India) Jessie Philip	'21–16	22–20		Jeonju Indoor Stadium

==== Group B ====
Pos	Team	Pld	W	L	GF	GA	GD	PF	PA	PD	Qualification
1	(Canada) Siew Har Hong	3	2	1	5	2	+3	134	101	+33	Qualification to elimination stage
2	(India) Susy V. John	3	2	1	5	3	+2	155	118	+37	Qualification to elimination stage
3	(England) Sylvia Penn [2]	3	2	1	4	3	+1	126	104	+22	
4	(India) Shyamola Khanna	3	0	3	0	6	−6	34	126	−92	

Source: Group B – standings

Date		Score		Game 1	Game 2	Game 3	Venue
Sep 12	Shyamola Khanna (India)	0–2	(India) Susy V. John	4–21	7–21		Jeonju Indoor Stadium
Sep 12	Sylvia Penn (England)	0–2	(Canada) Siew Har Hong	8–21	19–21		Jeonju Indoor Stadium
Sep 13	Sylvia Penn (England)	2–1	(India) Susy V. John	15–21	21–16	21–16	Hwasan Indoor Stadium
Sep 13	Shyamola Khanna (India)	0–2	(Canada) Siew Har Hong	2–21	12–21		Hwasan Indoor Stadium
Sep 14	Sylvia Penn (England)	2–0	(India) Shyamola Khanna	21–3	21–6		Jeonju Indoor Stadium
Sep 14	Susy V. John (India)	2–1	(Canada) Siew Har Hong	18–21	21–13	21–16	Jeonju Indoor Stadium

=== Elimination stage ===
Semi-finals
1	(England) Betty Bartlett	21	15	21
(India) Susy V. John	14	21	16
(India) Jessie Philip	21	17	21
(Canada) Siew Har Hong	17	21	14

Final
1	(England) Betty Bartlett	17	21	21
(India) Jessie Philip	21	11	14

== Men's doubles ==
=== Seeds ===
1. (South Africa) Johan Croukamp / (Finland) Carl-Johan Nybergh (semi-finals; bronze medalists)
2. (England) Peter Emptage / Graham Holt (final; silver medalists)
3. (Malaysia) Bruni Garip / Anthony Linggian (second round)
4. (Sweden) Curt Ingedahl / Stefan Ohrås (semi-finals; bronze medalists)

=== Finals ===
Semi-finals
1	(South Africa) Johan Croukamp (Finland) Carl-Johan Nybergh	20	22
(Japan) Nobuyuki Aoyama (Japan) Seiji Yamamoto	22	24
3/4	(Sweden) Curt Ingedahl (Sweden) Stefan Ohrås	18	11
2	(England) Peter Emptage (England) Graham Holt	21	21

Final
(Japan) Nobuyuki Aoyama (Japan) Seiji Yamamoto	21	14	22
2	(England) Peter Emptage (England) Graham Holt	15	21	20

=== Top half ===
==== Section 1 ====
First round
(South Korea) Kim Y-s (South Korea) Lee J-s	18	21	21
(France) P Moucheboeuf (France) P Premat	21	17	11

Second round
1	(South Africa) J Croukamp (Finland) C-J Nybergh	18	22	21
(Thailand) W Palapun (Thailand) P Ritipong	21	20	16
(India) R C Grover (India) B B Gupta	18	21	16
(South Korea) Kim Y-s (South Korea) Lee J-s	21	11	16^{r}

Quarter-finals
1	(South Africa) J Croukamp (Finland) C-J Nybergh	21	21
(India) R C Grover (India) B B Gupta	11	15

==== Section 2 ====
First round
(Thailand) S Chompoonuchprapa (Thailand) C Hanthanom	21	21
(India) P Malagoppa (India) A Sharma	16	16
(Sri Lanka) R de Silva (Indonesia) F H Mainaky	11	19
(Japan) N Aoyama (Japan) S Yamamoto	21	21

Second round
3/4	(Malaysia) B Garip (Malaysia) A Linggian	19	17
(Thailand) S Chompoonuchprapa (Thailand) C Hanthanom	21	21
(England) A Malique (England) G M Robinson	17	23	9
(Japan) N Aoyama (Japan) S Yamamoto	21	21	21

Quarter-finals
(Thailand) S Chompoonuchprapa (Thailand) C Hanthanom	19	23	15
(Japan) N Aoyama (Japan) S Yamamoto	21	21	21

=== Bottom half ===
==== Section 3 ====
First round
(South Korea) Kim D-s (South Korea) Pack G	12	15
(Canada) W Metcalfe (Bulgaria) H Mihalev	21	21
(Denmark) N J Madsen (Netherlands) H Sterrenburg	16	18
(England) D Chapman (England) E Hayes	21	21

Second round
(Canada) W Metcalfe (Bulgaria) H Mihalev	21	21
(Thailand) B Jaiyen (Thailand) P Puangsupang	14	10
(England) D Chapman (England) E Hayes	10	9
3/4	(Sweden) C Ingedahl (Sweden) S Ohrås	21	21

Quarter-finals
(Canada) W Metcalfe (Bulgaria) H Mihalev	14	20
3/4	(Sweden) C Ingedahl (Sweden) S Ohrås	21	22

==== Section 4 ====
First round
(Thailand) A Dejkraisak (Thailand) N Kulsavete	15	6
(India) S K Patet (India) S S Pundir	21	21
(South Korea) Jang Y-s (South Korea) Lee Y-w	14	13
(Germany) C-P Lienig (Germany) K Rosenkranz	21	21

Second round
(India) S K Patet (India) S S Pundir	21	21
(Japan) A Hori (Japan) H Toshijima	15	3
(Germany) C-P Lienig (Germany) K Rosenkranz	10	3
2	(England) P Emptage (England) G Holt	21	21

Quarter-finals
(India) S K Patet (India) S S Pundir	9	17
2	(England) P Emptage (England) G Holt	21	21

== Women's doubles ==
=== Seeds ===
1. (England) Anna Bowskill / Sylvia Penn (semi-finals; bronze medalists)
2. (England) Cathy Alexander / Sylvia Gill (final; silver medalists)

=== Group stage ===
==== Group A ====
Pos	Team	Pld	W	L	GF	GA	GD	PF	PA	PD	Qualification
1	(Japan) Haruko Asakoshi (Japan) Kinuko Manake	3	3	0	6	0	+6	129	86	+43	Qualification to elimination stage
2	(England) Anna Bowskill (England) Sylvia Penn [1]	3	2	1	4	2	+2	114	92	+22	Qualification to elimination stage
3	(India) Susy V. John (India) Jessie Philip	3	1	2	2	4	−2	102	107	−5	
4	(India) Punita Nagalia (India) Gowramma Veeralinga	3	0	3	0	6	−6	66	126	−60	

Source: Group A – standings

Date		Score		Game 1	Game 2	Game 3	Venue
Sep 11	Punita Nagalia (India); Gowramma Veeralinga (India)	0–2	(India) Susy V. John (India) Jessie Philip	14–21	9–21		Hwasan Indoor Stadium
Sep 11	Anna Bowskill (England); Sylvia Penn (England)	0–2	(Japan) Haruko Asakoshi (Japan) Kinuko Manake	8–21	22–24		Hwasan Indoor Stadium
Sep 13	Anna Bowskill (England); Sylvia Penn (England)	2–0	(India) Susy V. John (India) Jessie Philip	21–14	21–17		Hwasan Indoor Stadium
Sep 13	Punita Nagalia (India); Gowramma Veeralinga (India)	0–2	(Japan) Haruko Asakoshi (Japan) Kinuko Manake	15–21	12–21		Hwasan Indoor Stadium
Sep 14	Anna Bowskill (England); Sylvia Penn (England)	2–0	(India) Punita Nagalia (India) Gowramma Veeralinga	21–7	21–9		Jeonju Indoor Stadium
Sep 14	Susy V. John (India); Jessie Philip (India)	0–2	(Japan) Haruko Asakoshi (Japan) Kinuko Manake	13–21	16–21		Jeonju Indoor Stadium

==== Group B ====
Pos	Team	Pld	W	L	GF	GA	GD	PF	PA	PD	Qualification
1	(England) Cathy Alexander (England) Sylvia Gill [2]	3	3	0	6	1	+5	149	103	+46	Qualification to elimination stage
2	(South Korea) Jeong Jung-hee (South Korea) Park Bok-hee	3	2	1	5	3	+2	154	149	+5	Qualification to elimination stage
3	(Thailand) Sukhon Chuboonlap (Thailand) Kanyapha Sucharitphongse	3	1	2	3	4	−1	133	127	+6	
4	(India) Shyamola Khanna (India) Nandini Nagarajan	3	0	3	0	6	−6	69	126	−57	

Source: Group B – standings

Date		Score		Game 1	Game 2	Game 3	Venue
Sep 12	Shyamola Khanna (India); Nandini Nagarajan (India)	0–2	(Thailand) Sukhon Chuboonlap (Thailand) Kanyapha Sucharitphongse	9–21	11–21		Jeonju Indoor Hall
Sep 12	Cathy Alexander (England); Sylvia Gill (England)	2–1	(South Korea) Jeong Jung-hee (South Korea) Park Bok-hee	21–11	22–24	21–13	Jeonju Indoor Stadium
Sep 13	Cathy Alexander (England); Sylvia Gill (England)	2–0	(Thailand) Sukhon Chuboonlap (Thailand) Kanyapha Sucharitphongse	22–20	21–12		Hwasan Indoor Stadium
Sep 13	Shyamola Khanna (India); Nandini Nagarajan (India)	0–2	(South Korea) Jeong Jung-hee (South Korea) Park Bok-hee	12–21	14–21		Hwasan Indoor Stadium
Sep 14	Sukhon Chuboonlap (Thailand); Kanyapha Sucharitphongse (Thailand)	1–2	(South Korea) Jeong Jung-hee (South Korea) Park Bok-hee	22–24	21–19	16–21	Jeonju Indoor Stadium
Sep 14	Cathy Alexander (England); Sylvia Gill (England)	2–0	(India) Shyamola Khanna (India) Nandini Nagarajan	21–14	21–		Jeonju Indoor Stadium

=== Elimination stage ===
Semi-finals
(Japan) Haruko Asakoshi (Japan) Kinuko Manake	18	21	21
1	(England) Anna Bowskill (England) Sylvia Penn	21	12	15
(South Korea) Jeong Jung-hee (South Korea) Park Bok-hee	8	10
2	(England) Cathy Alexander (England) Sylvia Gill	21	21

Final
(Japan) Haruko Asakoshi (Japan) Kinuko Manake	20	21	21
2	(England) Cathy Alexander (England) Sylvia Gill	22	11	16

== Mixed doubles ==
=== Seeds ===
1. (England) Peter Emptage / Betty Bartlett (champion; gold medalists)
2. (Canada) Henry Paynter / Siew Har Hong (group stage)
3. (England) Graham Holt / Sylvia Penn (quarter-finals)
4. (England) Edward Hayes / Sylvia Gill (quarter-finals)

=== Group stage ===
==== Group A ====
Pos	Team	Pld	W	L	GF	GA	GD	PF	PA	PD	Qualification
1	(England) Peter Emptage (England) Betty Bartlett [1]	2	2	0	4	0	+4	84	46	+38	Qualification to elimination stage
2	(Japan) Nobuyuki Aoyama (Japan) Junko Amo	2	1	1	2	3	−1	75	91	−16	Qualification to elimination stage
3	(Thailand) Pongsilpa Ritipong (Thailand) Sukhon Chuboonlap	2	0	2	1	4	−3	73	95	−22	
4	(South Korea) Won Geun-ho (South Korea) Jang Ok-boon (H, Z)	0	0	0	0	0	0	0	0	0	

Source: Group A – standings
(H) Host; (Z) Retired after one match.

Date		Score		Game 1	Game 2	Game 3	Venue
Sep 11	Nobuyuki Aoyama (Japan); Junko Amo (Japan)	2–1	(Thailand) Pongsilpa Ritipong (Thailand) Sukhon Chuboonlap	11–21	21–12	21–16	Hwasan Indoor Stadium
Sep 11	Peter Emptage (England); Betty Bartlett (England)	~~2–0~~	(South Korea) Won Geun-ho (South Korea) Jang Ok-boon	~~21–7~~	~~21–11~~		Hwasan Indoor Stadium
Sep 12	Peter Emptage (England); Betty Bartlett (England)	2–0	(Thailand) Pongsilpa Ritipong (Thailand) Sukhon Chuboonlap	21–8	21–16		Jeonju Indoor Stadium
Sep 12	Nobuyuki Aoyama (Japan); Junko Amo (Japan)	w/o	(South Korea) Won Geun-ho (South Korea) Jang Ok-boon	Walkover			
Sep 13	Peter Emptage (England); Betty Bartlett (England)	2–0	(Japan) Nobuyuki Aoyama (Japan) Junko Amo	21–13	21–9		Hwasan Indoor Stadium
Sep 13	Pongsilpa Ritipong (Thailand); Sukhon Chuboonlap (Thailand)	~~2–0~~	(South Korea) Won Geun-ho (South Korea) Jang Ok-boon	~~21–13~~	~~21–10~~		Hwasan Indoor Stadium

==== Group B ====
Pos	Team	Pld	W	L	GF	GA	GD	PF	PA	PD	Qualification
1	(England) Graham Michael Robinson (England) Cathy Alexander	3	2	1	5	2	+3	131	104	+27	Qualification to elimination stage
2	(Canada) William Metcalfe (India) Jessie Philip	3	2	1	4	2	+2	108	110	−2	Qualification to elimination stage
3	(Canada) Henry Paynter (Canada) Siew Har Hong [2]	3	2	1	4	3	+1	138	109	+29	
4	(Japan) Akira Hori (Japan) Kinuko Manake	3	0	3	0	6	−6	74	128	−54	

Source: Group B – standings

Date		Score		Game 1	Game 2	Game 3	Venue
Sep 11	Akira Hori (Japan); Kinuko Manake (Japan)	0–2	(Canada) William Metcalfe (India) Jessie Philip	9–21	21–23		Hwasan Indoor Stadium
Sep 11	Henry Paynter (Canada); Siew Har Hong (Canada)	2–1	(England) Graham Michael Robinson (England) Cathy Alexander	16–21	21–16	21–10	Hwasan Indoor Stadium
Sep 12	Henry Paynter (Canada); Siew Har Hong (Canada)	0–2	(Canada) William Metcalfe (India) Jessie Philip	19–21	19–21		Jeonju Indoor Hall
Sep 12	Akira Hori (Japan); Kinuko Manake (Japan)	0–2	(England) Graham Michael Robinson (England) Cathy Alexander	10–21	14–21		Jeonju Indoor Hall
Sep 13	Henry Paynter (Canada); Siew Har Hong (Canada)	2–0	(Japan) Akira Hori (Japan) Kinuko Manake	21–14	21–6		Hwasan Indoor Stadium
Sep 13	William Metcalfe (Canada); Jessie Philip (India)	0–2	(England) Graham Michael Robinson (England) Cathy Alexander	13–21	9–21		Hwasan Indoor Stadium

==== Group C ====
Pos	Team	Pld	W	L	GF	GA	GD	PF	PA	PD	Qualification
1	(England) Graham Holt (England) Sylvia Penn [3/4]	3	3	0	6	0	+6	126	67	+59	Qualification to elimination stage
2	(India) Yogendra Kumar Jaiswal (India) Punita Nagalia	3	2	1	4	2	+2	107	94	+13	Qualification to elimination stage
3	(South Korea) Ryu Yeon-hee (South Korea) Choi Ki-soon (H)	3	1	2	2	4	−2	84	120	−36	
4	(Thailand) Wattana Palapun (Thailand) Kanyapha Sucharitphongse	3	0	3	0	6	−6	92	128	−36	

Source: Group C – standings
(H) Host

Date		Score		Game 1	Game 2	Game 3	Venue
Sep 11	Wattana Palapun (Thailand); Kanyapha Sucharitphongse (Thailand)	0–2	(South Korea) Ryu Yeon-hee (South Korea) Choi Ki-soon	21–23	15–21		Hwasan Indoor Stadium
Sep 11	Graham Holt (England); Sylvia Penn (England)	2–0	(India) Yogendra Kumar Jaiswal (India) Punita Nagalia	21–8	21–15		Hwasan Indoor Stadium
Sep 12	Graham Holt (England); Sylvia Penn (England)	2–0	(South Korea) Ryu Yeon-hee (South Korea) Choi Ki-soon	21–13	21–9		Jeonju Indoor Stadium
Sep 12	Wattana Palapun (Thailand); Kanyapha Sucharitphongse (Thailand)	0–2	(India) Yogendra Kumar Jaiswal (India) Punita Nagalia	16–21	18–21		Jeonju Indoor Stadium
Sep 13	Graham Holt (England); Sylvia Penn (England)	2–0	(Thailand) Wattana Palapun (Thailand) Kanyapha Sucharitphongse	21–11	21–11		Hwasan Indoor Stadium
Sep 13	Ryu Yeon-hee (South Korea); Choi Ki-soon (South Korea)	0–2	(India) Yogendra Kumar Jaiswal (India) Punita Nagalia	5–21	13–21		Hwasan Indoor Stadium

==== Group D ====
Pos	Team	Pld	W	L	GF	GA	GD	PF	PA	PD	Qualification
1	(Japan) Hirohisa Toshijima (Japan) Haruko Asakoshi	2	2	0	4	0	+4	84	29	+55	Qualification to elimination stage
2	(England) Edward Hayes (England) Sylvia Gill [3/4]	2	1	1	2	3	−1	76	94	−18	Qualification to elimination stage
3	(Thailand) Nopadol Kulsavete (Thailand) Chompoothip Rojanapunchai	2	0	2	1	4	−3	65	102	−37	
4	(India) Surendra Singh Pundir (India) Susy V. John (Z)	0	0	0	0	0	0	0	0	0	

Source: Group D – standings
(Z) Retired after one match.

Date		Score		Game 1	Game 2	Game 3	Venue
Sep 11	Surendra Singh Pundir (India); Susy V. John (India)	~~2–1~~	(Japan) Hirohisa Toshijima (Japan) Haruko Asakoshi	~~22–20~~	~~18–21~~	~~21–17~~	Hwasan Indoor Stadium
Sep 11	Edward Hayes (England); Sylvia Gill (England)	2–1	(Thailand) Nopadol Kulsavete (Thailand) Chompoothip Rojanapunchai	21–14	18–21	21–17	Hwasan Indoor Stadium
Sep 12	Edward Hayes (England); Sylvia Gill (England)	0–2	(Japan) Hirohisa Toshijima (Japan) Haruko Asakoshi	11–21	5–21		Jeonju Indoor Hall
Sep 12	Surendra Singh Pundir (India); Susy V. John (India)	w/o	(Thailand) Nopadol Kulsavete (Thailand) Chompoothip Rojanapunchai	Walkover			
Sep 13	Edward Hayes (England); Sylvia Gill (England)	~~0–2~~	(India) Surendra Singh Pundir (India) Susy V. John	~~24–26~~	~~14–21~~		
Sep 13	Hirohisa Toshijima (Japan); Haruko Asakoshi (Japan)	2–0	(Thailand) Nopadol Kulsavete (Thailand) Chompoothip Rojanapunchai	21–10	21–3		

=== Elimination stage ===
Quarter-finals
1	(England) Peter Emptage (England) Betty Bartlett	21	21
(India) Yogendra Kumar Jaiswal (India) Punita Nagalia	15	6
3/4	(England) Graham Holt (England) Sylvia Penn	21	18	15
(Japan) Nobuyuki Aoyama (Japan) Junko Amo	16	21	21
3/4	(England) Edward Hayes (England) Sylvia Gill	21	6	10
(Japan) Hirohisa Toshijima (Japan) Haruko Asakoshi	19	21	21
(Canada) William Metcalfe (India) Jessie Philip	21	12	11
(England) Graham Michael Robinson (England) Cathy Alexander	18	21	21

Semi-finals
1	(England) Peter Emptage (England) Betty Bartlett	21	21
(Japan) Nobuyuki Aoyama (Japan) Junko Amo	11	9
(Japan) Hirohisa Toshijima (Japan) Haruko Asakoshi	21	19	15
(England) Graham Michael Robinson (England) Cathy Alexander	13	21	21

Final
1	(England) Peter Emptage (England) Betty Bartlett	21	21
(England) Graham Michael Robinson (England) Cathy Alexander	14	12
