= Malaysia at the 1975 SEAP Games =

Malaysia at the 1975 Southeast Asian Peninsular Games
- IOC code: MAS
- NOC: Olympic Council of Malaysia
- Website: www.olympic.org.my (in English)

in Bangkok
- Competitors: 252 in 17 sports
- Medals Ranked 4th: Gold 27 Silver 49 Bronze 51 Total 127

Southeast Asian Peninsular Games appearances
- 1959; 1961; 1965; 1967; 1969; 1971; 1973; 1975; 1977; 1979; 1981; 1983; 1985; 1987; 1989; 1991; 1993; 1995; 1997; 1999; 2001; 2003; 2005; 2007; 2009; 2011; 2013; 2015; 2017; 2019; 2021; 2023; 2025; 2027; 2029

Malaysia competed in the 1975 Southeast Asian Peninsular Games held in Bangkok, Thailand from 9 to 16 December 1975. It won 27 gold, 49 Silver and 51 bronze medals.

== Medal summary ==
=== Medals by sport ===
Sport	Gold	Silver	Bronze	Total	Rank
Athletics	4	0	0	4	
Badminton	4	3	2	8	1
Football	0	1	0	1	2
Table tennis	2	2	1	5	1
Total	16	49	51	116	4

=== Medallists ===
Medal	Name	Sport	Event
Gold	Nashatar Singh Sidhu	Athletics	Men's javelin throw
Gold	Gladys Chai Ng Mei	Athletics	Women's high jump
Gold	Gladys Chai Ng Mei	Athletics	Women's heptathlon
Gold		Athletics	Women's 4 × 100 metres relay
Gold	Sylvia Ng Meow Eng	Badminton	Women's singles
Gold	Rosalind Singha Ang; Sylvia Ng Meow Eng	Badminton	Women's doubles
Gold	Dominic Soong; Rosalind Singha Ang	Badminton	Mixed doubles
Gold	Malaysia national badminton team: Sylvia Ng Meow Eng; Rosalind Singha Ang; Ong Ah Hong	Badminton	Women's team
Gold	Peong Tah Seng	Table tennis	Men's singles
Gold	Tan Sok Hong	Table tennis	Women's singles
Silver	Cheah Hong Chong; Dominic Soong	Badminton	Men's doubles
Silver	Cheah Hong Chong; Sylvia Ng Meow Eng	Badminton	Mixed doubles
Silver	Malaysia national badminton team: Moo Foot Lian; James Selvaraj; Cheah Hong Chong; Phua Ah Hua; Dominic Soong; Lim Cheng Hoe	Badminton	Men's team
Silver	Malaysia national football team	Football	Men's tournament
Silver	Lim Guat Hoon	Table tennis	Women's singles
Silver	Fan Sim Wai	Table tennis	Men's singles
Bronze	Ong Ah Hong	Badminton	Women's singles
Bronze	Moo Foot Lian	Badminton	Men's singles
Bronze	Soong Poh Wah; Peong Tah Seng	Table tennis	Men's doubles
