= Badminton at the SEA Games =

Badminton competitions at the Southeast Asian Games

Badminton is a SEA Games event and has been one of the sports held at the Games since the inaugural edition of the South East Asian Peninsular Games (SEAP Games) in 1959.

== Summary ==
Games	Year	Host city	Events	Best nation
SEAP Games
I	1959	Bangkok	2	Thailand
II	1961	Rangoon	5	Thailand
III	1965	Kuala Lumpur	7	Malaysia
IV	1967	Bangkok	5	Thailand
V	1969	Rangoon	5	Malaysia
VI	1971	Kuala Lumpur	7	Malaysia
VII	1973	Singapore	7	Malaysia
VIII	1975	Bangkok	7	Malaysia
SEA Games
IX	1977	Kuala Lumpur	7	Indonesia
X	1979	Jakarta	7	Indonesia
XI	1981	Manila	7	Indonesia
XII	1983	Singapore	7	Indonesia
XIII	1985	Bangkok	7	Indonesia
XIV	1987	Jakarta	7	Indonesia
XV	1989	Kuala Lumpur	7	Indonesia
XVI	1991	Manila	7	Indonesia
XVII	1993	Singapore	7	Indonesia
XVIII	1995	Chiang Mai	7	Indonesia
XIX	1997	Jakarta	7	Indonesia
XX	1999	Bandar Seri Begawan	7	Indonesia

Games	Year	Host city	Events	Best nation
XXI	2001	Kuala Lumpur	7	Indonesia
XXII	2003	Ho Chi Minh City	7	Indonesia
XXIII	2005	Pasig	7	Indonesia
XXIV	2007	Nakhon Ratchasima	7	Indonesia
XXV	2009	Vientiane	7	Indonesia
XXVI	2011	Jakarta	7	Indonesia
XXVII	2013	Naypyidaw	5	Indonesia
XXVIII	2015	Singapore	7	Indonesia
XXIX	2017	Kuala Lumpur	7	Thailand
XXX	2019	Muntinlupa	7	Malaysia
XXXI	2021	Bắc Giang	7	Thailand
XXXII	2023	Phnom Penh	8	Indonesia
XXXIII	2025	Pathum Thani	7	Indonesia
XXXIV	2027	Kuala Lumpur		
XXXIV	2029	Singapore		
XXXIV	2031	Laos		
XXXIV	2033	Philippines		

== Medal table ==
As of the 2025 SEA Games

Rank	Nation	Gold	Silver	Bronze	Total
1	Indonesia (INA)	122	83	48	253
2	Malaysia (MAS)	51	64	113	228
3	Thailand (THA)	42	62	113	217
4	Singapore (SGP)	3	9	58	70
5	Cambodia (CAM)	1	1	0	2
6	Myanmar (MYA)	0	2	18	20
7	Vietnam (VIE)	0	0	15	15
8	Philippines (PHI)	0	0	6	6
9	Laos (LAO)	0	0	4	4
10	Brunei (BRU)	0	0	1	1
Totals (10 entries)		219	221	376	816

=== Performances by nation ===
Pos	Nation	MS	WS	MD	WD	XD	MT	WT	XT	Total
1	Indonesia	19	14	17	19	20	19	14	0	122
2	Malaysia	7	10	10	9	6	6	3	0	51
3	Thailand	6	7	6	4	6	3	10	0	42
4	Singapore	1	1	0	0	0	0	1	0	3
5	Cambodia	0	0	0	0	0	0	0	1	1
Total		33	32	33	32	32	28	28	1	219

== Winners ==
Year	Men's singles	Women's singles	Men's doubles	Women's doubles	Mixed doubles
1959	(Thailand) Thanoo Khadjabye	no competition	(Thailand) Charoen Wattanasin (Thailand) Kamal Sudthivanich	no competition	no competition
1961	(Thailand) Channarong Ratanaseangsuang	(Malaysia) Tan Gaik Bee	(Malaysia) Ng Boon Bee (Malaysia) Tan Yee Khan	(Thailand) Sumol Chanklum (Thailand) Pankae Phongarn	(Thailand) Raphi Kanchanaraphi (Thailand) Pankae Phongarn
1965	(Malaysia) Tan Aik Huang	(Malaysia) Rosalind Singha Ang	(Malaysia) Ng Boon Bee (Malaysia) Tan Yee Khan	(Thailand) Pratuang Pattabongse (Thailand) Achara Pattabongse	(Malaysia) Ng Boon Bee (Malaysia) Teoh Siew Yong
1967	(Thailand) Sangob Rattanusorn	(Thailand) Thongkham Kingmanee	(Malaysia) Ng Boon Bee (Malaysia) Tan Yee Khan	(Malaysia) Rosalind Singha Ang (Malaysia) Teoh Siew Yong	(Thailand) Chirasak Champakao (Thailand) Sumol Chanklum
1969	(Malaysia) Punch Gunalan	(Malaysia) Sylvia Ng Meow Eng	(Malaysia) Punch Gunalan (Malaysia) Yew Cheng Hoe	(Malaysia) Rosalind Singha Ang (Malaysia) Teoh Siew Yong	(Malaysia) Ng Boon Bee (Malaysia) Rosalind Singha Ang
1971	(Malaysia) Tan Aik Huang	(Malaysia) Rosalind Singha Ang	(Malaysia) Ng Boon Bee (Malaysia) Punch Gunalan	(Thailand) Thongkam Kingmanee (Thailand) Pachara Pattabongse	(Malaysia) Ng Tat Wai (Malaysia) Teh Mei Ling
1973	(Malaysia) Punch Gunalan	(Malaysia) Sylvia Ng Meow Eng	(Thailand) Sangob Rattanusorn (Thailand) Bandid Jaiyen	(Malaysia) Rosalind Singha Ang (Malaysia) Sylvia Ng Meow Eng	(Thailand) Pornchai Sakuntaniyom (Thailand) Thongkam Kingmanee
1975	(Thailand) Bandid Jaiyen	(Malaysia) Sylvia Ng Meow Eng	(Thailand) Pornchai Sakuntaniyom (Thailand) Preecha Sopajaree	(Malaysia) Rosalind Singha Ang (Malaysia) Sylvia Ng Meow Eng	(Malaysia) Soong Chok Soon (Malaysia) Rosalind Singha Ang
1977	(Indonesia) Liem Swie King	(Malaysia) Sylvia Ng Meow Eng	(Indonesia) Tjun Tjun (Indonesia) Johan Wahjudi	(Indonesia) Regina Masli (Indonesia) Theresia Widiastuti	(Indonesia) Christian Hadinata (Indonesia) Regina Masli
1979	(Indonesia) Hastomo Arbi	(Indonesia) Ivana Lie	(Thailand) Bandid Jaiyen (Thailand) Preecha Sopajaree	(Indonesia) Verawaty Fajrin (Indonesia) Imelda Wiguna	(Indonesia) Christian Hadinata (Indonesia) Imelda Wiguna
1981	(Indonesia) Liem Swie King	(Indonesia) Verawaty Fajrin	(Indonesia) Rudy Heryanto (Indonesia) Kartono	(Indonesia) Ruth Damayanti (Indonesia) Verawaty Fajrin	(Indonesia) Rudy Heryanto (Indonesia) Imelda Wiguna
1983	(Singapore) Wong Shoon Keat	(Indonesia) Ivana Lie	(Indonesia) Bobby Ertanto (Indonesia) Christian Hadinata	(Indonesia) Ruth Damayanti (Indonesia) Maria Fransisca	(Indonesia) Christian Hadinata (Indonesia) Ivana Lie
1985	(Indonesia) Icuk Sugiarto	(Indonesia) Elizabeth Latief	(Malaysia) Jalani Sidek (Malaysia) Razif Sidek	(Indonesia) Rosiana Tendean (Indonesia) Imelda Wiguna	(Indonesia) Christian Hadinata (Indonesia) Imelda Wiguna
1987	(Indonesia) Icuk Sugiarto	(Indonesia) Elizabeth Latief	(Indonesia) Eddy Hartono (Indonesia) Liem Swie King	(Indonesia) Rosiana Tendean (Indonesia) Verawaty Wiharjo	(Indonesia) Eddy Hartono (Indonesia) Verawaty Wiharjo
1989	(Indonesia) Icuk Sugiarto	(Indonesia) Susi Susanti	(Indonesia) Rudy Gunawan (Indonesia) Eddy Hartono	(Indonesia) Erma Sulistianingsih (Indonesia) Rosiana Tendean	(Indonesia) Eddy Hartono (Indonesia) Verawaty Fajrin
1991	(Indonesia) Ardy Wiranata	(Indonesia) Susi Susanti	(Indonesia) Rudy Gunawan (Indonesia) Eddy Hartono	(Indonesia) Erma Sulistianingsih (Indonesia) Rosiana Tendean	(Indonesia) Ricky Subagja (Indonesia) Rosiana Tendean
1993	(Indonesia) Joko Suprianto	(Indonesia) Sarwendah Kusumawardhani	(Malaysia) Cheah Soon Kit (Malaysia) Soo Beng Kiang	(Indonesia) Finarsih (Indonesia) Lili Tampi	(Indonesia) Rudy Gunawan (Indonesia) Eliza Nathanael
1995	(Indonesia) Joko Suprianto	(Indonesia) Susi Susanti	(Malaysia) Cheah Soon Kit (Malaysia) Yap Kim Hock	(Indonesia) Finarsih (Indonesia) Lili Tampi	(Indonesia) Tri Kusharjanto (Indonesia) Minarti Timur
1997	(Indonesia) Hariyanto Arbi	(Indonesia) Mia Audina	(Indonesia) Sigit Budiarto (Indonesia) Candra Wijaya	(Indonesia) Eliza Nathanael (Indonesia) Zelin Resiana	(Indonesia) Candra Wijaya (Indonesia) Eliza Nathanael
1999	(Indonesia) Taufik Hidayat	(Indonesia) Cindana Hartono Kusuma	(Thailand) Tesana Panvisvas (Thailand) Pramote Teerawiwatana	(Indonesia) Etty Tantri (Indonesia) Cynthia Tuwankotta	(Malaysia) Chew Choon Eng (Malaysia) Chor Hooi Yee
2001	(Malaysia) Roslin Hashim	(Thailand) Sujitra Ekmongkolpaisarn	(Indonesia) Sigit Budiarto (Indonesia) Candra Wijaya	(Indonesia) Deyana Lomban (Indonesia) Vita Marissa	(Indonesia) Nova Widianto (Indonesia) Vita Marissa
2003	(Indonesia) Sony Dwi Kuncoro	(Malaysia) Wong Mew Choo	(Malaysia) Choong Tan Fook (Malaysia) Lee Wan Wah	(Indonesia) Jo Novita (Indonesia) Lita Nurlita	(Thailand) Sudket Prapakamol (Thailand) Saralee Thungthongkam
2005	(Indonesia) Sony Dwi Kuncoro	(Indonesia) Adriyanti Firdasari	(Indonesia) Markis Kido (Indonesia) Hendra Setiawan	(Malaysia) Chin Eei Hui (Malaysia) Wong Pei Tty	(Indonesia) Nova Widianto (Indonesia) Liliyana Natsir
2007	(Indonesia) Taufik Hidayat	(Indonesia) Maria Kristin Yulianti	(Indonesia) Markis Kido (Indonesia) Hendra Setiawan	(Indonesia) Vita Marissa (Indonesia) Liliyana Natsir	(Indonesia) Flandy Limpele (Indonesia) Vita Marissa
2009	(Indonesia) Simon Santoso	(Thailand) Salakjit Ponsana	(Indonesia) Markis Kido (Indonesia) Hendra Setiawan	(Malaysia) Chin Eei Hui (Malaysia) Wong Pei Tty	(Indonesia) Nova Widianto (Indonesia) Liliyana Natsir
2011	(Indonesia) Simon Santoso	(Singapore) Fu Mingtian	(Indonesia) Mohammad Ahsan (Indonesia) Bona Septano	(Indonesia) Anneke Feinya Agustin (Indonesia) Nitya Krishinda Maheswari	(Indonesia) Tontowi Ahmad (Indonesia) Liliyana Natsir
2013	(Thailand) Tanongsak Saensomboonsuk	(Indonesia) Bellaetrix Manuputty	(Indonesia) Angga Pratama (Indonesia) Rian Agung Saputro	(Malaysia) Vivian Hoo (Malaysia) Woon Khe Wei	(Indonesia) Muhammad Rijal (Indonesia) Debby Susanto
2015	(Malaysia) Chong Wei Feng	(Thailand) Busanan Ongbumrungpan	(Indonesia) Angga Pratama (Indonesia) Ricky Karanda Suwardi	(Malaysia) Amelia Alicia Anscelly (Malaysia) Soong Fie Cho	(Indonesia) Praveen Jordan (Indonesia) Debby Susanto
2017	(Indonesia) Jonatan Christie	(Malaysia) Goh Jin Wei	(Thailand) Kittinupong Kedren (Thailand) Dechapol Puavaranukroh	(Thailand) Jongkolphan Kititharakul (Thailand) Rawinda Prajongjai	(Thailand) Dechapol Puavaranukroh (Thailand) Sapsiree Taerattanachai
2019	(Malaysia) Lee Zii Jia	(Malaysia) Kisona Selvaduray	(Malaysia) Aaron Chia (Malaysia) Soh Wooi Yik	(Indonesia) Greysia Polii (Indonesia) Apriyani Rahayu	(Indonesia) Praveen Jordan (Indonesia) Melati Daeva Oktavianti
2021	(Thailand) Kunlavut Vitidsarn	(Thailand) Pornpawee Chochuwong	(Indonesia) Leo Rolly Carnando (Indonesia) Daniel Marthin	(Indonesia) Apriyani Rahayu (Indonesia) Siti Fadia Silva Ramadhanti	(Malaysia) Chen Tang Jie (Malaysia) Peck Yen Wei
2023	(Indonesia) Christian Adinata	(Thailand) Supanida Katethong	(Indonesia) Pramudya Kusumawardana (Indonesia) Yeremia Rambitan	(Indonesia) Febriana Dwipuji Kusuma (Indonesia) Amalia Cahaya Pratiwi	(Indonesia) Rehan Naufal Kusharjanto (Indonesia) Lisa Ayu Kusumawati
2025	(Indonesia) Alwi Farhan	(Thailand) Ratchanok Intanon	(Indonesia) Sabar Karyaman Gutama (Indonesia) Muhammad Reza Pahlevi Isfahani	(Malaysia) Pearly Tan (Malaysia) Thinaah Muralitharan	(Thailand) Ruttanapak Oupthong (Thailand) Jhenicha Sudjaipraparat

== Team competition ==
Year	Men	Women	Mixed
1959	no competition		no competition
1961	no competition		no competition
1965	Malaysia	Thailand	no competition
1967	no competition		no competition
1969	no competition		no competition
1971	Malaysia	Thailand	no competition
1973	Thailand	Malaysia	no competition
1975	Thailand	Malaysia	no competition
1977	Indonesia	Indonesia	no competition
1979	Indonesia	Indonesia	no competition
1981	Indonesia	Indonesia	no competition
1983	Indonesia	Indonesia	no competition
1985	Indonesia	Indonesia	no competition
1987	Indonesia	Indonesia	no competition
1989	Malaysia	Indonesia	no competition
1991	Malaysia	Indonesia	no competition
1993	Indonesia	Indonesia	no competition
1995	Indonesia	Indonesia	no competition
1997	Indonesia	Indonesia	no competition
1999	Indonesia	Indonesia	no competition
2001	Malaysia	Indonesia	no competition
2003	Indonesia	Singapore	no competition
2005	Malaysia	Thailand	no competition
2007	Indonesia	Indonesia	no competition
2009	Indonesia	Malaysia	no competition
2011	Indonesia	Thailand	no competition
2013	no competition		no competition
2015	Indonesia	Thailand	no competition
2017	Indonesia	Thailand	no competition
2019	Indonesia	Thailand	no competition
2021	Thailand	Thailand	no competition
2023	Indonesia	Thailand	Cambodia
2025	Indonesia	Thailand	no competition
