= Badminton at the 1973 SEAP Games – Women's team =

Badminton – Women's team at the 1973 Southeast Asian Peninsular Games
- Venue: Singapore Badminton Hall
- Dates: 2–3 September 1973
- Competitors: 3

Medalists
gold medal	Malaysia (MAS)
silver medal	Thailand (THA)
bronze medal	Singapore (SIN)

The women's team badminton tournament at the 1973 SEAP Games was held from 2 to 3 September 1973 at the Singapore Badminton Hall, Singapore.

== Schedule ==
All times are Singapore Standard Time (UTC+07:30)

Date	Time	Event
Sunday, 2 September	09:00	Semi-final
Monday, 3 September	19:00	Gold medal match

== Bracket ==
Semi-finals		Gold medal match
		Malaysia (MAL)	3
		Thailand (THA)	2
Singapore (SIN)	1	Thailand (THA)	2
Thailand (THA)	3

== Semi-finals ==
=== Thailand vs Singapore ===
Thailand
3
Singapore Badminton Hall
2 September 1973 09:00

Singapore
1

			1	2	3
1	(Thailand) (Singapore)	Thongkam Kingmanee; Leong Kay Sine	11; 6	11; 5
2	(Thailand) (Singapore)	Sumol Chanklum; Lim Choo Eng	11; 3	12; 9
3	(Thailand) (Singapore)	Thongkam Kingmanee / Sirisriro Patama; Leong Kay Sine / Lim Choo Eng	11; 15	15; 11	11; 15
4	(Thailand) (Singapore)	Pachara Pattabongse / Sumol Chanklum; Leong Kay Peng / Peh Ah Bee	15; 5	15; 8
5	(Thailand) (Singapore)	Sirisriro Patama; Cindy Cheong				not played

== Gold medal match ==
=== Malaysia vs Thailand ===
Malaysia
3
Singapore Badminton Hall
3 September 1973 19:00

Thailand
2

		1	2	3
1	(Malaysia) (Thailand)
2	(Malaysia) (Thailand)
3	(Malaysia) (Thailand)
4	(Malaysia) (Thailand)
5	(Malaysia) (Thailand)

== See also ==
- Individual event tournament
- Men's team tournament
