= Badminton at the 1974 British Commonwealth Games =

- Venue: Cowles Stadium
- Location: Christchurch, New Zealand
- Dates: 24–31 January 1974

The badminton competition at the 1974 British Commonwealth Games took place in Christchurch, New Zealand from 24 January until 31 January 1974.

The events were held at the Cowles Stadium, which had three courts and a capacity of 2,000 seats.

Paul Whetnall withdrew from the men's singles bronze medal play off and the mixed doubles final due to injury.

Prince Charles attended the final day of the badminton competition, and presented the medals for two of the badminton events.

== Medal table ==
* Host nation (New Zealand)

Rank	Nation	Gold	Silver	Bronze	Total
1	England	4	4	2	10
2	Malaysia	1	0	3	4
3	Canada	0	1	0	1
Totals (3 entries)		5	5	5	15

== Medalists ==
Event	Gold	Silver	Bronze
Men's singles	Punch Gunalan; Malaysia	Jamie Paulson; Canada	Derek Talbot; England
Women's singles	Gillian Gilks; England	Margaret Beck; England	Sylvia Ng; Malaysia
Men's doubles	Elliot Stuart; Derek Talbot; England	Ray Stevens; Mike Tredgett; England	Punch Gunalan; Dominic Soong; Malaysia
Women's doubles	Margaret Beck; Gillian Gilks; England	Margaret Boxall; Susan Whetnall; England	Rosalind Singha Ang; Sylvia Ng; Malaysia
Mixed doubles	Derek Talbot; Gillian Gilks; England	Paul Whetnall; Nora Gardner; England	Elliot Stuart; Susan Whetnall; England

== Final results ==
Category	Winners	Runners-up	Score
Men's singles	(Malaysia) Punch Gunalan	(Canada) Jamie Paulson	15–1, 15–6
Women's singles	(England) Gillian Gilks	(England) Margaret Beck	11–8, 11–8
Men's doubles	(England) Elliot Stuart & Derek Talbot	(England) Ray Stevens & Mike Tredgett	15-6, 6-15, 15–11
Women's doubles	(England) Margaret Beck & Gillian Gilks	(England) Margaret Boxall & Susan Whetnall	15–7, 15–5
Mixed doubles	(England) Derek Talbot & Gillian Gilks	(England) Paul Whetnall & Nora Gardner	w/o (Whetnall injured)

== Results ==
=== Men's singles ===
Round of 16
1	(Malaysia) Punch Gunalan	15	15
16	(Scotland) Nicol McCloy	6	2
8	(New Zealand) Ross Livingston	15	15
9	(England) Elliot Stuart	9	3
5	(England) Derek Talbot	15	15
12	(New Zealand) Warren Johns	1	12
4	(India) Prakash Padukone	15	15
13	(Malaysia) Dominic Soong	8	8
6	(Canada) Jamie Paulson	15	15
11	(Australia) Paul Tyrrell	8	3
3	(New Zealand) Richard Purser	15	15
14	(Malaysia) Moo Foot Lian	6	10
7	(England) Paul Whetnall	15	15
10	(Wales) Howard Jennings	1	0
2	(Malaysia) Tan Aik Mong	15	15
15	(New Zealand) Bryan Purser	4	3

Quarter-finals
(Malaysia) Gunalan	15	15
(New Zealand) Livingston	7	8
(England) Talbot	15	15
(India) Padukone	9	6
(Canada) Paulson	6	15	15
(New Zealand) Purser	15	10	9
(England) Whetnall	18	8	18
(Malaysia) Mong	13	15	16

Semi-finals
(Malaysia) Gunalan	15	2	15
(England) Talbot	13	15	11
(Canada) Paulson	15	15
(England) Whetnall	4	0

Final
(Malaysia) Gunalan	15	15
(Canada) Paulson	1	6
Third place
(England) Talbot	w/o
(England) Whetnall	scr

=== Women's singles ===
Round of 16
1	(England) Gillian Gilks	11	11
16	(Tanzania) Yasmin Kanji	0	0
8	(Australia) Joan Jones	11	11
9	(New Zealand) Gaynor Weatherley	3	3
5	(Malaysia) Sylvia Ng	11	9	11
12	(England) Nora Gardner	5	11	4
4	(Australia) Kay Terry	11	11
13	(New Zealand) Alison Branfield	3	6
6	(England) Margaret Beck	11	11
11	(Scotland) Christine Stewart	1	1
3	(Canada) Jane Youngberg	11	11
14	(Australia) Judith Nyirati	7	8
7	(England) Susan Whetnall	12	11
10	(Scotland) Joanna Flockhart	9	6
2	(Malaysia) Rosalind Singha Ang	11	11
15	(Canada) Nancy McKinley	6	9

Quarter-finals
(England) Gilks	11	11
(Australia) Jones	2	5
(Malaysia) Ng	11	11
(Australia) Terry	6	3
(England) Beck	11	11
(Canada) Youngberg	6	3
(England) Whetnall	11	11
(Malaysia) Ang	6	3

Semi-finals
(England) Gilks	6	11	11
(Malaysia) Ng	11	8	0
(England) Beck	11	11
(England) Whetnall	1	9

Final
(England) Gilks	11	11
(England) Beck	8	8
Third place
(Malaysia) Ng	11	11
(England) Whetnall	2	8

=== Men's doubles ===
Quarterfinals
(England) Elliot Stuart (England) Derek Talbot	15	15
(Canada) Geoff Harris (Canada) Greg Harris	1	12
(Scotland) Fraser Gow (Scotland) Bob McCoig	15	15
(Malaysia) Tan Aik Mong (Malaysia) Moo Foot Lian	5	4
(England) Ray Stevens (England) Mike Tredgett	15	15
(New Zealand) Ross Livingston (New Zealand) Warren Johns	3	9
(Malaysia) Dominic Soong (Malaysia) Punch Gunalan	15	15
(Scotland) Jim Ansari (Scotland) Nicol McCloy	4	6

Semifinals
(England) Stuart (England) Talbot	15	15
(Scotland) Gow (Scotland) McCoig	8	5
(England) Stevens (England) Tredgett	15	15
(Malaysia) Chok Soon (Malaysia) Gunalan	6	8

Finals
(England) Stuart (England) Talbot	15	6	15
(England) Stevens (England) Tredgett	6	15	11
Third place
(Malaysia) Chok Soon (Malaysia) Gunalan	17	15	15
(Scotland) Gow (Scotland) McCoig	18	5	7

=== Women's doubles ===
Quarterfinals
(England) Margaret Beck (England) Gillian Gilks	15	15
(Canada) Barbara Welch (Canada) Jane Youngberg	9	10
(Malaysia) Rosalind Singha Ang (Malaysia) Sylvia Ng	15	15
(New Zealand) Alison Branfield (New Zealand) Robin Denton	12	4
(England) Margaret Boxall (England) Susan Whetnall	15	15
(New Zealand) Frances Erceg (New Zealand) Glenys Waller	1	6
(Canada) Mimi Nilsson (Canada) Judy Rollick	9	15	15
(Australia) Judith Nyirati (Australia) Linda Cory	15	10	4

Semifinals
(England) Beck (England) Gilks	15	15
(Malaysia) Ang (Malaysia) Ng	1	7
(England) Boxall (England) Whetnall	15	15
(Canada) Nilsson (Canada) Rollick	5	1

Finals
(England) Beck (England) Gilks	15	15
(England) Boxall (England) Whetnall	7	5
Third place
(Malaysia) Ang (Malaysia) Ng	15	15
(Canada) Nilsson (Canada) Rollick	2	8

=== Mixed doubles ===
Quarterfinals
(England) Derek Talbot (England) Gillian Gilks	15	15
(Australia) Paul Tyrrell (Australia) Judith Nyirati	7	12
(New Zealand) Richard Purser (New Zealand) Alison Branfield	15	15
(Scotland) Fraser Gow (Scotland) Christine Stewart	13	7
(England) Paul Whetnall (England) Nora Gardner	18	15
(Scotland) Bob McCoig (Scotland) Joanna Flockhart	15	9
(England) Elliot Stuart (England) Susan Whetnall	15	15
(Australia) Chris Hardwick (Australia) Kay Terry	4	11

Semifinals
(England) Talbot (England) Gilks	15	15
(New Zealand) Purser (New Zealand) Branfield	1	12
(England) Whetnall (England) Gardner	10	15	15
(England) Stuart (England) Whetnall	15	3	12

Finals
(England) Talbot (England) Gilks	w/o
(England) Whetnall (England) Gardner	scr
Third place
(England) Stuart (England) Whetnall	15	15
(New Zealand) Purser (New Zealand) Branfield	10	4
