= Badminton at the 1973 SEAP Games =

SEA Games event

Badminton at the 1973 Southeast Asian Peninsular Games
- Venue: Singapore Badminton Hall, Singapore
- Dates: 2 – 5 September 1973
- Nations: 5

Badminton at the 1973 SEAP Games was held at Singapore Badminton Hall, Singapore City, Singapore. Badminton events was held between 2 and 5 September.

== Medal table ==
* Host nation (Singapore)

Rank	Nation	Gold	Silver	Bronze	Total
1	Malaysia	4	4	1	9
2	Thailand	3	3	4	10
3	Singapore*	0	0	2	2
Totals (3 entries)		7	7	7	21

== Medalists ==
Event	Gold	Silver	Bronze
Men's singles	Punch Gunalan; Malaysia	Tan Aik Mong; Malaysia	Bandid Jaiyen; Thailand
Women's singles	Sylvia Ng; Malaysia	Rosalind Singha Ang; Malaysia	Thongkam Kingmanee; Thailand
Men's doubles	Bandid Jaiyen; Sangob Rattanusorn; Thailand	Dominic Soong; Punch Gunalan; Malaysia	Chirasak Champakao; Pornchai Sakuntaniyom; Thailand
Women's doubles	Rosalind Singha Ang; Sylvia Ng; Malaysia	Thongkam Kingmanee; Sirisriro Patama; Thailand	Sumol Chanklum; Pachara Pattabongse; Thailand
Mixed doubles	Chirasak Champakao; Pachara Pattabongse; Thailand	Pornchai Sakuntaniyom; Thongkam Kingmanee; Thailand	Punch Gunalan; Sylvia Ng; Malaysia
Men's team	Thailand; Chirasak Champakao; Bandid Jaiyen; Sangob Rattanusorn; Pornchai Sakuntaniyom; Chaisak Thongdejsri	Malaysia; Punch Gunalan; Moo Foot Lian; Dominic Soong; Tan Aik Mong	Singapore; Ahmad Abu Bakar Baghrib; Chan Kong Ming; Lee Ah Ngo; Ng Chor Yau; Tan Ban Chew; Tan Khee Wee
Women's team	Malaysia; Rosalind Singha Ang; Sylvia Ng; Sylvia Tan; Katherine Teh	Thailand; Sumol Chanklum; Thongkam Kingmanee; Sirisriro Patama; Pachara Pattabongse	Singapore; Cindy Cheong; Juliana Lee; Lee Ah Ngo; Leong Kay Peng; Leong Kay Sine; Lim Choo Eng; Peh Ah Bee
