= Tan Aik Mong =

Malaysian Chinese badminton player (1950–2020)

Tan Aik Mong 陈奕茂
Personal information
- Born: 6 April 1950 Penang, Federation of Malaya
- Died: 31 May 2020 (aged 70) Petaling Jaya, Malaysia
- Years active: 1966-1975

Sport
- Country: Malaysia
- Sport: Badminton
- Handedness: Right
- Event: Men's singles and men's doubles
Medal record
Men's badminton
Representing Malaysia
Thomas Cup
Silver medal – second place	1970 Kuala Lumpur	Team
Asian Championships
Gold medal – first place	1971 Jakarta	Men's singles
Silver medal – second place	1971 Jakarta	Men's team
Silver medal – second place	1969 Manila	Men's team
Southeast Asian Games
Silver medal – second place	1973 Singapore	Men's singles
Silver medal – second place	1973 Singapore	Men's team

Tan Aik Mong (6 April 1950 – 31 May 2020) was a Malaysian Chinese badminton player. He was the younger brother of Tan Aik Huang.

== Achievements ==
=== Asian Championships ===
Men's singles
Year	Venue	Opponent	Score	Result
1971	Jakarta, Indonesia	(Japan) Junji Honma	15–5, 15–10	Gold

=== Southeast Asian Peninsular Games ===
Men's singles
Year	Venue	Opponent	Score	Result
1973	Singapore Badminton Hall, Singapore City, Singapore	(Malaysia) Punch Gunalan	8–15, 11–15	Silver

=== International tournaments ===
Men's singles
Year	Tournament	Opponent	Score	Result
1969	Singapore Pesta	(Indonesia) Muljadi	13–18, 4–15	(silver) Runner-up
1972	Singapore Open	(Indonesia) Iie Sumirat	5–15, 11–15	(silver) Runner-up

Men's doubles
Year	Tournament	Partner	Opponent	Score	Result
1969	Denmark Open	(Malaysia) Tan Aik Huang	(Japan) Ippei Kojima (Denmark) Bjarne Andersen	9–15, 15–6, 7–15	(silver) Runner-up
1972	Singapore Open	(Malaysia) Tan Aik Huang	(Malaysia) Punch Gunalan (Malaysia) Ng Boon Bee	15–11, retired	(gold) Winner
1972	Jakarta Open	(Malaysia) Tan Aik Huang	(Indonesia) Ade Chandra (Indonesia) Christian Hadinata	10–15, 15–9, 6–15	(silver) Runner-up
