= Punch Gunalan =

Malaysian badminton player (1944–2012)

Personal information
- Born: 4 February 1944 Sepang, Selangor, Japanese Malaya
- Died: 15 August 2012 (aged 68) Petaling Jaya, Selangor, Malaysia

Sport
- Country: Malaysia
- Sport: Badminton
- Handedness: Right
- Event: Men's Singles & Men's Doubles
Medal record
Men's badminton
Representing Malaysia
Thomas Cup
Silver medal – second place	1970 Kuala Lumpur	Men's team
Commonwealth Games
Gold medal – first place	1970 Edinburgh	Men's doubles
Gold medal – first place	1974 Christchurch	Men's singles
Bronze medal – third place	1974 Christchurch	Men's doubles
Asian Games
Gold medal – first place	1970 Bangkok	Men's doubles
Gold medal – first place	1970 Bangkok	Men's singles
Bronze medal – third place	1970 Bangkok	Men's team
Asian Championships
Gold medal – first place	1969 Manila	Men's doubles
Silver medal – second place	1969 Manila	Men's singles
Silver medal – second place	1969 Manila	Men's team
Southeast Asian Games
Gold medal – first place	1969 Yangon	Men's singles
Gold medal – first place	1969 Yangon	Men's doubles
Gold medal – first place	1971 Kuala Lumpur	Men's doubles
Gold medal – first place	1971 Kuala Lumpur	Men's team
Gold medal – first place	1973 Singapore	Men's singles
Silver medal – second place	1971 Kuala Lumpur	Men's singles
Silver medal – second place	1973 Singapore	Men's doubles
Silver medal – second place	1973 Singapore	Men's team
Bronze medal – third place	1973 Singapore	Mixed doubles

Datuk Punch Gunalan PSD BSD (4 February 1944 – 15 August 2012) was a Malaysian badminton player who achieved success in both singles and doubles competitions.

== Badminton career ==
Gunalan was a right-hander who spent the early years of his playing career competing only sporadically as a student in England.

In the early 70s, Gunalan and his partner, Ng Boon Bee, became the leading men's doubles team in the world. They captured gold at the biennial Asian Games (1970), at the quadrennial Commonwealth Games (1970), and at the Asian Championships (1969). They captured the venerable All England title in 1971.

Though perhaps less consistent in singles than he was in doubles, Gunalan was capable of playing it at the highest level. He reached the All-England singles final in 1974, losing in three close sets to the iconic Rudy Hartono. He also helped Malaysia reach the Thomas Cup final in 1970. He is the only Malaysian to capture gold medals in both men's singles and men's doubles at the Sea Games, the Commonwealth Games, and the Asian Games.

== Post-retirement ==
After retiring as a player in 1974, Gunalan served in various stints as coach of the Malaysian team, an official in the Malaysian Badminton Association, and an official in the International Badminton Federation (now Badminton World Federation). In 1992, as team manager of the Thomas Cup together with the Badminton Association of Malaysia (BAM) president Tan Sri Elyas Omar, Malaysia won the Thomas Cup, beating Indonesia.

== Death ==
Gunalan died on 15 August 2012 in Subang Medical Centre, Subang Jaya, after a short battle against cancer. He was 68.

== Honours ==
- Malaysia:
  - Herald of the Order of Loyalty to the Royal Family of Malaysia (BSD) (1988)
  - Commander of the Order of Loyalty to the Royal Family of Malaysia (PSD) – Datuk (1992)

== Achievements ==
=== Olympic Games (demonstration) ===
Men's doubles
Year	Venue	Partner	Opponent	Score	Result
1972	Volleyballhalle, Munich, West Germany	(Malaysia) Ng Boon Bee	(Indonesia) Ade Chandra (Indonesia) Christian Hadinata	4–15, 15–2, 11–15	Silver

=== Commonwealth Games ===
Men's singles
Year	Venue	Opponent	Score	Result
1974	Cowles Stadium, Christchurch, New Zealand	(Canada) Jamie Paulson	15–1, 15–6	Gold

Men's doubles
Year	Venue	Partner	Opponent	Score	Result
1970	Meadowbank Stadium, Edinburgh, Scotland	(Malaysia) Ng Boon Bee	(Malaysia) Ng Tat Wai (Malaysia) Tan Soon Hoi	15–3, 15–3	Gold
1974	Cowles Stadium, Christchurch, New Zealand	(Malaysia) Dominic Soong	(Scotland) Bob McCoig (Scotland) Fraser Gow	17–18, 15–5, 15–7	Bronze

=== Asian Games ===
Men's singles
Year	Venue	Opponent	Score	Result
1970	Kittikachorn Stadium, Bangkok, Thailand	(Indonesia) Muljadi	4–15, 15–3, 15–12	Gold

Men's doubles
Year	Venue	Partner	Opponent	Score	Result
1970	Kittikachorn Stadium, Bangkok, Thailand	(Malaysia) Ng Boon Bee	(Japan) Junji Honma (Japan) Shoichi Toganoo	5–15, 15–8, 15–7	Gold

=== Asian Championships ===
Men's singles
Year	Venue	Opponent	Score	Result
1969	Rizal Stadium, Manila, Philippines	(Indonesia) Muljadi	11–15, 3–15	Silver

Men's doubles
Year	Venue	Partner	Opponent	Score	Result
1969	Rizal Stadium, Manila, Philippines	(Malaysia) Ng Boon Bee	(Japan) Yukinori Hori (Japan) Ippei Kojima	15–8, 5–15, 15–11	Gold

=== Southeast Asian Peninsular Games ===
Men's singles
Year	Venue	Opponent	Score	Result
1969	Aung San National Indoor Stadium, Rangoon, Burma	(Thailand) Soon Akayapisud	15–2, 15–4	Gold
1971	Stadium Negara, Kuala Lumpur, Malaysia	(Malaysia) Tan Aik Huang	12–15, 11–15	Silver
1973	Singapore Badminton Stadium, Singapore	(Malaysia) Tan Aik Mong	15–8, 15–11	Gold

Men's doubles
Year	Venue	Partner	Opponent	Score	Result
1969	Aung San National Indoor Stadium, Rangoon, Burma	(Malaysia) Yew Cheng Hoe	(Thailand) Thongchai Phongful (Thailand) Singha Siribanterng	15–8, 15–9	Gold
1971	Stadium Negara, Kuala Lumpur, Malaysia	(Malaysia) Ng Boon Bee	(Malaysia) Ng Tat Wai (Malaysia) Ho Khim Kooi	15–10, 15–10	Gold
1973	Singapore Badminton Stadium, Singapore	(Malaysia) Dominic Soong	(Thailand) Sangob Rattanusorn (Thailand) Bandid Jaiyen	10–15, 15–18	Silver

Mixed doubles
Year	Venue	Partner	Opponent	Score	Result
1973	Singapore Badminton Stadium, Singapore	(Malaysia) Sylvia Ng	(Singapore) Yeo Ah Seng (Singapore) Tan Chor Kiang	15–5, 15–6	Bronze

=== International tournaments ===
Men's singles
Year	Tournament	Opponent	Score	Result
1974	All England	(Indonesia) Rudy Hartono	15–8, 9–15, 10–15	(silver) Runner-up

Men's doubles
Year	Tournament	Partner	Opponent	Score	Result
1966	Dutch Open	(Malaysia) Oon Chong Hau	(Denmark) Elo Hansen (Denmark) Knud Aage Nielsen	15–4, 15–4	(gold) Winner
1968	Northern Indian	(Malaysia) Tan Yee Khan	(Indonesia) Rudy Hartono (Indonesia) Indratno	15–3, 6–15, 7–15	(silver) Runner-up
1969	Singapore Pesta	(Malaysia) Ng Boon Bee	(Indonesia) Indratno (Indonesia) Mintarja	15–5, 15–5	(gold) Winner
1969	U.S. Open	(Malaysia) Ng Boon Bee	(Japan) Ippei Kojima (Thailand) Channarong Ratanaseangsuang	15–3, 15–7	(gold) Winner
1971	Poona Open	(Malaysia) Ng Boon Bee	(Malaysia) Lee Kok Pheng (Malaysia) Lim Shook Kong	15–4, 15–5	(gold) Winner
1971	German Open	(Malaysia) Ng Boon Bee	(Germany) Willi Braun (Germany) Roland Maywald	15–12, 15–8	(gold) Winner
1971	Denmark Open	(Malaysia) Ng Boon Bee	(Indonesia) Indra Gunawan (Indonesia) Rudy Hartono	11–15, 15–4, 15–8	(gold) Winner
1971	All England	(Malaysia) Ng Boon Bee	(Indonesia) Indra Gunawan (Indonesia) Rudy Hartono	15–5, 15–3	(gold) Winner
1971	Canadian Open	(Malaysia) Ng Boon Bee	(Thailand) Raphi Kanchanaraphi (Thailand) Channarong Ratanaseangsuang	15–0, 15–11	(gold) Winner
1971	U.S. Open	(Malaysia) Ng Boon Bee	(United States) Don Paup (United States) Jim Poole	2–15, 18–13, 15–7	(gold) Winner
1972	Denmark Open	(Malaysia) Ng Boon Bee	(Thailand) Bandid Jaiyen (Thailand) Sangob Rattanusorn	15–6, 15–6	(gold) Winner
1972	Poona Open	(Malaysia) Ng Boon Bee	(Malaysia) Abdul Rahman Mohamad (Malaysia) Ng Tat Wai	10–15, 15–8, 15–8	(gold) Winner
1972	German Open	(Malaysia) Ng Boon Bee	(England) Elliot Stuart (England) Derek Talbot	15–9, 15–12	(gold) Winner
1972	Singapore Open	(Malaysia) Ng Boon Bee	(Malaysia) Tan Aik Huang (Malaysia) Tan Aik Mong	11–15, retired	(silver) Runner-up
1974	Scottish Open	(Denmark) Tom Bacher	(England) Ray Stevens (England) Mike Tredgett	15–9, 15–8	(gold) Winner
