= Dominic Soong =

Malaysian-Canadian badminton player

Dominic Soong 宋作順
Personal information
- Born: 1950 (age 75–76)

Sport
- Country: Malaysia; Canada
- Sport: Badminton
Medal record
Representing Malaysia
Men's badminton
Thomas Cup
Silver medal – second place	1976 Bangkok	Team
Commonwealth Games
Bronze medal – third place	1974 Christchurch	Men's doubles
Southeast Asian Games
Gold medal – first place	1975 Bangkok	Mixed doubles
Silver medal – second place	1973 Singapore	Men's doubles
Silver medal – second place	1973 Singapore	Men's team
Silver medal – second place	1975 Bangkok	Men's doubles
Silver medal – second place	1975 Bangkok	Men's team
Bronze medal – third place	1977 Kuala Lumpur	Men's team

Dominic Soong Chok Soon (born c. 1950) is a former male badminton player. He was a doubles player who played first for Malaysia and later for Canada.

== Career ==
Dominic Soong came second at the 1973 Southeast Asian Games in the men's doubles with Punch Gunalan. A year later, they jointly won bronze at the Commonwealth Games. In 1976 Soong played on the Malaysian Thomas Cup team which upset Denmark and finished second to Indonesia. In his new home in Canada, he won the men's doubles competition at the individual championships in 1978.

== Coach ==
Dominic Soong is the founder of the Soong Badminton Academy based in Ottawa, Canada. Having coached for over 40 years, Dominic coaches players of all ages and regularly takes them to compete at regional, provincial, and national level tournaments.

== Achievements ==
=== Southeast Asian Peninsular Games ===
Men's doubles
Year	Venue	Partner	Opponent	Score	Result
1973	Singapore Badminton Stadium, Singapore City, Singapore	(Malaysia) Punch Gunalan	(Thailand) Sangob Rattanusorn (Thailand) Bandid Jaiyen	10–15, 15–18	Silver
1975	Bangkok, Thailand	(Malaysia) Cheah Hong Chong	(Thailand) Pornchai Sakuntaniyom (Thailand) Preecha Sopajaree	10–15, 4–15	Silver

Mixed doubles
Year	Venue	Partner	Opponent	Score	Result
1975	Bangkok, Thailand	(Malaysia) Rosalind Singha Ang	(Malaysia) Cheah Hong Chong (Malaysia) Sylvia Ng	15–5, 15–4	Gold

=== Commonwealth Games ===
Men's doubles
Year	Venue	Partner	Opponent	Score	Result
1974	Cowles Stadium, Christchurch, New Zealand	(Malaysia) Punch Gunalan	(Scotland) Bob McCoig (Scotland) Fraser Gow	17–18, 15–5, 15–7	Bronze
