= Rosalind Singha Ang =

Malaysian badminton player

Rosalind Singha Ang 洪新霞
Personal information
- Born: 1941 (age 84–85) Yala Province, Thailand
- Years active: 1964 – 1975

Sport
- Country: Malaysia
- Sport: Badminton
- Handedness: Right
- Event: Women's and mixed doubles
Medal record
Women's badminton
Representing Malaysia
Commonwealth Games
Bronze medal – third place	1966 Kingston	Women's doubles
Bronze medal – third place	1970 Edinburgh	Women's doubles
Bronze medal – third place	1974 Christchurch	Women's doubles
Asian Games
Gold medal – first place	1966 Bangkok	Mixed doubles
Bronze medal – third place	1970 Bangkok	Women's doubles
Asian Championships
Silver medal – second place	1965 Lucknow	Women's doubles
SEA Games
Gold medal – first place	1965 Kuala Lumpur	Women's singles
Gold medal – first place	1967 Bangkok	Women's doubles
Gold medal – first place	1969 Rangoon	Women's doubles
Gold medal – first place	1969 Rangoon	Mixed doubles
Gold medal – first place	1971 Kuala Lumpur	Women's singles
Gold medal – first place	1973 Singapore	Women's doubles
Gold medal – first place	1973 Singapore	Women's team
Gold medal – first place	1975 Bangkok	Women's team
Gold medal – first place	1975 Bangkok	Women's doubles
Gold medal – first place	1975 Bangkok	Mixed doubles
Silver medal – second place	1965 Kuala Lumpur	Women's doubles
Silver medal – second place	1965 Kuala Lumpur	Women's team
Silver medal – second place	1965 Kuala Lumpur	Mixed doubles
Silver medal – second place	1967 Bangkok	Women's singles
Silver medal – second place	1971 Kuala Lumpur	Women's doubles
Silver medal – second place	1971 Kuala Lumpur	Mixed doubles
Silver medal – second place	1971 Kuala Lumpur	Women's team
Silver medal – second place	1973 Singapore	Women's singles
Silver medal – second place	1977 Kuala Lumpur	Women's doubles
Silver medal – second place	1977 Kuala Lumpur	Women's team

Dato' Rosalind Singha Ang AMN (Chinese: 洪新霞; pinyin: Hóng Xīnxiá; born 1941) is a Malaysian badminton player. Her parents were Malaysians of Chinese descent.

== Career ==
The woman who has been labeled as the shuttle queen Rosalind Singha Ang crafted her name through badminton. Ang made the headlines in her international debut, by winning the SEAP Games singles gold medal in 1965 and ended her international career in glory by lifting the 1975 SEAP Games singles, mixed doubles and team gold medals. The most memorable triumph Rosalind made was the capturing of the 1966 Asian Games in Bangkok with Teh Kew San in the mixed doubles.

== Honours ==
- Malaysia
  - Member of the Order of the Defender of the Realm (A.M.N., 1978)
- Kedah
  - Knight Companion Exalted Order of Kedah (D.S.D.K., 2013) – Dato'

== Achievements ==
=== Commonwealth Games ===
Women's doubles
Year	Venue	Partner	Opponent	Score	Result
1966	Convention Hall, Kingston, Jamaica	(Malaysia) Teoh Siew Yong	(New Zealand) Alison Glenie (New Zealand) Gaynor Simpson	15–11, 15–9	Bronze
1970	Meadowbank Stadium, Edinburgh, Scotland	(Malaysia) Teoh Siew Yong	(Malaysia) Sylvia Ng (Malaysia) Sylvia Tan	15–2, 12–15, 15–10	Bronze
1974	Cowles Stadium, Christchurch, New Zealand	(Malaysia) Sylvia Ng	(Canada) Mimi Nilsson (Canada) Judy Rollick	15–2, 15–8	Bronze

=== Asian Games ===
Women's doubles
Year	Venue	Partner	Opponent	Score	Result
1970	Kittikachorn Stadium, Bangkok, Thailand	(Malaysia) Teoh Siew Yong	(Indonesia) Retno Kustijah (Indonesia) Nurhaena	5–15, 10–15	Bronze

Mixed doubles
Year	Venue	Partner	Opponent	Score	Result
1966	Kittikachorn Stadium, Bangkok, Thailand	(Malaysia) Teh Kew San	(Malaysia) Eddy Choong (Malaysia) Tan Gaik Bee	18–13, 11–15, 15–5	Gold

=== Asian Championships ===
Women's doubles
Year	Venue	Partner	Opponent	Score	Result
1965	Lucknow, India	(Malaysia) Teoh Siew Yong	(England) Angela Bairstow (England) Ursula Smith	13–18, 11–15	Silver

=== SEA Games ===
Women's singles
Year	Venue	Opponent	Score	Result
1965	Selangor Badminton Hall, Kuala Lumpur, Malaysia	(Thailand) Sumol Chanklum	11–4, 11–1	Gold
1967	Kittikachorn Stadium, Bangkok, Thailand	(Thailand) Thongkam Kingmanee	8–11, 11–2, 3–11	Silver
1971	Stadium Negara, Kuala Lumpur, Malaysia	(Thailand) Thongkam Kingmanee	11–5, 11–6	Gold
1973	Singapore Badminton Hall, Singapore	(Malaysia) Sylvia Ng	1–11, 3–11	Silver

Women's doubles
Year	Venue	Partner	Opponent	Score	Result
1965	Selangor Badminton Hall, Kuala Lumpur, Malaysia	(Malaysia) Teoh Siew Yong	(Thailand) Pachara Pattabongse (Thailand) Pratuang Pattabongse	10–15, 8–15	Silver
1967	Kittikachorn Stadium, Bangkok, Thailand	(Malaysia) Teoh Siew Yong	(Malaysia) Ho Cheng Yoke (Malaysia) Sylvia Tan	18–17, 15–8	Gold
1969	Aung San National Indoor Stadium, Rangoon, Myanmar	(Malaysia) Teoh Siew Yong	(Malaysia) Khaw Gaik Bee (Malaysia) Sylvia Ng	15–8, 15–12	Gold
1971	Stadium Negara, Kuala Lumpur, Malaysia	(Malaysia) Teoh Siew Yong	(Thailand) Thongkam Kingmanee (Thailand) Pachara Pattabongse	8–15, 8–15	Silver
1973	Singapore Badminton Hall, Singapore	(Malaysia) Sylvia Ng	(Thailand) Thongkam Kingmanee (Thailand) Sirisriro Patama	15–2, 15–5	Gold
1975	Indoor Stadium Huamark, Bangkok, Thailand	(Malaysia) Sylvia Ng	(Thailand) Thongkam Kingmanee (Thailand) Sirisriro Patama	15–5, 15–3	Gold
1977	Stadium Negara, Kuala Lumpur, Malaysia	(Malaysia) Sylvia Ng	(Indonesia) Regina Masli (Indonesia) Theresia Widiastuti	2–15, 4–15	Silver

Mixed doubles
Year	Venue	Partner	Opponent	Score	Result
1965	Selangor Badminton Hall, Kuala Lumpur, Malaysia	(Malaysia) Tan Yee Khan	(Malaysia) Ng Boon Bee (Malaysia) Teh Siew Yong	11–15, 5–15	Silver
1969	Aung San National Indoor Stadium, Rangoon, Myanmar	(Malaysia) Ng Boon Bee	(Malaysia) Yew Cheng Hoe (Malaysia) Khaw Gaik Bee	17–18, 18–17, retired	Gold
1971	Stadium Negara, Kuala Lumpur, Malaysia	(Malaysia) Ng Boon Bee	(Malaysia) Ng Tat Wai (Malaysia) Ng Mei Ling	Walkover	Silver
1975	Indoor Stadium Huamark, Bangkok, Thailand	(Malaysia) Dominic Soong	(Malaysia) Cheah Hong Chong (Malaysia) Sylvia Ng	15–5, 15–4	Gold

=== International tournaments ===
Women's singles
Year	Tournament	Opponent	Score	Result
1965	Malaysia Open	(Malaysia) Teoh Siew Yong	11–5, 10–12, 11–8	(gold) Winner

Women's doubles
Year	Tournament	Partner	Opponent	Score	Result
1963	Malaysia Open	(Malaysia) Teoh Siew Yong	(Malaysia) Tan Gaik Bee (Malaysia) Ng Mei Ling	5–15, 5–15	(silver) Runner-up
1964	Malaysia Open	(Malaysia) Teoh Siew Yong	(Malaysia) Sylvia Tan (Malaysia) Ho Cheng Yoke	15–13, 15–12	(gold) Winner
1965	Malaysia Open	(Malaysia) Teoh Siew Yong	(Malaysia) Chong Yoon Choo (Malaysia) Phuah Kooi Fan	15–1, 15–5	(gold) Winner
1967	Malaysia Open	(Malaysia) Teoh Siew Yong	(Indonesia) Minarni (Indonesia) Retno Koestijah	7–15, 1–15	(silver) Runner-up
1968	Singapore Open	(Sweden) Eva Twedberg	(Japan) Hiroe Yuki (Japan) Noriko Takagi	6–15, 11–15	(silver) Runner-up
1970	Singapore Open	(Malaysia) Teoh Siew Yong	(Indonesia) Minarni (Indonesia) Retno Koestijah	11–15, 4–15	(silver) Runner-up
1971	Singapore Open	(Malaysia) Teoh Siew Yong	(Singapore) Rebecca Loh (Singapore) Nancy Sng	15–2, 15–0	(gold) Winner

Mixed doubles
Year	Tournament	Partner	Opponent	Score	Result
1965	Malaysia Open	(Malaysia) Eddy Choong	(Malaysia) Teh Kew San (Malaysia) Ng Mei Ling	10–15, 7–15	(silver) Runner-up
1966	Penang Open	(Malaysia) Eddy Choong	(Indonesia) A. P. Unang (Indonesia) Minarni	13–15, 9–15	(silver) Runner-up
1966	Malaysia Open	(Malaysia) Eddy Choong	(Indonesia) A. P. Unang (Indonesia) Retno Koestijah	8–9, retired	(silver) Runner-up
1967	Singapore Open	(Malaysia) Ng Boon Bee	(Indonesia) Darmadi (Indonesia) Minarni	4–15, 5–15	(silver) Runner-up

=== Invitational tournament ===
Women's doubles
Year	Tournament	Partner	Opponent	Score	Result
1976	Asian Invitational Championships	(Malaysia) Sylvia Ng	(Thailand) Sirisriro Patama (Thailand) Kingmanee Thongkam	15–9, 18–14	Gold
1977	Asian Invitational Championships	(Malaysia) Sylvia Ng	(Thailand) Sirisriro Patama (Thailand) Kingmanee Thongkam	15–7, 15–3	Bronze
