= Cowles Stadium =

Sports venue in Christchurch, New Zealand

- Interactive map of Cowles Stadium
- Address: 170 Pages Road; Aranui, Christchurch; Canterbury, New Zealand; Christchurch; New Zealand
- Location: Aranui, Christchurch, Canterbury, New Zealand
- Coordinates: 43.521847°S 172.696029°E

Construction
- Opened: 25 September 1961
- Cost: £31,400
- General contractors: F. W. Matthews, Ltd.

Tenants
- Canterbury Rams (NZNBL) 1982–1999, 2007–2008, 2014–2025; Mainland Pouākai (Tauihi) 2022–2025; Christchurch Sirens (WNBL) 2007–2008; Christchurch Cougars (NZBL) 2009–2010

Cowles Stadium is a multi-purpose indoor arena in Aranui, Christchurch. It is the former home arena of the Canterbury Rams of the New Zealand National Basketball League (NZNBL), the Mainland Pouākai of the Tauihi Basketball Aotearoa women's basketball league, the Christchurch Cougars of the NZNBL and the Christchurch Sirens of the Women's National Basketball League (WNBL).

== History ==
Cowles Stadium was constructed by F. W. Matthews, Ltd. Construction began in April 1960 and the stadium opened on 25 September 1961. Cowles Stadium was named in commemoration of William James Cowles, a Christchurch city councilor and sports administrator whose advocacy for an indoor sports stadium led to its construction. Cowles sponsored and supervised the stadium's construction.

=== Events ===
Cowles Stadium served as a venue for badminton at the 1974 British Commonwealth Games and volleyball and basketball at the 1989 World Games for the Deaf.

The Benson & Hedges Classic men's Grand Prix tennis tournament was held at Cowles Stadium during the 1973 and 1974 circuits. The tournament venue was shifted from Wilding Park to Cowles Stadium during the 1973 tournament due to rain, and remained indoors at Cowles Stadium in 1974 to avoid further potential disruptions from bad weather.

Cowles Stadium is the venue for the Dead End Derby roller derby league.

=== Home teams ===
Cowles Stadium was the home arena for the Canterbury Rams basketball team from the first NBL season in 1982 until 1999, when they relocated to Westpac Arena. The Rams returned to Cowles Stadium in 2007. In 2008, the Rams withdrew from the NBL and were replaced by the Christchurch Cougars, who used Cowles Stadium as their home arena for the 2009 and 2010 NBL seasons. The Cougars were barred from playing at Cowles Stadium in 2011 due to an unpaid debt to the Christchurch City Council and withdrew from the league following the 2011 Christchurch earthquake. The Rams returned to the NBL for the 2014 NBL season and used Cowles Stadium up until the 2026 NBL season when they permanently relocated to Parakiore Recreation and Sport Centre.

Cowles Stadium was the home arena of the Christchurch Sirens from November 2007 for the 2007–08 WNBL season — their only season in the WNBL. The Sirens relocated from Westpac Arena along with the Rams following upgrades to Cowles Stadium.

Cowles Stadium was the home arena of Mainland Pouākai of the Tauihi Basketball Aotearoa women's basketball league from the league's debut in 2022 until 2026 when they relocated to Parakiore Recreation and Sport Centre.

The Mainland Tactix netball team used Cowles Arena as one of their home arenas for the 2022 ANZ Premiership season.

=== Earthquakes ===
Cowles Stadium was used as a welfare centre after the 2010 Canterbury earthquake, February 2011 Christchurch earthquake, and June 2011 Christchurch earthquake. It was closed in 2011 due to roof damage cause by the earthquakes and re-opened in August 2012 following $480,000 renovations for repairs and earthquake strengthening.
