= Bandid Jaiyen =

Thai badminton player (born 1950)

Personal information
- Born: 5 March 1950 (age 76)

Sport
- Country: Thailand
- Sport: Badminton
Medal record
Men's badminton
Representing Thailand
World Championships
Silver medal – second place	1979 Hangzhou	Men's team
Bronze medal – third place	1979 Hangzhou	Mixed doubles
Asian Games
Silver medal – second place	1970 Bangkok	Mixed doubles
Silver medal – second place	1970 Bangkok	Men's team
Bronze medal – third place	1978 Bangkok	Men's team
Asian Championships
Bronze medal – third place	1971 Jakarta	Men's singles
Southeast Asian Games
Gold medal – first place	1975 Bangkok	Men's singles
Gold medal – first place	1973 Singapore	Men's doubles
Gold medal – first place	1979 Jakarta	Men's doubles
Gold medal – first place	1973 Singapore	Men's team
Gold medal – first place	1975 Bangkok	Men's team
Silver medal – second place	1971 Kuala Lumpur	Men's team
Silver medal – second place	1977 Kuala Lumpur	Men's team
Bronze medal – third place	1971 Kuala Lumpur	Men's singles
Bronze medal – third place	1973 Singapore	Men's singles
Bronze medal – third place	1971 Kuala Lumpur	Men's doubles
Bronze medal – third place	1977 Kuala Lumpur	Men's doubles
Bronze medal – third place	1979 Jakarta	Men's team
Bronze medal – third place	1981 Manila	Men's team

Bandid Jaiyen (born 5 March 1950) is a former badminton player who won numerous Thai national titles and also excelled internationally between the late 1960s and the early 1980s.

== Career ==
Thailand's leading singles player for a decade, the diminutive Jaiyen performed exceptionally well in Thomas Cup (men's international team) competition. He played a leading role in Thailand's upset win over Malaysia in Asian zone final of the 1973 Thomas Cup series. Noted for his exquisite strokes and tactical astuteness, he was the only player to win a match against an Indonesian opponent in the 1976 Thomas Cup series, and was one of only two to do so in the 1973 series. Among other international tournaments, Jaiyen won the South East Asian Peninsular singles title in 1975, the Canadian Open singles title in 1976, and the Auckland International singles title in 1977.

== Achievements ==
=== Asian Games ===
Mixed doubles
Year	Venue	Partner	Opponent	Score	Result
1970	Kittikachorn Stadium; Bangkok, Thailand	(Thailand) Pachara Pattabongse	(Malaysia) Ng Boon Bee (Malaysia) Sylvia Ng	13–18, 15–11, 10–15	Silver

=== Asian Championships ===
Men's singles
Year	Venue	Opponent	Score	Result
1971	Jakarta, Indonesia	(Myanmar) San Myint	17–14, 15–7	Bronze

=== Southeast Asian Peninsular Games ===
Men's singles
Year	Venue	Opponent	Score	Result
1971	Stadium Negara; Kuala Lumpur, Malaysia	(Malaysia)		Bronze
1973	Singapore Badminton Stadium, Singapore City, Singapore	(Malaysia)		Bronze
1975	Bangkok, Thailand	(Thailand) Pichai Kongsirithavorn	10–15, 15–5, 15–5	Gold

Men's doubles
Year	Venue	Partner	Opponent	Score	Result
1971	Stadium Negara; Kuala Lumpur, Malaysia	(Thailand) Thonchai Pongpoon			Bronze
1973	Singapore Badminton Stadium, Singapore City, Singapore	(Thailand) Sangob Rattanusorn	(Malaysia) Punch Gunalan (Malaysia) Dominic Soong	15–10, 18–15	Gold
1977	Stadium Negara, Kuala Lumpur, Malaysia	(Thailand) Surapong Suharitdamrong	(Malaysia) Koay Kar Lin (Malaysia) Dominic Soong		Bronze
1979	Jakarta, Indonesia	(Thailand) Preecha Sopajaree	(Indonesia) Ade Chandra (Indonesia) Christian Hadinata	15–9, 15–5	Gold

=== International tournaments ===
Men's singles
Year	Tournament	Opponent	Score	Result
1976	Canada Open	(Canada) Jamie McKee	15–2, 15–6	(gold) Winner

Men's doubles
Year	Tournament	Partner	Opponent	Score	Result
1972	Denmark Open	(Thailand) Sangob Rattanusorn	(Malaysia) Punch Gunalan (Malaysia) Ng Boon Bee	6–15, 6–15	(silver) Runner-up
1976	Canada Open	(Thailand) Surapong Suharitdamrong	(England) Mike Tredgett (England) Ray Stevens	15–12, 10–15, 6–15	(silver) Runner-up
1979	USSR International	(Thailand) Preecha Sopajaree	(Thailand) Sawei Chanseorasmee (Thailand) Sarit Pisudchaikul		(gold) Winner

Mixed doubles
Year	Tournament	Partner	Opponent	Score	Result
1971	Singapore Open	(Thailand) Thongkam Kingmanee	(Malaysia) Ng Boon Bee (Malaysia) Sylvia Ng	6–15, 9–15	(silver) Runner-up
