= 1975 SEAP Games =

Multi-sport event in Bangkok, Thailand

8th Southeast Asian Peninsular Games
- Host city: Bangkok, Thailand
- Nations: 4
- Sport: 18
- Opening: 9 December 1975
- Closing: 16 December 1975
- Opened by: Bhumibol Adulyadej; King of Thailand
- Ceremony venue: National Stadium

The 1975 Southeast Asian Peninsular Games, officially known as the 8th Southeast Asian Peninsular Games, were a Southeast Asian multi-sport event held in Bangkok, Thailand from 9 to 16 December 1975. This was the third time Thailand hosted the games, and its first time since 1967. Previously, Thailand also hosted the 1959 inaugural games. These were the last games to bear the Southeast Asian Peninsular Games name before it was renamed the Southeast Asian Games. The games were opened and closed by the King of Thailand, Bhumibol Adulyadej, at Suphalachasai Stadium.

Cambodia (previous as Khmer Republic) and Laos, which only sent token squads made up of military personnel to previous games, declined to participate due to internal political problems, while South Vietnam was fallen and no longer existed. The final medal tally was led by Thailand, followed by Singapore, Burma and Malaysia.

== The games ==
=== Participating nations ===
- Burma
- Malaysia
- Singapore
- Thailand (Host)

=== Sports ===
- Aquatics
- Athletics
- Badminton
- Basketball
- Bowling
- Boxing
- Cycling
- Football
- Hockey
- Judo
- Rugby union
- Sailing
- Sepak takraw
- Shooting
- Table tennis
- Tennis
- Volleyball
- Weightlifting

=== Medal table ===
Key

* Host nation (Thailand)

Rank	Nation	Gold	Silver	Bronze	Total
1	Thailand (THA)*	80	45	39	164
2	Singapore (SIN)	38	42	49	129
3	Burma (BIR)	28	35	33	96
4	Malaysia (MAS)	27	49	51	127
Totals (4 entries)		173	171	172	516

Preceded by Singapore	Southeast Asian Peninsular Games; Bangkok; VIII Southeast Asian Peninsular Games (1975)	Succeeded by Kuala Lumpur
