= 1973 SEAP Games =

Multi-sport event in Singapore

7th Southeast Asian Peninsular Games
- Host city: Singapore
- Nations: 7
- Sport: 16
- Opening: 1 September 1973
- Closing: 8 September 1973
- Opened by: Benjamin Sheares; President of Singapore
- Closed by: Benjamin Sheares; President of Singapore
- Torch lighter: C. Kunalan
- Ceremony venue: Singapore National Stadium

The 1973 Southeast Asian Peninsular Games, officially known as the 7th Southeast Asian Peninsular Games, were a Southeast Asian multi-sport event held in Singapore from 1 to 8 September 1973 with 16 sports featured in the games. This was the first time Singapore hosted the games. Singapore is the fourth nation to host the Southeast Asian Games after Thailand, Burma and Malaysia. The games was opened and closed by Benjamin Sheares, the President of Singapore at the Singapore National Stadium. The final medal tally was led by Thailand, followed by host Singapore and Malaysia.

== The games ==
=== Participating nations ===
- Burma
- Khmer Republic
- Laos
- Malaysia
- Singapore (host)
- South Vietnam
- Thailand

=== Sports ===
- Aquatics
- Athletics
- Badminton
- Basketball
- Boxing
- Cycling
- Football
- Hockey
- Judo
- Sailing
- Sepak takraw
- Shooting
- Table tennis
- Tennis
- Volleyball
- Weightlifting

== Medal table ==
* Host nation (Singapore)

Rank	Nation	Gold	Silver	Bronze	Total
1	Thailand (THA)	47	25	27	99
2	Singapore (SIN)*	45	50	45	140
3	Malaysia (MAS)	30	35	50	115
4	Burma (BIR)	28	24	15	67
5	Khmer Republic (KHM)	9	12	30	51
6	South Vietnam (VNM)	2	13	10	25
7	Laos (LAO)	0	5	4	9
Totals (7 entries)		161	164	181	506

Preceded by Kuala Lumpur	Southeast Asian Peninsular Games; Singapore; VII Southeast Asian Peninsular Games (1973)	Succeeded by Bangkok
