= Singapore Badminton Stadium =

Sports arena in Geylang, Singapore

Coordinates: 1°18′35.6″N 103°52′54.4″E

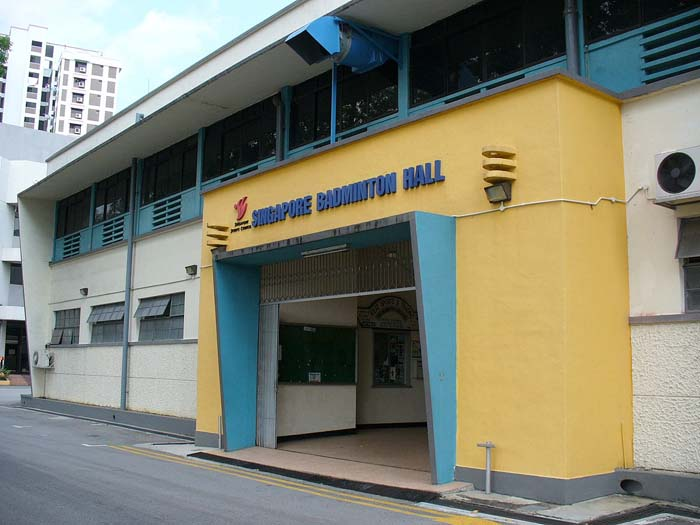
- The Former Singapore Badminton Hall at 100 Guillemard Road, Singapore.

- Location within Singapore
- Full name: Singapore Badminton Stadium @ KFF Badminton Arena
- Former names: Singapore Badminton Hall
- Address: 100 Guillemard Road, Singapore 399718
- Location: Singapore
- Owner: Singapore Badminton Association (former); Singapore Sports Council (former); Urban Redevelopment Authority
- Operator: Singapore Badminton Association (former); Singapore Sports Council (former)
- Type: Sports hall

Construction
- Groundbreaking: 1 June 1951; 75 years ago
- Built: July 1951; 75 years ago
- Opened: 7 June 1952; 74 years ago
- Renovated: 2008–2009
- Closed: January 2008; 18 years ago
- Reopened: May 2009; 17 years ago 9 August 2024; 2 years ago

The Singapore Badminton Stadium, formerly Singapore Badminton Hall (Abbreviation: SBH; Chinese: 新加坡羽毛球馆; pinyin: xīnjiāpō yǔmáoqiúguǎn), is an indoor sports hall for badminton located on Guillemard Road in Geylang, Singapore.

The old facility was previously situated at 100 Guillemard Road. The hall's nearby building (102 Guillemard Road) was formerly the headquarters of the Singapore Badminton Association (SBA). Both buildings were refurnished in May 2009 as the commercial centre Guillemard Village.

The current Singapore Badminton Hall is located at 1 Lorong 23 Geylang.

== History ==
=== Construction ===
In 1949, the Malayan team won their first championship in the Thomas Cup. As a result, Malaya also won the right to host the next Thomas Cup, that was scheduled for 1952. As there was no suitable indoor sports hall in Malaya then, the President of SBA, Lim Chuan Geok, decided to build one in Singapore. The construction cost was planned to be funded through public fundraising with the launching of the fundraising after a ceremony welcoming the victorious Thomas Cup team at the Victoria Memorial Hall.

The fundraising was found to be challenging when the government revealed its plan to construct another stadium at the same time, misleading many to think that the new badminton hall was thus replaced.

In February 1951, SBA requested from the Singapore Government a plot of land at Guillemard Road to build the badminton stadium. SBA was granted a 99-year lease on the land, effectively from 1 July the same year, and proceeded to construct the sports hall.

The estimated construction cost for the hall was S$200,000 to S$250,000 but the eventual cost rose to S$800,000. Donations then totalled only S$32,000. Aw Boon Haw, who was a patron of the SBA, gave a loan of S$250,000. Despite this, funds were still short by over S$400,000. Nevertheless, the Badminton Hall Management Committee, headed by Tan Ark Sye, pressed ahead with the construction of the hall. The deficit was ultimately absorbed by the building contractor of the hall, C. H. Tong.

The Singapore Badminton Stadium was completed in May 1952 and had changing rooms, canteens, offices, four badminton courts and 5500 seats.

On 7 June 1952, Singapore Badminton Stadium was officially opened by the Governor of Singapore, Sir John Fearns Nicoll.

In 1958, the stadium was managed by the Land Office on trust on behalf of the SBA.

On 1 September 1999, the hall became the first sports facility in Singapore to be marked as a historic site by the National Heritage Board. It was marked as a historic site due to its hosting of two Thomas Cup and also the vote-counting station for the 1962 Singaporean integration referendum on the merger of Singapore, Brunei, Sarawak, Sabah and the Federation of the Malay States.

In July 2007, the SBA announced plans to close the Singapore Badminton Hall, after the 30-year lease between the Singapore Sports Council and the Urban Redevelopment Authority ceases on 31 January 2008. The SBA's lease is for the badminton hall and its adjacent building, which houses the association's office and practice courts. Its annual lease of under S$100,000 would be increased to S$1.164 million if the SBA were to renew it, but the association has no plans to do so. The SBA then relocated to the Singapore Sports School and relocated again to the Singapore Sports Hub, after the latter's construction was completed in 2014.

In January 2008, the Hall was then returned to the Urban Redevelopment Authority (URA).

=== As Guillemard Village ===
In May 2009, after a S$2-million refurbishment, the Hall started its operation as Guillemard Village managed by Turf City Management. The site was re-developed as a centre for food and beverage as well as leisure. Guillemard Village was refurbished to retain the essence of the past, hopefully reminding people of the Gay World.

In November 2009, a 24-hour prawn fishing restaurant known as Geylang Prawn Fishing Restaurant was opened, which occupied half of the former sports hall. In August 2011, The restaurant was closed at the hall upon its lease ended and moved to Punggol East Golf Club. Other tenants included Brawn & Brains Cafe, Onsight Climbing Gym and GymKraft.

=== As Singapore Badminton Stadium ===
On 1 September 2023, the SBA signed a tenancy agreement with Singapore Land Authority (SLA) on a 3+3+3-year term to take over the premises (including the adjacent 102 Guillemard Road building) for development. The original hall will be renamed back as Singapore Badminton Stadium while the new building at 102 Guillemard Road will be named KFF Badminton Arena. The SBA setup a private subsidiary, SBA@Guillemard, to manage both the stadium and arena.

The two buildings were to be developed into a sports and entertainment hub with nine courts at the 1,300-seater hall and another three more premium air-conditioned courts with corporate boxes at the 102 Guillemard Road. The courts were equipped by JK Technology with technology to aid with training. The buildings would consist of a members lounge, gym and food and beverage facilities.

Anytime Fitness, a 24 hour gym, opened at 100 Guillemard Road. Food and beverage facilities such as Hey Kee, a Hong Kong da pai dong style restaurant opened at 102 Guillemard Road with Vernacular Coffee and Get Some bistro at 100 Guillemard Road.

The stadium and arena were planned to reopen on 9 August 2024, Singapore National Day.

== Events ==
=== Thomas Cup ===
Wong Peng Soon (left), captain of the Malaya Thomas Cup team, being congratulated by Ole Jensen from Denmark (right) at the 1955 Thomas Cup.

Although it was completed in May 1952, the Singapore Badminton Stadium was not ready for the 2nd Thomas Cup Tournament that was scheduled on 27–28 May that year. The stadium was not being used for the 1952 Thomas Cup because it was thought to be a gamble to let the Malayan team to perform in a hall environment to which they might not be familiar with.

The tournament was instead held at the Happy World Stadium, where the Malayan Team, which included Wong Peng Soon, Ong Poh Lim and Ismail Marjan, successfully defended their title.

In 1955, the stadium finally hosted the Thomas Cup which the Malayan team succeeded in defending their champion title again.

In 1958, the stadium hosted the Thomas Cup again.

=== Political events ===
People gathered outside the Singapore Badminton Stadium to wait for the results of the referendum to form Malaysia in 1962

In June 1959, a crowd of nearly 7,000 workers from 63 trade unions gathered at the Singapore Badminton Stadium to celebrate the advent of the new government after the general election, which was won by the People's Action Party.

On 1 September 1962, the Singapore Badminton Stadium was the vote counting station for a referendum to Tunku Abdul Rahman's suggestion to merge Singapore, Brunei, Sarawak, Sabah and the Federation of Malaya to form Malaysia. About 71 percent of the electorate voted for the merger proposal. At 11.15am on 3 September, Prime Minister Lee Kuan Yew speaks of 'the clear and decisive verdict' of the people of Singapore for merger with Malaysia, and 'the awful moment of truth' for the Communists. This speech came immediately after the announcement of the Government's victory over the Barisan Socialis-led call to cast blank votes in the referendum. (See: Singaporean national referendum, 1962)

=== Concerts ===
On 7 December 1959, the Singapore Badminton Stadium was the venue of Radio Singapore's all-star variety show, Puspawarna Singapura, which was hosted by P. Ramlee.

In February 1965, the British rock group The Rolling Stones held a one-night performance at the Singapore Badminton Stadium. The crowd was so excited that a wall erected for the concert collapsed.

=== SEA Games ===
The Hall served as the venue for badminton in the 12th and 17th Southeast Asian Games, hosted by Singapore in 1983 and 1993 respectively.

== Chronicles (1950s – 2024) ==
1959-1960

The year 1959 saw mostly the non-sporting events taking place in the Stadium. The People's Action Party (PAP) had made public speech to celebrate their victory in the general election. The Hall also served to hold entertainment activities such as dramas, dances and even erotic strip dance by the famous local "Strip Dancing Queen" Rose Chan. In addition, from 1959 to 1960, Puspawarna Singapura, live recordings of variety shows were held by the Radio Singapore with P. Ramlee (famous Malaysian singer, producer, composer) as the main host. It could be seen that the usage of the sports hall was less strict and exclusive. It might be out of an urge for SBA to increase its source of income and to clear off its debt from the construction.

1962

In 1962, the Stadium was used as a counting station for the voting over matter of Malaya-Singapore merger where the People's Action Party had a clear-cut victory. The political significance of the Stadium was clear enough—the hall was a key connection spot between the ruling party and its supporters. On the other hand, during the times of trade union riots, the hall acted as a gathering spot for the unions. Such preference possibly reflected the existence of hall more than just a building but an essential space where political activities or social movements from the working class could be made widely known to the rest of the society.

1965

A British rock band, The Rolling Stones, conducted their one-stop performance at the badminton stadium. The over-excited spectators resulted in the collapse of a wall.

1977

In 1977, the Singapore Sports Council discussed with SBA to take over the stadium. In 1978, upon acquiring the stadium, it was refurbished and renamed as the Singapore Badminton Hall. The Hall was assigned to be one of the event venues for the Southeast Asian Games, which had its 12th (Year 1983) and 17th (Year 1993) games hosted in the Hall.

1983

12th Southeast Asian Game badminton tournament was hosted in the Hall.

1986

A tenant, the Fatty Weng restaurant, was opened at the Singapore Badminton Hall in 1986.

1993

17th Southeast Asian Game badminton tournament was held.

2008

In January 2008, the SBA headquarters and Singapore Badminton Hall was officially closed down after the land lease contract ended and the Singapore Sports Council decided not to renew it given the rising price of the new lease. The Hall was then returned to the Urban Redevelopment Authority (URA).

== See also ==
- Sport in Singapore
