= Philippines at the 2003 SEA Games =

Philippines at the 2003 Southeast Asian Games
- IOC code: PHI
- NOC: Philippine Olympic Committee
- Website: www.olympic.ph (in English)

in Vietnam
- Flag bearer: Eduardo Buenavista
- Medals Ranked 4th: Gold 49 Silver 55 Bronze 75 Total 179

Southeast Asian Games appearances (overview)
- 1977; 1979; 1981; 1983; 1985; 1987; 1989; 1991; 1993; 1995; 1997; 1999; 2001; 2003; 2005; 2007; 2009; 2011; 2013; 2015; 2017; 2019; 2021; 2023; 2025; 2027; 2029

The Philippines participated in the 22nd Southeast Asian Games held in Hanoi, Vietnam from 5 to 13 December 2003.

== SEA Games performance ==
The country sent the 600-strong contingent, the biggest sent abroad in the past three editions. The increase in the Gold tally is a reflection of the jacked up number of events the Philippines took part as they bested its dismal tally in Malaysia two years ago.

The Philippines participated in 28 sports. Track and Field wound up as the biggest earner with eight golds to show, followed by Wushu with six and Taekwondo with five.

== Medalists ==
=== Gold ===
No.	Medal	Name	Sport	Event
1	Gold	Philippines	Archery	Women's team recurve
2	Gold	Ernie Candelario	Athletics	Men's 400m
3	Gold	John Lozada	Athletics	Men's 1500m
4	Gold	Eduardo Buenavista	Athletics	Men's 10000m
5	Gold	Rene Herrera	Athletics	Men's 3000m Steeplechase
6	Gold	Allan Ballester	Athletics	Men's Marathon
7	Gold	Arniel Ferrera	Athletics	Men's hammer throw
8	Gold	Danilo Fresnido	Athletics	Men's javelin throw
9	Gold	Lerma Gabito	Athletics	Women's long jump
10	Gold	Philippines	Basketball	Men's team
11	Gold	Lee Van Corteza	Billiards	Men's 8-ball pool singles
12	Gold	Lee Van Corteza Warren Kiamco	Billiards	Men's 9-ball pool doubles
13	Gold	Harry Tañamor	Boxing	Up to 48 kg
14	Gold	Eugenio Torre; Mark Paragua; Buenaventura Villamayor; Ronald Dableo	Chess	Men's team Classical
15	Gold	Eugenio Torre; Mark Paragua; Buenaventura Villamayor; Rogelio Antonio Jr. Jayson Gonzales	Chess	Men's team Rapid
16	Gold	Mark Paragua	Chess	Men's individual Rapid
17	Gold	Eusebio Quiñones	Cycling	Men's 35 km Cross-Country
18	Gold	Rexel Ryan Fabriga	Diving	Men's 10m platform
19	Gold	Rexel Ryan Fabriga; Jaime Asok	Diving	Men's 10m synchronised platform
20	Gold	Philippines	Fencing	Men's team Epee
21	Gold	Walbert Mendoza Gumabao	Fencing	Men's individual Sabre
22	Gold	Philippines	Fencing	Men's team Foil
23	Gold	Lenita Garcia	Fencing	Women's individual Foil
24	Gold	Nell Faustino	Gymnastics	Rings
25	Gold	Roell Ramirez	Gymnastics	Men's vault
26	Gold	John Baylon	Judo	Up to 81 kg
27	Gold	Gilbert Ramirez	Judo	Up to 73 kg
28	Gold	Helen Dawa	Judo	Up to 45 kg
29	Gold	Gretchen Malalad	Karatedo	Kumite above 60 kg
30	Gold	Miguel Molina	Swimming	Men's 200m freestyle
31	Gold	Miguel Mendoza	Swimming	Men's 1500m freestyle
32	Gold	Eric Ang Jethro Dionisio Jaime Recio	Shooting	Men's Trap Team
33	Gold	Donald Geisler	Taekwondo	Men's Lightweight
34	Gold	Dax Alberto Morfe	Taekwondo	Men's Middleweight
35	Gold	Margarita Bonifacio	Taekwondo	Women's Middleweight
36	Gold	Veronica Domingo	Taekwondo	Women's Lightweight
37	Gold	M. Antoinette Rivero	Taekwondo	Women's Featherweight
38	Gold	Philippines	Traditional Boat Racing	Men's 500m
39	Gold	Melchor Tumasis	Wrestling	Men's Greco-Roman 60 kg
40	Gold	Marcus Valda	Wrestling	Men's Greco-Roman Under 96 kg
41	Gold	Marcus Valda	Wrestling	Men's freestyle Under 96 kg
42	Gold	Ma. Cristina Villanueva	Wrestling	Women's freestyle 51 kg
43	Gold	Eduard Folayang	Wushu	Men's Sanshou 70 kg
44	Gold	Arvin Ting	Wushu	Men's gunshu/Staff
45	Gold	Arvin Ting	Wushu	Men's daoshu
46	Gold	Willy Wang	Wushu	Men's Qiangshu/Spear Play
47	Gold	Willy Wang	Wushu	Men's Jianshu
48	Gold	Dolley Andres	Wushu	Women's Sanshou 52 kg

=== Silver ===
No.	Medal	Name	Sport	Event
1	Silver	Jimar Aing	Athletics	Men's 400m
2	Silver	Eduardo Buenavista	Athletics	Men's 5000m
3	Silver	Jimar Aing; Ronnie Marfil; Ernie Candelario; Rodrigo Tanuan	Athletics	Men's 4x400m Relay
4	Silver	Jaime Asok; Niño Carog	Diving	Men's 3m synchronised springboard
5	Silver	Sheila Mae Perez	Diving	Women's 3m springboard
6	Silver	Macario Vizcayno	Fencing	Men's individual Epee
7	Silver	Philippines	Fencing	Men's team sabre
8	Silver	Veena Nuestro	Fencing	Women's individual Foil
9	Silver	Miguel Mendoza	Swimming	Men's 400m freestyle
10	Silver	Miguel Molina	Swimming	Men's 200m individual medley
11	Silver	Miguel Molina	Swimming	Men's 400m individual medley
12	Silver	Lizza Danila	Swimming	Women's 100m backstroke
13	Silver	Lizza Danila	Swimming	Women's 200m backstroke
14	Silver	Maria Georgina Gordeonco	Swimming	Women's 200m butterfly
	Silver	Alexander Briones	Taekwondo	Men's welterweight
	Silver	Dindo Simpao	Taekwondo	Men's Heavyweight
	Silver	Kalindi Tamayo	Taekwondo	Women's Bantamweight

=== Bronze ===
No.	Medal	Name	Sport	Event
1	Bronze	Florante Matan	Archery	Men's individual recurve
2	Bronze	Philippines	Archery	Men's team recurve
3	Bronze	John Lozada	Athletics	Men's 800m
4	Bronze	Joebert Delicano	Athletics	Men's triple jump
5	Bronze	Fidel Gallenero	Athletics	Men's Decathlon
6	Bronze	Mercidita Manipol	Athletics	Women's 10000m
7	Bronze	Melinda Manahan	Athletics	Women's 20km Walk
8	Bronze	Kennevic Asuncion; Kennie Asuncion	Badminton	Mixed doubles
9	Bronze	Philippines	Basketball	Women's team
10	Bronze	Sheerie Joy Lumibao; Kathryn Ann Cruz; Cristine Rose Mariano; Beverly Mendoza	Chess	Women's team Classical
11	Bronze	Eugenio Torre	Chess	Men's individual Classical
12	Bronze	Beverly Mendoza	Chess	Women's individual Rapid
13	Bronze	Zardo Domenios	Diving	Men's 3m springboard
14	Bronze	Sheila Mae Perez; Cesiel Domenios	Diving	Women's 3m synchronised springboard
15	Bronze	Joanna Villareal	Fencing	Women's individual Sabre
16	Bronze	Roell Ramirez; Bonnie Brydon Sy Jr. Al Ramirez; Ronnie Ramirez; Rico Ramirez; Nell Faustino	Gymnastics	Men's team All-Around
17	Bronze	Roell Ramirez	Gymnastics	Men's individual all-around
18	Bronze	Bonnie Brydon Sy Jr.	Gymnastics	Parallel Bars
19	Bronze	Phoebe Danielle Espiritu	Gymnastics	Uneven Bars
20	Bronze	Jill Anne Roy; Brian Peralta	Gymnastics	Mixed Double Aerobics
	Bronze	Roberto Cruz	Taekwondo	Men's finweight
	Bronze	Jeferthom Go	Taekwondo	Men's Featherweight
	Bronze	Manuel Rivero	Taekwondo	Men's Bantamweight
	Bronze	Ann Margaret Boyle	Taekwondo	Women's Heavyweight
	Bronze	Eva Marie Ditan	Taekwondo	Women's finweight
	Bronze	Sally Solis	Taekwondo	Women's welterweight
21	Bronze	Czarina Mae Arevalo; Alyssa Anne Labay; Anna Patricia Santos	Tennis	Women's team
22	Bronze	Alvin Delos Santos	Weightlifting	Men's +94kg
23	Bronze	Miguel Molina	Swimming	Men's 100m freestyle
24	Bronze	Miguel Molina	Swimming	Men's 400m freestyle
25	Bronze	Miguel Molina	Swimming	Men's 200m breaststroke
26	Bronze	Carlo Piccio	Swimming	Men's 400m individual medley
27	Bronze	Philippines	Swimming	Women's 4x200m freestyle relay
28	Bronze	Philippines	Volleyball	Women's team
	Bronze	Philippines	Waterpolo	Men's team

=== Multiple ===
Name	Sport	1st place, gold medalist(s)	2nd place, silver medalist(s)	3rd place, bronze medalist(s)	Total
Mark Paragua	Chess	3	0	0	3
Eugenio Torre	Chess	2	0	1	3
Buenaventura Villamayor	Chess	2	0	0	2
Rexel Ryan Fabriga	Diving	2	0	0	2
Miguel Molina	Swimming	1	2	3	6
Eduardo Buenavista	Athletics	1	1	0	2
Ernie Candelario	Athletics	1	1	0	2
Jaime Asok	Diving	1	1	0	2
Miguel Mendoza	Swimming	1	1	0	2
Roelle Ramirez	Gymnastics	1	0	2	3
John Lozada	Athletics	1	0	1	2
Nell Faustino	Gymnastics	1	0	1	2
Jimar Aing	Athletics	0	2	0	2
Lizza Danila	Swimming	0	2	0	2
Sheila Mae Perez	Diving	0	1	1	2
Beverly Mendoza	Chess	0	0	2	2
Bonnie Brydon Sy Jr.	Gymnastics	0	0	2	2

== Medal summary ==
=== By sports ===
Sport	Gold	Silver	Bronze	Total
Fencing	10	9	1	20
Aquatics	9	9	12	30
Athletics	8	6	5	19
Wushu	6	5	4	15
Taekwondo	5	3	6	14
Wrestling	4	8	6	18
Judo	3	4	4	11
Shooting	3	3	1	7
Billiards and snooker	3	2	5	10
Archery	3	0	5	8
Chess	3	0	3	6
Gymnastics	2	0	6	8
Boxing	1	5	1	7
Karate	1	2	8	11
Cycling	1	2	3	6
Traditional boat race	1	1	0	2
Basketball	1	0	1	2
Rowing	0	6	3	9
Pencak silat	0	4	3	7
Bodybuilding	0	1	1	2
Tennis	0	0	3	3
Badminton	0	0	1	1
Canoeing	0	0	1	1
Sepak takraw	0	0	1	1
Volleyball	0	0	1	1
Weightlifting	0	0	1	1
Totals (26 entries)	64	70	86	220
