= Chess at the 2003 SEA Games =

Chess at the 2003 Southeast Asian Games
- Venue: Vân Đồn sports centre
- Location: Ho Chi Minh City, Vietnam
- Start date: 5 December 2003
- End date: 13 December 2003

The chess events at the 22nd Southeast Asian Games were held from 5 to 13 December 2003 at the Vân Đồn sports centre in District 4 of Ho Chi Minh City. This was the first time chess was contested for medals at the Southeast Asian Games. Medals were awarded in eight categories: men's and women's individual and team performances in the combined event held at classical time controls, men's and women's individual competitions at rapid time controls, and men's and women's team competitions at rapid time controls.

== Participating nations ==
- Brunei
- Indonesia
- Laos
- Malaysia
- Myanmar
- Philippines
- Singapore
- Thailand
- Vietnam

Of the nine countries that participated, six competed in all the events. Brunei did not contest the women's rapid events, Thailand only contested the men's events, and Laos sent one player to compete in the men's classical tournament.

== Results summary ==
=== Individual rapid ===
On 5 and 6 December, seventeen men and twelve women competed separately in two single-elimination tournaments held at rapid time controls (all moves in 25 minutes, plus 10 seconds increment per move). Participating countries entered a maximum of two players into each rapid tournament.

In the semifinals of the men's tournament, Mark Paragua from the Philippines defeated Vietnam's Đào Thiên Hải 3–1, and Jason Goh Koon-Jong defeated Wu Shaobin (both from Singapore) 3–1. Paragua defeated Goh 1½–½ in the final to win the gold medal.

In the semifinals of the women's tournament, Vietnam's Lê Kiều Thiên Kim defeated Beverly Mendoza from the Philippines 1½–½, and Vietnam's Hoàng Thị Bảo Trâm defeated Malaysia's Siti Zulaikha Foudzi 1½–½. Paragua defeated Goh 3–2 in the final to win the gold medal.

=== Team rapid ===
On 7 December, eight men's teams and six women's teams competed separately in two rapid tournaments played on four boards. In both tournaments, the teams were divided into two groups and played a round-robin group stage. Two teams from each group qualified for the playoffs.

In the semifinals of the men's tournament, the Philippines defeated Singapore 3–1, and Vietnam defeated Malaysia 3½–½. In the final, the Philippines and Vietnam drew their first match 2–2 before the Philippines won a tiebreak match 3–1 to win the gold medal.

In the semifinals of the women's tournament, Indonesia defeated Singapore 2½–1½, and Vietnam defeated Myanmar 4–0. In the final, Vietnam and Indonesia drew their first match 2–2 and a tiebreak match 2–2 before Vietnam prevailed in a sudden-death playoff 2–1 to win the gold medal.

=== Individual and team classical ===
Men and women competed separately in two nine-round Swiss-system tournaments held at classical time controls (all moves in 90 minutes, plus 30 seconds increment per move) from 8 to 13 December. Medals were awarded to the best individual performances in each tournament, although it appears no country was allowed to win more than two individual classical medals. Also, the best four scores of players from each country were summed up to create a team score, and medals were awarded to the three highest team scores in each event.

In the men's tournament, Indonesia's Utut Adianto and Susanto Megaranto won the individual gold and silver medals respectively, and Eugenio Torre of the Philippines picked up the bronze medal. The Philippines won the team gold medal for the best aggregate score of its four highest-scoring players, while Indonesia took silver and Vietnam took bronze.

In the women's tournament, Vietnam's Nguyễn Thị Thanh An won the individual gold medal with a score of 8/9. Lê Kiều Thiên Kim and Lê Thị Phương Liên tied for second with 6½/9, and Lê Kiều Thiên Kim was awarded the silver medal on tiebreaks. Vietnam's Hoàng Thanh Trang and Malaysia's Siti Zulaikha Foudzi tied for fourth with 6/9, and Foudzi was awarded the bronze medal. Vietnam won the team gold medal for the best aggregate score of its four highest-scoring players, while Indonesia took silver and the Philippines took bronze.

== Medal summary ==
Event	Gold		Silver		Bronze	
Men's team – classical	Philippines (PHI); Eugenio Torre; Mark Paragua; Buenaventura Villamayor; Ronald Dableo	23	Indonesia (INA); Utut Adianto; Susanto Megaranto; Hamdani Rudin; Dede Liu	22½	Vietnam (VIE); Đào Thiên Hải; Phạm Minh Hoàng; Nguyễn Anh Dũng; Bùi Vinh	20
Women's team – classical	Vietnam (VIE); Nguyễn Thị Thanh An; Lê Kiều Thiên Kim; Lê Thị Phương Liên; Hoàng Thanh Trang	27	Indonesia (INA); Lisa Karlina Lumongdong; Neiko Rasaki Rohanis; Upi Darmayana Tamin; Ai Jackiah	20½	Philippines (PHI); Sheerie Joy Lomibao; Kathryn Ann Cruz; Cristine Rose Mariano; Beverly Mendoza	19½
Men's team – rapid	Philippines (PHI); Eugenio Torre; Rogelio Antonio Jr. Buenaventura Villamayor; Mark Paragua; Jayson Gonzales	–	Vietnam (VIE); Đào Thiên Hải; Nguyễn Anh Dũng; Từ Hoàng Thông; Phạm Minh Hoàng; Nguyễn Văn Huy	–	Singapore (SIN); Wu Shaobin; Wong Meng Kong; Jason Goh Koon-Jong; Goh Wei Ming; Evan Yeo Min-Yang	–
Men's team – rapid	Philippines (PHI); Eugenio Torre; Rogelio Antonio Jr. Buenaventura Villamayor; Mark Paragua; Jayson Gonzales	–	Vietnam (VIE); Đào Thiên Hải; Nguyễn Anh Dũng; Từ Hoàng Thông; Phạm Minh Hoàng; Nguyễn Văn Huy	–	Malaysia (MAS); Nicholas Chan; Lim Chuin Hoong; Jonathan Chuah; Marcus Chan; Ismail Ahmad	–
Women's team – rapid	Vietnam (VIE); Nguyễn Thị Thanh An; Lê Kiều Thiên Kim; Lê Thị Phương Liên; Hoàng Thị Út; Lương Minh Huệ	–	Indonesia (INA); Lisa Karlina Lumongdong; Evi Lindiawati; Upi Darmayana Tamin; Irine Kharisma Sukandar; Sulung Wahyuningsih	–	Singapore (SIN); Lin Ai Lin; Liu Yang; Jeslin Tay Li-Jin; Rolles May Li; Suzanna Sia Xin-Yun	–
Women's team – rapid	Vietnam (VIE); Nguyễn Thị Thanh An; Lê Kiều Thiên Kim; Lê Thị Phương Liên; Hoàng Thị Út; Lương Minh Huệ	–	Indonesia (INA); Lisa Karlina Lumongdong; Evi Lindiawati; Upi Darmayana Tamin; Irine Kharisma Sukandar; Sulung Wahyuningsih	–	Myanmar (MYA); Tin Lay Shue; Zin Mar Min Than; Thandar Aye Win; Win Win Thue; Nan M K Khine Hlyan	–
Men's individual – classical	Utut Adianto; Indonesia	7½	Susanto Megaranto; Indonesia	6½	Eugenio Torre; Philippines	6½
Women's individual – classical	Nguyễn Thị Thanh An; Vietnam	8	Lê Kiều Thiên Kim; Vietnam	6½	Siti Zulaikha Foudzi; Malaysia	6
Men's individual – rapid	Mark Paragua; Philippines	–	Jason Goh Koon-Jong; Singapore	–	Đào Thiên Hải; Vietnam	–
Men's individual – rapid	Mark Paragua; Philippines	–	Jason Goh Koon-Jong; Singapore	–	Wu Shaobin; Singapore	–
Women's individual – rapid	Hoàng Thị Bảo Trâm; Vietnam	–	Lê Kiều Thiên Kim; Vietnam	–	Siti Zulaikha Foudzi; Malaysia	–
Women's individual – rapid	Hoàng Thị Bảo Trâm; Vietnam	–	Lê Kiều Thiên Kim; Vietnam	–	Beverly Mendoza; Philippines	–

== Medal table ==
* Host nation (Vietnam)

Rank	Nation	Gold	Silver	Bronze	Total
1	Vietnam (VIE)*	4	3	2	9
2	Philippines (PHI)	3	0	3	6
3	Indonesia (INA)	1	4	0	5
4	Singapore (SIN)	0	1	3	4
5	Malaysia (MAS)	0	0	3	3
6	Myanmar (MYA)	0	0	1	1
Totals (6 entries)		8	8	12	28
