= Wushu at the 2003 SEA Games =

- Venue: Trinh Hoai Duc Sports Center, Hanoi
- Dates: 10-12 December 2003

Wushu at the 2003 Southeast Asian Games was held in the Trinh Hoai Duc Sports Center, Hanoi, Vietnam from 10 to 12 December 2003.

== Medal table ==
* Host nation (Vietnam)

Rank	Nation	Gold	Silver	Bronze	Total
1	Vietnam (VIE)*	14	9	8	31
2	Philippines (PHI)	6	4	5	15
3	Myanmar (MYA)	4	7	5	16
4	Malaysia (MAS)	2	1	5	8
5	Singapore (SIN)	1	4	2	7
6	Thailand (THA)	1	1	6	8
7	Indonesia (INA)	0	2	5	7
8	Laos (LAO)	0	0	3	3
Totals (8 entries)		28	28	39	95

== Medalists ==
=== Men's taolu ===
Event	Gold	Silver	Bronze
Changquan	Ang Eng Chong; Malaysia	Willy Wang; Philippines	Oh Poh Soon; Malaysia
Daoshu	Arvin Ting; Philippines	Truong Quoc Chi; Vietnam	Aung Si Thu; Myanmar
Jianshu	Willy Wang; Philippines	Pyi Wai Phyo; Myanmar	Nguyen Doan Trung; Vietnam; Oh Poh Soon; Malaysia
Qiangshu	Willy Wang; Philippines	Nguyen Doan Trung; Vietnam	Wanchalerm Puang Thong; Thailand
Gunshu	Arvin Ting; Philippines	Pwi Wai Phyo; Myanmar	Nguyen Tien Dat; Vietnam
Nanquan	Ho Ro Bin; Malaysia	Le Quang Huy; Vietnam	Zaw Zaw Moe; Myanmar
Nandao	Tran Trong Tuan; Vietnam	Ho Ro Bin; Malaysia	Le Quang Huy; Vietnam
Nangun	Le Quang Huy; Vietnam	Zaw Zaw Moe; Myanmar	Pui Fook Chien; Malaysia
Taijiquan	Goh Qiu Bin; Singapore	Yang Yong Kai; Singapore	Chin Foh Nan; Malaysia
Taijijian	Nguyen Anh Minh; Vietnam	Yang Yong Kai; Singapore	Howandy Santoso; Indonesia; Goh Qiu Bin; Singapore

=== Men's sanda ===
Event	Gold	Silver	Bronze
Sanshou (48 kg)	Le Cong But; Vietnam	Catalan Rene; Philippines	Thein Htikeoo; Myanmar
Sanshou (48 kg)	Le Cong But; Vietnam	Catalan Rene; Philippines	Samrit Yossapol; Thailand
Sanshou (52 kg)	Phan Quoc Vinh; Vietnam	Yan Win Kyi; Myanmar	Hangmahongsa; Laos
Sanshou (52 kg)	Phan Quoc Vinh; Vietnam	Yan Win Kyi; Myanmar	Suchat Suktam; Thailand
Sanshou (56 kg)	Ha Hone; Myanmar	Tran Nhat Huy; Vietnam	Nganhayna Rexel; Philippines
Sanshou (56 kg)	Ha Hone; Myanmar	Tran Nhat Huy; Vietnam	Phichit Chaisak; Thailand
Sanshou (60 kg)	Diep Bao Minh; Vietnam	Pasiwat Joseph; Philippines	Jacki Susanto; Indonesia
Sanshou (60 kg)	Diep Bao Minh; Vietnam	Pasiwat Joseph; Philippines	Wichan Toonkaratoak; Thailand
Sanshou (65 kg)	Saksit Kaewphet; Thailand	Le Thanh Hoa; Vietnam	Saw Khaing; Myanmar
Sanshou (65 kg)	Saksit Kaewphet; Thailand	Le Thanh Hoa; Vietnam	Kelly Eric James; Philippines
Sanshou (70 kg)	Folayang Eduard; Philippines	Wiphakdeerattanamanee; Thailand	Sonny Rambing; Indonesia
Sanshou (70 kg)	Folayang Eduard; Philippines	Wiphakdeerattanamanee; Thailand	Phung Anh Tuan; Vietnam

=== Women's talou ===
Event	Gold	Silver	Bronze
Changquan	Nguyễn Thúy Hiền; Vietnam	Đàm Thanh Xuân; Vietnam	Nurdiana; Indonesia
Daoshu	Nguyễn Thúy Hiền; Vietnam	Đàm Thanh Xuân; Vietnam	Nurdiana; Indonesia
Jianshu	Nguyễn Thị Mỹ Đức; Vietnam	Susyana Tjhan; Indonesia	Ma Wai Yi Maung; Myanmar
Gunshu	Đàm Thanh Xuân; Vietnam	Susyana Tjhan; Indonesia	Lee Wen Xin; Singapore
Qiangshu	Nguyễn Thị Mỹ Đức; Vietnam	Nguyễn Thúy Hiền; Vietnam	Loo Sim Fang; Malaysia
Nanquan	Ma Swe Swe Thant; Myanmar	Lily So; Philippines	Nguyễn Phương Lan; Vietnam
Nandao	Nguyễn Thị Ngọc Oanh; Vietnam	Ma Swe Swe Thant; Myanmar	Lily So; Philippines
Nangun	Nguyễn Phương Lan; Vietnam	Ma Swe Swe Thant; Myanmar	Lily So; Philippines
Taijiquan	Khaing Khaing Maw; Myanmar	Jennee Sae Tang; Singapore	Bùi Mai Phương; Vietnam
Taijijian	Khaing Khaing Maw; Myanmar	Yow Wei Quin; Singapore	Bùi Mai Phương; Vietnam

=== Women's sanda ===
Event	Gold	Silver	Bronze
Sanshou (48 kg)	Bui Thu Trang; Vietnam	Thin Zar Soe; Myanmar	Khouanpasa Hanasakda; Laos
Sanshou (48 kg)	Bui Thu Trang; Vietnam	Thin Zar Soe; Myanmar	Lagilag Jenifer; Philippines
Sanshou (52 kg)	Andres Dolly; Philippines	Ngo Thi Ha; Vietnam	Manivath Chanthavongsa; Laos
Sanshou (52 kg)	Andres Dolly; Philippines	Ngo Thi Ha; Vietnam	Maliwan Sopha; Thailand
