= Taekwondo at the 2003 SEA Games =

Taekwondo competition

- Venue: Phu Tho Arena, Ho Chi Minh City
- Dates: 10–12 December 2003

Taekwondo at the 2003 SEA Games was held in Phu Tho Arena, Ho Chi Minh City, Vietnam from 10 to 12 December 2003.

== Schedule ==
Schedule
Event↓/Date →	Dec 10	Dec 11	Dec 12
Men's 54 kg	F		
Men's 58 kg			F
Men's 62 kg	F		
Men's 67 kg	F		
Men's 72 kg		F	
Men's 78 kg		F	
Men's 84 kg		F	
Men's 84+ kg			F
Women's 47 kg			F
Women's 51 kg	F		
Women's 55 kg	F		
Women's 59 kg			F
Women's 63 kg	F		
Women's 67 kg		F	
Women's 72 kg		F	
Women's +72 kg		F	

== Medalist ==
=== Men's events ===
Event	Gold	Silver	Bronze
Fin Weight (54 kg)	Long Điền; Vietnam	Phichet Phibunkhanabak; Thailand	Roberto Cruz; Philippines
Fin Weight (54 kg)	Long Điền; Vietnam	Phichet Phibunkhanabak; Thailand	Phisamone Chaleunsouk; Laos
Fly Weight (58 kg)	Lim Yit Min; Malaysia	Nguyen Quoc Huan; Vietnam	Muhammad Dalam Imam; Indonesia
Fly Weight (58 kg)	Lim Yit Min; Malaysia	Nguyen Quoc Huan; Vietnam	Ussadate Sutthikunkarn; Thailand
Bantam Weight (62 kg)	Derry Dharmansyah Maulana; Indonesia	Vu Anh Tuan; Vietnam	Manuel Rivero. Jr; Philippines
Bantam Weight (62 kg)	Derry Dharmansyah Maulana; Indonesia	Vu Anh Tuan; Vietnam	Wichit Sittikun; Thailand
Feather Weight (67 kg)	Cao Trong Chinh; Vietnam	Amith Sihalat; Laos	Si Thu Win; Myanmar
Feather Weight (67 kg)	Cao Trong Chinh; Vietnam	Amith Sihalat; Laos	Jefethom Go; Philippines
Light Weight (72 kg)	Donald David Geisler. III; Philippines	Rizal Samsir; Indonesia	Bout Vichet; Cambodia
Light Weight (72 kg)	Donald David Geisler. III; Philippines	Rizal Samsir; Indonesia	Thit Lwin; Myanmar
Welther Weight (78 kg)	Kriangkrai Noikoed; Thailand	Alexander Briones; Philippines	Wong Kai Meng; Malaysia
Welther Weight (78 kg)	Kriangkrai Noikoed; Thailand	Alexander Briones; Philippines	Basuki Nugroho; Indonesia
Middle Weight (84 kg)	Dax Alberto Morfe; Philippines	Phan Tan Dat; Vietnam	Zaw Myo Win; Myanmar
Middle Weight (84 kg)	Dax Alberto Morfe; Philippines	Phan Tan Dat; Vietnam	Dereck Afsa; Indonesia
Heavy Weight (+84 kg)	Nguyen Van Hung; Vietnam	Dindo Simpao; Philippines	Irwansyah; Indonesia
Heavy Weight (+84 kg)	Nguyen Van Hung; Vietnam	Dindo Simpao; Philippines	Prawes Sattakom; Thailand

=== Women's events ===
Event	Gold	Silver	Bronze
Fin Weight (47 kg)	Nguyen Thi Huyen Dieu; Vietnam	Thi Ri Tint Lwin; Myanmar	Wornwimon Phuangphee; Thailand
Fin Weight (47 kg)	Nguyen Thi Huyen Dieu; Vietnam	Thi Ri Tint Lwin; Myanmar	Eva Marie Ditan; Philippines
Fly Weight (51 kg)	Yaowapa Boorapolchai; Thailand	Soe Soe Myar; Myanmar	Nguyen Thi Xuan Mai; Vietnam
Fly Weight (51 kg)	Yaowapa Boorapolchai; Thailand	Soe Soe Myar; Myanmar	Lounna Sodouangdenh; Laos
Bantam Weight (55 kg)	Nootcharin Sukkhongdumnoen; Thailand	Kalindi Tamayo; Philippines	Elaine Teo Shueh Fhern; Malaysia
Bantam Weight (55 kg)	Nootcharin Sukkhongdumnoen; Thailand	Kalindi Tamayo; Philippines	Nguyen Thi My Le; Vietnam
Feather Weight (59 kg)	Mary Antoinette Rivero; Philippines	Chen Peiqi; Singapore	Chonnapas Premwaew; Thailand
Feather Weight (59 kg)	Mary Antoinette Rivero; Philippines	Chen Peiqi; Singapore	Efrida Nurphi; Indonesia
Light Weight (63 kg)	Veronica Domingo; Philippines	Pham Thi Phuong Quyen; Vietnam	Emerald Margareth Dien; Indonesia
Light Weight (63 kg)	Veronica Domingo; Philippines	Pham Thi Phuong Quyen; Vietnam	Piyaporn Dongnoi; Thailand
Welther Weight (67 kg)	Sinta Berliana Heru; Indonesia	Lee Pei Fen; Malaysia	Nguyen Thi Ngoc Tram; Vietnam
Welther Weight (67 kg)	Sinta Berliana Heru; Indonesia	Lee Pei Fen; Malaysia	Sally Solis; Philippines
Middle Weight (72 kg)	Margarita Maria Estela Bonifacio; Philippines	Che Chew Chan; Malaysia	Wasittee Prasopsuk; Thailand
Middle Weight (72 kg)	Margarita Maria Estela Bonifacio; Philippines	Che Chew Chan; Malaysia	Le Thi Thy Dan; Vietnam
Heavy Weight (+72 kg)	Tran Thi Ngoc Bich; Vietnam	Lee Wan Yuen; Malaysia	Fong Yee Min; Singapore
Heavy Weight (+72 kg)	Tran Thi Ngoc Bich; Vietnam	Lee Wan Yuen; Malaysia	Ann Margaret Boyle; Philippines
