= Volleyball at the 2003 SEA Games =

- Venue: Ninh Bình Province Gymnasium (indoor); Nam Định Province Gymnasium (beach)
- Dates: 5–12 December 2003

The Volleyball at the 2003 SEA Games was held from 5 to 12 December 2003 in Hanoi, Vietnam.

The indoor volleyball competition took place at Ninh Bình Province Gymnasium, in Ninh Bình Province, and the beach volleyball tournament was held at Nam Định Province Gymnasium in Nam Định Province.

== Medal summary ==
=== Medal table ===
Rank	Nation	Gold	Silver	Bronze	Total
1	Thailand	2	1	1	4
2	Indonesia	2	1	0	3
3	Vietnam	0	2	1	3
4	Myanmar	0	0	1	1
4	Philippines	0	0	1	1
Totals (5 entries)		4	4	4	12

=== Medalists ===
Event	Gold	Silver	Bronze
Men's indoor	Indonesia; Joni Sugiyatno; Uus Susansyah; Risco Herlambang Matulessy; Muhammad Zainudin; Loudryans Arison Maspaitella; I Wayan Windu Segara; I Nyoman Rudi Tirtana; Erwin Rusni; Eko Purnomo; Brian Alfianto; Andri Widiyatmoko; Marjoko Sigit	Thailand; Ratchapoom Samthong; Supachai Sriphum; Panya Makhumleg; Lawrach Tontongkum; Yuttana Kiewpekar; Supachai Jitjumroon; Attaphon Khemdaeng; Songserm Songserm; Terdsak Sungworakan; Wanchai Tabwises; Waroot Wisadsing; Chonlatee Boonsalab	Myanmar; Ye Min Aung; Ye Myint; Myo Htet Myint; Kyaw Swar Win; Kyaw Soe Aung; Kyaw Zin Win Htut; Tin Win Aung; Kyaw Shwe; Win Min Tun; Zaw Lin Oo; Saw Hein Thu; Nyan Lin Aung
Women's indoor	Thailand; Warapan Thinprabat; Nootsara Tomkom; Wanna Buakaew; Nurak Nokputta; Pleumjit Thinkaow; Narumon Khanan; Suphap Phongthong; Piyamas Koijapo; Wilavan Apinyapong; Patcharee Sangmuang; Amporn Hyapha; Bouard Lithawat	Vietnam; Trần Thị Thu Hiền; Đinh Thị Diệu Châu; Nguyễn Thị Ngọc Hoa; Phạm Thị Yến; Vũ Thị Thúy; Nguyễn Thị Thu Ngọc; Lương Thị Thanh; Đặng Thị Hồng; Lê Hương Lan; Bùi Thị Huệ; Phạm Thị Kim Huệ	Philippines; Tina Salak; Mary Jean Balse; Inoferio Bridget Tolentino; Fulo Annaelixa Venus; Cherry Rose Macatangay, Tabuena Cecille Naig; Roxanne Pimentel, Rubie De Leon; Laborte Michelle Padrillan; Pintolo Glenda Echarri; Marietta Carolino; Richelle Carolino
Men's beach	Indonesia; Agus Salim; Koko Prasetyo Darkuncoro	Vietnam; Cao Bảo Quốc; Phạm Bá Chung	Thailand; Sonthi Bunrueang; Thawip Thongkamnerd
Women's beach	Thailand; Jarunee Sannok; Kamoltip Kulna	Indonesia; Timy Yudhani Rahayu; Sitti Nurjanah	Vietnam; Mai Thị Hoa; Đỗ Thị Vĩnh Linh

== Indoor volleyball ==
=== Men's tournament ===
==== Preliminary round ====
===== Group A =====
Pos	Team	Pld	W	L	Pts	SW	SL	SR	SPW	SPL	SPR	Qualification
1	Myanmar	2	2	0	4	6	2	3.000	183	136	1.346	1st–4th place match
2	Vietnam	2	1	1	3	5	3	1.667	171	151	1.132	1st–4th place match
3	Laos	2	0	2	2	0	6	0.000	83	150	0.553	5th–7th place play-off

Date		Score		Set 1	Set 2	Set 3	Set 4	Set 5	Total
Dec	Laos	0–3	Vietnam	10–25	13–25	20–25			43–75
Dec	Myanmar	3–0	Laos	25–14	25–7	25–19			75–40
Dec	Vietnam	2–3	Myanmar	13–25	25–20	21–25	25–23	12–15	96–108

===== Group B =====
Pos	Team	Pld	W	L	Pts	SW	SL	SR	SPW	SPL	SPR	Qualification
1	Thailand	3	3	0	6	9	2	4.500	254	200	1.270	1st–4th place match
2	Indonesia	3	2	1	5	6	3	2.000	259	248	1.044	1st–4th place match
3	Malaysia	3	1	2	4	3	7	0.429	218	239	0.912	5th place match
4	Philippines	3	0	3	3	2	9	0.222	227	261	0.870	5th–7th place play-off

Date		Score		Set 1	Set 2	Set 3	Set 4	Set 5	Total
Dec	Malaysia	0–3	Thailand	21–25	19–25	23–25			63–75
Dec	Indonesia	3–1	Philippines	25–22	25–19	23–25	25–21		98–87
Dec	Thailand	3–0	Philippines	25–18	25–16	25–17			75–51
Dec	Malaysia	0–3	Indonesia	17–25	17–25	23–25			57–75
Dec	Philippines	1–3	Malaysia	25–13	20–25	22–25	22–25		89–88
Dec	Indonesia	2–3	Thailand	9–25	25–19	18–25	25–20	9–15	86–104

==== Knockout stage ====
Semifinals
11 December
Thailand	3
Vietnam	2
11 December
Myanmar	1
Indonesia	3

Gold-medal match
12 December
Thailand	0
Indonesia	3
Bronze-medal match
12 December
Vietnam	2
Myanmar	3

5th–7th place play-off
11 December
Laos	0
Philippines	3

Fifth place match
12 December
Malaysia	0
Philippines	3

===== 5th–7th place play-off =====
Date		Score		Set 1	Set 2	Set 3	Set 4	Set 5	Total
11 Dec	Laos	0–3	Philippines	22–25	13–25	11–25			46–75

===== Semifinals =====
Date		Score		Set 1	Set 2	Set 3	Set 4	Set 5	Total
11 Dec	Thailand	3–2	Vietnam	22–25	25–20	21–25	25–18	15–7	108–95
11 Dec	Myanmar	1–3	Indonesia	20–25	18–25	25–23	14–25		82–98

===== Fifth place match =====
Date		Score		Set 1	Set 2	Set 3	Set 4	Set 5	Total
12 Dec	Philippines	3–0	Malaysia	25–23	25–19	25–20			75–62

===== Bronze-medal match =====
Date		Score		Set 1	Set 2	Set 3	Set 4	Set 5	Total
12 Dec	Vietnam	2–3	Myanmar	23–25	25–18	25–20	22–25	10–15	105–103

===== Gold-medal match =====
Date		Score		Set 1	Set 2	Set 3	Set 4	Set 5	Total
12 Dec	Thailand	0–3	Indonesia	19–25	16–25	21–25			56–75

=== Women's tournament ===
==== Round robin ====
Pos	Team	Pld	W	L	Pts	SW	SL	SR
1	Thailand	5	5	0	10	15	1	15.000
2	Vietnam	5	4	1	9	13	3	4.333
3	Philippines	5	3	2	8	9	8	1.125
4	Indonesia	5	2	3	7	8	8	1.000
5	Singapore	5	1	4	6	5	14	0.357
6	Malaysia	5	0	5	5	3	15	0.200

Date		Score		Set 1	Set 2	Set 3	Set 4	Set 5	Total
Dec	Thailand	3–0	Philippines	25–20	25–17	25–9			75–46
Dec	Singapore	2–3	Indonesia	27–25	18–25	26–24	16–25	9–15	96–114
Dec	Vietnam	3–0	Malaysia	25–16	25–16	25–11			75–43
Dec	Philippines	3–2	Indonesia	25–17	24–26	17–25	25–23	15–12	106–103
Dec	Thailand	3–0	Malaysia	25–13	25–4	25–16			75–33
Dec	Singapore	0–3	Vietnam	16–25	17–25	15–25			48–75
Dec	Malaysia	0–3	Philippines	14–25	18–25	15–25			47–75
Dec	Thailand	3–0	Singapore	25–10	25–7	25–11			75–28
Dec	Indonesia	0–3	Vietnam	18–25	20–25	14–25			52–75
Dec	Malaysia	2–3	Singapore	25–18	19–25	25–15	19–25	8–15	96–98
Dec	Indonesia	0–3	Thailand	13–25	?–25	21–25			34–75
Dec	Philippines	0–3	Vietnam	22–25	21–25	18–25			61–75
Dec	Malaysia	1–3	Indonesia	13–25	25–21	22–25	18–25		78–96
Dec	Singapore	0–3	Philippines	21–25	13–25	19–25			53–75
Dec	Vietnam	1–3	Thailand	17–25	25–22	12–25	19–25		73–97

==== Knockout stage ====
===== Semifinals =====
Date		Score		Set 1	Set 2	Set 3	Set 4	Set 5	Total
11 Dec	Thailand	3–0	Indonesia	25–18	25–14	25–16			75–45
11 Dec	Philippines	2–3	Vietnam	25–23	25–21	21–25	24–26	9–15	104–110

===== Bronze-medal match =====
Date		Score		Set 1	Set 2	Set 3	Set 4	Set 5	Total
12 Dec	Indonesia	2–3	Philippines	25–21	23–25	16–25	25–20	15–17	104–108

===== Gold-medal match =====
Date		Score		Set 1	Set 2	Set 3	Set 4	Set 5	Total
12 Dec	Thailand	3–0	Vietnam	25–17	25–20	25–18			75–55

== Beach volleyball ==
=== Men's tournament ===
==== Preliminary round ====
Pos	Team	Pld	W	L	Pts	SPW	SPL	SPR	SW	SL	SR
1	Indonesia	4	4	0	8	180	121	1.488	8	1	8.000
2	Vietnam	4	3	1	7	164	156	1.051	6	3	2.000
3	Thailand	4	2	2	6	190	162	1.173	6	4	1.500
4	Malaysia	4	1	3	5	121	151	0.801	2	6	0.333
5	Cambodia	4	0	4	4	103	168	0.613	0	8	0.000

	Score		Set 1	Set 2	Set 3
Vietnam	2–0	Malaysia	21–11	21–12	
Indonesia	2–0	Cambodia	21–10	21–6	
Malaysia	0–2	Indonesia	9–21	17–21	
Thailand	2–0	Cambodia	21–13	21–11	
Vietnam	2–1	Thailand	18–21	21–19	15–13
Malaysia	2–0	Cambodia	21–13	21–12	
Indonesia	2–0	Vietnam	21–10	21–16	
Thailand	2–0	Malaysia	21–19	21–11	
Cambodia	0–2	Vietnam	19–21	19–21	
Thailand	1–2	Indonesia	21–15	22–24	10–15

==== Knockout stage ====
===== Gold-medal match =====
Date		Score		Set 1	Set 2	Set 3
10 Dec	Indonesia	2–1	Vietnam	19–21	21–15	15–11

=== Women's tournament ===
==== Preliminary round ====
Pos	Team	Pld	W	L	Pts	SPW	SPL	SPR	SW	SL	SR
1	Thailand	3	3	0	6	126	74	1.703	6	0	MAX
2	Indonesia	3	2	1	5	108	106	1.019	4	2	2.000
3	Vietnam	3	1	2	4	98	114	0.860	2	4	0.500
4	Malaysia	3	0	3	3	88	126	0.698	0	6	0.000

	Score		Set 1	Set 2	Set 3
Malaysia	0–2	Vietnam	12–21	18–21	
Indonesia	2–0	Vietnam	21–19	21–17	
Thailand	2–0	Malaysia	21–11	21–19	
Thailand	2–0	Indonesia	21–14	21–10	
Indonesia	2–0	Malaysia	21–11	21–17	
Thailand	2–0	Vietnam	21–9	21–11	

==== Knockout stage ====
===== Gold-medal match =====
Date		Score		Set 1	Set 2	Set 3
10 Dec	Thailand	2–0	Indonesia	21–18	21–18	
