= Athletics at the 2003 SEA Games =

International athletics championship event

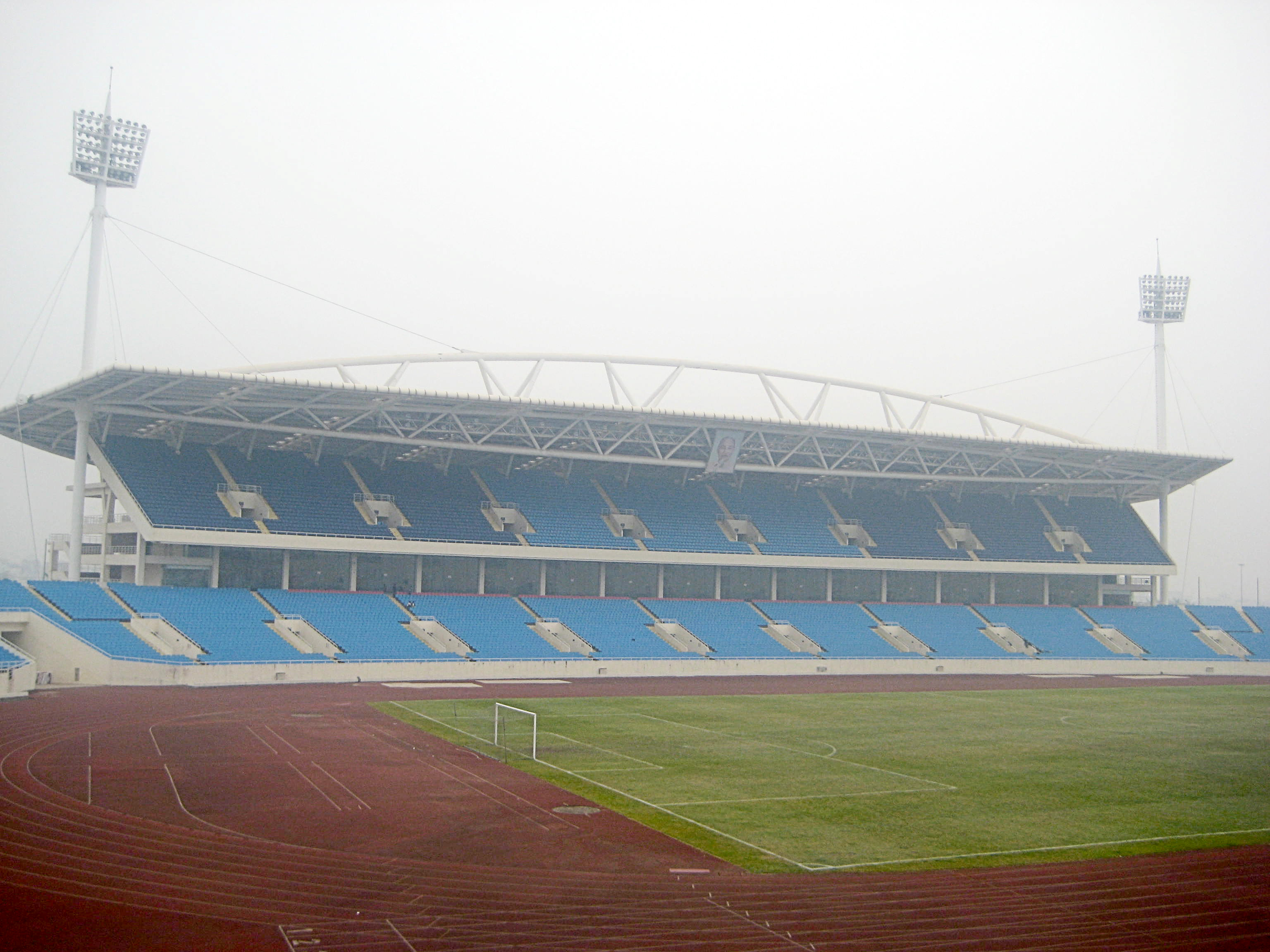
- The host stadium for the athletics competition
- Venue: Mỹ Đình National Stadium
- Location: Hanoi, Vietnam
- Date: 7–12 December 2003
- Nations: 11

At the 22nd SEA Games, the athletics events were held at the Mỹ Đình National Stadium in Hanoi, Vietnam from 7 to 12 December 2003. A total of 45 events were contested, of which 23 by male and 22 by female category.

Thailand easily topped the medal table, winning thirteen gold medals and 39 in total, while the host nation Vietnam came in second with eight golds and 31 altogether. The next best performing nations, the Philippines and Malaysia, were almost dead equal as each won eight events and sixteen medals overall. Singapore and Indonesia both won four golds each. Seven of the eleven nations present at the games won medals in athletics.

The quality of the performances in the events was highly variable: some competitions were closely contested at a level expected of the region, while others were far from an international standard – only one medal was awarded in the men's pole vault as only one athlete managed to clear the bar successfully.

== Medal summary ==
=== Men ===
Event	Gold		Silver		Bronze	
100 metres (Wind: -0.2 m/s)	Nazmizan Muhammad; Malaysia	10.48	Sittichai Suwonprateep; Thailand	10.50	John Herman Muray; Indonesia	10.60
200 metres	Nazmizan Muhammad; Malaysia	21.05	Sittichai Suwonprateep; Thailand	21.23	John Herman Muray; Indonesia	21.31
400 metres	Ernie Candelario; Philippines	47.06	Jimar Aing; Philippines	47.23	Narong Nilploy; Thailand	47.31
800 metres	Lê Văn Dương; Vietnam	1:50.74	Nguyễn Đình Cương; Vietnam	1:52.05	John Lozada; Philippines	1:52.50
1500 metres	John Lozada; Philippines	3:56.80	Trần Văn Thắng; Vietnam	3:57.33	Chamkaur Dhaliwal Singh; Singapore	3:59.34
5000 metres	Boonthung Srisung; Thailand	14:15.20	Eduardo Buenavista; Philippines	14:18.06	Aung Thu Ya; Myanmar	14:21.00
10,000 metres	Eduardo Buenavista; Philippines	29:19.62	Boonthung Srisung; Thailand	29:40.28	Aung Thu Ya; Myanmar	29:49.63
110 metres hurdles	Suphan Wongsriphuck; Thailand	13.92	Mohamed Robani Hassan; Malaysia	14.12	Edy Jakariya; Indonesia	14.29
400 metres hurdles	Apisit Kuttiyawan; Thailand	51.47	Nguyễn Bảo Huy; Vietnam	51.75	Jirachai Linglom; Thailand	52.04
3000 metres steeplechase	Rene Herrera; Philippines	8:50.78	Jirasak Suthichat; Thailand	8:52.47	Nguyễn Kiên Trung; Vietnam	8:52.53
4×100 metres relay	Thailand; Ekkachai Janthana; Vissanu Sophanich; Seksan Wongsala; Sittichai Suwonprateep	40.05	Singapore; Lin Jingze; Hamkah Afik; U. K. Shyam; Poh Seng Song	40.86	Indonesia; Ahmad Sumarsono Sakeh; Kurais; John Herman Muray; Suryo Agung Wibowo	40.91
4×400 metres relay	Thailand; Banjong Lachua; Suwijack Kong Tong; Apisit Kuttiyawan; Narong Nilploy	3:09.33	Philippines; Jimar Aing; Ronnie Marfil; Ernie Candelario; Rodrigo Tanuan	3:10.20	Vietnam; Nguyễn Tinh Tú; Nguyễn Đăng Trường; Nguyễn Văn Tăng; Nguyễn Minh Toàn	3:14.76
Marathon	Allan Ballester; Philippines	2:21.03	Nguyễn Chí Đông; Vietnam	2:21.51	Boonchoo Jandacha; Thailand	2:23.35
20 km walk	Mohd Sharrulhaizy Abdul Rahman; Malaysia	1:31:57	Sakchai Samutkao; Thailand	1:33:30	Veerapun Anunchai; Thailand	1:37:00
High jump	Loo Kum Zee; Malaysia	2.15 m	Ahmad Najwan Aqra; Malaysia	2.10 m	not awarded	
High jump	Loo Kum Zee; Malaysia	2.15 m	Nguyễn Duy Bằng; Vietnam	2.10 m	not awarded	
Pole vault	Amnat Kunpadit; Thailand	4.80 m	only one athlete cleared a height			
Long jump	Mohd Shahrul Amri Suhaimi; Malaysia	7.65 m	Nguyễn Văn Mưa; Vietnam	7.52 m	Mohd Hazuan Zainal Abidin; Malaysia	7.34 m
Triple jump	Nattapon Namkunha; Thailand	15.76 m	Sugeng Jatmiko; Indonesia	15.33 m	Jobert Delicano; Philippines	15.11 m
Shot put	Dong Enxin; Singapore	17.28 m	Sarayudh Pinitjit; Thailand	16.56 m	Chatchawal Polyeng; Thailand	16.48 m
Discus throw	James Wong Tuck Yim; Singapore	56.49 m	Wansawang Sawasdee; Thailand	55.71 m	Kvanchai Numsomboon; Thailand	49.38 m
Hammer throw	Arniel Ferrera; Philippines	55.28 m	Ong Kok Hin; Indonesia	50.89 m	Tee Kui Wong; Malaysia	49.11 m
Javelin throw	Danilo Fresnido; Philippines	67.11 m	Thirdsak Boonjansri; Thailand	66.27 m	Sanya Buathong; Thailand	65.70 m
Decathlon	Mohd Malik Ahmad Tobias; Malaysia	6668 pts	Bùi Văn Hà; Vietnam	6542 pts	Fidel Gallenero; Philippines	6381 pts

=== Women ===
Event	Gold		Silver		Bronze	
100 metres (Wind: +2.1 m/s)	Orranut Klomdee; Thailand	11.51w	Jutama Tawoncharoen; Thailand	11.55w	Vũ Thị Hương; Vietnam	11.59w
200 metres	Nguyễn Thị Tình; Vietnam	23.19	Jutama Tawoncharoen; Thailand	23.49	Orranut Klomdee; Thailand	23.66
400 metres	Nguyễn Thị Tình; Vietnam	51.83	Dương Thị Hồng; Vietnam	55.32	Kay Khine Lwin; Myanmar	55.44
800 metres	Đỗ Thị Bông; Vietnam	2:10.92	Phạm Đình Khánh Đoan; Vietnam	2:11.48	Myint Myint Aye; Myanmar	2:12.73
1500 metres	Nguyễn Lan Anh; Vietnam	4:19.48	Phạm Đình Khánh Đoan; Vietnam	4:27.73	Oliva Sadi; Indonesia	4:27.74
5000 metres	Supriyati Sutono; Indonesia	16:09.39	Phyu War Thet; Myanmar	16:10.57	Đoàn Nữ Trúc Vân; Vietnam	16:12.73
10,000 metres	Đoàn Nữ Trúc Vân; Vietnam	34:48.28	Supriyati Sutono; Indonesia	34:48.93	Mercedita Manipol; Philippines	34:59.62
100 metres hurdles (Wind: +2.2 m/s)	Trecia Roberts; Thailand	13.45 w	Vũ Bích Hường; Vietnam	13.64 w	Moh Siew Wei; Malaysia	13.78 w
400 metres hurdles	Noraseela Mohd Khalid; Malaysia	57.62	Wassana Winatho; Thailand	57.78	Nguyễn Thị Nụ; Vietnam	1:01.79
4×100 metres relay	Thailand; Sujirat Sukka; Orranut Klomdee; Jutama Tawoncharoen; Nongnuch Sanrat	44.82	Vietnam; Mai Thị Phương; Hoàng Thị Duyên; Vũ Thị Hương; Lê Ngọc Phương	45.57	Indonesia; Dedeh Erawati; Irene Truitje Joseph; Deysie Natalia Sumigar; Supiati	45.86
4×400 metres relay	Vietnam; Nguyễn Thị Tình; Dương Thị Hồng Hạnh; Vũ Thị Hương; Nguyễn Thị Nụ	3:38.06	Myanmar; Kay Khine Lwin; Myint Myint Aye; Moe Moe Khine; Lai Lai Win	3:43.66	Thailand; Jutama Tawoncharoen; Saipin Kaewsorn; Saowalee Kaewchuy; Wassana Winatho	3:44.05
Marathon	Erni Ulatningsih; Indonesia	2:52:28	Nguyễn Thị Hoa; Vietnam	2:53:53	Feri Marince Subnafeu; Indonesia	2:56:40
20 km walk	Yuan Yufang; Malaysia	1:39:25	Tersiana Riwu Rohi; Indonesia	1:44.01	Melinda Manahan; Philippines	1:55.06
High jump	Noengrothai Chaipetch; Thailand	1.86 m	Bùi Thị Nhung; Vietnam	1.83 m	Nguyễn Thị Ngọc Tâm; Vietnam	1.80 m
Pole vault	Ni Putu Desi Margawati; Indonesia	3.95 m	Lê Thị Phương; Vietnam	3.80 m	Roslinda Samsu; Malaysia	3.60 m
Long jump	Lerma Gabito; Philippines	6.21 m	Wacharee Rittiwat; Thailand	6.10 m	Bùi Thị Nhật Thanh; Vietnam	5.97 m
Triple jump	Wacharee Rittiwat; Thailand	13.44 m	Nguyễn Mai Quỳnh; Vietnam	13.42 m	Ngew Sin Mei; Malaysia	13.29 m
Shot put	Du Xianhui; Singapore	18.20 m	Zhang Guirong; Singapore	17.96 m	Juttaporn Krasaeyan; Thailand	15.41 m
Discus throw	Zhang Guirong; Singapore	49.91 m	Du Xianhui; Singapore	49.10 m	Juttaporn Krasaeyan; Thailand	48.81 m
Hammer throw	Yurita Ariani Arsyad; Indonesia	49.79 m	Kruawan Taweedech; Thailand	47.35 m	Siti Shahida Abdullah; Malaysia	47.27 m
Javelin throw	Buoban Pamang; Thailand	53.23 m	Zhang Guirong; Singapore	51.66 m	Chanthana Hongsa; Thailand	50.29 m
Heptathlon	Nguyễn Thị Thu Cúc; Vietnam	5274 pts	Watcharaporn Masim; Thailand	4925 pts	Nguyễn Thị Kim Nhung; Vietnam	4673 pts

== Medal table ==
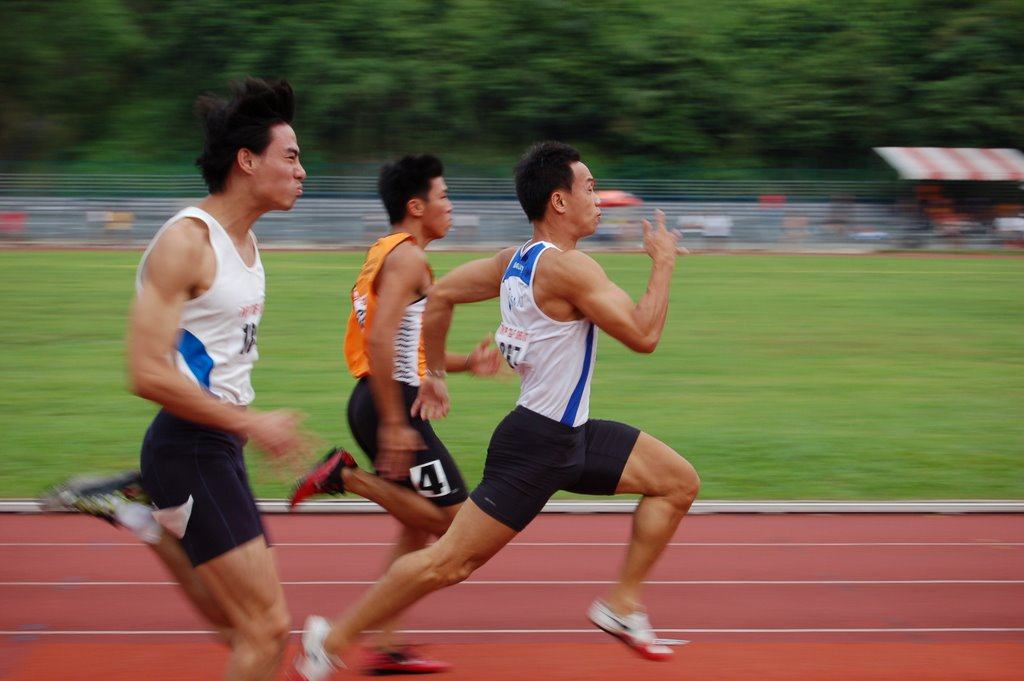
Poh Seng Song anchored the Singaporean relay team to a silver medal.

* Host nation (Vietnam)

Rank	Nation	Gold	Silver	Bronze	Total
1	Thailand	13	14	12	39
2	Vietnam*	8	15	8	31
3	Philippines	8	3	5	16
4	Malaysia	8	2	6	16
5	Singapore	4	4	1	9
6	Indonesia	4	3	7	14
7	Myanmar	0	2	4	6
Totals (7 entries)		45	43	43	131

== Results ==
=== Men's 5000 metres ===
Date	Time	Event
Thursday, 11 December 2003	?	Final

Rank	Athlete	Time	Notes
1st place, gold medalist(s)	Boonthung Srisung (THA)	14:15.20	
2nd place, silver medalist(s)	Eduardo Buenavista (PHI)	14:18.06	
3rd place, bronze medalist(s)	Aung Thu Ya (MYA)	14:21.00	
4	Jauhari Johan (INA)	14:35.74	
5	Julius Sermona (PHI)	14:39.85	
6	Agus Prayogo (INA)	14:44.02	
7	Thiha Aung (MYA)	14:52.11	
8	Trung Kien Nguyen (VIE)	14:52.62	
9	Toan Van Nguyen (VIE)	15:09.57	
10	Amnuay Tongmit (THA)	15:11.93	
—	Xavier do Rego (TLS)	DNS	
