= Lê Văn Dương =

Vietnamese middle-distance runner

Personal information
- Nationality: Vietnamese
- Born: 21 September 1985 (age 40) Kiên Giang Province, Vietnam
- Height: 170 cm (5 ft 7 in)
- Weight: 58 kg (128 lb)

Sport
- Sport: Track and Field
- Event: 800 metres

Achievements and titles
- Personal best: 800 m: 1:49.81 (2004)
Medal record
Men's Athletics
Representing VIE
Southeast Asian Games
Gold medal – first place	2003 Hanoi	Men's 800 m
Gold medal – first place	2005 Manila	Men's 800 m

Lê Văn Dương (born 21 September 1985) is a Vietnamese middle distance athlete whose main event is the 800 metres. Duong competed in the 2004 Summer Olympics. In his heat he came last but he still managed to break the national record with a time of 1:49.81. Overall, Duong came 64th place.

== International competitions ==
Year	Competition	Venue	Position	Notes
Representing the Vietnam
2003	Southeast Asian Games	Hanoi, Vietnam	1st	800 m
2004	Olympic Games	Athens, Greece	64th	800 m
2005	Southeast Asian Games	Manila, Philippines	1st	800 m
2005	Asian Athletics Championships	Incheon, South Korea	9th	800 m

== Personal bests ==
Event	Time	Date	Location
800 m	1:49.81	25 August 2004	Athens, Greece
