= Table tennis at the 2003 SEA Games =

- Venue: Hai Duong Competition Hall
- Location: Hanoi, Vietnam
- Dates: 6–12 December

Table tennis at the 22nd SEA Games was held at the Hai Duong Competition Hall, Hanoi, Vietnam from 6 to 12 December 2003.

== Medalists ==
Event	Gold	Silver	Bronze
Men's singles	Tran Tuan Quynh; Vietnam	Phakphoom Sanguansin; Thailand	Cai Xiao Li; Singapore
Men's singles	Tran Tuan Quynh; Vietnam	Phakphoom Sanguansin; Thailand	Zhang Taiyong; Singapore
Men's doubles	Singapore; Zhang Taiyong; Cai Xiaoli	Thailand; Phuchong Sanguansin; Phakphoom Sanguansin	Vietnam; Nguyen Nam Hai; Tran Tuan Quynh
Men's doubles	Singapore; Zhang Taiyong; Cai Xiaoli	Thailand; Phuchong Sanguansin; Phakphoom Sanguansin	Indonesia; Ismu Harinto; Dian David Mickael Jacobs
Men's team	Singapore; Ho Jia Ren Jason; Cai Xiao Li; Sen Yew Fai Raymond; Zhang Tai Yong	Thailand; Seksak Khomkham; Phuchong Sanguansin; Phakphoom Sanguansin; Pornchai Torsutkanok; Yuttana Tubbunmee	Indonesia; Reno Handoyo; Ismu Harinto; Dian David Mickael Jacobs; Yon Mardyono; Mohamad Zainudin
Men's team	Singapore; Ho Jia Ren Jason; Cai Xiao Li; Sen Yew Fai Raymond; Zhang Tai Yong	Thailand; Seksak Khomkham; Phuchong Sanguansin; Phakphoom Sanguansin; Pornchai Torsutkanok; Yuttana Tubbunmee	Vietnam; Vu Manh Cuong; Nguyen Nam Hai; Doan Kien Quoc; Tran Tuan Quynh; Ho Ngoc Thuan
Women's singles	Li Jiawei; Singapore	Zhang Xueling; Singapore	Beh Lee Wei; Malaysia
Women's singles	Li Jiawei; Singapore	Zhang Xueling; Singapore	Nanthana Komwong; Thailand
Women's doubles	Singapore; Jing Jun Hong; Li Jia Wei	Singapore; Zhang Xue Ling; Tan Paey Fern	Indonesia; Christine Ferliana; Ceria Nilasari Jusma
Women's doubles	Singapore; Jing Jun Hong; Li Jia Wei	Singapore; Zhang Xue Ling; Tan Paey Fern	Thailand; Nanthana Komwong; Anisara Muangsuk
Women's team	Singapore; Tan Paey Fern; Jing Jun Hong; Zhang Xue Ling; Li Jia Wei; Xu Yan	Myanmar; Soe Mya Mya Ayeei; Ei Ei Myo; Tin Tin Than; Hlaing Su Yin; Thwe Thwe Yu	Indonesia; Christine Ferliana; Ceria Nilasari Jusma; Istiyani Lindawati; Ruri Raung; Septy Diah Susiloningrum
Women's team	Singapore; Tan Paey Fern; Jing Jun Hong; Zhang Xue Ling; Li Jia Wei; Xu Yan	Myanmar; Soe Mya Mya Ayeei; Ei Ei Myo; Tin Tin Than; Hlaing Su Yin; Thwe Thwe Yu	Thailand; Nanthana Komwong; Jongkon Kaewsalai; Anisara Muangsuk; Suttilux Rattanaprayoon; Tidaporn Vongboon
Mixed doubles	Singapore; Cai Xiao Li; Li Jia Wei	Singapore; Zhang Tai Yong; Jing Jun Hong	Thailand; Phakpoom Sanguansin; Nanthana Komwong
Mixed doubles	Singapore; Cai Xiao Li; Li Jia Wei	Singapore; Zhang Tai Yong; Jing Jun Hong	Thailand; Phuchong Sanguansin; Anisara Muangsuk

== Medal summary ==
* Host nation (Vietnam)

Rank	Nation	Gold	Silver	Bronze	Total
1	Singapore (SGP)	6	3	2	11
2	Vietnam (VIE)*	1	0	2	3
3	Thailand (THA)	0	3	5	8
4	Myanmar (MYA)	0	1	0	1
5	Indonesia (INA)	0	0	4	4
6	Malaysia (MAS)	0	0	1	1
Totals (6 entries)		7	7	14	28

== See also ==
- Table tennis at the 2003 ASEAN Para Games
