= Edy Jakariya =

Indonesian hurdler

Personal information
- Born: 18 November 1983 (age 42)
- Height: 181 cm (5 ft 11 in)
- Weight: 71 kg (157 lb)

Sport
- Country: Indonesia
- Sport: Athletics
- Event: 110 metres hurdles

Achievements and titles
- Personal best: 14.11 (2004)
Medal record
Southeast Asian Games
Bronze medal – third place	2003 Vietnam	110 m hurdles

Edy Jakariya (born 18 November 1983) is an Indonesian hurdler. He competed in the men's 110 metres hurdles at the 2004 Summer Olympics.
