= Afik (disambiguation) =

Afik (Hebrew: אֲפִיק) is an Israeli settlement and a kibbutz in the Golan Heights.

Afik may also refer to:

- Afik Nissim, Israeli professional basketball player
- Hamkah Afik, Singapore sprinter
