= Megan Paragua =

American chess player (born 2012)

Personal information
- Born: 10 December 2012 (age 13) New York, United States

Chess career
- Country: United States
- Title: FIDE Master (2025); Woman International Master (2026)
- Peak rating: 2300 (August 2025)

Megan Althea Obrero Paragua (born December 10, 2012) is a Filipino American FIDE Master. She is a double gold medal winner in the FIDE World Cadet Rapid and Blitz Championships.

== Biography ==
Paragua was born in New York, to parents Jan Vincent and Jennifer Obrero-Paragua, both from Marilao, Bulacan, Philippines. She is the niece of Mark Paragua, a Filipino chess grandmaster. She is currently studying in Columbia Grammar Preparatory School, New York City.

== Chess career ==
Megan placed 3rd in the Weeramantry National Blitz Tournament, next to Eric Feng and Advaith Vijayakumar, as she scored 6.5 out of 8 points in the 1800-2199 section with 5 wins and 3 draws.

At the age of 10, she achieved the title of Woman FIDE (International Chess Federation) Master at the 33rd Pan-American Youth Chess Festival 2023, which took place in Chicago, Illinois.

During the FIDE World Rapid & Blitz Cadet Chess Championship 2024, she won the gold on both the Rapid and Blitz U12 Girls Division held in Durrës, Albania, making her the first Filipino to win in both categories.
