= Vietnam at the SEA Games =

Vietnam at the Southeast Asian Games
- IOC code: VIE
- NOC: Vietnam Olympic Committee
- Medals Ranked 4th: Gold 1,317 Silver 1,127 Bronze 1,266 Total 3,710

Southeast Asian Games appearances (overview)
- 1989; 1991; 1993; 1995; 1997; 1999; 2001; 2003; 2005; 2007; 2009; 2011; 2013; 2015; 2017; 2019; 2021; 2023; 2025; 2027; 2029

Vietnam first sent their athletes to compete in the Southeast Asian Games in the 1989 Southeast Asian Games in Kuala Lumpur, Malaysia. Vietnam has hosted the games only twice in 2003 and 2021.

Vietnam has won 1269 gold medals, 1097 silver medals, and 1311 bronze medals totaling to 3677 medals since 1991 up to 2023. Vietnam has topped the medal tally thrice, in 2003, 2021 and 2023.

== Medal tally ==
- In 1959 until 1973, Vietnam has won medals under South Vietnam. These are only the medals they won as a unified Vietnam

All-time Medal Tally
Games	Athletes	1st place, gold medalist(s)	2nd place, silver medalist(s)	3rd place, bronze medalist(s)	Total	Rank
(Malaysia) 1989 Kuala Lumpur	46	3	11	5	19	7th
(Philippines) 1991 Manila	100	7	12	10	29	7th
1993 Singapore	139	9	6	19	34	6th
(Thailand) 1995 Chiang Mai	180	10	18	24	52	6th
(Indonesia) 1997 Jakarta	340	35	48	50	133	5th
(Brunei) 1999 Bandar Seri Begawan	174	17	20	27	64	5th
(Malaysia) 2001 Kuala Lumpur	431	33	35	64	132	4th
(Vietnam) 2003 Hanoi - Ho Chi Minh City	752	158	97	91	346	1st
(Philippines) 2005 Manila	528	71	71	86	228	3rd
(Thailand) 2007 Nakhon Ratchasima	624	64	58	82	204	3rd
(Laos) 2009 Vientiane	671	83	75	57	215	2nd
(Indonesia) 2011 Jakarta and Palembang	608	96	92	100	288	3rd
(Myanmar) 2013 Nay Pyi Taw	511	74	85	86	245	3rd
2015 Singapore	391	73	53	60	186	3rd
(Malaysia) 2017 Kuala Lumpur	460	58	50	60	168	3rd
2019 Philippines	856	98	85	105	288	2nd
2021 Vietnam	965	205	125	116	446	1st
(Cambodia) 2023 Phnom Penh	702	136	105	114	355	1st
(Thailand) 2025 Bangkok & Chonburi	841	87	81	110	278	3rd
(Malaysia) 2027 Kuala Lumpur, Sarawak, Penang & Johor	future event					
2029 Singapore	future event					
2031 Laos	future event					
2033 Philippines	future event					
Total		1317	1127	1266	3710	1st

== Medals of South Vietnam (1959-1973) ==
All-time Medal Tally
Games	Athletes	1st place, gold medalist(s)	2nd place, silver medalist(s)	3rd place, bronze medalist(s)	Total	Rank
(Thailand) 1959 Bangkok	?	5	5	6	16	5th
(Myanmar) 1961 Rangoon	?	9	5	8	22	4th
(Malaysia) 1965 Kuala Lumpur	?	5	7	7	19	6th
(Thailand) 1967 Bangkok	?	6	10	17	33	5th
(Myanmar) 1969 Rangoon	?	9	5	8	22	4th
(Malaysia) 1971 Kuala Lumpur	?	3	6	9	18	6th
1973 Singapore	?	2	13	10	25	6th
Total		39	51	65	155	4th
