= Diving at the 2003 SEA Games =

The Diving competition at the 22nd SEA Games was held December 7–10, 2003 in My Dinh Aquatics Centre, Hanoi, Vietnam.

== Medalists ==
=== Men ===
| Event | Gold | Silver | Bronze |
|---|---|---|---|
| 3 m springboard | Suchart Pichi (THA) | Meerit Insawang (THA) | Zardo Domenios (PHI) |
| 10 m platform | Rexel Ryan Fabriga (PHI) | Zibeon Beleng (MAS) | Nor Aznizal Najib (MAS) |
| Synchronised 3 m springboard | Thailand (THA); Suchart Pichi; Meerit Insawang | Philippines (PHI); Jaime Asok; Niño Carog | Indonesia (IDN); Muhammad Nasrullah; Akhmad Sukran Jamjami |
| Synchronised 10 m platform | Philippines (PHI); Rexel Ryan Fabriga; Jaime Asok | Indonesia (IDN); Husaini Noor; Muhammad Nasrullah | Thailand (THA); Sareerapat Pimsamsee; Suchart Pichi |

=== Women ===
| Event | Gold | Silver | Bronze |
|---|---|---|---|
| 3 m springboard | Mai Thị Hải Yến (VIE) | Sheila Mae Pérez (PHI) | Leong Mun Yee (MAS) |
| 10 m platform | Leong Mun Yee (MAS) | Shenny Ratna Amelia (IDN) | Sukrutai Tommaoros (THA) |
| Synchronised 3 m springboard | Vietnam (VIE); Mai Thị Hải Yến; Hoàng Thanh Trà | Malaysia (MAS); Grace Junita; Leong Mun Yee | Philippines (PHI); Cesiel Domenios; Sheila Mae Pérez |
| Synchronised 10 m platform | Indonesia (IDN); Shenny Ratna Amelia; Herliani Sukmahati | Malaysia (MAS); Leong Mun Yee; Cheong Jun Hoong | Thailand (THA); Sukrutai Tommaoros; Chantrakulcholt |
