= Rexel Fabriga =

Filipino diver

Personal information
- Nationality: Filipino
- Born: October 2, 1985 (age 40) Zamboanga City, Philippines
- Height: 5 ft 3 in (160 cm)
- Weight: 130 lb (60 kg)

Sport
- Country: Philippines
- Sport: Diving
Medal record
Men's diving
Representing Philippines
Southeast Asian Games
Gold medal – first place	2003 Vietnam	10 m platform
Gold medal – first place	2003 Vietnam	10 m synchro
Gold medal – first place	2005 Philippines	10 m synchro
Gold medal – first place	2007 Thailand	10 m synchro
Silver medal – second place	2005 Philippines	10 m platform
Silver medal – second place	2007 Thailand	10 m platform
Silver medal – second place	2009 Laos	10 m synchro
Bronze medal – third place	2009 Laos	10 m platform

Rexel Ryan Fabriga is a competitive diver. He was born on October 2, 1985, in Zamboanga, Philippines, where he grew up.

== Career ==
Coached by Chinese diving guru Zhang Dehu, Ryan first made his mark in the international diving scene when he was a surprise finalist, finishing 5th in the Men's 10m platform event of the FINA Diving Grand Prix event held in Texas, US. This event had Olympic finalists and World medalists in the start order. He went on a roll and won 2 gold medals in the 2003 Southeast Asian Games held in Vietnam which made him the first Filipino diver to bring home gold medals in a major international event. In the 2005 Southeast Asian Games, he won the gold in synchronized 10m platform together with Kevin Kong and a silver in 10m individual platform. He again defended the 10m synchronized platform gold for the 3rd time with Jaime Asok in the 2007 Southeast Asian Games held in Thailand while settling for another silver for the Philippines in the 10m individual platform event.

Ryan qualified for the 2008 Beijing Summer Olympic Games and ranked 28th in the Men's Individual 10meter platform event.

In 2009, he competed in the 2009 Southeast Asian Games in Laos and took home a silver medal in the synchronized platform and a bronze medal in the synchronized platform event. Ryan was primed to compete in the 2010 Asian Games in Guangzhou, China but had to withdraw due to an injury sustained during a vehicular accident on their way to the Aquatics Center. After assessing his injuries and his preparations for a run at qualifying for the 2012 London Olympics, he soon semi-announced his retirement from active competition.
