= John Muray =

Indonesian sprinter

Personal information
- Full name: John Herman Muray
- Nationality: Indonesian
- Born: 6 June 1978 (age 48) Manokwari, Papua Barat (INA)

Sport
- Sport: Track and field
- Event: Sprinting
Medal record
Men's athletics
Representing Indonesia
Southeast Asian Games
Silver medal – second place	2005 Manila	200 m
Silver medal – second place	2007 Nakhon Ratchasima	4 x 100 m relay
Bronze medal – third place	2003 Hanoi	100 m
Bronze medal – third place	2003 Hanoi	200 m
Bronze medal – third place	2003 Hanoi	4 x 100 m relay
Bronze medal – third place	2007 Nakhon Ratchasima	200m

John Herman Muray (born 6 June 1978) is an Indonesian former sprinter. He competed in the men's 100 metres at the 2000 Summer Olympics.
