= Rene Herrera =

Filipino athletics competitor

Personal information
- Full name: Rene Gamarcha Herrera
- Nationality: Filipino
- Born: May 24, 1979 (age 47) Iloilo, Philippines
- Height: 5 ft 8 in (172 cm)
- Weight: 143 lb (65 kg)

Sport
- Country: Philippines
- Sport: Track and field
- Events: 3000m steeplechase Marathon
Medal record
Men's athletics
Representing Philippines
South East Asian Games
Gold medal – first place	2011 Palembang	Men's 3000 m steeplechase
Gold medal – first place	2009 Vientiane	Men's 3000 m steeplechase
Gold medal – first place	2007 Nakhon Ratchasima	Men's 3000 m steeplechase
Gold medal – first place	2005 Manila	Men's 3000 m steeplechase
Gold medal – first place	2003 Hanoi	Men's 3000 m steeplechase

Rene Gamarcha Herrera (born April 24, 1979) is a Filipino track and field athlete. In total he has won 5 gold medals at South East Asian games. Currently, Herrera is one of the newly appointed coaches of the Philippines national athletics team.

== Early life ==
Herrera was born and raised in Jordan, Guimaras. He is the son of Rodrigo Herrera, an establishment janitor, and Nenita, a former housekeeper. Herrera started running at high school although, for a time, he was primarily an amateur boxer, competing in that event until the age 17. He stopped boxing with a record of 20 fights and 5 loses. Subsequently, Herrera entered the annual Milo marathon that he won, enabling him to qualify for national competitions.

Herrera is a Philippine Navy seaman, 2nd class and has competed in Southeast Asian, Asian and Olympic Games.

== Career ==
=== 2012 Summer Olympics ===
In 2012 London Olympic Games, Herrera made his Olympics racing debut in the 5000 metres. He qualified for the Olympics after winning silver at the Hong Kong Intercity Athletics Championships and becoming a five time gold medalist for the Southeast Asian games.

He was the oldest competitor for the Philippines at the Olympics

On August 8, 2012, in Olympic stadium, Herrera finished in 41st place, in a time of 14:44.11, his personal's best in the 5000 metres. However, Herrera did not advance at heats to the finals.

== Achievements ==
Herrera competes in the 3000 meter Steeplechase and Marathon events.

=== Personal Bests ===
Event	Time	Location	Date
3000m Steeplechase	8:49.39	Bangkok, Thailand	28.04.2004
5000m run	14:44.11	London, United Kingdom	08.08.2012

=== Competition record ===
Year	Competition	Venue	Position	Event	Notes
2012	2012 Summer Olympics	London, United Kingdom	41st	5000 m	14:44.11 PB
2012	Hong Kong Intercity Athletics Championships	Hong Kong, China	2nd	5000 m	15:01.73
2011	South East Asian Games	Palembang, Indonesia	1st	3000 m steeplechase	8:52.23
2011	Asian championships	Kobe, Japan	8th	3000 m steeplechase	9:12.34
2010	Asian Games	Guangzhou, China	8th	3000 m steeplechase	9:02.93
2010	Malaysian Open	Kuala Lumpur, Malaysia	1st	3000 m steeplechase	9:00.53
2009	South East Asian Games	Vientiane, Myanmar	1st	3000 m steeplechase	9:11.20
2008	Ho Chi Minh Int'l	Ho Chi Minh City, Vietnam		3000 m steeplechase [Gold]	9:00.01
2008	Inchon international half marathon	Inchon, Korea	8th	Half-Marathon	1:05:59 PB
2007	South East Asian Games	Nakhon Ratchasima (Korat), Thailand	1st	3000 m steeplechase	8:54:21
2006	Asian Games	Doha, Qatar	6th	3000 m steeplechase	9:05.70
2006	Philippine Olympic Festival	Palayan City, Philippines	1st	3000 m steeplechase	8:58.9
2005	South East Asian Games	Manila, Philippines	1st	3000 m steeplechase	8:56:14
2005	World Cross Country Championships	Saint-Galmier, France	128	Men's Short cross	13:42
2004	World Half Marathon Championships	New Delhi, India	73rd	Half marathon	1:15:06
2003	South East Asian Games	Hanoi, Vietnam	1st	3000 m steeplechase	8:50.78

Notes:

- NR - National Record
- PB - Personals best
- NR - National Record
- SB - Seasonal Best

== See also ==
- SEA Games
- Steeplechase (athletics)
