= Hamkah Afik =

Singaporean sprinter

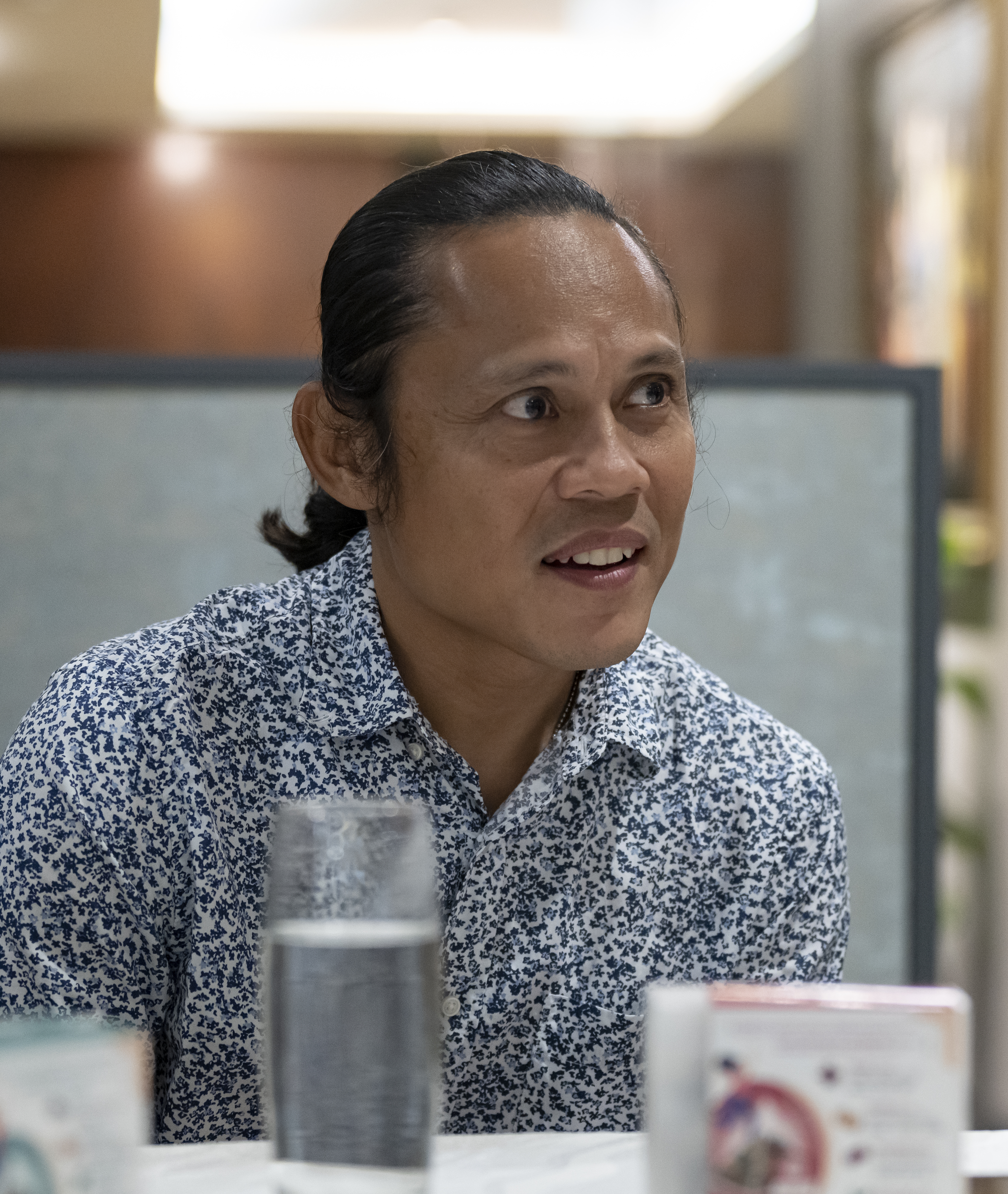

Personal information
- Born: 1972 (age 53–54) Singapore

Sport
- Country: Singapore
- Sport: Athletics
- Events: 100 metres, 200 metres, 4 × 100 metres relay
Medal record
Men's Athletics
Representing Singapore
Southeast Asian Games
Silver medal – second place	1993 Singapore	200 metres
Bronze medal – third place	1993 Singapore	4 × 100 m
Bronze medal – third place	1997 Jakarta	4 × 100 m
Silver medal – second place	2003 Hanoi	4 × 100 m

Hamkah bin Mohamed Afik is a former Singapore sprinter who competed in the Southeast Asian Games, Asian Games, and Commonwealth Games. He made his international debut at the 1989 Southeast Asian Games in Malaysia at the age of 17. In the 1993 Southeast Asian Games in Singapore, he won the silver medal in the 200 m. He was also part of the team that won bronze in the men's 4 × 100 m relay team in the same games, repeating the feat at the 1997 Southeast Asian Games in Indonesia. In the 2003 Southeast Asian Games in Vietnam, he was part of the men's 4 × 100 m relay team that won silver.

After hanging up his spikes, Hamkah took on coaching. He was national relay coach for Singapore from 2006 to 2010, a role he assumed again between 2017 and 2019; the 2009 men's 4 × 100 m team took silver at the Southeast Asian Games, becoming the first Singapore team to clock below 40s. He is coach of Mark Lee, who at the 2022 National Schools Track & Field Championships broke the A Division records for the 200m and 100m.

Hamkah's daughter, Haanee Afik, participated in the 2019 Southeast Asian Games in Manila as part of the women's 4 × 100 m relay team.
