= Meerit Insawang =

Thai diver

Personal information
- Nationality: Thai
- Born: 5 September 1983 (age 41)

Sport
- Sport: Diving

Meerit Insawang (born 5 September 1983) is a Thai diver. He competed in the men's 3 metre springboard event at the 2000 Summer Olympics.
