= Malaysia at the 2003 SEA Games =

Malaysia at the 2003 Southeast Asian Games
- IOC code: MAS
- NOC: Olympic Council of Malaysia
- Website: www.olympic.org.my (in English)

in Vietnam
- Competitors: 351 in 24 sports
- Medals Ranked 5th: Gold 43 Silver 42 Bronze 59 Total 144

Southeast Asian Games appearances (overview)
- 1959; 1961; 1965; 1967; 1969; 1971; 1973; 1975; 1977; 1979; 1981; 1983; 1985; 1987; 1989; 1991; 1993; 1995; 1997; 1999; 2001; 2003; 2005; 2007; 2009; 2011; 2013; 2015; 2017; 2019; 2021; 2023; 2025; 2027; 2029

Malaysia competed in the 2003 Southeast Asian Games held in Hanoi and Ho Chi Minh City, Vietnam from 5 to 13 December 2003.

== Medal summary ==
=== Medals by sport ===
Sport	Gold	Silver	Bronze	Total	Rank
Archery	2	2	0	4	1
Athletics	8	2	6	16	4
Badminton	2	2	4	8	2
Basketball	1	0	1	2	1
Billiards and snooker	0	3	0	3	
Bodybuilding	1	0	1	2	
Boxing	0	0	1	1	
Chess	0	0	3	3	
Cycling	1	0	0	1	
Diving	1	3	2	6	4
Football	0	0	1	1	4
Gymnastics	9	8	4	21	1
Judo	0	0	1	1	
Karate	2	7	8	17	
Pencak silat	2	2	3	9	
Pétanque	0	0	2	2	
Sepak takraw	0	2	0	2	
Shooting	3	3	4	10	
Swimming	8	8	6	22	
Table tennis	0	0	1	1	6
Taekwondo	1	3	2	6	
Weightlifting	2	0	2	4	4
Wushu	2	1	5	8	
Total	43	42	59	144	5

=== Medallists ===
Medal	Name	Sport	Event	Date
Gold	Muhammad Marbawi Sulaiman	Archery	Men's individual recurve	6 Dec
Gold	Muhammad Marbawi Sulaiman	Archery	Men's team recurve	6 Dec
Gold	Nazmizan Mohamed	Athletics	Men's 100 metres	7 Dec
Gold	Nazmizan Mohamed	Athletics	Men's 200 metres	
Gold	Mohd Sharrulhaizy Abdul Rahman	Athletics	Men's 20 kilometres walk	
Gold	Loo Kum Zee	Athletics	Men's high jump	8 Dec
Gold	Mohd Shahrul Amri Suhaimi	Athletics	Men's long jump	
Gold	Mohd Malik Ahmad Tobias	Athletics	Men's decathlon	
Gold	Noraseela Mohd Khalid	Athletics	Women's 400 metres hurdles	
Gold	Yuan Yufang	Athletics	Women's 20 kilometres walk	
Gold	Wong Mew Choo	Badminton	Women's singles	
Gold	Choong Tan Fook; Lee Wan Wah	Badminton	Men's doubles	
Gold	Malaysia national basketball team	Basketball	Women's tournament	
Gold	Sazali Samad	Bodybuilding	Men's bantamweight (65 kg)	6 Dec
Gold	Leong Mun Yee	Diving	Women's 10 metre platform	8 Dec
Gold	Ng Shu Wai	Gymnastics	Men's artistic individual all-around	6 Dec
Gold	Ng Shu Wai	Gymnastics	Men's floor	8 Dec
Gold	Onn Kwang Tung	Gymnastics	Men's pommel horse	8 Dec
Gold	Nurul Fatiha Abdul Hamid	Gymnastics	Women's artistic individual all-around	6 Dec
Gold	Nurul Fatiha Abdul Hamid	Gymnastics	Women's balance beam	8 Dec
Gold	Durratun Nasihin Rosli; Foong Seow Ting; Lim Wen Chean; See Hui Yee	Gymnastics	Women's rhythmic team all-around	
Gold	Durratun Nasihin Rosli	Gymnastics	Women's rhythmic individual all-around	
Gold	Durratun Nasihin Rosli	Gymnastics	Women's rhythmic hoop	
Gold	Durratun Nasihin Rosli	Gymnastics	Women's rhythmic clubs	
Gold	S. Mahendran	Karate	Men's individual kumite openweight	8 Dec
Gold	S. Premila	Karate	Women's individual kumite openweight	8 Dec
Gold	Allen Ong	Swimming	Men's 100 metre freestyle	
Gold	Alex Lim Keng Liat	Swimming	Men's 100 metre backstroke	8 Dec
Gold	Alex Lim Keng Liat	Swimming	Men's 200 metre backstroke	6 Dec
Gold	Alex Lim Keng Liat	Swimming	Men's 100 metre butterfly	8 Dec
Gold	Alex Lim Keng Liat; Allen Ong; Daniel Bego; Saw Yi Khy	Swimming	Men's 4 × 200 metre freestyle relay	6 Dec
Gold	Amirul Hamizan Ibrahim	Weightlifting	Men's 56 kg	
Gold	Che Mohd Azrul Che Mat	Weightlifting	Men's +94 kg	
Silver		Archery	Women's team recurve	
Silver	Mon Redee Sut Txi	Archery	Women's individual recurve	
Silver	Mohd Robani Hassan	Athletics	Men's 110 metres hurdles	8 Dec
Silver	Ahmad Najwan Aqra	Athletics	Men's high jump	8 Dec
Silver	Wong Choong Hann	Badminton	Men's singles	
Silver	Chang Kim Wai; Chew Choon Eng	Badminton	Men's doubles	
Silver	Lee Poh Soon; Moh Keen Hoo	Billiards and snooker	Men's snooker doubles	6 Dec
Silver		Billiards and snooker	Men's snooker team	8 Dec
Silver	Grace Junita; Leong Mun Yee	Diving	Women's synchronised 3 metre springboard	
Silver	Cheong Jun Hoong; Leong Mun Yee	Diving	Women's synchronised 10 metre platform	
Silver	Heng Wah Mai; Loke Yik Siang; Ng Shu Mun; Ng Shu Wai; Onn Kwang Tung; Ooi Wei Siang	Gymnastics	Men's artistic team all-around	
Silver	Loke Yik Siang	Gymnastics	Men's floor	8 Dec
Silver	Ng Shu Wai	Gymnastics	Men's vault	8 Dec
Silver	Ooi Wei Siang	Gymnastics	Men's horizontal bar	8 Dec
Silver	Foong Seow Ting	Gymnastics	Women's rhythmic individual all-around	
Silver	Durratun Nasihin Rosli	Gymnastics	Women's rhythmic ball	
Silver	Lim Wen Chean	Gymnastics	Women's rhythmic clubs	
Silver	Lim Wen Chean	Gymnastics	Women's rhythmic rope	
Silver		Karate	Men's team kata	6 Dec
Silver		Karate	Women's team kata	6 Dec
Silver	Puvaneswaran Ramasamy	Karate	Men's individual kumite 55 kg	8 Dec
Silver	Nur Suryani Taibi	Shooting	Women's 50 metre rifle prone	6 Dec
Silver	Allen Ong	Swimming	Men's 50 metre freestyle	
Silver	Daniel Bego	Swimming	Men's 100 metre freestyle	
Silver	Allen Ong; Alex Lim Keng Liat; Daniel Bego; Ludrey Lim	Swimming	Men's 4 × 100 metre freestyle relay	8 Dec
Bronze	Mohd Hazuan Zainal Abidin	Athletics	Men's long jump	
Bronze	Tee Kui Wong	Athletics	Men's hammer throw	
Bronze	Moh Siew Wei	Athletics	Women's 100 metres hurdles	
Bronze	Roslinda Samsu	Athletics	Women's pole vault	
Bronze	Ngew Sin Mei	Athletics	Women's triple jump	7 Dec
Bronze	Siti Shahida Abdullah	Athletics	Women's hammer throw	
Bronze	Roslin Hashim	Badminton	Men's singles	
Bronze	Chin Eei Hui; Wong Pei Tty	Badminton	Women's doubles	
Bronze	Chew Choon Eng; Chin Eei Hui	Badminton	Mixed doubles	
Bronze	Malaysia national badminton team: Chang Kim Wai; Chew Choon Eng; Choong Tan Fook; Lee Chong Wei; Lee Wan Wah; Roslin Hashim; Wong Choong Hann	Badminton	Men's team	
Bronze	Malaysia national basketball team	Basketball	Men's tournament	
Bronze	Othman Yahya	Bodybuilding	Men's middleweight (85 kg)	6 Dec
Bronze	Siti Zulaikha Muhmad Foudzi	Chess	Women's singles	6 Dec
Bronze	Malaysia national under-23 football team: Akmal Rizal Ahmad Rakhli; Indra Putra Mahayuddin; K. Rajan; Juzaili Samion; Mohd Syamsuri Mustafa; Yosri Derma Raju; Zainizam Marjan; Ronny Harun; Mohd Amri Yahyah; Abdul Aziz Ismail; Shahril Shariffuddin; Mohd Harris Kamal; Norhissham Hassan; Surendren Rasiah; Zainizam Marjan	Football	Men's tournament	
Bronze	Leong Mun Yee	Diving	Women's 3 metre springboard	7 Dec
Bronze	Yap Yee Yin	Gymnastics	Women's balance beam	8 Dec
Bronze	See Hui Yee	Gymnastics	Women's rhythmic hoop	
Bronze	Foong Seow Ting	Gymnastics	Women's rhythmic ball	
Bronze	Durratun Nasihin Rosli	Gymnastics	Women's rhythmic rope	
Bronze	A. Arlanthu	Karate	Men's individual kumite 70 kg	6 Dec
Bronze	Vasantha Marial Anthony	Karate	Women's individual kumite 48 kg	6 Dec
Bronze	S. Sasitharan	Karate	Men's individual kumite 60 kg	8 Dec
Bronze		Karate	Women's team kumite	6 Dec
Bronze	Daniel Bego	Swimming	Men's 200 metre freestyle	
Bronze	Saw Yi Khy	Swimming	Men's 1500 metre freestyle	
Bronze	Khoo Cai Lin	Swimming	Women's 800 metre freestyle	
Bronze	Beh Lee Wei	Table tennis	Women's singles	12 Dec
Bronze		Tennis	Men's team	6 Dec
Bronze	Muhamad Hidayat Hamidon	Weightlifting	Men's 77 kg	
Bronze	Edmund Yeo Thien Chuan	Weightlifting	Men's 94 kg	

== Aquatics ==
=== Diving ===
Men

Athlete	Event	Preliminary		Final	
Athlete	Event	Score	Rank	Score	Rank
Nor Aznizal Najib	10 m platform	—N/a			3rd place, bronze medalist(s)
Zibeon Beleng	10 m platform	—N/a			2nd place, silver medalist(s)

Women

Athlete	Event	Preliminary		Final	
Athlete	Event	Score	Rank	Score	Rank
Leong Mun Yee	3 m springboard	—N/a			3rd place, bronze medalist(s)
Leong Mun Yee	10 m platform	—N/a			1st place, gold medalist(s)
Grace Junita; Leong Mun Yee	3 m synchronized springboard	—N/a			2nd place, silver medalist(s)
Cheong Jun Hoong; Leong Mun Yee	10 m synchronized platform	—N/a			2nd place, silver medalist(s)

=== Swimming ===
Men

Athlete	Event	Heats		Final	
Athlete	Event	Time	Overall rank	Time	Rank
Allen Ong	50 m freestyle			23.69	2nd place, silver medalist(s)
Allen Ong	100 m freestyle			51.57	1st place, gold medalist(s)
Daniel Bego	200 m freestyle			1:55.36	3rd place, bronze medalist(s)
Saw Yi Khy	1500 m freestyle	—N/a			3rd place, bronze medalist(s)
Alex Lim	100 m backstroke			57.51	1st place, gold medalist(s)
Alex Lim	200 m backstroke			2:04.11	1st place, gold medalist(s)

== Football ==
=== Men's tournament ===
Group B

Team	Pld	W	D	L	GF	GA	GD	Pts
Malaysia	3	3	0	0	13	3	+10	9
Myanmar	3	2	0	1	10	3	+7	6
Singapore	3	1	0	2	5	5	0	3
Cambodia	3	0	0	3	2	19	−17	0

29 November 2003
15:00

Malaysia	8 – 1	Cambodia
Raju 16'; Mahayuddin 45'; Rakhli 49', 51', 80'; Samion 58'; K. Rajan 68', 76'	Report	Kanyanith 86'

Thống Nhất Stadium, Ho Chi Minh City
Attendance: 10,000
Referee: Dương Văn Hiền (Vietnam)

3 December 2003
15:00

Singapore	0 – 2	Malaysia
	Report	K. Rajan 58'; Rakhli 83'

Thống Nhất Stadium, Ho Chi Minh City

6 December 2003
15:00

Myanmar	2 – 3	Malaysia
Kyaw Thu Ra 69'; Soe Myat Min 89'	Report	Rakhli 35'; Samion 72'; Mahayuddin 77'

Thống Nhất Stadium, Ho Chi Minh City

Semifinal

9 December 2003
19:00

Vietnam	4 – 3	Malaysia
Lê Quốc Vượng 26'; Phạm Văn Quyến 50', 79'; Phan Thanh Bình 90'	Report	Mustafa 73'; Marjan 85'; Mahayuddin 87'

Mỹ Đình National Stadium, Hanoi

Bronze medal match

12 December 2003
16:30

Malaysia	1 – 1 (a.e.t.)	Myanmar
Rakhli 50'	Report	Khin Maung Tun 8'
Penalties
Raju (penalty scored); Kamad (penalty scored); Mahayuddin (penalty scored); Rakhli (penalty scored)	4 – 2	(penalty scored) Min; (penalty missed) TBD; (penalty missed) TBD; (penalty scored) Moe

Mỹ Đình National Stadium, Hanoi

=== Women's tournament ===
Group A

Team	Pld	W	D	L	GF	GA	GD	Pts
Vietnam	3	3	0	0	12	1	+11	9
Malaysia	3	0	2	1	3	5	−2	2
Philippines	3	0	2	1	1	4	−3	2
Indonesia	3	0	2	1	3	9	−6	2

2 December 2003

Philippines	0 – 0	Malaysia

Lạch Tray Stadium, Hai Phong

4 December 2003

Malaysia	1 – 3	Vietnam
Norlelawati Ngah 77'		Văn Thị Thanh 55'; Đoàn Thị Kim Chi 59'; Nguyễn Thị Mai Lan 65'

Lạch Tray Stadium, Hai Phong

6 December 2003

Indonesia	2 – 2	Malaysia
Marion Pakage 7'; Jenny Merlin Yansip 37'		Laini Ahing 45'; Norlelawati Ngah 48'

Lạch Tray Stadium, Hai Phong

Semifinal

8 December 2003

Myanmar	8 – 0	Malaysia
San San Kyu 19', 24'; Zin Mar Wann 28', 41'; Aye Nandar Hlaing 34'; Nwe Nwe Toe 36'; Than Than Htwe 55'; Nhin Si Miynt 72'

Lạch Tray Stadium, Hai Phong

Bronze medal match

11 December 2003

Thailand	6 – 1	Malaysia
Chownee Phanlet 4', 21', 42', 50'; Narumon Piamsin 7', 25'		Norlelawati Ngah 29'

Lạch Tray Stadium, Hai Phong
