= Sheila Mae Perez =

Filipino diver

Personal information
- Nationality: Filipino
- Born: December 10, 1985 (age 40) Davao City, Philippines
- Height: 5 ft 1 in (156 cm)
- Weight: 119 lb (54 kg)

Sport
- Sport: Diving
Medal record
Representing Philippines
Southeast Asian Games
Gold medal – first place	2005 Philippines	3m springboard
Gold medal – first place	2005 Philippines	3m springboard synchro
Gold medal – first place	2005 Philippines	1m springboard
Gold medal – first place	2007 Nakhon Ratchasima	3m springboard
Silver medal – second place	2007 Nakhon Ratchasima	1m springboard
Silver medal – second place	2009 Vientiane	3m springboard
Bronze medal – third place	2011 Indonesia	3m springboard synchro

Sheila Mae Perez (born December 10, 1985) is a Filipino Olympic diver. Reuters describes her as "one of the best divers in Southeast Asia".

Perez was brought up in a poor family in Davao City. She reportedly "helped her poverty-stricken parents make ends meet by diving from cargo ships to retrieve scrap metal".

She represented her country at the 2000 Summer Olympics in Sydney, finishing 32nd out of 56. She qualified to take part in the 2004 Summer Olympics in Athens, but was reportedly "unable to compete". She represented the Philippines at the 2008 Summer Olympics at Beijing for the second time.

Perez won two medals at the 2003 Southeast Asian Games, and three gold medals at the 2005 Southeast Asian Games, in the 3-metre springboard, synchronised 3-metre springboard and 1-metre springboard events, becoming the first ever triple-gold medallist from the Philippines at the Games. She won a gold and a silver in the 2007 Southeast Asian Games, not having competed in the synchronised event due to her partner Ceseil Domenios, sister of another Filipino diver Zardo Domenios, having retired.

In 2006, her life story was dramatised in an episode of Maalaala Mo Kaya, directed by Cathy Garcia-Molina.

During the previous years, she had been planning to retire after the 2011 Southeast Asian Games. After the 2008 Summer Olympics, she reneged her plan and changed it to after the 2012 Summer Olympics. In addition, she said she wants to be part of the RP national diving coaching staff after her retirement. Still, she said her sister whose name is Blissa will replace her as one of the next female Filipino divers to represent the Philippines at international diving competitions. Blissa is currently under the developmental pool.
