= Jason Goh =

Singaporean chess player (born 1989)

Jason Goh Koon-Jong
Personal information
- Born: 18 December 1989 (age 36) Singapore

Chess career
- Country: Singapore
- Title: International Master (2004)
- FIDE rating: 2408 (July 2026)
- Peak rating: 2428 (July 2005)

Jason Goh Koon-Jong (born 18 December 1989) is a Singapore chess International Master. He won the national Singaporean Chess Championship in 2004. Represented Singapore three times in Chess Olympiads (2004, 2006, 2008). His most recent FIDE rating is 2408 in April 2015.
