= Lê Kiều Thiên Kim =

Vietnamese chess player (born 1981)

Personal information
- Born: 10 December 1981 (age 44)

Chess career
- Country: Vietnam
- Title: Woman International Master (2001)
- FIDE rating: 2152 (May 2021)
- Peak rating: 2341 (January 2004)

Lê Kiều Thiên Kim (born 10 December 1981) is a Vietnamese chess player and FIDE Woman International Master. She won the Vietnamese Women's Chess Championship in 2002.

== Biography ==
In 2002, Kim won the Vietnamese Women's Chess Championship, but in 2006, she won silver medal in Vietnamese Women's Chess Championship. In 2011, Lê Kiều Thiên Kim won 3rd place in ASEAN Women's Chess Championship. In 2004, Lê Kiều Thiên Kim participated in Women's World Chess Championship by knock-out system and in the first round lost to Hoang Thanh Trang.

Kim played for Vietnam:

- in Women's Chess Olympiad participated 6 times 1998–2004, 2008, 2012);
- in Women's World Team Chess Championship participated in 2007;
- in Women's Asian Team Chess Championship participated 2 times (2003, 2008) and won team silver (2003) and bronze (2008) medals, as well as won individual gold (2003) medal;
- in Asian Indoor Games participated in 2007 and won team bronze medal.

In 2001, she was awarded the FIDE Woman International Master (WIM) title.
