= Rinnai =

Japanese multinational home appliance manufacturing company

Rinnai Corporation
- Logo used since 2019
- Native name: リンナイ株式会社
- Type: Public (K.K)
- Traded as: TYO: 5947; NSE: 4949
- ISIN: JP3977400005
- Industry: Home appliance
- Founded: 1 September 1920; 106 years ago
- Founders: Hidejiro Naito; Kanekichi Hayashi
- Headquarters: Nakagawa-ku, Nagoya, 454-0802, Japan
- Area served: Worldwide
- Key people: Kaden Hayashi (Chairman); Hiroyasu Naito (President and Executive President)
- Products: Water heaters; Furnaces; Gas appliances
- Revenue: ▲JPY 347 billion (FY 2017) (US$ 3.2 billion) (FY 2017)
- Net income: ▲JPY 21 billion (FY 2017) (US$ 200 million) (FY 2017)
- Number of employees: 10,571 (consolidated, as of March 31, 2018)
- Website: www.rinnai.com

Rinnai Corporation is a Japanese multinational company based in Nagoya, Japan, that manufactures gas appliances, including energy-efficient tankless water heaters, home heating appliances, kitchen appliances, gas clothes dryers and commercial-use equipment such as rice cookers, grillers, fryers and salamanders.

Rinnai is Japan’s largest manufacturer of gas kitchen appliances.

== History ==
=== Formation and early years (1920–1970) ===
Formally known as Rinnai & Co., the company was co-founded by Kanekichi Hayashi and Hidejiro Naito. The origin of the business started in November 1918, stemming from Hidejiro’s inspiration from the blue flames emitted from an imported oil-burning imagawayaki cooking stove. Using the particular stove as a model, Hidejiro subsequently developed a petroleum-fuelled stove.

In 1920, Hidejiro left his job at Nagoya Gas (currently Toho Gas Co., Ltd.) and established Rinnai & Co. together with Kanekichi, a childhood friend who lived in the same dormitory. The company name was coined from characters in the two founder's last names – “Rin” (it’s another way of reading “Hayashi“) and “Nai” (from “Naito“). In 1971, Rinnai & Co. changed their name to Rinnai Corporation.

Rinnai began with manufacturing and selling gas appliances such as gas table top stoves, gas ovens and gas water heaters. From 1938 to 1946, the company paused their gas appliances production to manufacture aircraft parts for the army for war effort. The production resumed in 1946 after the head office factory was rebuilt.

By the 1950s, Rinnai changed to a limited company and opened up their Tokyo office. From then onwards, Rinnai expanded rapidly by opening up more subsidiaries and factories around the country and increasing the business line-up to produce more gas-related appliances. Today, Rinnai has 15 domestic subsidiaries and manufacturing companies in Japan.

=== Global expansion (1971–present) ===
In the 1970's, Rinnai established 10 new subsidiaries across countries such as Australia (1971), Malaysia (1973), Korea (1974), North America (1974), New Zealand (1975), Brazil (1975) and the United Kingdom (1976).

As of 2018, Rinnai has over 20 overseas subsidiaries and manufacturing companies in more countries such as Canada, China, Hong Kong, Indonesia, Italy, Singapore, Taiwan, Thailand and Vietnam.

As of 2022, Rinnai has a state of the art manufacturing facility in Griffin, Georgia.

== Subsidiary ==
=== North America ===
Rinnai America Corporation was founded in 1974. Headquartered in Peachtree City, Georgia, the North American subsidiary of Rinnai Corporation has a satellite office in Nevada.

=== Malaysia ===
Rinnai (M) Sdn. Bhd. (Rinnai Malaysia) was founded in 1973 and is headquartered in Petaling Jaya, Selangor.

The product range of Rinnai Malaysia are mainly home kitchen appliances, including cooker hoods, built-in hobs, table-top stoves, built-in ovens and microwave ovens, BBQ set, and a kitchen sinks and faucets collaboration with Suprema from Australia. Rinnai also sell gas and electric instant water heaters, gas clothes dryer and gas commercial-use cooking appliances, such as stoves and range cookers, rice cookers, grillers, and infrared burners.

Rinnai Malaysia developed the first generation Electric Instant Water Heater, Ore Series. Soon after, Rinnai Malaysia developed the second generation, Crystal Series. Both series are also distributed to several South East Asia subsidiaries to be sold in their respective countries.
