= Fencing at the 2003 SEA Games =

Fencing at the 22nd SEA Games was held in Cau Giay Gymnasium, Hanoi, Vietnam.

== Medal summary ==
=== Men's events ===
Event	Gold	Silver	Bronze
Individual épée	Siriroj Rattaprasert (THA)	Vizcayno Macario (PHI)	Muhammad Haerullah (IDN)
Individual épée	Siriroj Rattaprasert (THA)	Vizcayno Macario (PHI)	Ang Chez Yee (SIN)
Team épée	Philippines (PHI)	Thailand (THA)	Vietnam (VIE)
Individual sabre	Mendoza Gumabao (PHI)	Wiradech Kothny (THA)	Nguyễn Văn Quế (VIE)
Individual sabre	Mendoza Gumabao (PHI)	Wiradech Kothny (THA)	Dương Văn Cường (VIE)
Team sabre	Vietnam (VIE)	Philippines (PHI)	Thailand (THA)
Individual foil	Nontapat Panchan (THA)	Nguyễn Hải Đăng (VIE)	Dadan Heri (IDN)
Individual foil	Nontapat Panchan (THA)	Nguyễn Hải Đăng (VIE)	Li Chien Koh (SIN)
Team foil	Philippines (PHI)	Vietnam (VIE)	Singapore (SIN)

=== Women's events ===
Event	Gold	Silver	Bronze
Individual épée	Siritida Choochokkul (THA)	Nguyễn Thị Như Hà (VIE)	Isnawati Sir Idar (IDN)
Individual épée	Siritida Choochokkul (THA)	Nguyễn Thị Như Hà (VIE)	Rina Sucipto (IDN)
Individual sabre	Nguyễn Thị Lệ Dung (VIE)	Nguyễn Thị Thủy Chung (VIE)	Joanna Villareal (PHI)
Individual sabre	Nguyễn Thị Lệ Dung (VIE)	Nguyễn Thị Thủy Chung (VIE)	Supanna Samaboot (THA)
Team sabre			
Individual foil	Lenita Garcia (PHI)	Veena Nuestro (PHI)	Ng Yi Lin (SIN)
Individual foil	Lenita Garcia (PHI)	Veena Nuestro (PHI)	Nunta Chantasuwannansin (THA)
