= Weightlifting at the 2003 SEA Games =

- Venue: Soc Son Gymnasium
- Location: Hanoi, Vietnam

Weightlifting at the 2003 Southeast Asian Games was held in the Soc Son Gymnasium, Hanoi, Vietnam.

== Events ==
13 sets of medals were awarded in the following events:

- 56 kg Men
- 62 kg Men
- 69 kg Men
- 77 kg Men
- 85 kg Men
- 94 kg Men
- +94 kg Men

- 48 kg Women
- 53 kg Women
- 58 kg Women
- 63 kg Women
- 69 kg Women
- 75 kg Women

== Medal summary ==
=== Medal table ===
Rank	Nation	Gold	Silver	Bronze	Total
1	Thailand (THA)	4	4	0	8
2	Myanmar (MYA)	4	2	2	8
3	Indonesia (INA)	3	2	3	8
4	Malaysia (MAS)	2	0	2	4
5	Vietnam (VIE)	0	5	1	6
6	Philippines (PHI)	0	0	1	1
Totals (6 entries)		13	13	9	35

=== Men's events ===
Event	Gold	Silver	Bronze
56 kg	Amirul Hamizan Ibrahim (MAS)	Marobi Chehtae (THA)	Hoàng Anh Tuấn (VIE)
62 kg	Chom Singnoi (THA)	Nguyễn Mạnh Thắng (VIE)	Myint Kyi (MYA)
69 kg	Mesdan Yunip (IDN)	Aung Aung Htoo (MYA)	
77 kg	Erwin Abdullah (IDN)	Sulti Yonjaitan (THA)	Muhamad Hidayat Hamidon (MAS)
85 kg	Yudi Suhartono (IDN)	Nguyễn Quốc Thành (VIE)	
94 kg	Narongsak Panyaake (THA)	Tarso (IDN)	Edmund Yeo Thien Chuan (MAS)
+94 kg	Che Mohd Azrul Che Mat (MAS)	Niti Khameiam (THA)	Alvin Delos Santos (PHI)

=== Women's events ===
Event	Gold	Silver	Bronze
48 kg	Kay Thi Win (MYA)	Aree Wiratthaworn (THA)	Rosmainar (IDN)
53 kg	Udomporn Polsak (THA)	Swe Swe Win (MYA)	Raema Lisa Rumbewas (IDN)
58 kg	Junpim Kuntatean (THA)	Patmawati (IDN)	Shwe Sin Win (MYA)
63 kg	Khin Moe New (MYA)	Nguyễn Thị Thiết (VIE)	Tanti Pratiwi (IDN)
69 kg	Mya Sanda Co (MYA)	Khuất Minh Hải (VIE)	
75 kg	Cho Cho Win (MYA)	Nguyễn Thị Phương Loan (VIE)	
