= Jayson Gonzales =

Filipino chess grandmaster (born 1969)

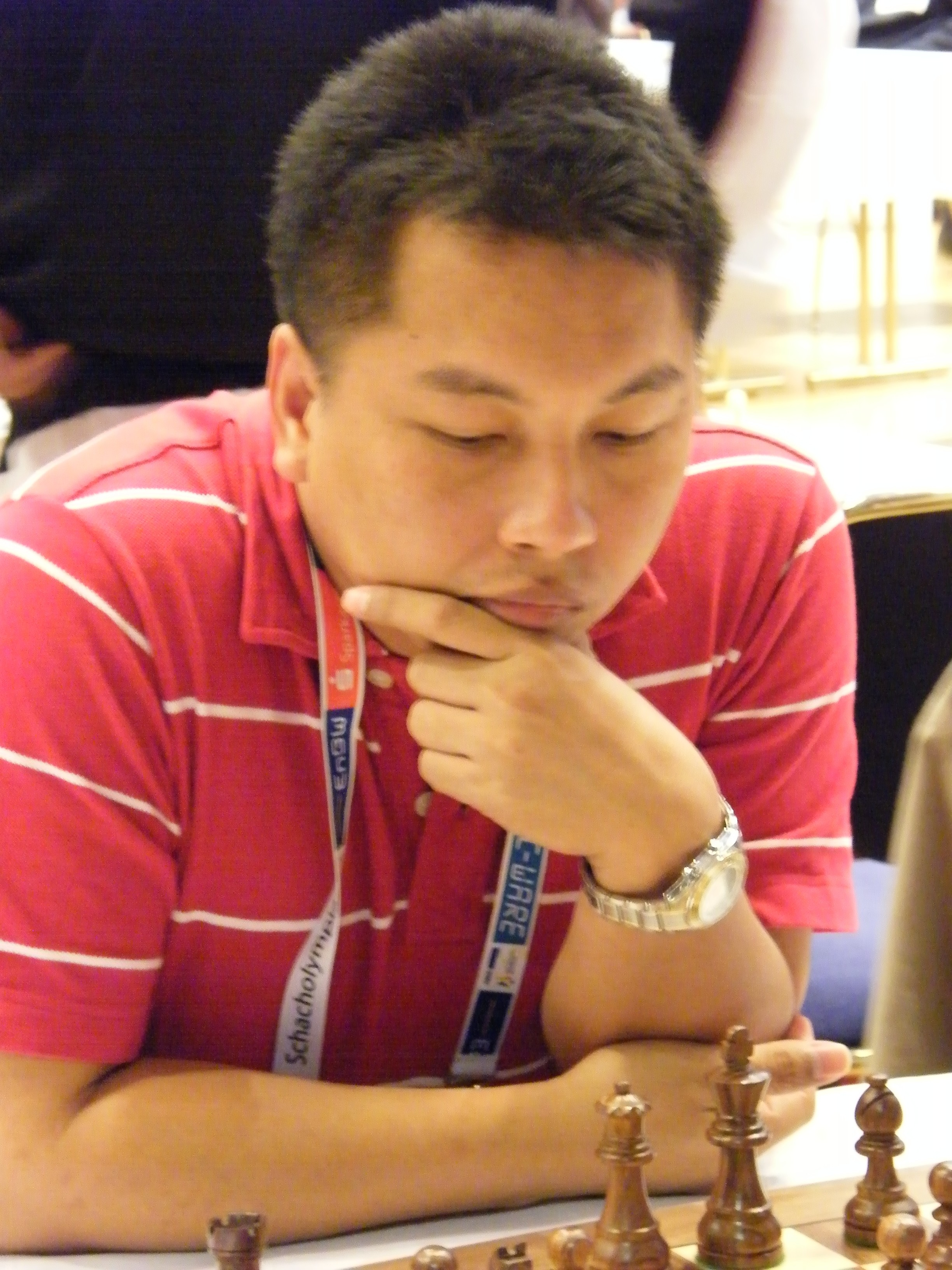
- Gonzales at the Dresden Olympiad, 2008

Personal information
- Born: May 2, 1969 (age 57) Quezon City, Philippines

Chess career
- Country: Philippines
- Title: Grandmaster (2008)
- Peak rating: 2524 (July 2008)

Jayson Gonzales (born May 2, 1969 in Quezon City) is a Filipino chess grandmaster (2008).

== Chess career ==
He played for the Philippines in the Chess Olympiads of 2004 and 2008. In 1998, he won the Southern California Open. In 2001, he tied for 4–5th with Alan Sayson in the Philippine Chess Championship. In 2004, tied for 3rd–4th with Sergei Tiviakov in the Calvia Open and came third behind Jaan Ehlvest and John Fedorowicz in the 88th Marshall Chess Club Championship in New York. In 2008, he tied for 2nd–3rd with Ashot Nadanian in the 1st Leg ASEAN Circuit Chess Tournament in Tarakan and came second in the 1st Subic International Open Tournament.

On the May 2012 FIDE list, he has an Elo rating of 2405. His handle on the Internet Chess Club is "veracity".

Along with Eugene Torre, Gonzales established the Philippine Academy for Chess Excellence in 2010.

== Personal life ==
In August 2022, Gonzales suffered from a heart attack.
