= Mark Paragua =

Filipino chess grandmaster (born 1984)

Personal information
- Born: Mark Callano Paragua; March 29, 1984 (age 42) Manila, Philippines

Chess career
- Country: Philippines
- Title: Grandmaster (2005)
- FIDE rating: 2403 (July 2026)
- Peak rating: 2621 (April 2006)
- Peak ranking: No. 99 (April 2006)

Mark Callano Paragua (born March 29, 1984) is a Filipino chess grandmaster. He won the Philippine Chess Championship in 2012. He was the youngest Filipino master ever, at nine years of age. He also became the youngest Filipino GM ever at 20 (until Wesley So surpassed it), beating Eugenio Torre's record by about two years.

== Chess career ==
At the 1998 Disney World Rapid Chess Championship for Kids, Paragua tied for finished first with 7½ points in the boys' 14-and-under section, and took the gold medal on tiebreak points.

Paragua also played in the 3rd Asian Indoor Games held in 2009 where he finished with 5 wins, 1 draw, and 2 losses with a Tournament Performance Rating (TPR) of 2522 (ELO 2501) leading the team to a 7th-place finish but missed out on a playoff berth.

=== World Youth Chess Championship ===
Paragua took part in two World Youth Chess Championships:

- 15th World Youth Chess Championship (2001) where he tied for 17th-26th places in the tournament that attracted 83 players in the premier Boys U-18. He eventually placed 17th after tie-breaks scoring 6.5 points.
- 16th World Youth Chess Championship (2002) where he tied for 3rd-5th places, ultimately ending up in 5th place in the Boys U-18 category.

=== World Junior Chess Championship ===
Paragua participated in two World Junior Chess Championships scoring 12 wins, 7 draws, and 7 losses for a winning percentage of 59.6%:

- At the 41st World Junior Chess Championship held in December 2002, Paragua tied for 11th–16th places with a score of 6 wins, 4 draws, and 3 losses ending up in 16th place after tiebreaks. He had a TPR of 2432 as compared to his then ELO of 2476.
- At the 43rd World Junior Chess Championship held in 2004, Paragua (6th seed with 2534 ELO) tied for 15th–21st places eventually ending up in 18th place after tie-breaks. He scored 6 wins, 3 draws, and 4 losses with a TPR of 2450.

=== FIDE World Chess Championship ===
Paragua qualified for the 2004 World Championship that took place in 2004 where he was eliminated by Viktor Bologan of Moldova in the first round. Paragua won the first game against Bologan but then lost three straight games, eliminating him from the tournament.

=== FIDE World Cup ===
Paragua was a 3-time participant in the Chess World Cup:

- At the 2005 Chess World Cup (qualifying tournament for world championship), he upset Sergei Movsesian in the first round, 1.5-0.5 winning the second game with the white pieces, before losing in the tie breaker against Alexey Dreev in the second round, 2.5-3.5 (Paragua drew both his games against Dreev in the regulation)
- He also qualified in the 2011 Chess World Cup, a 126-player field knockout tournament where he was seeded 108th (2545 ELO). Paragua earned the berth after finishing second (after tie-breaks) in the 2011 Asian Zone 3.3 chess championship. He faced the 21st-seeded Michael Adams who beat him, 1.5–0.5 in the first round.
- At the 2013 Chess World Cup, a 7-round knockout chess meant to determine the qualifiers for the 2014 Candidates. Paragua was seeded 101 with an ELO of 2569 and was eliminated in the first round by Dmitry Jakovenko 2–0.

=== Paragua breaks 2600 ELO ===
Paragua became the first Filipino to reach 2600 FIDE after he finished co-champion in the Asian Zonal 3.3 Chess Championships in September 2005.

Paragua finished the nine-round Swiss system event with 7 points. In January 2006, FIDE listed Paragua with a rating of 2618 enough to get him in the top 100.

=== Asian Individual Chess Championship ===
Paragua participated in seven editions of the Asian Individual Chess Championship:

- 3rd Asian Chess Championship (2001) where he placed 48th in a 76-player field for the 11-round Swiss System event where he scored 4 wins, 2 draws, and 5 losses with a TPR of 2458 as compared to his ELO of 2444;
- 4th Asian Chess Championship (2003) where he placed 20th in a field of 54 players in this 9-round Swiss System event where he scored 3 wins, 3 draws, and 2 losses with a TPR of 2528 (ELO rating was 2506);
- 6th Asian Chess Championship (2007) where he finished the 11-round Swiss System event in 29th place in a field of 72 players with 3 wins, 6 draws, and 2 losses with a TPR of 2474 which was way below his ELO then of 2525;
- 9th Asian Chess Championship (2009) where he finished in 61st place in the 86-player field that competed in the 11-round Swiss System event scoring 2 wins, 6 draws, and 3 losses putting up a TPR of 2400 as compared to his 2529 ELO;
- 9th Asian Chess Championship (2011) where he ended up in 29th place in the 9-round Swiss System event that featured 50 players finishing with 3 wins, 3 draws, and 3 losses with a TPR of 2472 (2542 ELO);
- 10th Asian Chess Championship (2012) where he ended up in 36th place in the 72 player-field that comprised the 9-round Swiss System event scoring 4 wins, 1 draw, and 4 losses with a TPR of 2468 as compared to his 2521 ELO; and lastly at the
- 11th Asian Chess Championship (2013) where he won the bronze medal in the 9-round Swiss System event featuring 77 players where he finished undefeated with 4 wins and 5 draws for a TPR of 2710 compared to his 2550 ELO at that time.

Overall, Paragua compiled 36 points in 68 games (52.9% winning percentage) with 23 wins, 26 draws, and 19 losses for 1 bronze medal.

=== Chess Olympiad ===
He played for the Philippines in the Chess Olympiads of 2002, 2004, 2006, and 2012, and the 2020 Online Chess Olympiad.

At the 35th Chess Olympiad, Paragua scored 5 wins, 5 draws, and 2 losses with a Tournament Performance Rating (TPR) of 2503 in Board 4 to place 19th, second-best in the team.

At the 36th Chess Olympiad, Paragua scored 6 wins, 3 draws, and 4 losses with a TPR of 2556 as compared to his ELO rating then of 2534 playing Board 3.

Paragua played the top Board for Team Philippines for the first time in his career in the 37th Chess Olympiad. He scored 2 wins, 5 draws, and 4 losses.

At the 40th Chess Olympiad, Paragua played Board 4 scoring 6 points on the strength of 3 wins, 6 draws, and 2 losses with a TPR of 2561 as compared to his 2508 ELO rating where he finished at 18th place.

In total, Paragua has already scored 25.5 points in 47 games recording 16 wins, 19 draws, and 12 losses for a 54.3% winning rate with his best performance coming at the 2012 Olympiad held at Istanbul, Turkey where he placed 18th.

In 2020, Paragua headed Team Philippines at the 2020 Online Chess Olympiad. He scored 5 wins, 1 draw, and 2 losses as he led the team to a 5th-place finish in Pool A of Division II with 10 match points.

=== Asian Cities Chess Championship ===
Paragua participated in three editions of the Asian Cities Chess Championship:

- 14th edition held in Manila, Philippines (2004) where he served as the captain of the Mandaluyong Team playing Board 1 and finishing with 4 wins, 3 draws, and 2 losses with a TPR of 2477 as compared to his then ELO of 2529. He led the team to a bronze medal finish in Team Competition;
- 15th edition played in Tehran, Iran (2007) where he again played Board 1 this time representing Team Tagaytay where he scored 3 wins, 3 draws, and 3 losses with a TPR of 2377 as against his 2573 ELO at that time leading the team to a silver medal in the Team Competition; and
- 18th edition held in Tagaytay City, Cavite, Philippines where he played Board 2 and finished with 4 wins, 3 draws, and 2 losses with a TPR of 2445 compared to his ELO of 2571 during that time leading Team Tagaytay to a gold medal finish in the Team Competition.

He finished his stint in the tournament with 15.5 points in 27 games posting 11 wins with 9 draws and 7 losses for a winning percentage of 57.4% ending up with 1 gold, 1 silver, and 1 bronze in Team Competition.

=== Philippine National Chess Championship ===
Paragua won the 2012 Philippine Chess Championship. He scored 11.5/15 with 10 wins, 3 draws, and 2 losses. He had a TPR of 2627 as against his 2508 ELO.

=== World Open ===
Paragua finished the 38th Annual World Open in a tie for 9th-18th places. He posted 5 wins, 2 draws, and 1 loss.

Paragua tied for 7th-13th places in the 42nd Annual World Open. He scored 6 points on 5 wins, 2 draws, and 2 losses after tiebreaks.

=== US tournaments ===
At the 2008 Foxwoods Open, Paragua tied for 9th-17th places scoring 5 wins, 2 draws, and 2 losses to place 13th overall after tiebreaks.

In 2016, Paragua took part in the 3rd Millionaire Chess Open. Paragua ended up in a tie for 17th-28th place where he eventually ended up in 21st place with 4 wins, 1 draw, and 2 losses which did not qualify him for the next round.

In 2017, he tied for first at the 9th annual Chesapeake Open with 5 wins, 2 draws, and no losses. The tournament employed no tie-break and Paragua won $1,100 (USD).

On July 10, 2019, Paragua topped the 12th New York Int 2019 that featured 24 players in 9 rounds with an average ELO Rating of 2309. He finished undefeated with 4 wins and 5 draws. Paragua was seeded third in this tournament with an ELO of 2503.

On July 27, 2019, Paragua won the 8th Washington Int 2019, a 9-round 35-player tournament with an average ELO Rating of 2309. He finished with 6 wins, 2 draws, and 1 loss.

Also in 2019, Paragua placed second in the 141st New York State Championship. He scored 3 wins and 3 draws ending up tied for 2nd-4th places, but ended up with the runner-up honors after tie-breaks; all the three players won $600.00 each.

On November 14, 2019, Paragua finished in joint 1st place at the 103rd ch-Marshall CC 2019. The tournament featured 10 players with an average of 2482 ELO Rating. Paragua went undefeated with 3 wins and 6 draws.

On November 27, 2019, Paragua finished in joint third place at the CCCSA Fall GM 2019 Tournament, a 10-player tournament with an average ELO Rating of 2441, finishing with 3 wins, 3 draws, and 3 losses.

On January 16, 2020, he won the Winter CCCSA GM Norm Invitational going undefeated with 3 wins and 6 draws. The tournament featured ten players with an average ELO Rating of 2433.

On February 27, 2020, Paragua won the Marshall GM Norm 2020, another 10-player tournament with an average ELO Rating of 2444, with a score of 6 wins, 2 draws, and 1 loss.

=== Other notable tournaments ===
In 2004, Paragua won the 4th Alushta Autumn as he scored a total of 11.0 points in 13 rounds on the strength of 10 wins, 2 draws, and 1 loss.

Paragua finished second in the Asian Zone 3.3 (2011) Chess Championships and clinched the last berth in the year's World Cup. Paragua actually finished tied for second but took last World Cup berth with a superior tiebreak score.

Paragua won the 2012 Mayor Allen Singson Cup (Candon City Chess Championships) in March 2012. He finished undefeated with 5 wins and 2 draws.

On May 18, 2020, Paragua topped the Curly King Shark online chess tournament. Paragua finished with 70 points in 30 games for a winning percentage of 73 percent and performance rating of 2774, coming in first place. Paragua won 12 games, drew 11, and lost 7 games.

== Personal life ==
Paragua was born to Flordeliza Callano and Ricardo Paragua, the latter of whom is also his coach. The son and father went around the world to participate in international tournaments. Paragua resided both in the city of Meycauayan and the adjacent town of Marilao in the province of Bulacan.

He became a resident of New York and coaches at the New York Chess Academy. His niece is the FIDE Master Megan Paragua.
