= Vietnam at the 2003 SEA Games =

Vietnam at the 2003 Southeast Asian Games
- IOC code: VIE
- NOC: Vietnam Olympic Committee
- Website: www.voc.org.vn (in Vietnamese and English)

in Vietnam
- Medals Ranked 1st: Gold 158 Silver 97 Bronze 91 Total 346

Southeast Asian Games appearances (overview)
- 1989; 1991; 1993; 1995; 1997; 1999; 2001; 2003; 2005; 2007; 2009; 2011; 2013; 2015; 2017; 2019; 2021; 2023; 2025; 2027; 2029

Vietnam hosted and took part in the 2003 Southeast Asian Games in Hanoi from 5–13 December 2003.

The host Vietnam performance was its best ever yet in Southeast Asian Games history and emerged as overall champion of the games.
