= 2003 SEA Games =

Multi-sport event in Vietnam

XXII Southeast Asian Games
- Host city: Hanoi and Ho Chi Minh City, Vietnam
- Motto: Solidarity, Cooperation for Peace and Development (Vietnamese: Đoàn kết, Hợp tác vì Hòa bình và Phát triển)
- Nations: 11
- Debuting countries: Timor Leste
- Athletes: 5,000
- Events: 442 in 32 sports
- Opening: 5 December 2003
- Closing: 13 December 2003
- Opened by: Phan Văn Khải; Prime Minister of Vietnam
- Closed by: Phạm Gia Khiêm; Deputy Prime Minister of Vietnam
- Athlete's Oath: Nguyễn Mạnh Tường
- Judge's Oath: Hoàng Quốc Vinh
- Torch lighter: Nguyễn Thúy Hiền
- Ceremony venue: Mỹ Đình National Stadium
- Website: 2003 Southeast Asian Games

The 2003 Southeast Asian Games (Vietnamese: Đại hội Thể thao Đông Nam Á 2003), officially known as the 22nd Southeast Asian Games, SEA Games 22 and also known as Vietnam 2003, were a Southeast Asian multi-sport event held from 5 to 13 December 2003 in Hanoi, Vietnam. This was the first time that Vietnam had staged the SEA Games, and it saw Timor-Leste, which had just gained independence in 2002; although not yet being an ASEAN member and despite its geographical location closer to the Pacific archipelago than the Asian continent, making its debut at the games.

The games was held from 5 to 13 December 2003, although several events had commenced from 29 November 2003. Around 5,000 athletes from 11 participating nations participated at the games, which featured 442 events in 32 sports. Vietnam is the eighth nation to host the Southeast Asian Games after Thailand, Myanmar, Malaysia, Singapore, Indonesia, Philippines and Brunei. The games was opened by Phan Văn Khải, the prime minister of Vietnam at the newly constructed Mỹ Đình National Stadium and was closed by Phạm Gia Khiêm, the Deputy Prime Minister of Vietnam.

The final medal tally was led by host Vietnam, followed by Thailand and Indonesia. A number of records in Games and National level were broken during this edition. The games were deemed generally successful with the rising standard of competition amongst the participating nations.

== Organisation ==
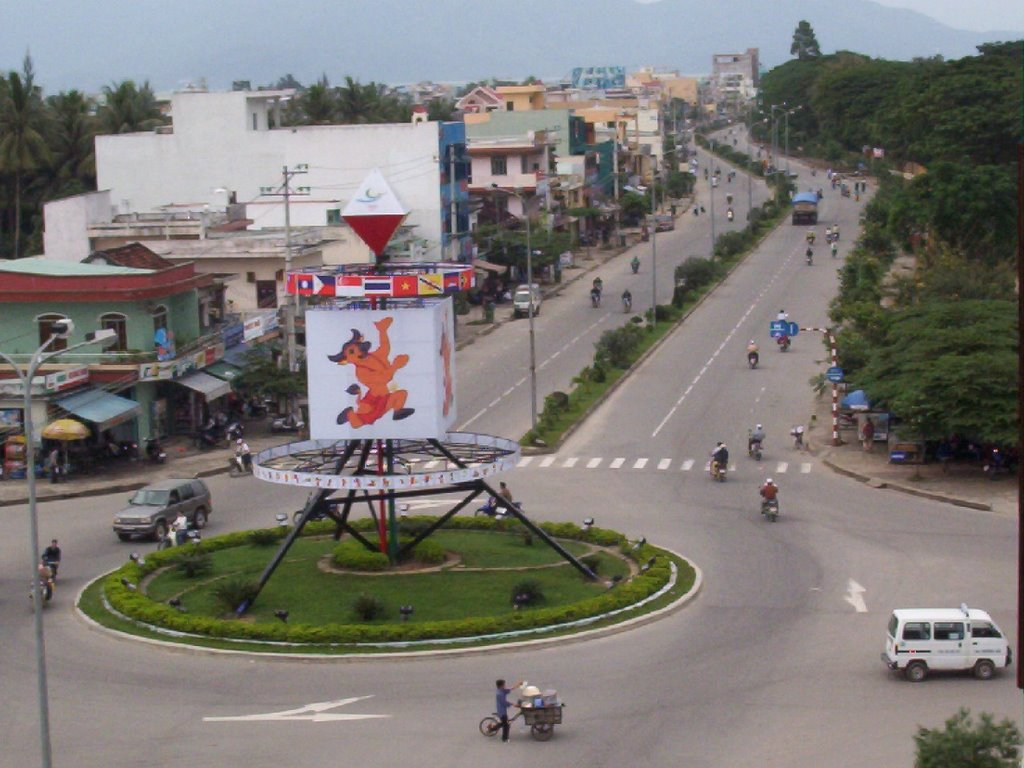
Banner promoting the Games in Vietnam

=== Development and preparation ===
The 22nd SEA Games organising committee was formed to oversee the staging of the games with Nguyen Danh Thai as its chairman. The Vietnamese government was spending a lot of money upgrading sports facilities and building new ones, including the 40,000-seat Mỹ Đình National Stadium which is the biggest stadium in the country, spending about 60 million to US$70 million for its construction.

2003 Southeast Asian Games host cities

=== Venues ===
The 2003 Southeast Asian Games used a mix of new, existing and temporary venues with the centrepiece of the activities being the Mỹ Đình Sports Complex which was opened in September 2003. Incorporating the new 40,192-seat national stadium, it hosted most of the events.

A games village was not built. Instead, a "village in the city" concept saw athletes and officials housed in hotels in Hanoi and Ho Chi Minh City. Besides being physically near to the sport venues, it was hoped that they will add vibe to both cities and reduce post-games costs in converting a dedicated games village to other uses.

The 22nd Southeast Asian Games had 31 venues for the games, 20 in Hanoi (and surrounding provinces) and 11 in Ho Chi Minh City.

City	Competition Venue	Sports
Hanoi	National Sports Complex
Hanoi	Mỹ Đình National Stadium	Athletics, Football (Men: group and knockout stage), opening and closing ceremonies
Hanoi	Mỹ Đình Aquatics Centre	Aquatics (Swimming, Diving, Water polo), Finswimming
Hanoi	Other
Hanoi	West Lake	Canoeing, Rowing, Traditional boat race
Hanoi	Hanoi National Sports Training Centre No. 1	Archery, Shooting
Hanoi	Trịnh Hoài Đức Gymnasium	Wushu
Hanoi	Cầu Giấy District Gymnasium	Fencing
Hanoi	Quần Ngựa Sports Palace	Gymnastics
Hanoi	Gia Lâm Gymnasium	Karate
Hanoi	Sóc Sơn Gymnasium	Weightlifting
Hanoi	Hai Bà Trưng Gymnasium	Sepak takraw
Hanoi	Hang Day Stadium	Football (Men: group stage)
Hanoi	Hanoi - Bac Ninh - Hoa Binh	Cycling
Hanoi	Lach Tray Stadium	Football (Women: group and knockout stage)
Hanoi	C500 Sporting Event Hall	Pencak silat
Hanoi	Thien Truong Stadium	Football (Men and Women: group stage)
Hanoi	Vinh Phuc Competition Hall	Shuttlecock
Hanoi	Hai Duong Competition Hall	Table tennis
Hanoi	Nam Dinh Province Gymnasium	Volleyball (Beach)
Hanoi	Ninh Binh Province Gymnasium	Volleyball (Indoor)
Hanoi	Ha Tay Competition Hall	Wrestling
Ho Chi Minh City	Tân Bình Gymnasium	Badminton
Ho Chi Minh City	Quân khu 7 Gymnasium	Basketball
Ho Chi Minh City	Quân khu 7 Stadium	Football (Men: group stage)
Ho Chi Minh City	Phan Đình Phùng Gymnasium	Boxing
Ho Chi Minh City	Lãnh Binh Thăng Gymnasium	Judo
Ho Chi Minh City	Phu Tho Indoor Stadium	Handball, Taekwondo
Ho Chi Minh City	Lan Anh Gymnasium	Tennis
Ho Chi Minh City	Nguyễn Du Gymnasium	Billiards and Snooker
Ho Chi Minh City	Bến Thành Theatre	Bodybuilding
Ho Chi Minh City	Van Don Sports Centre	Chess
Ho Chi Minh City	Thống Nhất Stadium	Football (Men: group stage)
Ho Chi Minh City	Ky Hoa physical training and Sporting Center, District 10	Petanque

=== Torch relay ===
The torch relay of the 2003 Southeast Asian Games began with Ho Chi Minh City and passed through several cities in Vietnam before it ended in Hanoi, which is the main venue of the games.

== Marketing ==
=== Logo ===
Trau Vang, a golden buffalo, is the official mascot of the games.

The logo of the 2003 Southeast Asian Games is a stylisation of a legendary bird named "Chim Lac". Designed by Artist Nguyen Chi Long, it depicts the bird decorated the Ngoc Lu bronze drum, a typical antiquity of the ancient Dong Son Vietnamese culture. The Emblem is composed of harmonious and strong curves that resembles movement and strength upwards represents the Olympic Spirit: "Faster, Higher and Stronger". The 5 lines of colours represents the tough and drastic competition in sports. The 10 intersecting circles, the symbol of the Southeast Asian Games Federation, represents the participating nations of the Southeast Asian Games and the Southeast Asian Games itself.

=== Mascot ===
Designed by artist Nguyen Thai Hung, the mascot of the 2003 Southeast Asian Games is a golden water buffalo named Trâu Vàng. Described as a gentle, industrious, wise, faithful and harmonious animal in nature, the buffalo resembles the water and rice civilisation in Vietnam, as well as in other Southeast Asian countries. To the Vietnamese people, the Golden Buffalo symbolises a desire for abundant harvest, prosperity, happiness, power and the Vietnamese martial spirit as well as open–heartedness, joy and hospitality of the host country.

=== Songs ===
The games' hymn was "For the World of Tomorrow" (Vietnamese: Vì một thế giới ngày mai), which was composed by Nguyen Quang Vinh. This song has 2 versions.

=== Sponsors ===
A total of 24 sponsors comprising 2 Official Partners and 22 Official Sponsors sponsored the games.

Official Partners

- LG Electronics
- Vietnam Posts and Telecommunications Group

Official Sponsors

- Petronas
- Interfood
- Vietnam Bank for Agriculture and Rural Development
- Nestle Milo
- Rinnai
- Halida
- Vietnam MobiFone
- Petrolimex
- Ha Long Canfoco
- Vietnam Airlines
- Vietnam Glass and Ceramics
- Uni-President
- Dai Bang paint
- Dong Luc Sport
- TNT N.V.
- Super Horse Energy Drink
- Petrovietnam
- Bao Viet Vietnam Insurance
- Vital
- Yamaha
- Foci
- Grand Sport

== The games ==
=== Opening ceremony ===
The opening ceremony took place at the Hanoi Mỹ Đình National Stadium at 19:00 VST. A total of 40,000 audience attended the opening ceremony. Also present at the ceremony were General Secretary Nong Duc Manh, Prime Minister Phan Van Khai, officials from ministries, national agencies, the diplomatic corps, the leaders of the Southeast Asian Sports Federation and heads of regional sporting delegations. A parallel ceremony was held in Ho Chi Minh City.

The ceremony started with the song, "Vietnam – Our Fatherland" followed by the appearance of parachutists, carrying 11 national flags of the competing Southeast Asian countries with them. The procession of Vietnam flag and the 22nd SEA Games' symbol flag then took place as all the lights in the stadium came on at once. After that, eleven regional sporting delegations, including 5,005 coaches and athletes, marched past the reviewing stand in an exciting welcome from the officials and spectators.

The sacred torch, which was taken from the Ho Chi Minh Museum was relayed by Trương Quốc Thắng (cycling), Bùi Thị Nhung (high jump), Vu Kim Anh (karate) and athletes from 10 Southeast Asian countries before it was handed to Nguyễn Thúy Hiền (wushu). Thúy Hiền then passed the flame to the prime minister, who in turn passed it to an athlete dressed like national hero Giong. The athlete who dressed like Giong then lit the flame on the cauldron which burn throughout the course of the Games. Minister-Chairman of the Physical Training and Sports Committee Nguyen Danh Thai, who is also the chairman of the Vietnam National Olympic Committee, president of the 22nd Southeast Asia Sports Council and head of the 22nd SEA Games Organising board then gave his speech, warmly welcomed party and state leaders, delegates, domestic and international guests, and 11 sports delegations from Southeast Asian countries to the 22nd SEA Games. After that, on behalf of the host country, Prime Minister Phan Van Khai declared the 22nd SEA Games open. Later, Deputy Prime Minister Pham Gia Khiem, chairman of the national steering board for the 22nd SEA Games, Minister-Chairman Nguyen Danh Thai, and Ha Noi Mayor Hoang Van Nghien presented flowers and banners to 11 participating sports delegations. After that, on behalf of the referees and athletes, referee Hoang Quoc Vinh and shooter Nguyễn Mạnh Tường swore an oath of "Solidarity, Honesty and Fair Play".

These are followed by a three part mass performance, which is more than a thousand performers including children. The parts that make up the mass performance are "The Land of the Dragon and Fairy" which depicted the Vietnamese legend of the country's origins, "Message of Peace" and "United ASEAN Looks To The Future" which comprises four performances: "Lands by the Pacific Ocean," "Essential Convergence," "New Tune," and "ASEAN Towards The Future". After the mass performance, the Games mascot, the golden buffalo and 22 singers were then appear at the center of the stage with the singers singing the Games official song "For the World of Tomorrow". The ceremony concluded with thousands of flying balls released and fireworks displayed in four places in Hanoi.

=== Closing ceremony ===
The closing ceremony was held on 13 December 2003 at the Mỹ Đình National Stadium in Hanoi at 19:00 (VST). Around 40,000 spectators attended the closing ceremony at Mỹ Đình National Stadium including Party General Secretary Nong Duc Manh, Vice President Truong My Hoa and leaders of the Asian sport federations.

The ceremony begins with laser beams shooting about in the stadium and colourful parachute gliders pierced through the sky. Athletes later marched into the stadium by order of sports competed at the games.

They were then followed by Vietnamese music played by the Vietnamese Symphonic Orchestra and performance by local dancers and singers. Nguyen Danh Thai, Minister-Chairman of the State Committee for Physical Training and Sports, President of the 22nd SEA Games Council and Head of the 22nd SEA Games Organising Committee gave his speech, affirmed that the Games have successfully concluded after boisterous competition days. Deputy Prime Minister Pham Gia Khiem, Chairman of the 22nd SEA Games national steering board, on behalf of the host country, declared the regional sporting event closed.

Then the blue SEA Games flag was taken down and brought to the Vietnamese representatives by the Vietnamese Army soldiers dressed in white uniform with Vietnamese singer My Linh and a Philippine singer sang the song "For the World of Tomorrow". At the same time, the flame of the cauldron was extinguished. Prime Minister Nguyen Danh Thai and chairman of the Hanoi People's Committee Hoang Van Nghien handed over the SEA Games flag to the chairman of the Games Organising Committee Roberto Pagdanganan and the Mayor of Manila, Lito Atienza, symbolises the Southeast Asian Games responsibilities being handed over to Philippines, host of the 2005 Southeast Asian Games. The national anthem of the Philippines was played as the National Flag of the Philippines was raised. After that, the Filipino performance troupe presented a special folk art performance, representing the host country. The ceremony concluded with a Vietnam farewell segment performance by Vietnamese dancers, showing the culture of Vietnam.

=== Participating nations ===
- Brunei
- Cambodia
- Indonesia
- Laos
- Malaysia
- Myanmar
- Philippines
- Singapore
- Thailand
- Timor-Leste
- Vietnam (Host)

=== Sports ===
- Aquatics
  - Swimming (32)
  - Finswimming (16) ³
  - Diving (8)
- Archery (4)
- Athletics (45)
- Badminton (7)
- Basketball (2)
- Billiards and snooker (12) ¹
- Bodybuilding (8) ¹
- Boxing (9)
- Canoeing (15)
- Chess (8) ¹
- Cycling (10)
- Fencing (10)
- Football (2)
- Gymnastics (24)
- Handball (2)
- Judo (16)
- Karate (19)
- Pencak silat (22) ²
- Pétanque (6) ²
- Rowing (8)
- Sepak takraw (6) ¹
- Shooting (42)
- Shuttlecock (7) ³
- Table tennis (7)
- Taekwondo (16)
- Tennis (7)
- Traditional boat race (4) ¹
- Volleyball (4)
- Weightlifting (13)
- Wrestling (22)
- Wushu (28) ¹

¹ - not an official Olympic Sport
² - sport played only in the SEA Games
³ - not a traditional Olympic nor SEA Games Sport and introduced only by the host country.

=== Calendar ===
OC	Opening ceremony	●	Event competitions	1	Gold medal events	CC	Closing ceremony

November / December	29 Sat	30 Sun	1 Mon	2 Tue	3 Wed	4 Thu	5 Fri	6 Sat	7 Sun	8 Mon	9 Tue	10 Wed	11 Thu	12 Fri	13 Sat	Gold medal events
Ceremonies							OC								CC	
Archery			●	●	●	2	●	●	●	2						4
Athletics									13	7		11	12	2		45
Badminton								●	●	2		●	●	5		7
Basketball								●	●	●	●	●	●	●	2	2
Billiards & snooker							1	2	2	2	1	1	1	2		12
Bodybuilding							●	8								8
Boxing					●	●	●	●	●	●		9				9
Canoeing										●	7	●	8			15
Chess							●	2	2	●	●	●	●	●	4	8
Cycling								2	2		1	1	2	2		10
Diving									2	2	2	2				8
Fencing												4	3	2	1	10
Fin swimming													6	4	6	16
Football	●	●		●	●	●		●	●	●	●		1	1		2
Gymnastics						1	1	2		10	1	1	4	4		24
Handball							●	●	●		2					2
Judo								4	6	6						16
Karate								5	9	5						19
Pencak silat									●	●	5	1		16		22
Pétanque								●	2	●	2	●	2			6
Rowing						●	●	4	4							8
Sepak takraw							●	2	●	●	●	2	●	●	2	6
Shooting								6	6	8	8	5	6	3		42
Shuttlecock								●	2	●	●	5				7
Swimming								8	7	6	4	7				32
Table tennis								●	●	2		●	3	2		7
Taekwondo												6	6	4		16
Tennis							●	●	2	●	●	●	3	2		7
Traditional boat race													●	2	2	4
Volleyball							●	●	●	●	●	2	●	2		4
Water polo			●	●	●	●	●	1								1
Weightlifting											3	3	4	3		13
Wrestling									●	3	5	●	●	14		22
Wushu												3	6	15	4	28
Total gold medal events	0	0	0	0	0	3	2	46	59	55	41	63	67	85	21	442
Cumulative total	0	0	0	0	0	3	5	51	110	165	206	269	336	421	442	442
November / December	29 Sat	30 Sun	1 Mon	2 Tue	3 Wed	4 Thu	5 Fri	6 Sat	7 Sun	8 Mon	9 Tue	10 Wed	11 Thu	12 Fri	13 Sat	Gold medal events

=== Medal table ===
A total of 1440 medals, comprising 444 gold medals, 441 silver medals and 555 bronze medals were awarded to athletes. The host Vietnam performance was its best ever yet in Southeast Asian Games history, emerged as overall champion of the games.

* Host nation (Vietnam)

2003 Southeast Asian Games medal table
Rank	Nation	Gold	Silver	Bronze	Total
1	Vietnam*	158	97	91	346
2	Thailand	90	93	98	281
3	Indonesia	55	68	98	221
4	Philippines	48	54	75	177
5	Malaysia	44	42	59	145
6	Singapore	30	33	50	113
7	Myanmar	16	43	50	109
8	Laos	1	5	15	21
9	Cambodia	1	5	11	17
10	Brunei	1	1	8	10
11	Timor-Leste	0	0	0	0
Totals (11 entries)		444	441	555	1,440

== See also ==
- 2003 ASEAN Para Games

Preceded by Kuala Lumpur	Southeast Asian Games; Hanoi–Ho Chi Minh City; XXII Southeast Asian Games (2003)	Succeeded by Manila
