= List of SEA Games medalists in swimming (men) =

This is the complete list of men's Southeast Asian Games medalists in swimming.

== Current program ==
=== 50 metre freestyle ===
| Event | Gold | | Silver | | Bronze | |
|---|---|---|---|---|---|---|
| 1989 Kuala Lumpur | Ang Peng Siong; Singapore | 23.27 | Richard Sam Bera; Indonesia Harold Gan; Singapore | 24.46 | | |
| 1991 Manila | Ang Peng Siong; Singapore | 23.89 | Richard Sam Bera; Indonesia | | Raymond Papa; Philippines | 24.48 |
| 1993 Singapore | Ang Peng Siong; Singapore | 23.67 | Richard Sam Bera; Indonesia | 23.73 | Wisnu Wardhana; Indonesia | 24.00 |
| 1995 Chiang Mai | Richard Sam Bera; Indonesia | 23.42 | Wisnu Wardhana; Indonesia | 24.21 | Ernest Teo; Singapore | 24.21 |
| 1997 Jakarta | Richard Sam Bera; Indonesia | 23.40 | Raymond Papa; Philippines | 23.78 | Leslie Kwok; Singapore | 23.83 |
| 1999 Bandar Seri Begawan | Richard Sam Bera; Indonesia | 23.49 | Wisnu Wardhana; Indonesia | 23.71 | Leslie Kwok; Singapore | 23.79 |
| 2001 Kuala Lumpur | Richard Sam Bera; Indonesia | 23.03 | Arwut Chinnapasaen; Thailand | 23.36 | Allen Ong Hou Ming; Malaysia | 23.55 |
| 2003 Hanoi | Arwut Chinnapasaen; Thailand | 23.33 | Allen Ong Hou Ming; Singapore | 23.69 | Richard Sam Bera; Indonesia | 23.73 |
| 2005 Manila | Arwut Chinnapasaen; Thailand | 22.98 | Richard Sam Bera; Indonesia | 23.36 | Leslie Kwok; Singapore | 23.58 |
| 2007 Nakhon Ratchasima | Daniel Coakley; Philippines | 22.80 | Arwut Chinnapasaen; Thailand | 23.24 | Russell Ong; Singapore | 23.51 |
| 2009 Vientiane | Daniel Coakley; Philippines | 22.62; GR | Arwut Chinnapasaen; Thailand | 22.75 | Russell Ong; Singapore | 22.98 |
| 2011 Palembang | Arren Quek; Singapore | 23.28 | Triady Fauzi Sidiq; Indonesia | 23.32 | Russell Ong; Singapore | 23.33 |
| 2013 Naypyidaw | Triady Fauzi Sidiq; Indonesia | 23.12 | Russell Ong; Singapore | 23.14 | Gavin Alexander Lewis; Thailand | 23.41 |
| 2015 Singapore | Joseph Isaac Schooling; Singapore | 22.47; GR | Napat Wesshasartar; Thailand | 23.08 | Triady Fauzi Sidiq; Indonesia | 23.11 |
| 2017 Kuala Lumpur | Teong Tzen Wei; Singapore | 22.55 | Triady Fauzi Sidiq; Indonesia | 22.66; NR | Lê Nguyễn Paul; Vietnam | 22.90; NR |
| 2019 Philippines | Jonathan Tan; Singapore | 22.25; GR, NR | Teong Tzen Wei; Singapore | 22.40 | Luke Gebbie; Philippines | 22.62 |
| 2021 Vietnam | Teong Tzen Wei; Singapore | 21.93; GR, NR | Jonathan Tan; Singapore | 22.24 | Luong Jérémie Loïc Nino; Vietnam | 22.85; NR |
| 2023 Cambodia | Jonathan Tan; Singapore | 21.95 | Teong Tzen Wei; Singapore | 22.50 | Luong Jérémie Loïc Nino; Vietnam | 22.84 |

=== 100 metre freestyle ===
| Event | Gold | | Silver | | Bronze | |
|---|---|---|---|---|---|---|
| 1959 Bangkok | Tin Maung Ni; Burma | 1:00.2; GR | Miya Thee; Burma | | Tan Cheow Choon; Singapore | 1:00.9 |
| 1961 Rangoon | Miya Thee; Burma | 1:01.0 | Aung Than; Burma | 1:01.3 | Eric Yeo; Singapore | 1:01.06 |
| 1965 Kuala Lumpur | Tan Thuan Heng; Singapore | 57.9 | Tieng Sok; Cambodia | 58.5 | Somchai Limpichat; Thailand | 1:00.3 |
| 1967 Bangkok | Tan Thuan Heng; Singapore | 56.7 | Narong Chok Unmuay; Thailand | 59.0 | D. Kongcharoen; Thailand | 59.5 |
| 1969 Rangoon | Tan Thuan Heng; Singapore | 57.4 | Ohn Thwin; Burma | | Nanda Kyaw Zwa; Burma | |
| 1971 Kuala Lumpur | Tan Thuan Heng; Singapore | 57.05 | Tan Bun Thay; Khmer Republic | 57.43 | Aung Hlain Win; Burma | 59.25 |
| 1973 Singapore | Tan Thuan Heng; Singapore | 56.76 | Prak Samnang; Khmer Republic | 57.50 | Alex Chan; Singapore | 57.60 |
| 1975 Bangkok | Tan Thuan Heng; Singapore | 56.90 | David Hoe; Singapore | 57.54 | Aung Khine; Burma | 57.8 |
| 1977 Kuala Lumpur | Kristiono Sumono; Indonesia | 55.4 | Gerald Item; Indonesia | | Marc Tay; Singapore | 56.83 |
| 1979 Jakarta | Gerald Item; Indonesia | 55.12 | Ang Peng Siong; Singapore | 55.47 | John Item; Indonesia | 56.01 |
| 1981 Manila | Lukman Niode; Indonesia | 54.40 | Gerald Item; Indonesia | 54.80 | Tay Khoon Hean; Singapore | 55.56 |
| 1983 Singapore | Ang Peng Siong; Singapore | 53.58 | Tay Khoon Hean; Singapore | 54.45 | Lukman Niode; Indonesia | 54.63 |
| 1985 Bangkok | Ang Peng Siong; Singapore | 52.42 | Oon Jin Gee; Singapore | 53.44 | Padhanaseth Changkasiri; Thailand | 54.04 |
| 1987 Jakarta | Ang Peng Siong; Singapore | 52.34 | Oon Jin Gee; Singapore | 53.13 | Eric Buhain; Philippines | 54.25 |
| 1989 Kuala Lumpur | Richard Sam Bera; Indonesia | 52.19 | Ang Peng Siong; Singapore | 52.53 | Mustamsikin; Indonesia | 54.96 |
| 1991 Manila | Richard Sam Bera; Indonesia | 52.30 | Wisnu Warsono; Indonesia | 53.67 | Kenneth Yeo; Singapore | 53.95 |
| 1993 Singapore | Wisnu Wardhana; Indonesia | 51.31 | Richard Sam Bera; Indonesia | 52.55 | Padhanaseth Changkasiri; Thailand | 53.27 |
| 1995 Chiang Mai | Richard Sam Bera; Indonesia | 52.11 | Wisnu Wardhana; Indonesia | 52.98 | Padhanaseth Changkasiri; Thailand | 53.21 |
| 1997 Jakarta | Richard Sam Bera; Indonesia | 51.84 | Raymond Papa; Philippines | 52.07 | Allen Ong; Malaysia | 52.76 |
| 1999 Bandar Seri Begawan | Richard Sam Bera; Indonesia | 51.03 | Allen Ong; Malaysia | 51.73 | Mark Chay; Singapore | 51.95 |
| 2001 Kuala Lumpur | Richard Sam Bera; Indonesia | 51.03 | Allen Ong; Malaysia | 51.31 | Mark Chay; Singapore | 51.76 |
| 2003 Hanoi | Allen Ong; Malaysia | 51.57 | Mark Chay; Singapore | 51.96 | Miguel Molina; Philippines | 52.85 |
| 2005 Manila | Richard Sam Bera; Indonesia | 51.94 | Daniel Bego; Malaysia | 52.35 | Bryan Tay; Singapore | 52.38 |
| 2007 Nakhon Ratchasima | Bryan Tay; Singapore | 51.23 | Daniel Bego; Malaysia | 51.53 | Kendrick Uy; Philippines | 52.16 |
| 2009 Vientiane | Daniel Bego; Malaysia | 50.16; GR | Charles Walker; Philippines | 50.96 | Russell Ong; Singapore | 51.05 |
| 2011 Palembang | Hoàng Quý Phước; Vietnam | 50.79 | Danny Yeo Kai Quan; Singapore | 50.98 | Triady Fauzi Sidiq; Indonesia | 51.36 |
| 2013 Naypyidaw | Triady Fauzi Sidiq; Indonesia | 49.99; GR | Hoàng Quý Phước; Vietnam | 50.52 | Danny Yeo Kai Quan; Singapore | 50.83 |
| 2015 Singapore | Joseph Schooling; Singapore | 48.58; GR | Quah Zheng Wen; Singapore | 49.91 | Hoàng Quý Phước; Vietnam | 50.60 |
| 2017 Kuala Lumpur | Joseph Schooling; Singapore | 48.93 | Hoàng Quý Phước; Vietnam | 49.31 | Darren Lim Fang Yue; Singapore | 50.56 |
| 2019 Philippines | Darren Chua; Singapore | 49.59 | Joseph Schooling; Singapore | 49.64 | Hoàng Quý Phước; Vietnam | 50.08 |
| 2021 Vietnam | Quah Zheng Wen; Singapore | 49.57 | Jonathan Tan; Singapore Luong Jérémie Loïc Nino; Vietnam | 50.14 | No medal awarded | |
| 2023 Cambodia | Jonathan Tan; Singapore | 48.80 | Quah Zheng Wen; Singapore | 48.99 | Luong Jérémie Loïc Nino; Vietnam | 49.69 |

=== 200 metre freestyle ===
| Event | Gold | | Silver | | Bronze | |
|---|---|---|---|---|---|---|
| 1959 Bangkok | Tin Maung Ni; Burma | 2:17.7 | Mya Thee; Burma | 2:22.4 | Tan Cheow Choon; Singapore | 2:24.8 |
| 1961 Rangoon | Tin Maung Ni; Burma | 2:13.9 | Mya Thee; Burma | | Tan Thuan Heng; Singapore | 2:19.5 |
| 1965 Kuala Lumpur | Tan Thuan Heng; Singapore | 2:07.9 | Tin Maung Ni; Burma | 2:10.5 | Tieng Sok; Cambodia | 2:14.1 |
| 1967 Bangkok | Tan Thuan Heng; Singapore | 2:05.5 | D. Kongcharoen; Thailand | 2:12.7 | Daniel Howe; Singapore | 2:21.2 |
| 1969 Rangoon | Tan Thuan Heng; Singapore | 2:06.4 | Ohn Thwin; Burma | 2:10.2 | Lim Cheik Sung; Malaysia | 2:13.6 |
| 1971 Kuala Lumpur | Tan Thuan Heng; Singapore | 2:07.10 | Tan Bun Thay; Khmer Republic | 2:08.54 | Eat Kim Heng; Khmer Republic | 2:09.90 |
| 1973 Singapore | Mark Chan; Singapore | 2:07.90 | Khoo Teng Chuan; Singapore | 2:08.18 | Tan Bun Thay; Khmer Republic | 2:08.5 |
| 1975 Bangkok | Jonathan Davidson; Malaysia | 2:04.8 | Khoo Teng Chuan; Singapore | 2:05.7 | Roy Chan; Singapore | 2:07.6 |
| 1977 Kuala Lumpur | Kristiono Sumono; Indonesia | 1:58.84 | Gerald Item; Indonesia | | Jairulla Jaitulla; Philippines | |
| 1979 Jakarta | Gerald Item; Indonesia | 2:01.43 | Dwi Widjajanto; Indonesia | 2:02.69 | Vicente Cheng; Philippines | 2:03.46 |
| 1981 Manila | William Wilson; Philippines | 1:58.17 | Lukman Niode; Indonesia | 1:58.31 | Gerald Item; Indonesia | 2:00.28 |
| 1983 Singapore | William Wilson; Philippines | 1:57.97 | Lukman Niode; Indonesia | 1:58.18 | Tay Khoon Hean; Singapore | 1:59.32 |
| 1985 Bangkok | William Wilson; Philippines | 1:57.25 | Oon Jin Gee; Singapore | 1:57.63 | Daniel Arief Budiman; Indonesia | 1:57.72 |
| 1987 Jakarta | Eric Buhain; Philippines | 1:56.84 | Oon Jin Gee; Singapore | 1:57.01 | Daniel Arief Budiman; Indonesia | 1:58.07 |
| 1989 Kuala Lumpur | David Lim; Singapore | 1:55.93 | Oon Jin Gee; Singapore | 1:56.34 | Eric Buhain; Philippines | 1:56.62 |
| 1991 Manila | Richard Sam Bera; Indonesia | 1:54.72 | Jeffrey Ong; Malaysia | 1:55.97 | Albert Soetanto; Indonesia | 1:58.59 |
| 1993 Singapore | Richard Sam Bera; Indonesia | 1:54.86 | Wisnu Wardhana; Indonesia | 1:55.71 | Kenneth Yeo; Singapore | 1:55.73 |
| 1995 Chiang Mai | Torlarp Sethsothorn; Thailand | 1:53.92 | Raymond Papa; Philippines | 1:54.66 | Vicha Ratanachote; Thailand | 1:55.09 |
| 1997 Jakarta | Torlarp Sethsothorn; Thailand | 1:52.97 | Raymond Papa; Philippines | 1:53.19 | Sng Ju Wei; Singapore | 1:53.46 |
| 1999 Brunei Darussalam | Vicha Ratanachote; Thailand | 1:53.43 | Mark Chay; Singapore | 1:53.98 | Sng Ju Wei; Singapore | 1:54.25 |
| 2001 Kuala Lumpur | Mark Chay; Singapore | 1:52.67 | Dulyarit Phuangthong; Thailand | 1:52.87 | Sng Ju Wei; Singapore | 1:54.33 |
| 2003 Hanoi | Miguel Molina; Philippines | 1:52.89 | Gary Tan; Singapore | 1:53.58 | Daniel Bego; Malaysia | 1:55.36 |
| 2005 Manila | Daniel Bego; Malaysia | 1:52.67 | Miguel Molina; Philippines | 1:52.83 | Bryan Tay; Singapore | 1:54.39 |
| 2007 Nakhon Ratchasima | Daniel Bego; Malaysia | 1:52.32 | Bryan Tay; Singapore | 1:52.98 | Miguel Molina; Philippines | 1:53.59 |
| 2009 Vientiane | Daniel Bego; Malaysia | 1:49.22 | Miguel Molina; Philippines | 1:51.71 | Joshua Lim; Singapore | 1:51.76 |
| 2011 Palembang | Danny Yeo; Singapore | 1:51.07 | Jessie Lacuna; Philippines | 1:52.23 | Jeremy Kevin Matthews; Singapore | 1:52.36 |
| 2013 Naypyidaw | Hoàng Quý Phước; Vietnam | 1:50.64 | Daniel Bego; Malaysia | 1:51.10 | Quah Zheng Wen; Singapore | 1:51.66 |
| 2015 Singapore | Hoàng Quý Phước; Vietnam | 1:48.96 GR | Quah Zheng Wen; Singapore | 1:49.17 NR | Welson Sim; Malaysia | 1:50.73 |
| 2017 Kuala Lumpur | Welson Sim; Malaysia | 1:47.79 | Hoàng Quý Phước; Vietnam | 1:48.07 NR | Danny Yeo; Singapore | 1:48.49 |
| 2019 Philippines | Darren Chua; Singapore | 1:48.26 | Welson Sim; Malaysia | 1:48.52 | Hoàng Quý Phước; Vietnam | 1:48.59 |
| 2021 Vietnam | Khiew Hoe Yean; Malaysia | 1:47.81 | Quah Zheng Wen; Singapore | 1:47.85 | Hoàng Quý Phước; Vietnam | 1:49.35 |
| 2023 Cambodia | Khiew Hoe Yean; Malaysia | 1:48.91 | Dulyawat Kaewsriyong; Thailand | 1:49.29; NR | Nguyễn Huy Hoàng; Vietnam | 1:49.31 |

=== 400 metre freestyle ===
| Event | Gold | | Silver | | Bronze | |
|---|---|---|---|---|---|---|
| 1977 Kuala Lumpur | | | | | | |
| 1979 Jakarta | | | | | | |
| 1981 Manila | | | | | | |
| 1983 Singapore | | | | | | |
| 1985 Bangkok | | | | | | |
| 1987 Jakarta | | | | | | |
| 1989 Kuala Lumpur | | | | | | |
| 1991 Manila | | | | | | |
| 1993 Singapore | | | | | | |
| 1995 Chiang Mai | Torlarp Sethsothorn; Thailand | 3:57.43 | Vicha Ratanachote; Thailand | | Albert Sutanto; Indonesia | |
| 1997 Jakarta | Torlarp Sethsothorn; Thailand | 3:58.63 | Torwai Sethsothorn; Thailand | 4:01.32 | Dieung Anak Manggang; Malaysia | 4:02.67 |
| 1999 Bandar Seri Begawan | Dieung Anak Manggang; Malaysia | 4:00.34 | Sng Ju Wei; Singapore | 4:04.55 | Torwai Sethsothorn; Thailand | 4:05.17 |
| 2001 Kuala Lumpur | Torwai Sethsothorn; Thailand | 3:58.18 | Miguel Mendoza; Philippines | 3:59.75 | Dieung Anak Manggang; Malaysia | 4:00.12 |
| 2003 Hanoi | Charnvudth Saengsri; Thailand | 3:59.91 | Miguel Mendoza; Philippines | 4:03.54 | Miguel Molina; Philippines | 4:05.12 |
| 2005 Manila | Lionel Lee; Singapore | 4:00.51 | Akbar Nasution; Indonesia | 4:00.57 | Charnvudth Saengsri; Thailand | 4:02.36 |
| 2007 Nakhon Ratchasima | Tharnnawat Worakiart; Thailand | 3:59.08 | Marcus Cheah; Singapore | 3:59.61 | Ryan Arabejo; Philippines | 3:59.81 |
| 2009 Vientiane | Daniel Bego; Malaysia | 3:53.99 | Ryan Arabejo; Philippines | 3:56.06 | Sarit Tiewong; Thailand | 3:57.79 |
| 2011 Palembang | Kevin Yeap; Malaysia | 3:55.07 | Sarit Tiewong; Thailand | 3:55.95 | Jeremy Kevin Matthews; Singapore | 3:58.48 |
| 2013 Naypyidaw | Daniel Bego; Malaysia | 3:54.89 | Hoang Quy Phuoc; Vietnam | 3:57.73 | Tanakrit Kittaya; Thailand | 3:59.00 |
| 2015 Singapore | Welson Sim; Malaysia | 3:53.97 GR | Jessie Lacuna; Philippines | 3:55.34 | Pang Sheng Jun; Singapore | 3:57.60 |
| 2017 Kuala Lumpur | Welson Sim; Malaysia | 3:50.26 GR | Aflah Fadlan Prawira; Indonesia | 3:54.15 NR | Nguyễn Hữu Kim Sơn; Vietnam | 3:54.20 NR |

=== 1500 metre freestyle ===
| Event | Gold | | Silver | | Bronze | |
|---|---|---|---|---|---|---|
| 1977 Kuala Lumpur | | | | | | |
| 1979 Jakarta | | | | | | |
| 1981 Manila | | | | | | |
| 1983 Singapore | | | | | | |
| 1985 Bangkok | | | | | | |
| 1987 Jakarta | | | | | | |
| 1989 Kuala Lumpur | | | | | | |
| 1991 Manila | | | | | | |
| 1993 Singapore | | | | | | |
| 1995 Chiang Mai | | | | | | |
| 1997 Jakarta | | | | | | |
| 1999 Bandar Seri Begawan | | | | | | |
| 2001 Kuala Lumpur | | | | | | |
| 2003 Hanoi | | | | | | |
| 2005 Manila | Miguel Mendoza; Philippines | 15:47.46 | Charnvudth Saengsri; Thailand | 15:55.42 | Ryan Arabejo; Philippines | 16:09.88 |
| 2007 Nakhon Ratchasima | Ryan Arabejo; Philippines | 15:53.16 | Tharnnawat Worakiart; Thailand | 15:58.92 | Marcus Cheah; Singapore | 16:07.99 |
| 2009 Vientiane | Ryan Arabejo; Philippines | 15:37.75 | Kevin Yeap; Malaysia | 15:51.80 | Punyawee Sontana; Thailand | 16:02.21 |
| 2011 Palembang | Teo Zhen Ren; Singapore | 15:44.32 | Kevin Yeap; Malaysia | 15:53.79 | Ryan Arabejo; Philippines | 16:01.26 |
| 2013 Naypyidaw | Lâm Quang Nhật; Vietnam | 15:39.44 | Kevin Yeap; Malaysia | 15:45.89 | Welson Sim; Malaysia | 15:57.98 |
| 2015 Singapore | Lâm Quang Nhật; Vietnam | 15:31.03 GR | Aflah Fadlan Prawira; Indonesia | 15:38.23 NR | Kevin Yeap; Malaysia | 15:55.69 |
| 2017 Kuala Lumpur | Nguyễn Huy Hoàng; Vietnam | 15:20.10 GR, NR | Lâm Quang Nhật; Vietnam | 15:23.94 | Aflah Fadlan Prawira; Indonesia | 15:28.69 NR |

=== 50 metre backstroke ===
| Event | Gold | | Silver | | Bronze | |
|---|---|---|---|---|---|---|
| 2011 Palembang | I Gede Siman Sudartawa; Indonesia | 25.62 GR | Glenn Victor Sutanto; Indonesia | 26.02 | Quah Zheng Wen; Singapore | 26.38 |
| 2015 Singapore | Quah Zheng Wen; Singapore | 25.27 GR | I Gede Siman Sudartawa; Indonesia | 25.34 | Kasipat Chograthin; Thailand | 25.78 |
| 2017 Kuala Lumpur | I Gede Siman Sudartawa; Indonesia | 25.20 GR | Quah Zheng Wen; Singapore | 25.39 | Lê Nguyễn Paul; Vietnam | 25.82 |

=== 100 metre backstroke ===
| Event | Gold | | Silver | | Bronze | |
|---|---|---|---|---|---|---|
| 1977 Kuala Lumpur | | | | | | |
| 1979 Jakarta | | | | | | |
| 1981 Manila | | | | | | |
| 1983 Singapore | | | | | | |
| 1985 Bangkok | | | | | | |
| 1987 Jakarta | David Lim; Singapore | 58.62 | Lukman Niode; Indonesia | 59.45 | Eric Buhain; Philippines | 1:03.23 |
| 1989 Kuala Lumpur | David Lim; Singapore | 58.87 | Irvin Ng; Singapore | 1:02.20 | Nopporn Chaoprasert; Thailand | 1:02.80 |
| 1991 Manila | David Lim; Singapore | 58.50 | Leo Najera; Philippines | 59.08 | Raymond Papa; Philippines | 1:00.12 |
| 1993 Singapore | Raymond Papa; Philippines | 58.45 | Leo Najera; Philippines | 59.53 | | |
| 1995 Chiang Mai | Raymond Papa; Philippines | 58.03 | Dulyarit Phuangthong; Thailand | 58.81 | Gerald Koh; Singapore | 59.76 |
| 1997 Jakarta | Raymond Papa; Philippines | 56.48 | Alex Lim; Malaysia | 56.62 | Dulyarit Phuangthong; Thailand | 58.15 |
| 1999 Bandar Seri Begawan | Alex Lim; Malaysia | 56.20 | Gary Tan; Singapore | 58.00 | Felix Sutanto; Indonesia | 59.27 |
| 2001 Kuala Lumpur | Alex Lim; Malaysia | 56.16 | Dulyarit Phuangthong; Thailand | 57.71 | Gary Tan; Singapore | 57.89 |
| 2003 Hanoi | Alex Lim; Malaysia | 57.51 | Mark Chay; Singapore | 59.14 | Suriya Suksuphak; Thailand | 59.80 |
| 2005 Manila | Alex Lim; Malaysia | 56.97 | Mark Chay; Singapore | 58.49 | Suriya Suksuphak; Thailand | 58.76 |
| 2007 Nakhon Ratchasima | Zach Ong; Singapore | 59.46 | Glenn Victor Sutanto; Indonesia | 59.56 | Do Huy Long; Vietnam | 59.60 |
| 2009 Vientiane | Glenn Victor Sutanto; Indonesia | 56.42 | Rainer Ng; Singapore | 56.73 | Zach Ong; Singapore | 56.89 |
| 2011 Palembang | I Gede Siman Sudartawa; Indonesia | 55.59 GR | Glenn Victor Sutanto; Indonesia | 56.52 | Zach Ong; Singapore | 56.96 |
| 2013 Naypyidaw | I Gede Siman Sudartawa; Indonesia | 55.80 | Quah Zheng Wen; Singapore | 56.11 | Ricky Anggawidjaja; Indonesia | 57.27 |
| 2015 Singapore | Quah Zheng Wen; Singapore | 54.51 GR | I Gede Siman Sudartawa; Indonesia | 55.60 | Tran Duy Khoi; Vietnam | 56.31 NR |
| 2017 Kuala Lumpur | Quah Zheng Wen; Singapore | 54.81 | I Gede Siman Sudartawa; Indonesia | 54.94 NR | Francis Fong; Singapore | 55.92 |

=== 200 metre backstroke ===
| Event | Gold | | Silver | | Bronze | |
|---|---|---|---|---|---|---|
| 1977 Kuala Lumpur | | | | | | |
| 1979 Jakarta | | | | | | |
| 1981 Manila | | | | | | |
| 1983 Singapore | | | | | | |
| 1985 Bangkok | | | | | | |
| 1987 Jakarta | | | | | | |
| 1989 Kuala Lumpur | | | | | | |
| 1991 Manila | | | | | | |
| 1993 Singapore | | | | | | |
| 1995 Chiang Mai | | | | | | |
| 1997 Jakarta | | | | | | |
| 1999 Bandar Seri Begawan | | | | | | |
| 2001 Kuala Lumpur | | | | | | |
| 2003 Hanoi | | | | | | |
| 2005 Manila | | | | | | |
| 2007 Nakhon Ratchasima | | | | | | |
| 2009 Vientiane | | | | | | |
| 2011 Palembang | | | | | | |
| 2013 Naypyidaw | Ricky Anggawidjaja; Indonesia | 2:03.44 | I Gede Siman Sudartawa; Indonesia | 2:04.10 | Zach Ong; Singapore | 2:05.38 |
| 2015 Singapore | Quah Zheng Wen; Singapore | 2:00.55 GR | Tran Duy Khoi; Vietnam | 2:02.44 NR | Ricky Anggawidjaja; Indonesia | 2:03.03 |
| 2017 Kuala Lumpur | Quah Zheng Wen; Singapore | 2:00.09 GR | Francis Fong Jia Yi; Singapore | 2:00.49 | Ricky Anggawidjaja; Indonesia | 2:02.76 |

=== 50 metre breaststroke ===
| Event | Gold | | Silver | | Bronze | |
|---|---|---|---|---|---|---|
| 2011 Palembang | Indra Gunawan; Indonesia | 28.25 GR | Ng Jia Hao; Singapore | 28.66 | Nicko Biondi Ricardo; Indonesia | 28.85 |
| 2015 Singapore | Indra Gunawan; Indonesia | 28.27 | Joshua Hall; Philippines | 28.32 | Wong Fu Kang; Malaysia | 28.67 |
| 2017 Kuala Lumpur | Indra Gunawan; Indonesia | 28.25 GR | James Deiparine; Philippines | 28.60 | Lionel Khoo Chien Yin; Singapore | 28.63 |

=== 100 metre breaststroke ===
| Event | Gold | Silver | Bronze |
|---|---|---|---|
| 1977 Kuala Lumpur | | | |
| 1979 Jakarta | | | |
| 1981 Manila | | | |
| 1983 Singapore | | | |
| 1985 Bangkok | | | |
| 1987 Jakarta | | | |
| 1989 Kuala Lumpur | | | |
| 1991 Manila | | | |
| 1993 Singapore | | | |
| 1995 Chiang Mai | | | |
| 1997 Jakarta | | | |
| 1999 Bandar Seri Begawan | | | |
| 2001 Kuala Lumpur | | | |
| 2003 Hanoi | | | |
| 2005 Manila | | | |
| 2007 Nakhon Ratchasima | | | |
| 2009 Vientiane | | | |
| 2011 Palembang | | | |
| 2013 Naypyidaw | | | |
| 2015 Singapore | | | |
| 2017 Kuala Lumpur | | | |

=== 200 metre breaststroke ===
| Event | Gold | Silver | Bronze |
|---|---|---|---|
| 1977 Kuala Lumpur | | | |
| 1979 Jakarta | | | |
| 1981 Manila | | | |
| 1983 Singapore | | | |
| 1985 Bangkok | | | |
| 1987 Jakarta | | | |
| 1989 Kuala Lumpur | | | |
| 1991 Manila | | | |
| 1993 Singapore | | | |
| 1995 Chiang Mai | | | |
| 1997 Jakarta | | | |
| 1999 Bandar Seri Begawan | | | |
| 2001 Kuala Lumpur | | | |
| 2003 Hanoi | | | |
| 2005 Manila | | | |
| 2007 Nakhon Ratchasima | | | |
| 2009 Vientiane | | | |
| 2011 Palembang | | | |
| 2013 Naypyidaw | | | |
| 2015 Singapore | | | |
| 2017 Kuala Lumpur | | | |

=== 50 metre butterfly ===
| Event | Gold | | Silver | | Bronze | |
|---|---|---|---|---|---|---|
| 2011 Palembang | Joseph Schooling; Singapore | 24.06 GR | Glenn Victor Sutanto; Indonesia | 24.20 | Hoang Quy Phuoc; Vietnam | 24.66 |
| 2015 Singapore | Joseph Schooling; Singapore | 23.49 GR | Glenn Victor Sutanto; Indonesia | 24.12 | Quah Zheng Wen; Singapore | 24.36 |
| 2017 Kuala Lumpur | Joseph Schooling; Singapore | 23.05 GR | Triady Fauzi Sidiq; Indonesia | 24.01 NR | Le Nguyen Paul; Vietnam | 24.37 |

=== 100 metre butterfly ===
| Event | Gold | Silver | Bronze |
|---|---|---|---|
| 1977 Kuala Lumpur | | | |
| 1979 Jakarta | | | |
| 1981 Manila | | | |
| 1983 Singapore | | | |
| 1985dsdsdsdsd Bangkok | | | |
| 1987 Jakarta | | | |
| 1989 Kuala Lumpur | | | |
| 1991 Manila | | | |
| 1993 Singapore | | | |
| 1995 Chiang Mai | | | |
| 1997 Jakarta | | | |
| 1999 Bandar Seri Begawan | | | |
| 2001 Kuala Lumpur | | | |
| 2003 Hanoi | | | |
| 2005 Manila | | | |
| 2007 Nakhon Ratchasima | | | |
| 2009 Vientiane | | | |
| 2011 Palembang | | | |
| 2013 Naypyidaw | | | |
| 2015 Singapore | | | |
| 2017 Kuala Lumpur | | | |

=== 200 metre butterfly ===
| Event | Gold | Silver | Bronze |
|---|---|---|---|
| 1977 Kuala Lumpur | | | |
| 1979 Jakarta | | | |
| 1981 Manila | | | |
| 1983 Singapore | | | |
| 1985 Bangkok | | | |
| 1987 Jakarta | | | |
| 1989 Kuala Lumpur | | | |
| 1991 Manila | | | |
| 1993 Singapore | | | |
| 1995 Chiang Mai | | | |
| 1997 Jakarta | | | |
| 1999 Bandar Seri Begawan | | | |
| 2001 Kuala Lumpur | | | |
| 2003 Hanoi | | | |
| 2005 Manila | | | |
| 2007 Nakhon Ratchasima | | | |
| 2009 Vientiane | | | |
| 2011 Palembang | | | |
| 2013 Naypyidaw | | | |
| 2015 Singapore | | | |
| 2017 Kuala Lumpur | | | |

=== 200 metre individual medley ===
| Event | Gold | Silver | Bronze |
|---|---|---|---|
| 1979 Jakarta | | | |

=== 400 metre individual medley ===
| Event | Gold | Silver | Bronze |
|---|---|---|---|
| 1965 Kuala Lumpur | | | |
| 1967 Bangkok | | | |
| 1969 Rangoon | | | |

=== 4 × 100 metre freestyle relay ===
| Event | Gold | Silver | Bronze |

=== 4 × 200 metre freestyle relay ===
| Event | Gold | Silver | Bronze |

=== 4 × 100 metre medley relay ===
| Event | Gold | Silver | Bronze |
