= Aquatics at the 1997 SEA Games =

Aquatic events held at the 1997 Southeast Asian Games

Aquatics at the 1997 Southeast Asian Games included swimming, diving, synchronized swimming and water polo events and were held at Senayan Aquatic Centre in Jakarta, Indonesia. Aquatics events were held between 11 October to 16 October.

== Medal winners ==
=== Swimming ===
Men's events

Event	Gold		Silver		Bronze	
50 m freestyle	(Indonesia) Richard Sam Bera	23.40	(Philippines) Raymond Papa	23.78	(Singapore) Leslie Kwok	23.83
100 m freestyle	(Indonesia) Richard Sam Bera	51.84	(Philippines) Raymond Papa	52.07	(Malaysia) Allen Ong Hou Ming	52.76
200 m freestyle	(Thailand) Torlarp Sethsothorn	1:52.97	(Philippines) Raymond Papa	1:53.19	(Singapore) Sng Ju Wei	1:53.46
400 m freestyle	(Thailand) Torlarp Sethsothorn	3:58.63	(Thailand) Torwai Sethsothorn	4:01.32	(Malaysia) Dieung Manggang	4:02.67
1500 m freestyle	(Thailand) Torlarp Sethsothorn	16:00.39	(Thailand) Torwai Sethsothorn	16.02.21	(Malaysia) Dieung Manggang	16:08.87
100 m backstroke	(Philippines) Raymond Papa	56.48	(Malaysia) Alex Lim Keng Liat	56.62	(Thailand) Dulyarit Phuangthong	58.15
200 m backstroke	(Philippines) Raymond Papa	2:00.96	(Malaysia) Alex Lim Keng Liat	2:02.89	(Thailand) Dulyarit Phuangthong	2:05.54
100 m breaststroke	(Malaysia) Elvin Chia Tshun Thau	1:04.48	(Thailand) Ratapong Sirisanont	1:04.95	(Singapore) Kenneth Goh	1:05.12
200 m breaststroke	(Thailand) Ratapong Sirisanont	2:18.70	(Malaysia) Elvin Chia Tshun Thau	2:21.10	(Singapore) Bryan Choo Chee Wei	2:22.36
100 m butterfly	(Malaysia) Anthony Ang	55.64	(Malaysia) Alex Lim Keng Liat	55.67	(Indonesia) Albert Christiadi Sutanto	55.85
200 m butterfly	(Malaysia) Alex Lim Keng Liat	2:02.90	(Indonesia) Albert Christiadi Sutanto	2:03.67	(Malaysia) Anthony Ang	2:03.92
200 m individual medley	(Indonesia) Felix Christiadi Sutanto	2:06.14	(Thailand) Pathunyu Yimsomruay	2:06.76	(Malaysia) Wan Azlan	2:07.80
400 m individual medley	(Thailand) Ratapong Sirisanont	4:29.87	(Thailand) Pathunyu Yimsomruay	4:30.89	(Indonesia) Albert Christiadi Sutanto	4:32.37
4 × 100 m freestyle relay	Indonesia	3:28.66	Malaysia	3:32.00	Singapore	3:32.13
4 × 200 m freestyle relay	Thailand	7:44.81	Malaysia	7:48.11	Indonesia	7:48.97
4 × 100 m medley relay	Malaysia	3:48.33	Thailand	3:51.48	Indonesia	3:51.89

Women's events

Event	Gold		Silver		Bronze	
50 m freestyle	(Singapore) Joscelin Yeo Wei Ling	27.27	(Myanmar) Moe Thu Aung	27.46	(Philippines) Kathy Echiverri	27.73
100 m freestyle	(Singapore) Joscelin Yeo Wei Ling	57.89	(Indonesia) Catherine Surya	58.92	(Thailand) Ravee Intaporn-udom	59.15
200 m freestyle	(Thailand) Ravee Intaporn-udom	2:05.33	(Indonesia) Meitri Widya Pangestika	2:07.63	(Indonesia) Catherine Surya	2:08.08
400 m freestyle	(Thailand) Ravee Intaporn-udom	4:20.95	(Thailand) Ruthai Santadvathana	4:26.06	(Singapore) Christel Bouvron	4:27.47
800 m freestyle	(Thailand) Ravee Intaporn-udom	8:56.88	(Thailand) Ruthai Santadvathana	9:08.49	(Malaysia) Teo Mui Nyee	9:12.59
100 m backstroke	(Thailand) Chonlathorn Vorathamrong	1:05.78	(Indonesia) Silvy Triana	1:06.06	(Philippines) Kathy Echiverri	1:06.58
200 m backstroke	(Thailand) Chonlathorn Vorathamrong	2:20.22	(Indonesia) Silvy Triana	2:21.64	(Thailand) Praphalsai Minpraphal	2:24.08
100 m breaststroke	(Indonesia) Rita Mariani	1:11.96	(Philippines) Kathy Echiverri	1:13.91	(Singapore) Joscelin Yeo Wei Ling	1:14.67
200 m breaststroke	(Indonesia) Rita Mariani	2:33.34	(Singapore) May Ooi	2:39.45	(Singapore) Daphne Teo Zhi Mei	2:39.72
100 m butterfly	(Indonesia) Catherine Surya	1:02.40	(Thailand) Praphalsai Minpraphal	1:03.30	(Indonesia) Elsa Manora	1:03.33
200 m butterfly	(Indonesia) Catherine Surya	2:15.17	(Thailand) Duangruthai Thammaphanya	2:18.76	(Singapore) Christel Bouvron	2:19.14
200 m individual medley	(Singapore) Joscelin Yeo	2:19.23	(Thailand) Ravee Intaporn-udom	2:19.70	(Singapore) May Ooi	2:22.34
400 m individual medley	(Thailand) Ravee Intaporn-udom	4:53.30	(Malaysia) Sia Wai Yen	5:02.66	(Indonesia) Rita Mariani	5:05.97
4 × 100 m freestyle relay	Indonesia	3:56.54	Singapore	3:58.14	Thailand	3:58.20
4 × 200 m freestyle relay	Thailand	8:29.89	Indonesia	8:32.86	Singapore	8:53.19
4 × 100 m medley relay	Indonesia	4:19.23	Thailand	4:24.44	Singapore	4:25.41

=== Diving ===
Event	Gold		Silver		Bronze	
Men's 3 m springboard	(Thailand) Suchat Pichi	477.25	(Indonesia) Husaini Noor	467.16	(Indonesia) Temmy Kusumah	443.52
Men's 10 m platform	(Thailand) Suchat Pichi	619.00	(Indonesia) Husaini Noor	556.75	(Malaysia) Yeoh Ken Nee	535.95
Women's 3 m springboard	(Thailand) Sukrutai Tommaoros	650.79	(Indonesia) Nani Suryani Wulansari	640.71	(Indonesia) Eka Purnama Indah	634.17
Women's 10 m platform	(Thailand) Sukrutai Tommaoros	465.48	(Indonesia) Shenny Ratna Amelia	462.27	(Indonesia) Nani Suryani Wulansari	441.93

=== Synchronized swimming ===
Event	Gold		Silver		Bronze	
Women's solo	(Malaysia) Jacqueline Chan	151.670	(Indonesia) Titisari Tyas	148.494	(Indonesia) Lenny Puspita	141.684
Women's duet	Indonesia Titisari Tyas; Lenny Puspita	78.932	Malaysia Jacqueline Chan; Jessie Wong	76.397	Thailand Pongsarak; Roysuwan	57.997

=== Water polo ===
Event	Gold	Silver	Bronze
Men's team	Singapore	Indonesia	Philippines
