= Swimming at the 1996 Summer Olympics – Men's 4 × 100 metre medley relay =

Men's 4 × 100 metre medley relay at the Games of the XXVI Olympiad
- Venue: Georgia Tech Aquatic Center
- Date: July 26, 1996 (heats & final)
- Competitors: 112 from 25 nations
- Teams: 25
- Winning time: 3:34.84 WR

Medalists
1st place, gold medalist(s)		Jeff Rouse, Jeremy Linn, Mark Henderson, Gary Hall, Jr., Josh Davis*, Kurt Grote*, John Hargis*, Tripp Schwenk*	United States
2nd place, silver medalist(s)		Vladimir Selkov, Stanislav Lopukhov, Denis Pankratov, Alexander Popov, Roman Ivanovsky*, Vladislav Kulikov*, Roman Yegorov*	Russia
3rd place, bronze medalist(s)		Steven Dewick, Phil Rogers, Scott Miller, Michael Klim, Toby Haenen*; *Indicates the swimmer only competed in the preliminary heats.	Australia

The men's 4 × 100 metre medley relay event at the 1996 Summer Olympics took place on 26 July at the Georgia Tech Aquatic Center in Atlanta, United States.

== Records ==
Prior to this competition, the existing world and Olympic records were as follows.

World record	United States (USA); Jeff Rouse (53.86); Nelson Diebel (1:01.45); Pablo Morales (52.83); Jon Olsen (48.79)	3:36.93	Barcelona, Spain	31 July 1992
Olympic record	United States; Jeff Rouse (53.86); Nelson Diebel (1:01.45); Pablo Morales (52.83); Jon Olsen (48.79)	3:36.93	Barcelona, Spain	31 July 1992

The following new world and Olympic records were set during this competition.

Date	Event	Name	Nationality	Time	Record
26 July	Final	Jeff Rouse (53.95); Jeremy Linn (1:00.32); Mark Henderson (52.39); Gary Hall, Jr. (48.18)	United States	3:34.84	WR

== Results ==
=== Heats ===
Rule: The eight fastest teams advance to the final (Q).

Rank	Heat	Lane	Nation	Swimmers	Time	Notes
1	4	4	United States	Tripp Schwenk (55.54); Kurt Grote (1:01.65); John Hargis (53.34); Josh Davis (49.40)	3:39.93	Q
2	4	5	Hungary	Tamás Deutsch (56.51); Károly Güttler (1:01.55); Péter Horváth (53.03); Attila Zubor (49.96)	3:41.05	Q, NR
3	3	5	Germany	Stev Theloke (56.23); Mark Warnecke (1:01.89); Oliver Lampe (53.67); Bengt Zikarsky (49.31)	3:41.10	Q
4	2	4	Australia	Toby Haenen (56.92); Phil Rogers (1:02.21); Scott Miller (52.30); Michael Klim (49.87)	3:41.30	Q
5	3	4	Russia	Alexander Popov (55.71); Roman Ivanovsky (1:02.19); Vladislav Kulikov (53.72); Roman Yegorov (49.87)	3:41.49	Q
6	3	3	Poland	Mariusz Siembida (55.83) NR; Marek Krawczyk (1:02.55); Rafał Szukała (53.54); Bartosz Kizierowski (49.80)	3:41.72	Q, NR
7	2	5	Japan	Keitaro Konnai (55.64); Akira Hayashi (1:01.71); Takashi Yamamoto (53.82); Shunsuke Ito (50.61)	3:41.78	Q
8	3	2	Israel	Eithan Urbach (56.82); Vadim Alexeev (1:02.15); Dan Kutler (54.28); Yoav Bruck (48.99)	3:42.24	Q, NR
9	1	5	Ukraine	Volodymyr Nikolaychuk (56.96); Oleksandr Dzhaburiya (1:02.74); Denys Sylantyev (53.29); Pavlo Khnykin (49.30)	3:42.29	NR
10	4	7	Netherlands	Martin van der Spoel (57.15); Benno Kuipers (1:02.29); Stefan Aartsen (54.00); Pieter van den Hoogenband (48.98)	3:42.42	
11	2	3	France	Franck Schott (56.08); Vladimir Latocha (1:02.92); Franck Esposito (53.75); Nicolas Gruson (50.19)	3:42.94	
12	4	6	Canada	Robert Braknis (56.82); Jonathan Cleveland (1:02.66); Edward Parenti (53.83); Stephan Clarke (49.64)	3:42.95	
13	4	2	China	Zhao Yi (57.84); Zeng Qiliang (1:01.75); Jiang Chengji (53.22); Zhao Lifeng (50.69)	3:43.50	
14	3	6	New Zealand	Jonathan Winter (57.05); Paul Kent (1:03.10); Danyon Loader (55.20); Trent Bray (50.45)	3:45.80	
15	1	4	Kazakhstan	Sergey Ushkalov (58.41); Aleksandr Savitsky (1:06.45); Andrey Gavrilov (54.05); Aleksey Yegorov (50.60)	3:49.51	
16	3	7	Croatia	Tomislav Karlo (57.32); Krešimir Čač (1:06.02); Miloš Milošević (54.66); Miroslav Vučetić (52.09)	3:50.09	
17	3	1	South Korea	Kim Min-suk (58.75); Cho Kwang-jea (1:02.19); Yang Dae-chul (57.73); Koh Yun-ho (52.17)	3:50.84	
18	2	7	Lithuania	Darius Grigalionis (56.66); Nerijus Beiga (1:04.55); Mindaugas Bružas (57.48); Raimundas Mažuolis (52.62)	3:51.31	
19	2	1	Puerto Rico	Carlos Bodega (1:02.33); Todd Torres (1:03.50); Ricardo Busquets (54.45); José González (51.76)	3:52.04	
20	1	3	Malaysia	Alex Lim (58.48); Elvin Chia (1:04.42); Anthony Ang (55.23); Wan Azlan Abdullah (54.45)	3:52.58	
21	2	8	Kyrgyzstan	Konstantin Priahin (1:00.25); Yevgeny Petrashov (1:07.43); Konstantin Andriushin (57.63); Sergey Ashihmin (50.93)	3:56.24	
22	4	1	Thailand	Dulyarit Phuangthong (59.13); Ratapong Sirisanont (1:04.60); Niti Intharapichai (58.32); Torlarp Sethsothorn (54.75)	3:56.80	
23	3	8	Singapore	Gerald Koh (1:00.99); Desmond Koh (1:07.07); Thum Ping Tjin (57.83); Sng Ju Wei (53.62)	3:59.51	
	4	8	Portugal	Nuno Laurentino (58.02); José Couto (1:03.53); Miguel Cabrita (56.53); Miguel Machado (52.37)	DSQ	
	4	3	Great Britain	Neil Willey (55.99); Richard Maden (1:01.92); James Hickman (52.69); Nicholas Shackell	DSQ	

=== Final ===
Rank	Lane	Nation	Swimmers	Time	Notes
1st place, gold medalist(s)	4	United States	Jeff Rouse (53.95); Jeremy Linn (1:00.32); Mark Henderson (52.39); Gary Hall, Jr. (48.18)	3:34.84	WR
2nd place, silver medalist(s)	2	Russia	Vladimir Selkov (55.53); Stanislav Lopukhov (1:01.66); Denis Pankratov (51.55); Alexander Popov (48.81)	3:37.55	EU
3rd place, bronze medalist(s)	6	Australia	Steven Dewick (56.65); Phil Rogers (1:01.71); Scott Miller (52.04); Michael Klim (49.16)	3:39.56	OC
4	3	Germany	Ralf Braun (55.76); Mark Warnecke (1:01.40); Christian Keller (53.15); Björn Zikarsky (49.33)	3:39.64	
5	1	Japan	Keitaro Konnai (55.70); Akira Hayashi (1:01.46); Takashi Yamamoto (53.28); Shunsuke Ito (50.07)	3:40.51	AS
6	5	Hungary	Tamás Deutsch (56.54); Károly Güttler (1:01.41); Péter Horváth (53.25); Attila Czene (49.64)	3:40.84	NR
7	7	Poland	Mariusz Siembida (55.82); Marek Krawczyk (1:02.71); Rafał Szukała (53.29); Bartosz Kizierowski (50.12)	3:41.94	
8	8	Israel	Eithan Urbach (56.79); Vadim Alexeev (1:02.18); Dan Kutler (54.32); Yoav Bruck (49.61)	3:42.90	
