= Malaysia at the 1995 SEA Games =

Malaysia at the 1995 Southeast Asian Games
- IOC code: MAS
- NOC: Olympic Council of Malaysia
- Website: www.olympic.org.my (in English)

in Chiang Mai
- Competitors: 480 in 11 sports
- Medals Ranked 4th: Gold 31 Silver 49 Bronze 69 Total 149

Southeast Asian Games appearances (overview)
- 1959; 1961; 1965; 1967; 1969; 1971; 1973; 1975; 1977; 1979; 1981; 1983; 1985; 1987; 1989; 1991; 1993; 1995; 1997; 1999; 2001; 2003; 2005; 2007; 2009; 2011; 2013; 2015; 2017; 2019; 2021; 2023; 2025; 2027; 2029

Malaysia competed in the 1995 Southeast Asian Games held in Chiang Mai, Thailand from 9 to 17 December 1995.

== Medal summary ==
=== Medals by sport ===
Sport	Gold	Silver	Bronze	Total	Rank
Archery	0	1	0	1	4
Athletics	7	0	0	7	
Badminton	1	1	4	6	2
Basketball	0	0	1	1	3
Football	0	1	0	1	2
Swimming	2	2	2	6	4
Total	31	49	69	149	4

=== Medallists ===
Medal	Name	Sport	Event
Gold	Munusamy Ramachandran	Athletics	Men's 5000 metres
Gold	Munusamy Ramachandran	Athletics	Men's 10,000 metres
Gold	Nur Herman Majid	Athletics	Men's 110 metres hurdles
Gold	Loo Kum Zee	Athletics	Men's high jump
Gold	Mohamed Yazid Imran	Athletics	Men's javelin throw
Gold	Rajoo Morgan	Athletics	Men's 10,000 metres track walk
Gold	Anastasia Karen Silvaraj	Athletics	Women's 5000 metres track walk
Gold	Cheah Soon Kit; Yap Kim Hock	Badminton	Men's doubles
Gold	Anthony Ang	Swimming	Men's 100 metre butterfly
Gold	Anthony Ang	Swimming	Men's 200 metre butterfly
Silver	Nor Resah Ab Rasiad; Wan Nornidawati; Siti Aisah Sudin	Archery	Women's team recurve
Silver	Malaysia national badminton team	Badminton	Men's team
Silver	Malaysia women's national football team	Football	Women's tournament
Silver	Elvin Chia	Swimming	Men's 200 metre breaststroke
Silver	Alex Lim; Anthony Ang; Elvin Chia; Wan Azlan Abdullah	Swimming	Men's 4 × 100 metre medley relay
Bronze	Ong Ewe Hock	Badminton	Men's singles
Bronze	Rashid Sidek	Badminton	Men's singles
Bronze	Roslin Hashim; Chor Hooi Yee	Badminton	Mixed doubles
Bronze	Malaysia national badminton team	Badminton	Women's team
Bronze	Malaysia national basketball team	Basketball	Men's tournament
Bronze		Sepak takraw	
Bronze	Elvin Chia	Swimming	Men's 100 metre breaststroke
Bronze	Wan Azlan Abdullah	Swimming	Men's 400 metre individual medley

== Football ==
=== Men's tournament ===
Group A

Team	Pld	W	D	L	GF	GA	GD	Pts
Thailand	4	3	1	0	14	2	+10	10
Vietnam	4	3	0	1	8	3	+5	9
Indonesia	4	2	0	2	14	3	+11	6
Malaysia	4	1	1	2	9	5	+4	4
Cambodia	4	0	0	4	0	32	−32	0

4 December 1995

Vietnam	2 – 0	Malaysia
Huynh Quoc Cuong Vo Hoang Buu

6 December 1995

Thailand	0 – 0	Malaysia

8 December 1995

Indonesia	3 – 0	Malaysia

10 December 1995

Malaysia	9 – 0	Cambodia

=== Women's tournament ===
Group stage

Team	Pld	W	D	L	GF	GA	GD	Pts
Thailand	4	3	1	0	15	3	+12	10
Malaysia	4	2	1	1	7	4	+3	7
Myanmar	4	1	2	1	8	9	−1	5
Philippines	4	1	2	1	3	9	−6	5
Singapore	4	0	0	4	1	9	−8	0

3 December 1995

Thailand	1 – 0	Malaysia

7 December 1995

Malaysia	5 – 3	Myanmar

9 December 1995

Malaysia	2 – 0	Singapore

11 December 1995

Malaysia	0 – 0	Philippines

Gold medal match

13 December 1995

Thailand	1 – 0	Malaysia
