= Malaysia at the 2000 Summer Olympics =

- IOC code: MAS
- NOC: Olympic Council of Malaysia
- Website: www.olympic.org.my (in English)

in Sydney
- Competitors: 40 in 9 sports
- Flag bearer: Mirnawan Nawawi
- Medals: Gold 0 Silver 0 Bronze 0 Total 0

Summer Olympics appearances (overview)
- 1956; 1960; 1964; 1968; 1972; 1976; 1980; 1984; 1988; 1992; 1996; 2000; 2004; 2008; 2012; 2016; 2020; 2024; 2028

Other related appearances
- North Borneo (1956)

Malaysia competed at the 2000 Summer Olympics in Sydney, Australia.

== Athletics ==
Key

- Note–Ranks given for track events are within the athlete's heat only
- Q = Qualified for the next round
- q = Qualified for the next round as a fastest loser or, in field events, by position without achieving the qualifying target
- NR = National record
- N/A = Round not applicable for the event
- Bye = Athlete not required to compete in round

Men
Track event

Athlete	Event	Heat		Quarterfinal		Semifinal		Final	
Athlete	Event	Result	Rank	Result	Rank	Result	Rank	Result	Rank
Watson Nyambek	100 m	10.61	62	Did not advance					

Women
Road event

Athlete	Event	Heat		Quarterfinal		Semifinal		Final	
Athlete	Event	Result	Rank	Result	Rank	Result	Rank	Result	Rank
Yuan Yufang	20 km walk	—N/a						1:34:19	15

== Badminton ==
Athlete	Event	Round of 64	Round of 32	Round of 16	Quarterfinal	Semifinal	Final	Rank
Athlete	Event	Opposition Score	Opposition Score	Opposition Score	Opposition Score	Opposition Score	Opposition Score	Rank
Ong Ewe Hock	Men's singles	Bye	Peter Knowles (GBR); W 15–3, 12–15, 15–5	Taufik Hidayat (INA); L 9–15, 15–13, 3–15	Did not advance			
Wong Choong Hann	Men's singles	Bye	Jyri Aalto (FIN); W 15–5, 15–12	Kenneth Jonassen (DEN); W 15–6, 15–7	Xia Xuanze (CHN); L 15–17, 11–15	Did not advance		
Cheah Soon Kit; Yap Kim Hock	Men's doubles	—N/a	Chen Qiqiu; Yu Jinhao (CHN); W 4–15, 17–16, 15–10	Ha Tae-kwon; Kim Dong-moon (KOR); L 5–15, 3–15	Did not advance			
Choong Tan Fook; Lee Wan Wah	Men's doubles	—N/a	Bye	Tesana Panvisvas; Pramote Teerawiwatana (THA); W 11–15, 17–15, 15–9	Eng Hian; Flandy Limpele (INA); W 15–10, 15–9	Lee Dong-soo; Yoo Yong-sung (KOR); L 12–15, 15–7, 4–15	Bronze medal match Ha Tae-kwon; Kim Dong-moon (KOR); L 2–15, 8–15	4

== Diving ==
Men

Athlete	Event	Preliminaries		Semifinals		Final	
Athlete	Event	Points	Rank	Points	Rank	Points	Rank
Yeoh Ken Nee	3 m springboard	364.38	22	Did not advance			
Mohamed Azreen Bahari	10 m platform	342.24	25	Did not advance			
Yeoh Ken Nee	10 m platform	361.86	24	Did not advance			

Women

Athlete	Event	Preliminaries		Semifinals		Final	
Athlete	Event	Points	Rank	Points	Rank	Points	Rank
Leong Mun Yee	3 m springboard	186.51	39	Did not advance			
Leong Mun Yee	10 m platform	227.28	34	Did not advance			

== Gymnastics ==
=== Artistic ===
Women

Athlete	Event	Apparatus				Total	Rank
Athlete	Event	F Rank	V Rank	UB Rank	BB Rank	Total	Rank
Au Li Yen	Qualification	—N/a		6.525; 84	—N/a	6.525	97

== Hockey ==
=== Men's tournament ===
Team roster

- Jamaluddin Roslan
- Maninderjit Singh Magmar
- Chua Boon Huat
- Krishnamurthy Gobinathan
- Kuhan Shanmuganathan
- Nor Azlan Bakar
- Chairil Anwar Abdul Aziz
- Mohan Jiwa
- Mohamed Madzli Ikmar
- Ibrahim Suhaimi
- Nor Saiful Zaini Nasiruddin
- Keevan Raj
- Mirnawan Nawawi
- Calvin Fernandez
- Saiful Azli Abdul Rahman
- Mohamed Nasihin Nubil Ibrahim

Pool A

Team	Pld	W	D	L	GF	GA	Pts
Pakistan	5	2	3	0	15	6	9
Netherlands	5	2	2	1	11	8	8
Germany	5	2	2	1	7	6	8
Great Britain	5	1	2	2	8	16	5
Malaysia	5	0	4	1	5	6	4
Canada	5	0	3	2	7	11	3

Advanced to semifinals

16 September 2000
20:30

Malaysia	0 – 1	Germany
	Report	Emmerling 43'

Umpires:
Eduardo Ruiz (ARG)
Henrik Ehlers (DEN)

18 September 2000
10:30

Netherlands	0 – 0	Malaysia
	Report

Umpires:
Henrik Ehlers (DEN)
John Wright (RSA)

20 September 2000
15:30

Malaysia	2 – 2	Great Britain
Nor Saiful 59'; Keevan 66'	Report	Parnham 18'; Pearn 27'

Umpires:
Eduardo Ruiz (ARG)
Donald Prior (AUS)

23 September 2000
13:30

Malaysia	2 – 2	Pakistan
Suhaimi 21', 63'	Report	Bashir 24'; Abbas 70+'

Umpires:
Murray Grime (AUS)
Ray O'Connor (IRL)

26 September 2000
10:30

Malaysia	1 – 1	Canada
Anwar 59'	Report	Milkovich 27'

Umpires:
Jason McCracken (NZL)
Eduardo Ruiz (ARG)

Ninth to twelfth place classification

27 September 2000
20:30

Malaysia	0 – 1	Spain
	Report	Amat 62'

Umpires:
Steven Horgan (USA)
John Wright (RSA)

Eleventh and twelfth place match

30 September 2000
11:30

Malaysia	3 – 2 (a.e.t.)	Poland
Mirnawan 5'; Nor Saiful 48'; Kuhan 73'	Report	L. Wybieralski 17'; Jakubiak 52'

Umpires:
Henrik Ehlers (DEN)
Murray Grime (AUS)

Ranked 11th in final standings

== Sailing ==
Open

Athlete	Event	Race											Net points	Final rank
Athlete	Event	1	2	3	4	5	6	7	8	9	10	11	Net points	Final rank
Kevin Lim	Laser	~~30~~	~~31~~	14	14	16	16	13	29	18	23	2	145	22

== Shooting ==
Women

Athlete	Event	Qualification		Final	
Athlete	Event	Points	Rank	Points	Rank
Irina Maharani	10 m air pistol	373	32	Did not advance	
Irina Maharani	25 m pistol	564	36	Did not advance	

== Swimming ==
Men

Athlete	Events	Heat		Semifinal		Final	
Athlete	Events	Time	Rank	Time	Rank	Time	Rank
Allen Ong	100 m freestyle	51.93	40	Did not advance			
Allen Ong	200 m freestyle	1:54.53	37	Did not advance			
Dieung Manggang	400 m freestyle	4:03.77	43	—N/a		Did not advance	
Dieung Manggang	1500 m freestyle	16:02.11	36	—N/a		Did not advance	
Alex Lim	100 m backstroke	56.81	27	Did not advance			
Alex Lim	200 m backstroke	2:08.23	42	Did not advance			
Elvin Chia	100 m breaststroke	1:02.81	19	Did not advance			
Elvin Chia	200 m breaststroke	2:26.84	44	Did not advance			
Anthony Ang	100 m butterfly	55.26	36	Did not advance			
Anthony Ang	200 m butterfly	2:00.12	22	Did not advance			
Wan Azlan Abdullah	400 m individual medley	4:36.90	41	—N/a		Did not advance	
Alex Lim; Allen Ong; Anthony Ang; Elvin Chia	4 × 100 m medley relay	3:48.32	22	—N/a		Did not advance	

Women

Athlete	Events	Heat		Semifinal		Final	
Athlete	Events	Time	Rank	Time	Rank	Time	Rank
Marilyn Chua	50 m freestyle	27.66	52	Did not advance			
Siow Yi Ting	100 m breaststroke	1:13.92	32	Did not advance			
Siow Yi Ting	200 m breaststroke	2:34.52	27	Did not advance			
Sia Wai Yen	200 m individual medley	2:23.31	31	Did not advance			
Sia Wai Yen	400 m individual medley	4:59.18	25	—N/a		Did not advance	

== Taekwondo ==
Women

Athlete	Event	Preliminary round	Quarterfinals	Semifinals	Final	
Athlete	Event	Opposition Result	Opposition Result	Opposition Result	Opposition Result	Rank
Lee Wan Yuen	Heavyweight	Myriam Baverel (FRA); L 4–8	Did not advance			
