= Aquatics at the 2001 SEA Games =

Aquatics at the 2001 Southeast Asian Games included swimming, Synchronized swimming, diving and water polo events. The three sports of aquatics were held in Kuala Lumpur, Malaysia. Aquatics events was held between 10 September to 18 September.

== Swimming ==
Men's events

Event	Gold		Silver		Bronze	
50 m freestyle	(Indonesia) Richard Sam Bera	23.03	(Thailand) Arwut Chinapasaen	23.36	(Malaysia) Allen Ong Hou Ming	23.55
100 m freestyle	(Indonesia) Richard Sam Bera	51.03	(Malaysia) Allen Ong Hou Ming	51.31	(Singapore) Mark Chay Jung Jun	51.76
200 m freestyle	(Singapore) Mark Chay Jung Jun	1:52.67	(Thailand) Dulyarit Phuangthong	1:52.87	(Singapore) Sng Ju Wei	1:54.33
400 m freestyle	(Thailand) Torwai Sethsothorn	3:58.18	(Philippines) Miguel Mendoza	3:59.75	(Malaysia) Dieung Anak Manggang	4:00.12
1500 m freestyle	(Thailand) Torwai Sethsothorn	15:49.72	(Philippines) Miguel Mendoza	15:54.00	(Malaysia) Dieung Anak Manggang	15:55.73
100 m backstroke	(Malaysia) Alex Lim	56.16	(Thailand) Dulyarit Phuangthong	57.71	(Singapore) Gary Tan	57.89
200 m backstroke	(Malaysia) Alex Lim Keng Liat	2:02.91	(Singapore) Gary Tan	2:06.10	(Singapore) Gerald Koh	2:07.01
100 m breaststroke	(Malaysia) Elvin Chia	1:03.15	(Vietnam) Tran Xian Hien	1:04.94	(Indonesia) Muhammad Akbar Nasution	1:06.04
200 m breaststroke	(Malaysia) Elvin Chia Tshun Thau	2:18.40	(Indonesia) Muhammad Akbar Nasution	2:22.82	(Vietnam) Tran Xian Hien	2:23.48
100 m butterfly	(Malaysia) Anthony Ang	55.40	(Malaysia) Allen Ong Hou Ming	55.72	(Singapore) Gan Wei Ming	56.38
200 m butterfly	(Malaysia) Anthony Ang	2:01.84	(Singapore) Gan Wei Ming	2:05.14	(Malaysia) Dieung Manggang	2:05.70
200 m individual medley	(Thailand) Dulyarit Phuangthong	2:05.75	(Philippines) Miguel Molina	2:06.25	(Thailand) Phatunyu Yinsomruay	2:07.38
400 m individual medley	(Thailand) Torwai Sethsothorn	4:29.43	(Philippines) Juan Carlo Piccio	4:30.31	(Thailand) Phatunyu Yinsomruay	4:32.29
4 × 100 m freestyle relay	Singapore	3:27.49	Indonesia	3:31.01	Thailand	3:39.38
4 × 200 m freestyle relay	Singapore	7:38.82	Thailand	7:39.76	Philippines	7:41.17
4 × 100 m medley relay	Malaysia	3:46.29	Singapore	3:51.36	Indonesia	3:52.91

Women's events

Event	Gold		Silver		Bronze	
50 m freestyle	(Myanmar) Moe Thu Aung	26.34	(Singapore) Joscelin Yeo Wei Ling	26.41	(Singapore) Jacqueline Lim Kim Tor	26.79
100 m freestyle	(Singapore) Joscelin Yeo Wei Ling	57.13	(Myanmar) Moe Thu Aung	57.61	(Thailand) Pilin Tachakittiranan	58.69
200 m freestyle	(Thailand) Pilin Tachakittiranan	2:04.70	(Thailand) Chorkaew Choompol	2:05.98	(Indonesia) Siripiya Sutanto	2:07.24
400 m freestyle	(Thailand) Ravee Intporn-Udom	4:24.53	(Thailand) Pilin Tachakittiranan	4:24.73	(Malaysia) Sia Wai Yen	4:24.87
800 m freestyle	(Thailand) Ravee Intporn-Udom	9:02.84	(Malaysia) Sia Wai Yen	9:03.00	(Thailand) Pornrada Srisawat	9:10.96
100 m backstroke	(Thailand) Chonlathorn Vorathamrong	1:03.93	(Philippines) Maria Lizza Danila	1:05.10	(Thailand) Chorkaew Choompol	1:07.34
200 m backstroke	(Thailand) Chonlathorn Vorathamrong	2:19.82	(Philippines) Maria Lizza Danila	2:23.47	(Malaysia) Sia Wai Yen	2:23.87
100 m breaststroke	(Singapore) Nicholette Teo Wei Min	1:12.64	(Philippines) Jenny Rose Guerero	1:12.91	(Malaysia) Siow Yi Ting	1:13.69
200 m breaststroke	(Malaysia) Siow Yi Ting	2:31.90	(Singapore) Nicholette Teo Wei Min	2:35.01	(Philippines) Jenny Rose Guerero	2:36.05
100 m butterfly	(Singapore) Joscelin Yeo Wei Ling	1:01.16	(Myanmar) Moe Thu Aung	1:01.76	(Thailand) Pilin Tachakittiranan	1:03.69
200 m butterfly	(Singapore) Christel Bouvron Mei Yen	2:17.37	(Thailand) Pilin Tachakittiranan	2:19.62	(Thailand) Tachaphorn Iamsanitamorn	2:20.64
200 m individual medley	(Singapore) Joscelin Yeo Wei Ling	2:19.76	(Malaysia) Siow Yi Ting	2:21.80	(Malaysia) Sia Wai Yen	2:22.44
400 m individual medley	(Malaysia) Sia Wai Yen	4:55.87	(Thailand) Ravee Intporn-Udom	5:03.00	(Philippines) Jenny Rose Guerero	5:08.09
4 × 100 m freestyle relay	Thailand	3:54.11	Singapore	3:54.75	Malaysia	4:03.38
4 × 200 m freestyle relay	Thailand	8:32.07	Singapore	8:38.73	Malaysia	8:45.14
4 × 100 m medley relay	Thailand	4:22.01	Singapore	4:23.41	Philippines	4:23.74
