= Aquatics at the 1995 SEA Games =

Aquatics at the 1995 Southeast Asian Games included swimming, diving and water polo events and were held at Aquatic Centre in 700th Anniversary Sport Complex, Chiang Mai, Thailand. Aquatics events was held between 10 December to 15 December.

== Medal winners ==
=== Swimming ===
Men's events

Event	Gold		Silver		Bronze	
50 m freestyle	(Indonesia) Richard Sam Bera	23.42	(Indonesia) Wisnu Wardhana	24.21	(Singapore) Ernest Teo Guee Lim	24.21
100 m freestyle	(Indonesia) Richard Sam Bera	52.11	(Indonesia) Wisnu Wardhana	52.98	(Thailand) Padhanaseth Changkasiri	53.21
200 m freestyle	(Thailand) Torlarp Sethsothorn	1:53.92	(Philippines) Raymond Papa	1:54.66	(Thailand) Vicha Ratanachote	1:55.09
400 m freestyle	(Thailand) Torlarp Sethsothorn	3:57.43	(Thailand) Vicha Ratanachote		(Indonesia) Albert Sutanto	
1500 m freestyle	(Thailand) Torlarp Sethsothorn	15:43.27	(Thailand) Asawin Okada	16:05.46	(Indonesia) Albert Sutanto	16:39.89
100 m backstroke	(Philippines) Raymond Papa	58.03	(Thailand) Dulyarit Phuangthong	58.81	(Singapore) Gerald Koh	59.76
200 m backstroke	(Philippines) Raymond Papa	2:03.79	(Thailand) Dulyarit Phuangthong	2:06.49	(Singapore) Gerald Koh	2:07.69
100 m breaststroke	(Thailand) Ratapong Sirisanont	1:04.37	(Singapore) Desmond Koh	1:05.59	(Malaysia) Elvin Chia Tshun Thau	1:06.64
200 m breaststroke	(Thailand) Ratapong Sirisanont	2:16.54	(Malaysia) Elvin Chia Tshun Thau	2:23.70	(Indonesia) Audi Octavian	2:24.92
100 m butterfly	(Malaysia) Anthony Ang	55.83	(Indonesia) Wisnu Wàrdhana	57.39	(Thailand) Nuttapol Chavanavanichwoot	57.49
200 m butterfly	(Malaysia) Anthony Ang	2:05.34	(Thailand) Niti Intharapichai	2:05.74	(Singapore) Thum Ping Tjin	2:06.26
200 m individual medley	(Thailand) Ratapong Sirisanont	2:04.74	(Singapore) Desmond Koh	2:07.80	(Thailand) Dulyarit Phuangthong	2:08.44
400 m individual medley	(Thailand) Ratapong Sirisanont	4:27.91	(Singapore) Desmond Koh	4:31.84	(Malaysia) Wan Azlan Wan Abdullah	4:33.86
4 × 100 m freestyle relay	Indonesia Albert Sutanto; Felix Sutanto; Richard Sam Bera; Wisnu Wardhana	3:31.03	Thailand Pawin Kohvathana; Padhanaseth Changkasiri; Kittibhund Paomahanaka; Vicha Ratanachote	3:31.29	Singapore Thum Ping Tjin; Ernest Teo Guee Lim; Peter Weng Weong; Sng Ju Wei	
4 × 200 m freestyle relay	Thailand Vicha Ratanachote; Dulyarit Phuangthong; Ratapong Sirisanont; Torlarp Sethsothorn	7:39.39	Singapore Thum Ping Tjin; Sng Ju Wei; Gerald Koh; Desmond Koh	7:50.91	Indonesia Albert Sutanto; Wisnu; Felix Sutanto; Richard Sam Bera	7:50.91
4 × 100 m medley relay	Thailand Dulyarit Phuangthong; Ratapong Sirisanont; Nuttapol Chavanavanichwoot; Padhanaseth Changkasiri	3:51.60	Malaysia Alex Lim; Anthony Ang; Elvin Chia; Wan Azlan Abdullah	3:55.72	Singapore Gerald Koh; Desmond Koh; Thum Ping Tjin; Ju Wei	3:56.17

Women's events

Event	Gold		Silver		Bronze	
50 m freestyle	(Singapore) Joscelin Yeo	26.73	(Thailand) Donhatai Rongsawat	27.49	(Indonesia) Meitri Widya	27.76
100 m freestyle	(Singapore) Joscelin Yeo	57.27	(Indonesia) Meitri Widya	59.19	(Indonesia) Elsa Manora	59.72
200 m freestyle	(Singapore) Joscelin Yeo	2:04.01	(Thailand) Ravee Intapornudom	2:05.99	(Thailand) Nusra Chinnaphasaen	2:06.43
400 m freestyle	(Singapore) Joscelin Yeo	4:23.05	(Thailand) Ravee Intapornudom	4:23.29	(Thailand) Hataikan Leelakitichok	4:27.90
800 m freestyle	(Thailand) Ravee Intapornudom	9:04.32	(Thailand) Hataikan Leelakitichok	9:11.51	(Indonesia) Susanti	9:35.93
100 m backstroke	(Thailand) Praphalsai Minpraphal	1:04.87	(Indonesia) Elsa Manora	1:05.97	(Singapore) Tang Cheryl	1:07.57
200 m backstroke	(Thailand) Praphalsai Minpraphal	2:19.02	(Indonesia) Elsa Manora	2:23.68	(Thailand) Chonthon Voratamrong	2:25.51
100 m breaststroke	(Singapore) Joscelin Yeo	1:11.37	(Thailand) Songporn Leelakitichock	1:14.68	(Thailand) Rasnin Sittart	1:15.12
200 m breaststroke	(Thailand) Rapeeporn Wongsiriroj	2:40.55	(Indonesia) Rita	2:41.37	(Thailand) Monthakan Khamphiw	2:41.75
100 m butterfly	(Singapore) Joscelin Yeo	1:01.59	(Indonesia) Elsa Manora	1:02.85	(Thailand) Nusra Chinnaphasaen	1:02.98
200 m butterfly	(Thailand) Praphalsai Minpraphal	2:15.60	(Thailand) Nusra Chinnaphasaen	2:16.30	(Indonesia) Catherine	2:19.62
200 m individual medley	(Singapore) Joscelin Yeo	2:17.87	(Thailand) Praphalsai Minpraphal	2:19.88	(Indonesia) Elsa Manora	2:23.82
400 m individual medley	(Thailand) Praphalsai Minpraphal	4:54.24	(Thailand) Ravee Intapornudom	5:02.14	(Indonesia) Elsa Manora	5:05.58
4 × 100 m freestyle relay	Thailand Donhatai Rongsawat; Nusra Chinnaphasaen; Praphalsai Minpraphal; Ravee Intapornudom	3:55.99	Singapore May Ooi; Joscelin Yeo; Tang Cheryl; Eadelin	3:57.94	Indonesia Meitri Widya; Catherine; Olga; Elsa Manora	3:59.17
4 × 100 m medley relay	Thailand Praphalsai Minpraphal; Songporn Leelakitichock; Nusra Chinnaphasaen; Ravee Intapornudom	4:22.19	Singapore Tang Cheryl; Joscelin Yeo; May Ooi; Eadelin	4:23.02	Indonesia Elsa Manora; Olga; Catherine; Meitri Widya	4:25.70

=== Diving ===
Event	Gold		Silver		Bronze	
Men's 1 m springboard	(Indonesia) Temmy	375.31	(Thailand) Suchat Pichi	362.14	(Thailand) Anupan Atthainsee	346.20
Men's 3 m springboard	(Thailand) Suchat Pichi	676.80	(Thailand) Anupan Atthainsee	655.47	(Indonesia) Temmy	644.85
Men's 10 m platform	(Thailand) Suchat Pichi	673.95	(Thailand) Bundit Silivong	545.43	(Indonesia) Banriansyah	522.03
Women's 1 m springboard	(Thailand) Sureerat Atthainsee	254.73	(Thailand) Jidapone Srimoung	251.19	(Indonesia) Nani W	242.85
Women's 3 m springboard	(Thailand) Sukrutai Tommaoros	498.27	(Philippines) Jean Elaine	480.48	(Indonesia) Dwi Mariastuti	469.92
Women's 10 m platform	(Thailand) Sukrutai Tommaoros	506.43	(Indonesia) Nani W	449.97	(Indonesia) Dawi Mariastuti	438.24

=== Water polo ===
Event	Gold	Silver	Bronze
Men's team	Singapore	Thailand	Philippines

== See also ==
- List of Southeast Asian Games records in swimming
