= Ravee Intaporn-udom =

Thai swimmer (born 1980)

Personal information
- Born: 14 August 1980 (age 45)

Sport
- Sport: Swimming
Medal record
Representing Thailand
SEA Games
Gold medal – first place	1993 Singapore	400m freestyle
Gold medal – first place	1993 Singapore	800m freestyle
Gold medal – first place	1995 Chiang Mai	800m freestyle
Gold medal – first place	1995 Chiang Mai	4x100m freestyle relay
Gold medal – first place	1995 Chiang Mai	4x100m medley relay
Gold medal – first place	1997 Jakarta	200m freestyle
Gold medal – first place	1997 Jakarta	400m freestyle
Gold medal – first place	1997 Jakarta	800m freestyle
Gold medal – first place	1997 Jakarta	4x200m freestyle relay
Gold medal – first place	1999 Brunei	4x100m freestyle relay
Gold medal – first place	1999 Brunei	4x200m freestyle relay
Gold medal – first place	1999 Brunei	4x100m medley relay
Gold medal – first place	2001 Kuala Lumpur	400m freestyle
Gold medal – first place	2001 Kuala Lumpur	800m freestyle
Gold medal – first place	2001 Kuala Lumpur	4x100m freestyle relay
Gold medal – first place	2001 Kuala Lumpur	4x200m freestyle relay
Gold medal – first place	2001 Kuala Lumpur	4x100m medley relay
Silver medal – second place	1995 Chiang Mai	200m freestyle
Silver medal – second place	1995 Chiang Mai	400m freestyle
Silver medal – second place	1997 Jakarta	200m individual medley
Silver medal – second place	2001 Kuala Lumpur	400m individual medley
Bronze medal – third place	1997 Jakarta	100m freestyle
Bronze medal – third place	1997 Jakarta	4x100m freestyle relay
Bronze medal – third place	1999 Brunei	200m individual medley

Ravee Intaporn-udom (born 14 August 1980) is a Thai swimmer. She represented Thailand at the SEA Games from 1993 to 2001, winning 17 gold medals, and competed twice at the Asian Games and in three events at the 1996 Summer Olympics. She now operates a children's swimming school.
