= Lists of SEA Games medalists =

This article includes lists of all Southeast Asian Games medalists since 1959, organised by each sport or discipline, and also by each edition of the games.

== Medalist with most medals by sport ==
Discipline	Contested	Number of		Medals awarded				Athlete(s) with the most medals (gold-silver-bronze)	Athlete(s) with the most gold medals
Discipline	Contested	Games (up to 2013)	Medal events (at 2013)	1st place, gold medalist(s)	2nd place, silver medalist(s)	3rd place, bronze medalist(s)	Total	Athlete(s) with the most medals (gold-silver-bronze)	Athlete(s) with the most gold medals
Archery	1977–1997; since 2001	18	10						
Swimming (men, women)	Since 1959	27	38					Joscelin Yeo (SIN) (40–12–3)	Joscelin Yeo (SIN) (40–12–3)

== Medalist with most medals by each edition of the Games ==
The following is a list of top medalist athlete in every edition. All of the athletes below competing in swimming competition.

Games	Medal		Host	Number of medal events	Medals awarded				Athlete(s) with the most medals (gold-silver-bronze)	Athlete(s) with the most gold medals
Games	Medal		Host	Number of medal events	1st place, gold medalist(s)	2nd place, silver medalist(s)	3rd place, bronze medalist(s)	Total	Athlete(s) with the most medals (gold-silver-bronze)	Athlete(s) with the most gold medals
1959	winners	table	Bangkok, Thailand	67	67	68	66	201		
1965	winners	table	Kuala Lumpur, Malaysia	102	102	97	106	305	Patricia Chan (SIN) (8)	Patricia Chan (SIN) (8)
1967	winners	table	Bangkok, Thailand	145	145	144	160	449	Patricia Chan (SIN) (10)	Patricia Chan (SIN) (10)
1969	winners	table	(Myanmar) Rangoon, Burma	145	145	146	164	455	Patricia Chan (SIN) (10)	Patricia Chan (SIN) (10)
1991	winners	table	Manila, Philippines	328	328	334	400	1062	Akiko Thomson (PHI) (7)	Akiko Thomson (PHI) (7)
1993	winners	table	Singapore	318	318	315	378	1011	Joscelin Yeo (SIN) (9–1–0)	Joscelin Yeo (SIN) (9–1–0)
1995	winners	table	Chiang Mai, Thailand	338	338	330	414	1082	Joscelin Yeo (SIN) (7–2–0)	Joscelin Yeo (SIN) (7–2–0)
1999	winners	table	Bandar Seri Begawan, Brunei Darussalam	234	234	232	313	779	Joscelin Yeo (SIN) (6–2–0)	Joscelin Yeo (SIN) (6–2–0)
2007	winners	table	Nakhon Ratchasima, Thailand	477	477	470	595	1542	Miguel Molina (PHI) (4–1–1)	Miguel Molina (PHI) (4–1–1)
2011	winners	table	Palembang and Jakarta, Indonesia	545	554	549	704	1807	Tao Li (SIN) (7–0–1)	Tao Li (SIN) (7–0–1)
2013	winners	table	Naypyidaw, Myanmar		461	459	611	1531	Joseph Schooling (SIN) (5–1–0)	Joseph Schooling (SIN) (5–1–0)
2015	winners	table	Singapore		403	401	509	1334	Joseph Schooling (SIN) (9-0-0)	Nguyễn Thị Ánh Viên (VIE) (8–1–1)
2017	winners	table	Kuala Lumpur, Malaysia		406	402	526	1334	Nguyễn Thị Ánh Viên (VIE) (8–1–0)	Nguyễn Thị Ánh Viên (VIE) (8–1–0)

== See also ==
- List of multiple Southeast Asian Games medalists
- List of SEA Games medalists in athletics
- List of SEA Games medalists in swimming (men)
- List of SEA Games medalists in table tennis
