= Wushu at the 1997 SEA Games =

- Venue: Jakarta Fair
- Dates: October 14-17, 1997

Wushu at the 1997 Southeast Asian Games was held at the Jakarta Fair in Jakarta, Indonesia from October 14-17, 1997.

== Medal table ==
* Host nation (Indonesia)

Rank	Nation	Gold	Silver	Bronze	Total
1	Indonesia (INA)*	7	3	4	14
2	Philippines (PHI)	6	3	1	10
3	Vietnam (VIE)	4	5	2	11
4	Malaysia (MAS)	2	3	4	9
5	Singapore (SIN)	2	0	5	7
6	Thailand (THA)	1	1	3	5
7	Myanmar (MYA)	0	2	3	5
8	Laos (LAO)	0	0	2	2
Totals (8 entries)		22	17	24	63

== Medalists ==
=== Men's taolu ===
Event	Gold	Silver	Bronze
Changquan	Vincent Ng; Singapore	Oh Poh Soon; Malaysia; Garry Cua; Philippines	none awarded
Daoshu	Vincent Ng; Singapore; Chow Kam Onn; Malaysia	none awarded	Phung Thong Voradej; Thailand
Jianshu	Alfonso Que; Philippines	Herman Wijaya; Indonesia	Sutanyo Purnamadjaja; Indonesia
Gunshu	Herman Wijaya; Indonesia	Sutanyo Purnamadjaja; Indonesia	Chow Kam Onn; Malaysia
Qiangshu	Alfonso Que; Philippines	Ho Ro Bin; Malaysia	Dương Duy Kiếm; Vietnam
Nanquan	Tanamal Aryanto; Indonesia	Zaw Zaw Moe; Myanmar	Ho Ro Bin; Malaysia; Picasso Tan; Singapore
Taijiquan	Bobby Co; Philippines; Cheah Kok Luan; Malaysia	none awarded	Hartono Seputro; Indonesia

=== Men's sanda ===
Event	Gold	Silver	Bronze
Sanshou (52 kg)	Christian John; Indonesia	Nguyen Anh Tuan; Vietnam	Rully Chulang; Philippines
Sanshou (52 kg)	Christian John; Indonesia	Nguyen Anh Tuan; Vietnam	Tan Lih Wei; Malaysia
Sanshou (56 kg)	Dao Viet Lap; Vietnam	Meiyani; Indonesia	Khamshouthone PH; Thailand
Sanshou (56 kg)	Dao Viet Lap; Vietnam	Meiyani; Indonesia	Tun Tun Oo; Myanmar
Sanshou (60 kg)	Teguh Prastowo; Indonesia	Diep Bhao Minh; Vietnam	Khammanoune; Laos
Sanshou (60 kg)	Teguh Prastowo; Indonesia	Diep Bhao Minh; Vietnam	Prasert Jantha; Thailand
Sanshou (65 kg)	Komsam Tongtap; Thailand	Ronald Bingwa Oel; Philippines	Lee Ngock Quang; Vietnam
Sanshou (65 kg)	Komsam Tongtap; Thailand	Ronald Bingwa Oel; Philippines	Vansay; Laos
Sanshou (70 kg)	Jerome Lumabas; Philippines	Onn Srikoklarm; Thailand	Tan Cheng Tee Benny; Singapore
Sanshou (70 kg)	Jerome Lumabas; Philippines	Onn Srikoklarm; Thailand	Alfrits Maweru; Indonesia

=== Women's talou ===
Event	Gold	Silver	Bronze
Changquan	Nguyễn Thúy Hiền; Vietnam	Nguyễn Thanh Loan; Vietnam	Sherlie Hoediono; Indonesia
Daoshu	Nguyễn Thúy Hiền; Vietnam	Nguyễn Thị Ngọc Oanh; Vietnam	Khine Zin Win; Myanmar
Jianshu	Sherlie Hoediono; Indonesia; Stephanie Loraine Lim; Philippines	none awarded	Chiew Hui Yan; Singapore
Gunshu	Olivia Setiadi; Indonesia	Ng Choo Bee; Malaysia	Khine Zin Win; Myanmar
Qiangshu	Stephanie Lorraine Lim; Philippines	Nguyễn Phương Lan; Vietnam	Chiew Hui Yan; Singapore
Nanquan	Nguyễn Phương Lan; Vietnam	Stephpanie Aan Oranga; Philippines	Li Voon Keh; Malaysia
Taijiquan	Jainab; Indonesia	Khaing Khaing Maw; Myanmar	Tan Mui Buay; Singapore
