= Wan Azlan =

Malaysian swimmer (born 1975)

Personal information
- National team: Malaysia
- Born: Wan Azlan bin Wan Ali Abdullah; 5 June 1975 (age 51)
- Height: 1.88 m (6 ft 2 in)
- Weight: 77 kg (170 lb)

Sport
- Sport: Swimming
- Strokes: Freestyle, medley
- Club: Pine Crest Swim Club (U.S.)
- College team: University of Georgia (U.S.)
- Coach: David López-Zubero (U.S.)
Medal record
Men's swimming
Representing Malaysia
Southeast Asian Games
Gold medal – first place	1997 Jakarta	200 m medley
Gold medal – first place	1997 Jakarta	400 m medley
Bronze medal – third place	1995 Chiang Mai	400 m medley

Wan Azlan bin Wan Ali Abdullah (professionally known as Wan Azlan Abdullah; born 5 June 1975) is a retired Malaysian swimmer, who specialised in freestyle and in individual medley events. He is a two-time Olympian (1996 and 2000), and a gold medalist at the Southeast Asian Games (1997). While studying in the United States, Abdullah trained for the Pine Crest Swim Club in Fort Lauderdale, Florida under his full-time coach David López-Zubero, a bronze medalist for Spain at the 1980 Summer Olympics. During his college career, Abdullah swam for the University of Georgia's Georgia Bulldogs swimming and diving team under head coach Jack Bauerle.

Abdullah made his first Malaysian team at the 1996 Summer Olympics in Atlanta. There, he failed to reach the top 16 final in any of his individual events, finishing thirty-sixth in the 200 m individual medley (2:12.11), and twenty-seventh in the 400 m individual medley (4:38.95, a slowest prelims time). He also placed twentieth, along with his Malaysian teammates Alex Lim, Elvin Chia, and Anthony Ang, in the 4×100 m medley relay (3:56.24).

The following year, at the 1997 Southeast Asian Games in Jakarta, Indonesia, Abdullah won two gold medals each in the 200 m individual medley (2:07.80), and in the 400 m individual medley (4:32.75).

Abdullah swam only in the men's 400 m individual medley at the 2000 Summer Olympics in Sydney. He achieved a FINA B-cut of 4:34.50 from the Asian Swimming Championships in Busan, South Korea. He challenged seven other swimmers in heat two, including 1996 Olympic silver medalist Jani Sievinen of Finland, and 16-year-old George Bovell of Trinidad and Tobago. Abdullah posted a time of 4:36.90 to save a seventh spot over Croatia's Sandro Tomaš by a 1.4-second advantage. Abdullah failed to reach the top 8 final, as he placed forty-first overall in the prelims.
