= Philippines at the 1997 SEA Games =

Philippines at the 1997 Southeast Asian Games
- IOC code: PHI
- NOC: Philippine Olympic Committee
- Website: www.olympic.ph (in English)

in Jakarta
- Competitors: 490 in 36 sports
- Flag bearer: Paeng Nepomuceno
- Medals Ranked 4th: Gold 43 Silver 57 Bronze 109 Total 209

Southeast Asian Games appearances (overview)
- 1977; 1979; 1981; 1983; 1985; 1987; 1989; 1991; 1993; 1995; 1997; 1999; 2001; 2003; 2005; 2007; 2009; 2011; 2013; 2015; 2017; 2019; 2021; 2023; 2025; 2027; 2029

The Philippines participated at the 19th Southeast Asian Games held in Jakarta, Indonesia from 11 to 19 October 1997.

== SEA Games performance ==
The Philippines slipped from third place to fourth slot. Philippine officials had earlier predicted a third-place finish before the Games. The Philippines sent an 800-member delegation, the country's biggest SEA Games contingent ever. The Philippines surpassed their 33-gold mark in 1995 with a harvest of 43 golds, with 56 silvers and 108 bronzes.

Young gymnast Pia Adele Reyes was the only three-gold medal winner, winning individual titles in floor exercise and balance beam besides sharing the artistic team gold. She also bagged silver honors.

Elma Muros-Posadas ruled the heptathlon in a new SEA Games mark of 5,269 points. She captured her unprecedented seventh long jump title by clearing 6.45 meters. Swimmer Ryan Papa was the next best individual performer, winning two golds and three silvers.

The games that won golds for the country were Wushu, Fencing, Taekwondo, Golf and Archery. As expected, the Philippines won the gold in men's basketball.

== Medalists ==
=== Gold ===
No.	Medal	Name	Sport	Event
1	Gold	Philippines	Archery	Men's team recurve
2	Gold	Philippines	Archery	Women's team recurve
3	Gold	Elma Muros-Posadas	Athletics	Women's Heptathlon
4	Gold	Philippines	Basketball	Men's team
5	Gold	Victor Arpilleda	Billiards	Men's 15-Ball Rotation
6	Gold	Richard de Guzman	Fencing	-
7	Gold	Pia Adele Reyes	Gymnastics	-
8	Gold	John Baylon	Judo	Men's 76kg
9	Gold	Carolino Gonzales	Shooting	Men's 50m Free Pistol
10	Gold	Raymond Papa	Swimming	Men's 100m backstroke
11	Gold	Raymond Papa	Swimming	Men's 200m backstroke
12	Gold	Roberto Cruz	Taekwondo	Men's Pinweight
13	Gold	Alesandro Lubiano	Taekwondo	Men's Middleweight
14	Gold	Alvin Taraya	Taekwondo	Men's welterweight
15	Gold	Nelia Sy	Taekwondo	Women's Lightweight
16	Gold	Melchor Tumasis	Wrestling	Men's 58kg
17	Gold	Bobby Co	Wushu	Men's taijiquan
18	Gold	Stephanie Lim	Wushu	Women's jianshu
19	Gold	Stephanie Lim	Wushu	Women's qiangshu
20	Gold	Alfonso Que	Wushu	Men's jianshu
21	Gold	Alfonso Que	Wushu	Men's qiangshu
22	Gold	Jerome Lumabas	Wushu	Men's sanshou 70kg

=== Silver ===
No.	Medal	Name	Sport	Event
1	Silver	Raymond Papa	Swimming	Men's 50m freestyle
2	Silver	Raymond Papa	Swimming	Men's 100m freestyle
3	Silver	Raymond Papa	Swimming	Men's 200m freestyle
4	Silver	Kathy Echiverri	Swimming	Women's 100m breaststroke
5	Silver	Joseph Lizardo	Tennis	Men's singles

=== Bronze ===
No.	Medal	Name	Sport	Event
1	Bronze	Christian Cubilla	Archery	Men's individual recurve
2	Bronze	Amparo Lim; Kennie Asuncion	Badminton	Women's doubles
3	Bronze	Kathy Echiverri	Swimming	Women's 50m freestyle
4	Bronze	Kathy Echiverri	Swimming	Women's 100m backstroke
5	Bronze	Robert Angelo; Bryan Juinio; Joseph Lizardo; Michael John Misa	Tennis	Men's team
6	Bronze	Jennifer Saret; Pamela Floro; Maricris Fernandez; Marisue Jacutin	Tennis	Women's team
7	Bronze	Philippines	Water Polo	Men's team
8	Bronze	Ramon Solis	Weightlifting	Men's Weightlifting

=== Multiple ===
Name	Sport	1st place, gold medalist(s)	2nd place, silver medalist(s)	3rd place, bronze medalist(s)	Total
Raymond Papa	Swimming	2	3	0	5
Alfonso Que	Wushu	2	0	0	2
Stephanie Lim	Wushu	2	0	0	2
Kathy Echiverri	Swimming	0	1	2	3
Joseph Lizardo	Tennis	0	1	1	2

== Medal summary ==
=== By sports ===
Sport	Gold	Silver	Bronze	Total
Taekwondo	6	5	1	12
Wushu	6	3	1	10
Fencing	4	6	3	13
Athletics	3	4	3	10
Golf	3	0	0	3
Judo	2	5	6	13
Swimming	2	4	3	9
Rowing	2	2	4	8
Shooting	2	1	4	7
Archery	2	1	0	3
Karate	1	5	9	15
Wrestling	1	4	4	9
Bowling	1	3	4	8
Gymnastics	1	3	3	7
Billiards and snooker	1	1	5	7
Softball	1	1	0	2
Pencak silat	1	0	10	11
Basketball	1	0	0	1
Weightlifting	0	4	4	8
Cycling	0	1	5	6
Tennis	0	1	1	2
Traditional boat race	0	0	7	7
Boxing	0	0	3	3
Sailing	0	0	3	3
Squash	0	0	2	2
Badminton	0	0	1	1
Totals (26 entries)	40	54	86	180
