= Vicha Ratanachote =

Thai swimmer (born 1977)

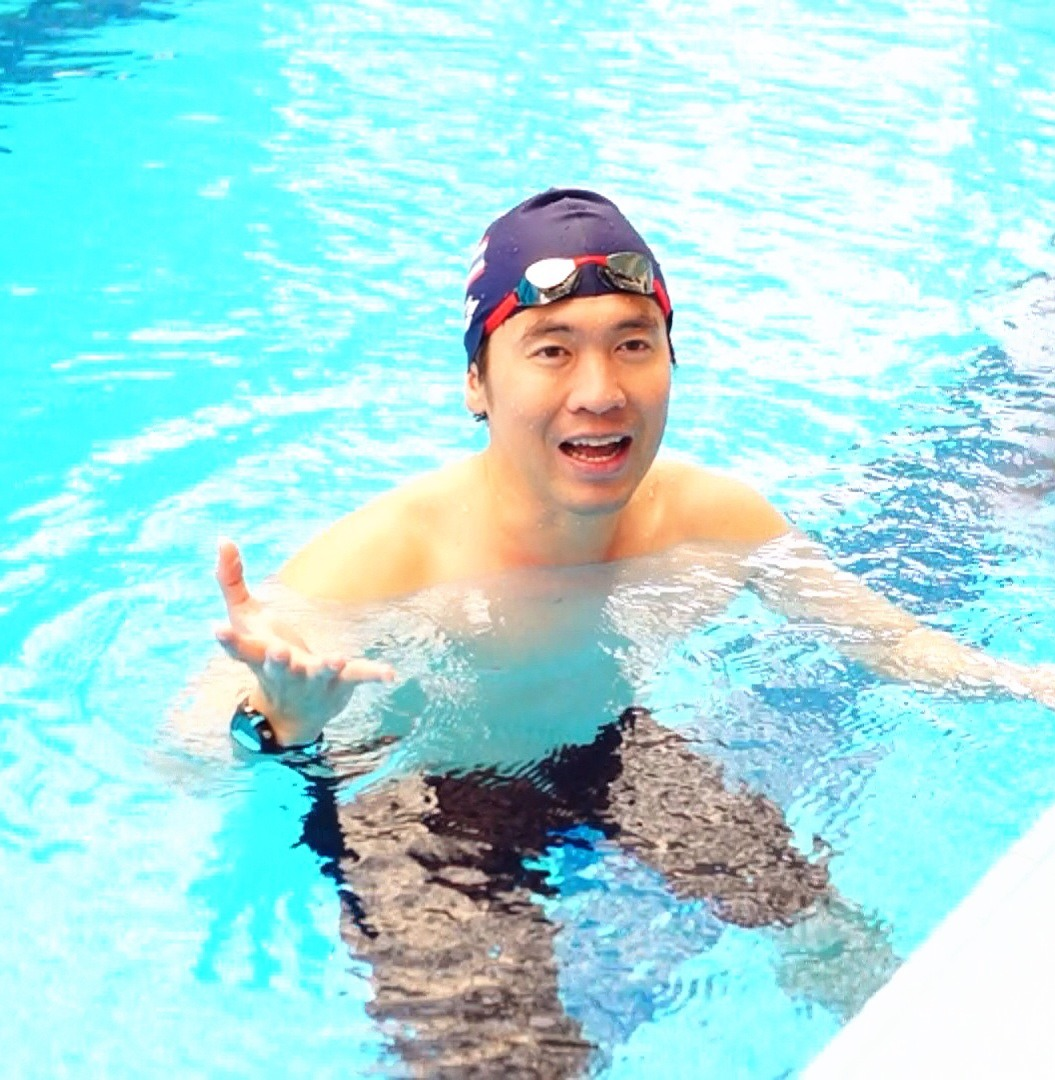

Personal information
- Full name: Vicha Ratanachote
- National team: Thailand
- Born: 22 February 1977 (age 49) Bangkok, Thailand
- Height: 1.83 m (6 ft 0 in)
- Weight: 75 kg (165 lb)

Sport
- Sport: Swimming
- Strokes: Freestyle
- College team: University of Southern California (U.S.)
- Coach: Mark Schubert (U.S.)
Medal record
Men's swimming
Representing Thailand
Southeast Asian Games
Gold medal – first place	1995 Chiang Mai	4x200m freestyle relay
Gold medal – first place	1999 Brunei	200 m freestyle
Silver medal – second place	1995 Chiang Mai	4x100m freestyle relay
Silver medal – second place	1995 Chiang Mai	400m freestyle
Bronze medal – third place	1995 Chinga Mai	200m freestyle

Vicha Ratanachote (Thai: วิชา รัตนโชติ; born February 22, 1977) is a Thai former swimmer, who specialized in middle-distance freestyle events. In 1999, Ratanachote became a SEA Games champion in the 200 m freestyle, and later represented Thailand at the 2000 Summer Olympics. While studying in the United States, he is a member of the USC Trojans swimming and diving team under head coach Mark Schubert.

At the 1999 Southeast Asian Games in Bandar Seri Begawan, Brunei, Ratanachote powered past the entire field to earn a gold medal in the 200 m freestyle with a time of 1:53.43.

Ratanachote competed in the men's 200 m freestyle at the 2000 Summer Olympics in Sydney. After winning a gold medal from the SEA Games, his entry time of 1:53.43 was accredited under a FINA B-standard. He challenged seven other swimmers in heat three, including 17-year-olds Damian Alleyne of Barbados and Wu Nien-pin of the Chinese Taipei. He rounded out the field to last place by 0.33 of a second behind Wu in a time of 1:54.91. Ratanachote failed to advance into the semifinals, as he placed thirty-first overall in the prelims.
