= Toby Haenen =

Australian swimmer

Personal information
- Full name: Toby Christian Haenen
- National team: Australia
- Born: 8 October 1973 (age 52) Launceston, Tasmania
- Height: 1.91 m (6 ft 3 in)
- Weight: 84 kg (185 lb)

Sport
- Sport: Swimming
- Strokes: Backstroke
Medal record
Representing Australia
Olympic Games
Bronze medal – third place	Atlanta 1996	4×100 m medley relay

Toby Christian Haenen (born 8 October 1973) is an Australian backstroke swimmer of the 1990s, who won a bronze medal in the 4×100-metre medley relay at the 1996 Summer Olympics. He also competed at the 1992 Summer Olympics.

Haenen made his international debut at the 1992 Barcelona Games, where he finished 45th and 35th, respectively, in the 100-metre and 200-metre backstroke. At the 1996 Summer Olympics in Atlanta, Haenen swam the backstroke leg in the heats of the 4×100-metre medley relay, before being replaced by Steven Dewick in the team that trailed the United States and Russian teams in the final. Haenen did not compete in any individual events.

== Business career ==
Toby Haenen Swim Centre was established in 1994 in City of Bayside in Melbourne.

Toby Haenen started ENGINE SWIM a swimwear in 2004.
