= Albert Sutanto =

Indonesian swimmer

Personal information
- Full name: Albert Christiadi Sutanto
- National team: Indonesia
- Born: 24 December 1975 (age 50) Surabaya, East Java, Indonesia
- Height: 1.75 m (5 ft 9 in)
- Weight: 66 kg (146 lb)

Sport
- Sport: Swimming
- Strokes: Butterfly, medley
Medal record
Men's swimming
Representing Indonesia
Southeast Asian Games
Gold medal – first place	1995 Bangkok	4 x 100m freestyle relay
Gold medal – first place	1999 Brunei	100 m butterfly
Gold medal – first place	1999 Brunei	200 m butterfly
Silver medal – second place	1997 Jakarta	200 m butterfly
Bronze medal – third place	1995 Bangkok	400 m freestyle
Bronze medal – third place	1995 Bangkok	1500 m freestyle
Bronze medal – third place	1997 Jakarta	100 m butterfly
Bronze medal – third place	1997 Jakarta	400 m individual medley

Albert Christiadi Sutanto (born December 24, 1975) is an Indonesian former swimmer, who specialized in butterfly and medley events. He is a two-time Olympian (2000 and 2004), and multi medalist 9 Gold 5 Silver and 16 Bronze at the Southeast Asian Games (1991 to 2005).

Sutanto made his first Indonesian team, along with his twin brother Felix, at the 2000 Summer Olympics in Sydney. He failed to reach the top 16 in any of his individual events, finishing fifty-fifth in the 100 m butterfly (56.50), and forty-second in the 200 m butterfly (2:05.13).

At the 2003 Southeast Asian Games in Hanoi, Vietnam, Sutanto won a bronze medal in the 200 m butterfly with a time of 2:05.03. He also blasted an Indonesian record of 2:06.09 in the 200 m individual medley, but managed to pull off a fourth-place effort in the final.

Sutanto shortened his swimming program at the 2004 Summer Olympics in Athens, as his spots in both 100 and 200 m butterfly were respectively taken by Andy Wibowo and Donny Utomo. Instead, he qualified only for the 200 m individual medley. After breaking his own record from the SEA Games, his entry time of 2:06.09 was officially accredited under a FINA B-standard. He challenged seven other swimmers in heat three, including Denmark's Jacob Carstensen and South Korea's Kim Bang-Hyun, who both competed at their third Olympics. Sutanto upset SEA Games bronze medalist Gary Tan of Singapore to take a sixth seed by less than nearly a second in 2:07.55. Sutanto failed to advance into the semifinals, as he placed fortieth overall in the preliminaries.
