= Muhammad Akbar Nasution =

Indonesian swimmer (born 1983)

Personal information
- Full name: Muhammad Akbar Nasution
- National team: Indonesia
- Born: 6 May 1983 (age 43) Jakarta, Indonesia
- Height: 1.74 m (5 ft 9 in)
- Weight: 60 kg (132 lb)

Sport
- Sport: Swimming
- Strokes: Freestyle, breaststroke, medley
- College team: Chaffey College (U.S.)
- Coach: Mike Dickson (U.S.)
Medal record
Men's swimming
Representing Indonesia
Southeast Asian Games
| Silver medal – second place | 2001 Kuala Lumpur | 200 m breaststroke |
| Silver medal – second place | 2005 Manila | 400 m freestyle |
| Silver medal – second place | 2007 Bangkok | 400 m medley |
| Bronze medal – third place | 1999 Brunei | 200 m breaststroke |
| Bronze medal – third place | 2001 Kuala Lumpur | 100 m breaststroke |
| Bronze medal – third place | 2007 Bangkok | 200 m medley |
| Bronze medal – third place | 2011 Jakarta | 400 m medley |

Muhammad Akbar Nasution (born 6 May 1983) is an Indonesian former swimmer, who specialised in breaststroke, but also competed in long-distance freestyle and individual medley. Starting as a 17-year-old appearing at the 2000 Summer Olympics, Nasution is considered one of Indonesia's top-ranked swimmers in his decade. He has won a total of six medals (three silver and three bronze) from the Southeast Asian Games since 2001 and has held numerous Indonesian records in long-distance freestyle (400 and 800 m) and in individual medley (200 and 400 m). At the peak of his sporting career, Nasurion has also travelled extensively across Asia, Australia, and the United States to train for world-class swim clubs, and to further focus on his education, including his four-year stay at Chaffey College in Rancho Cucamonga, California.

== Career ==
=== Early years ===
Nasution, a native of Jakarta, Indonesia, started his sporting career under the influence of his father Radja Nasution, a prominent Indonesian swimming coach. Being the youngest and the only son in the family, Nasution trained with his three elder sisters, namely Elfira, Maya, Elsa and Kevin, who shared same goals and potentials with him to become a certified swimmer. His third oldest sister Elsa Manora Nasution, an elite backstroke swimmer, also competed with him at the Olympics as part of the Indonesian squad.

=== International career ===
In 1999, Nasution made his official debut, as a 16-year-old, at the Southeast Asian Games in Bandar Seri Begawan, Brunei, along with his sister Elsa Manora Nasution. Although he did not consider a heavy favourite, Nasution earned a bronze medal in the 200 m breaststroke at 2:20.59, just a full body length behind Malaysia's Elvin Chia and Thailand's Ratapong Sirisanont.

Nasution competed only in the men's 200 m breaststroke at the 2000 Summer Olympics in Sydney. After winning a bronze medal from SEA Games, his entry time of 2:20.59 was officially accredited under a FINA B-standard. He challenged seven other swimmers in heat three, including Costa Rica's two-time Olympian Juan José Madrigal. He held off Hong Kong's Tam Chi Kin to pick up a sixth seed by 0.23 of a second in a time of 2:23.81. Nasution failed to advance into the semi-finals, as he placed fortieth overall in the prelims. During his Olympic visit, Nasution was not considered an elite swimmer, but also a sport fan, posing for pictures and talked with Australian legends Grant Hackett and Ian Thorpe, as well as Americans Tom Malchow, Lenny Krayzelburg, and Gary Hall, Jr. Meeting with his sporting heroes, he recalled his greatest Olympic moment: "It was a lot of fun. They were guys I heard about and idolized growing up but after meeting them, they're just normal guys. They were all nice."

At the 2001 Southeast Asian Games in Kuala Lumpur, Malaysia, Nasution collected only two medals in swimming, a silver in the 200 m breaststroke (2:22.82) and a bronze in the 100 m breaststroke (1:06.04).

Shortly after the Games, Nasution left his native Indonesia to spend his two-year residency and training in Australia under famed swimming coach Denis Cotterell. He also accepted a full athletic scholarship to attend Chaffey College in Rancho Cucamonga, California, and later became a member of the school's swim team under head coach Mike Dickson. While playing for Chaffey, he received California State Swimmer of the Year honours twice, posting wins and personal bests in three events: 500-yard freestyle (4:30.82), 400-yard individual medley (3:57.08) and 200-yard breaststroke (2:02.93). Nasution also helped the school's freestyle relay team to a fourth-place finish, and the medley relay to sixth.

Despite his training schedule and education in the United States, Nasution continued to compete for the Indonesian squad in international tournaments. He set an Indonesian record in the 400 m freestyle (4:00.57), and later helped his teammates Richard Sam Bera and twins Felix and Albert Sutanto capture a silver medal in the 4 × 100 m freestyle relay (3:29.46) at the 2005 Southeast Asian Games in Manila, Philippines. Two years later, Nasution added two more medals, a silver and a bronze, to his career hardware in a medley double at the 2007 Southeast Asian Games in Bangkok, Thailand. When Indonesia hosted his fifth Southeast Asian Games in Jakarta four years later, Nasution took home a bronze medal for the host squad in the 400 m individual medley, posting a lifetime best of 4:31.27.

== See also ==
- Chaffey College
- Indonesia at the 2000 Summer Olympics
- List of Indonesian records in swimming
