= Gerald Koh (swimmer) =

Singaporean swimmer

Personal information
- Born: 20 June 1978 (age 48)

Sport
- Sport: Swimming
Medal record
Representing Singapore
SEA Games
| Silver medal – second place | 1993 Singapore | 200m backstroke |
| Silver medal – second place | 1995 Chiang Mai | 4x200m freestyle relay |
| Bronze medal – third place | 1995 Chiang Mai | 100m backstroke |
| Bronze medal – third place | 1995 Chiang Mai | 200m backstroke |
| Bronze medal – third place | 2001 Kuala Lumpur | 200m backstroke |

Gerald Koh Mun Yew (born 20 June 1978) is a Singaporean former backstroke, freestyle and medley swimmer. He competed in five events at the 1996 Summer Olympics.

== Swimming career ==
Koh won the bronze medal in the 200m backstroke at the 2001 Southeast Asian Games.

Koh retired from competitive swimming in 2003.

== Personal life ==
Koh has an elder brother, Desmond Koh, who is also a former swimmer for Singapore.
