= Niti Intharapichai =

Thai swimmer

Personal information
- Born: 24 August 1976 (age 49) Thailand

Sport
- Sport: Swimming
Medal record
Representing Thailand
SEA Games
Gold medal – first place	1993 Singapore	200m butterfly
Silver medal – second place	1995 Chiang Mai	200m butterfly
Bronze medal – third place	1993 Singapore	100m butterfly

Niti Intharapichai (born 24 August 1976) is a Thai swimmer. He competed in two events at the 1996 Summer Olympics.
