= Raymond Papa =

Filipino swimmer

Personal information
- Full name: Raymond Anthony Papa
- Nickname: Ryan
- Nationality: Philippines
- Born: 14 October 1976 (age 50)

Sport
- Sport: Swimming
- Club: Club Wolverine
- College team: University of Michigan
- Coach: Jon Urbanchek (U. Michigan]]
Medal record
Men's aquatics
Representing Philippines
Event	1st	2nd	3rd
World Masters Championships	3	-	-
Asian Games	-	-	2
Southeast Asian Games	7	3	2
Total	10	3	4
World Masters Championships
Gold medal – first place	Montreal 2014	50 m backstroke
Gold medal – first place	Montreal 2014	100 m backstroke
Gold medal – first place	Montreal 2014	200 m backstroke
Asian Games
Bronze medal – third place	Bangkok 1998	100 m backstroke
Bronze medal – third place	Bangkok 1998	200 m backstroke
Southeast Asian Games
Gold medal – first place	Jakarta 1997	100 m backstroke
Gold medal – first place	Jakarta 1997	200 m backstroke
Silver medal – second place	Jakarta 1997	50 m freestyle
Silver medal – second place	Jakarta 1997	100 m freestyle
Silver medal – second place	Jakarta 1997	200 m freestyle
Gold medal – first place	Chiang Mai 1995	100 m backstroke
Gold medal – first place	Chiang Mai 1995	200 m backstroke
Gold medal – first place	Singapore 1993	200 m backstroke
Gold medal – first place	Singapore 1993	100 m backstroke
Gold medal – first place	Manila 1991	4x100 m medley relay
Bronze medal – third place	Manila 1991	50 m freestyle
Bronze medal – third place	Manila 1991	100 m backstroke

Raymond Anthony Papa (born 14 October 1976) is a Filipino swimmer who has competed for the Philippines at the Summer Olympic Games.

== Swimming career ==
Papa represented the Philippines in various international competitions including the 1992 Summer Olympics in Barcelona, 1996 Summer Olympics in Atlanta, 1994 Asian Games in Hiroshima, 1998 Asian Games in Bangkok, 1997 World University Games in Sicily, 1995 Pan Pacific Games in Atlanta, 1991 SouthEast Asian Games in Manila, 1993 SouthEast Asian Games in Singapore, 1995 SouthEast Asian Games in Chiang Mai, 1997 SouthEast Asian Games in Jakarta.

=== Olympic Games ===
In Atlanta 1996, Papa competed in the 200 meter freestyle, 100 meter backstroke, and the 200 meter backstroke events. In the 200 meter backstroke, he finished sixth in the third heat by clocking 2:05.69 and finished 25th overall in the heats. In the 100 meter backstroke, he finished second in the third heat by clocking 57.67. He trained with the University of Michigan swim team under Jon Urbanchek while preparing for the 1996 Olympics.

Papa made his Olympic debut at the 1992 Summer Olympics in Barcelona while training with the Trojan Swim Club in Los Angeles, CA. In the 200 meter backstroke, Papa was disqualified after he had a problem in his preparation. He jumped into the swimming pool before the start of the heat but his googlies fell underwater. He struggled getting his googles back and when he went back to his starting mark he was disqualified by the referee for "deliberate delay". Protests from the crowd further delayed the start of the heat by a minute. He also competed at the 100 meter backstroke and the 4 x 100 meter medley relay. In the 100 meter backstroke, Papa had a fourth-place finish in the second heat by clocking 59.88 but failed to advance to the final round after finishing 43rd overall in the heats. In the latter event, he along with set a national record in the 4 x 100 meter medley relay by clocking 3:53.64 in the third heat for an overall 18th finish in the heats.

=== Other ===
Papa still holds the Philippines record for the 200 meter backstroke event with the time of 2:00.96 which he set at the 1997 Southeast Asian Games. It was also the SEA games record for the event which remained unbroken until 2015 when Singapore's Quah Zheng Wen broke it by clocking 2:00.55.

Papa held the Philippine record for the 100 backstroke from 1997 to 2019. Jerard Jacinto broke the 22-year-old record.

At the 2014 Masters World Championships, he won 3 golds for the 50 meter backstroke, 100 meter backstroke, and 200 meter backstroke.

In the 1998 Asian Games, he won 2 bronze medals for the 100 meter backstroke and 200 meter backstroke.

In 1997 he was ranked 16th in the world for his 2:00.96 in the 200 meter backstroke, a gold in the SouthEast Asian Games.

== Personal life ==
Raymond Papa graduated from University of Michigan with a Bachelor of Science degree in Computer Science, swimming under Head Coach Jon Urbanchek. For High school, he graduated in 1994 from Mercersburg Academy. His native language is Filipino.
