= Miguel Mendoza =

Filipino swimmer (born 1982)

Personal information
- Full name: Juan Carlos Miguel Mendoza
- National team: Philippines
- Born: April 28, 1982 (age 44) Manila, Philippines
- Height: 5 ft 7 in (170 cm) (2004)

Sport
- Sport: Swimming
- College team: University of Georgia (U.S.)
Medal record
Southeast Asian Games
Gold medal – first place	2003 Hanoi	1500 m freestyle
Gold medal – first place	2005 Manila	1500 m freestyle
Silver medal – second place	2001 Kuala Lumpur	400 m freestyle
Silver medal – second place	2001 Kuala Lumpur	1500 m freestyle
Silver medal – second place	2003 Hanoi	400 m freestyle

Juan Carlos Miguel Mendoza (born April 28, 1982) is a former swimmer from the Philippines. He represented his native country at the 2000 Summer Olympics where he beat the 400m freestyle record of fellow Filipino athlete Ryan Papa. He also represented the Philippines in the 2004 Summer Olympics but ended the 1,500 meter freestyle heat at last place. A freestyle specialist, Mendoza is a 1,500 metres gold medalist at the Southeast Asian Games. Mendoza studied management information systems at the University of Georgia.

== See also ==
- List of University of Georgia people
