= Leslie Kwok =

Singaporean swimmer (born 1973)

Personal information
- Full name: Leslie Kwok Ying Wah
- National team: Singapore
- Born: 12 November 1973 (age 52)
- Height: 1.84 m (6 ft 0 in)
- Weight: 78 kg (172 lb)

Sport
- Sport: Swimming
- Strokes: Freestyle
- Club: Chinese Swimming Club
Medal record
Men's swimming
Representing Singapore
Southeast Asian Games
Bronze medal – third place	1997 Jakarta	50 m freestyle
Bronze medal – third place	1999 Brunei	50 m freestyle
Bronze medal – third place	2005 Manila	50 m freestyle

Leslie Kwok Ying Wah (born 12 November 1973) is a Singaporean former swimmer, who specialized in sprint freestyle events and later turned into an actor, entrepreneur, and a part-time professional model. He earned three bronze medals each in the 50 m freestyle from the Southeast Asian Games, and later represented Singapore at the 2000 Summer Olympics. Kwok is also an Anglo-Chinese School alumnus, and later a graduate with a bachelor of science degree in civil and structural engineering at Nanyang Technological University.

Kwok competed for Singapore in the men's 50 m freestyle at the 2000 Summer Olympics in Sydney. He achieved a FINA B-cut of 23.72 from the Southeast Asian Games in Bandar Seri Begawan, Brunei. He challenged seven other swimmers in heat four, including Kyrgyzstan's Sergey Ashihmin, Goodwill Games silver medalist for Russia, and Kazakhstan's two-time Olympian Sergey Borisenko. Diving in with a 0.73-second deficit, Kwok scorched the entire race to share a fourth seed with Peru's Luis López Hartinger in an exact time of 24.00, but finished outside an entry standard. Kwok failed to advance into the semifinals, as he placed forty-ninth overall in the prelims.

At the 2005 Southeast Asian Games in Manila, Kwok added a third bronze to his six-year-old hardware in the 50 m freestyle (23.58), finishing behind Indonesia's veteran Richard Sam Bera and Thailand's newcomer Arwut Chinnapasaen by more than half a second (0.50).

In early 2006, Kwok announced his official retirement from swimming to extend his resume in entrepreneurship and other lifestyle businesses. As a part-time professional model, he has appeared in several sports magazines, print ad campaigns, and TV commercials, and has featured on the cover of a popular Asian woman magazine Female. A top-class entrepreneur, Kwok currently owns a massage and health spa called Elements Spa & Slimming, founded in April 2002.
