= Sukrutai Tommaoros =

Thai diver

Personal information
- Nationality: Thai
- Born: 5 February 1982 (age 43)

Sport
- Sport: Diving

Sukrutai Tommaoros (born 5 February 1982) is a Thai diver. She competed in the women's 10 metre platform event at the 1996 Summer Olympics.
