= Elsa Manora Nasution =

Indonesian swimmer (born 1977)

Personal information
- Full name: Elsa Manora Nasution
- National team: Indonesia
- Born: 25 October 1977 (age 48) Jakarta, Indonesia
- Height: 1.70 m (5 ft 7 in)
- Weight: 60 kg (132 lb)
- Spouse: Ricky Subagja (m. 2000; div. 2006)

Sport
- Sport: Swimming
- Strokes: Backstroke
Medal record
Women's swimming
Representing Indonesia
Southeast Asian Games
Bronze medal – third place	2003 Hanoi	100 m backstroke

Elsa Manora Nasution (born 25 October 1977) is an Indonesian former swimmer, who specialized in backstroke events. She represented Indonesia at the 2000 Summer Olympics, and later captured a bronze medal in the 100 m backstroke at the 2003 Southeast Asian Games in Hanoi, Vietnam. She is also a third eldest sister of Muhammad Akbar Nasution, an elite breaststroke and medley swimmer, who competed with her at the Olympics as part of the Indonesian squad. Nasution is divorced from her husband Ricky Subagja, a prominent badminton player and 1996 Olympic doubles champion.

Nasution competed only in the women's 100 m backstroke at the 2000 Summer Olympics in Sydney. She achieved a FINA B-cut of 1:05.69 from the Asian Championships in Busan, South Korea. She challenged seven other swimmers in heat two, including teenagers Sherry Tsai of Hong Kong (aged 17) and Kuan Chia-hsien of Chinese Taipei. Keeping her pace from the start, she shared a fifth seed with Uruguay's Serrana Fernández in a matching time of 1:06.57, almost a full second below her entry standard. Nasution failed to advance into the semifinals, as she placed thirty-eighth overall in the prelims.

At the 2003 Southeast Asian Games in Hanoi, Vietnam, Nasution earned a bronze medal in the 100 m backstroke with a time of 1:07.38, finishing over two body lengths behind defending champion Chonlathorn Vorathamrong of Thailand.
