= Torwai Sethsothorn =

Thai swimmer (born 1982)

Personal information
- Full name: Torwai Sethsothorn
- National team: Thailand
- Born: 14 February 1982 (age 44) Bangkok, Thailand
- Height: 1.81 m (5 ft 11 in)
- Weight: 69 kg (152 lb)

Sport
- Sport: Swimming
- Strokes: Freestyle, backstroke, medley
- Club: Mission Viejo Nadadores (U.S.)
- Coach: Terry Stoddard (U.S.)
Medal record
Men's swimming
Representing Thailand
Southeast Asian Games
Gold medal – first place	2001 Kuala Lumpur	400 m freestyle
Gold medal – first place	2001 Kuala Lumpur	1500 m freestyle
Gold medal – first place	2001 Kuala Lumpur	400 m medley

Torwai Sethsothorn (Thai: ต่อวัย เสฏฐโสธร; born February 14, 1982, in Bangkok) is a Thai former swimmer, who specialized in long-distance freestyle but also competed in backstroke and individual medley. He is a single-time Olympian (2000), and a multiple-time SEA Games gold medalist. Sethsothorn is also the brother of 1998 Asian Games champion Torlarp Sethsothorn.

Before his Olympic debut, Sethsothorn left his native country Thailand for a two-year residency in the United States. He lived with his uncle in Cypress, California, and later studied at the Mission Viejo High School in Mission Viejo, California. He also trained, along with two other swimmers Juan Veloz of Mexico and Carlo Piccio of the Philippines, for Davie Nadadores Club under head coach Terry Stoddard. While swimming for his respective club, Sethsothorn had earned numerous high school titles including his first triumph from the Mission Viejo Invitational in 2000.

Sethsothorn competed in four individual events, as an 18-year-old, at the 2000 Summer Olympics in Sydney. He posted a FINA A-standard of 4:22.61 (400 m individual medley) from the U.S. National Championships in Federal Way, Washington. In the 400 m freestyle, held on the first day of the Games, Sethsothorn posted a lifetime best of 3:56.68 to lead the third heat, finishing twenty-fourth from the prelims. The following day, in the 400 m individual medley, Sethsothorn placed thirty-second in a time of 4:28.42, almost six seconds off his entry time. Three days later, in the 200 m backstroke, Sethsothorn placed thirty-fifth on the morning prelims. Swimming in heat two, he picked up a fourth spot by one hundredth of a second (0.01) behind Argentina's Eduardo Germán Otero in 2:05.52. In his final event, 1500 m freestyle, Sethsothorn challenged seven other swimmers in heat three, including top favorites Ricardo Monasterio of Venezuela and Spyridon Gianniotis of Greece. He raced to fourth place and twenty-eighth overall by almost ten seconds behind Gianniotis in 15:39.60.

At the 2001 Southeast Asian Games in Kuala Lumpur, Malaysia, Sethsothorn won a total of three gold medals each in the 400 m individual medley (4:29.43), 400 m freestyle (3:58.18), and 1500 m freestyle (15:49.72).
