= Dulyarit Phuangthong =

Thai swimmer (born 1977)

Personal information
- Full name: Dulyarit Phuangthong
- Nickname: Goh
- National team: Thailand
- Born: 31 December 1977 (age 48) Bangkok, Thailand
- Height: 1.80 m (5 ft 11 in)
- Weight: 82 kg (181 lb)

Sport
- Sport: Swimming
- Strokes: Backstroke, butterfly, medley
Medal record
Men's swimming
Representing Thailand
Southeast Asian Games
Gold medal – first place	2001 Kuala Lumpur	200 m medley
Silver medal – second place	2001 Kuala Lumpur	100 m backstroke
Silver medal – second place	2001 Kuala Lumpur	4×200 m freestyle

Dulyarit "Goh" Phuangthong (Thai: ดุลยฤทธิ์ พวงทอง; born December 31, 1977; nickname: 'Goh') is a Thai former professional swimmer who specialized in backstroke, butterfly and individual medley events. He is a two-time Olympian (1996 and 2000), a finalist in the 100m backstroke at the 2002 Asian Games, and a multiple-time medalist at the Southeast Asian Games since his debut in 1995.

Phuangthong's Olympic debut came at the 1996 Summer Olympics in Atlanta. There he finished thirty-eighth in the 100m backstroke (58.32), and twenty-sixth in the 200m backstroke (2:05.26). Phuangthong also teamed up with Torlarp Sethsothorn, Ratapong Sirisanont, and Niti Intharapichai in the 4×100m medley relay. Leading off the backstroke leg in heat four, Phuangthong recorded a time of 59.13, but the Thais settled for sixth place and twenty-second overall in a final time of 3:56.80.

At the 2000 Summer Olympics in Sydney, Phuangthong decided to drop half of his backstroke double, and experiment with the 200m butterfly. He posted FINA B-standards of 58.48 (100m backstroke) and 2:03.11 (200m butterfly) from the Southeast Asian Games in Bandar Seri Begawan, Brunei. On the second day of the Games, Phuangthong placed forty-third in the 100m backstroke. Swimming in heat two, he raced to third place in a matching entry time of 58.48, just a 1.36-second deficit behind winner Sung Min of South Korea. The following day, in the 200m butterfly, Phuangthong challenged seven other swimmers in the same heat, including 19-year-olds Zoran Lazarovski of Macedonia and Juan Pablo Valdivieso of Peru. He held off Croatia's Lovrenco Franičević to earn a fifth spot and thirty-eighth overall in 2:04.15.

At the 2001 Southeast Asian Games in Kuala Lumpur, Malaysia, Phuangthong collected a total of three medals: a gold in the 200m individual medley (2:05.75), and two silvers in the 100m backstroke (57.71), and as a member of the Thailand team, in the 4×200m freestyle relay (7:39.46).

At the 2002 Asian Games in Busan, South Korea, Phuangthong finished seventh in the 100m backstroke at 59.04, holding off Singapore's Gerald Koh by 0.37 seconds. Shortly after the Games, Phuangthong announced his retirement from professional swimming.

Phuangthong is now working as a swimming coach at St Andrews International School Bangkok.
