= Anthony Ang =

Malaysian swimmer

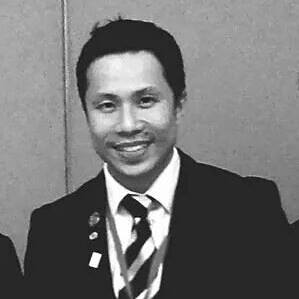

Personal information
- Full name: Anthony Ang Kang Keam
- Nickname: Anthony
- National team: Malaysia
- Born: 6 December 1978 (age 47)
- Height: 1.72 m (5 ft 8 in)
- Weight: 70 kg (154 lb)

Sport
- Sport: Swimming
- Strokes: Butterfly
- College team: Florida State University, University of Minnesota (U.S.)
- Coach: Kelly Kremer (U.S.)
Medal record
Men's swimming
Representing Malaysia
Southeast Asian Games
Gold medal – first place	2001 Kuala Lumpur	100 m butterfly
Gold medal – first place	2001 Kuala Lumpur	200 m butterfly
Silver medal – second place	1999 Brunei	100 m butterfly

Anthony Ang Kang Keam (born 6 December 1978) is a Malaysian former swimmer, who specialised in butterfly events. He is a two-time Olympian (1996 and 2000), a double SEA Games titleholder in a butterfly double, a Bolles School graduate, and a member of Florida State University (1998-1999) and University of Minnesota (2000-2002) swimming and diving team while studying in the United States.

Ang accepted an athletic scholarship to attend the Florida State University in Tallahassee, Florida for 2 seasons (1998 & 1999) and later joined University of Minnesota in Minneapolis, Minnesota, where he played for the Minnesota Golden Gophers under head coach Kelly Kremer. In the year 2001 edition of Big Ten Men's Swimming and Diving Championships, he came in first in the 200-yard butterfly (1:44.25) along with rewriting both the varsity and pool record. At the 2001 NCAA Men's Swimming and Diving Championships, he powered home with top finishes, as the only Gopher, in the 100-yard butterfly (49.09) and the 200-yard butterfly (1:46.21).

Ang made his first Malaysian team, as an eighteen-year-old teen, at the 1996 Summer Olympics in Atlanta. There, he failed to reach the top 16 final in any of his individual events, finishing forty-fifth in the 100 m butterfly (56.41), and thirty-first in the 200 m butterfly (2:04.01). He also placed twentieth, along with his Malaysian teammates Alex Lim, Elvin Chia, and Wan Azlan Abdullah, in the 4 × 100 m medley relay (3:56.24).

At the 2000 Summer Olympics in Sydney, Ang competed again in three swimming events, including a butterfly double. He achieved FINA B-standards of 56.47 (100 m butterfly) and 2:02.72 (200 m butterfly) from the Southeast Asian Games in Bandar Seri Begawan, Brunei. In his first event, 200 m butterfly, Ang posted a lifetime best of 2:00.12 to lead the second heat, but missed the semifinals by 0.71 of a second with a twenty-second-place effort. Three days later, in the 100 m butterfly, Ang placed thirty-sixth on the morning prelims. He established a Malaysian record of 55.26 to blister the field with another top finish in heat one. Ang also teamed up with Chia, Lim, and newcomer Allen Ong in the 4 × 100 m medley relay. Swimming a butterfly leg in heat one, Ang recorded a split of 55.70, but the Malaysians settled only for last place and twenty-second overall in a final time of 3:48.32.

When Malaysia hosted the 2001 Southeast Asian Games in Kuala Lumpur, Ang came up with a spectacular swim to strike a butterfly double in front of a massive home crowd, capturing two gold medals each in the 100 m butterfly (55.40) and 200 m butterfly (2:01.84).
