= Torlarp Sethsothorn =

Thai swimmer (born 1979)

Personal information
- Born: September 24, 1979 (age 46)

Sport
- Sport: Swimming
Medal record
Representing Thailand
Asian Games
Gold medal – first place	1998 Bangkok	400m freestyle
Silver medal – second place	1998 Bangkok	200m freestyle
Silver medal – second place	1998 Bangkok	1500m freestyle
Bronze medal – third place	1994 Hiroshima	4x200m freestyle relay
SEA Games
Gold medal – first place	1995 Chiang Mai	200m freestyle
Gold medal – first place	1995 Chiang Mai	400m freestyle
Gold medal – first place	1995 Chiang Mai	1500m freestyle
Gold medal – first place	1995 Chiang Mai	4x200m freestyle

Torlarp Sethsothorn (born 24 September 1979) is a Thai former swimmer who competed in the 1996 Summer Olympics.
