= Elvin Chia =

Malaysian swimmer (born 1977)

Personal information
- Full name: Elvin Chia Tshun Thau
- Nationality: Malaysia
- Born: 26 April 1977 (age 49) Sandakan, Sabah
- Height: 6 ft 3 in (1.91 m)
- Weight: 194 lb (88 kg)

Sport
- Sport: Swimming
- Strokes: Breaststroke
Medal record
Men's Swimming
Representing Malaysia
Asian Games
Bronze medal – third place	1998 Bangkok	100m breaststroke
SEA Games
Gold medal – first place	1997 Jakarta	100m breaststroke
Gold medal – first place	1999 Brunei	100m breaststroke
Gold medal – first place	1999 Brunei	200m breaststroke
Gold medal – first place	2001 Kuala Lumpur	100m breaststroke
Gold medal – first place	2001 Kuala Lumpur	200m breaststroke
Silver medal – second place	1995 Chiang Mai	200m breaststroke
Silver medal – second place	1995 Chiang Mai	4x100m medley relay
Silver medal – second place	1997 Jakarta	200m breaststroke
Bronze medal – third place	1995 Chiang Mai	100m breaststroke

Elvin Chia Tshun Thau (born 26 April 1977) is a retired Malaysian swimmer. He was born in Sandakan, Sabah. He was the Malaysian Olympian of the Year in 1999. He also competed at the Summer Olympic Games: 1996 and 2000.
