= Alex Lim =

Malaysian swimmer (born 1980)

Personal information
- Full name: Lim Keng Liat
- Nationality: Malaysia
- Born: 29 August 1980 (age 46) Sandakan, Sabah
- Height: 5 ft 10 in (1.78 m)
- Weight: 139 lb (63 kg)

Sport
- Sport: Swimming
- Strokes: Backstroke
Medal record
Men's Swimming
Representing Malaysia
Commonwealth Games
| Silver medal – second place | 2002 Manchester | 50m backstroke |
| Bronze medal – third place | 2002 Manchester | 100m backstroke |
Asian Games
| Gold medal – first place | 1998 Bangkok | 100m backstroke |
| Silver medal – second place | 1998 Bangkok | 200m backstroke |
| Silver medal – second place | 2002 Busan | 100m backstroke |
SEA Games
| Gold medal – first place | 1997 Jakarta | 200m butterfly |
| Gold medal – first place | 1999 Brunei | 100m backstroke |
| Gold medal – first place | 1999 Brunei | 200m backstroke |
| Gold medal – first place | 2001 Kuala Lumpur | 100m backstroke |
| Gold medal – first place | 2001 Kuala Lumpur | 200m backstroke |
| Gold medal – first place | 2003 Hanoi | 100m backstroke |
| Gold medal – first place | 2003 Hanoi | 200m backstroke |
| Gold medal – first place | 2003 Hanoi | 100m butterfly |
| Gold medal – first place | 2005 Laguna | 100m backstroke |
| Gold medal – first place | 2005 Laguna | 200m backstroke |
| Silver medal – second place | 1995 Chiang Mai | 4x100m medley relay |
| Silver medal – second place | 1997 Jakarta | 100m backstroke |
| Silver medal – second place | 1997 Jakarta | 200m backstroke |
| Silver medal – second place | 1997 Jakarta | 100m butterfly |
| Silver medal – second place | 1999 Brunei | 200m butterfly |
| Bronze medal – third place | 2005 Laguna | 100m butterfly |

Alex Lim Keng Liat (born 29 August 1980) is a retired Malaysian swimmer. He was born in Sandakan, Sabah. He was awarded the National Sportsman of the Year and Olympian of the Year in 1998. In 2009, he was inducted into the Olympic Council of Malaysia (OCM) Hall of Fame.

== Career ==
Lim attended The Bolles School in Jacksonville for his prep tenure and had unparalleled success. In 1998, 1999, and 2000, Lim was the national high school champion in both the 100 butterfly and 100 backstroke, and he twice set the 100 backstroke national record during his time with the Bulldogs.

Alex Lim first appeared in Southeast Asia Games at the age of 15 in 1995. At the 1998 Asian Games, he won Malaysia's first swimming gold medal in 100m backstroke as well as breaking the games record. He was the only Malaysian swimmer to date who clinched a swimming medal in Commonwealth Games. At the 2002 Commonwealth Games, he won the silver medal in 50m backstroke where his time was just 0.02 seconds behind the former Australian world champion, Matt Welsh. He also won the bronze medal in 100m backstroke.

He qualified for the 1996 Summer Olympics, 2000 Summer Olympics, and 2004 Summer Olympics. In the 2004 Summer Olympics, he became the first and only Malaysian to qualify for the semi-finals in swimming at Olympics. He was also the first and only Malaysian to enter the final in the 100m backstroke at the FINA World Swimming Championships Barcelona, Spain.

== Awards ==
- 1998 Malaysian Sportman of the Year
- 1998 Malaysian Olympian of the Year
- OCM Hall of Fame

== Honour ==
=== Honour of Malaysia ===
- Malaysia :
  - Member of the Order of the Defender of the Realm (A.M.N.) (2000)

== See also ==
- List of Commonwealth Games medallists in swimming (men)
