= 1997 SEA Games =

Multi-sport event in Jakarta, Indonesia

XIX Southeast Asian Games
- Host city: Jakarta, Indonesia
- Nations: 10
- Athletes: 4696
- Events: 440 in 34 sports
- Opening: 11 October 1997
- Closing: 19 October 1997
- Opened by: Soeharto; President of Indonesia
- Torch lighter: Ferry Sonneville
- Ceremony venue: Senayan Main Stadium
- Website: 1997 Southeast Asian Games

The 1997 Southeast Asian Games (Indonesian: Pesta Olahraga Asia Tenggara 1997), officially known as the 19th Southeast Asian Games (Indonesian: Pesta Olahraga Asia Tenggara ke-19; the 19th SEA Games), were a Southeast Asian multi-sport event held in Jakarta, Indonesia. This was the third time that Indonesia hosted the games. Jakarta also hosted the SEA Games in 1979 and 1987.

Around 4,696 athletes from 10 participating nations participated at the games, which featured 440 events in 34 sports. The games were held from 11 to 19 October 1997, although several events had commenced from 5 October 1997. The games was opened by Soeharto, the President of Indonesia at the Gelora Bung Karno Stadium, which was then known at the time as Senayan Sports Stadium.

The final medal tally was led by hosts Indonesia, followed by Thailand and Malaysia. Several Games and national records were broken during the games. The games were deemed generally successful with the rising standard of competition amongst the Southeast Asian nations.

Host cities of the 1997 Southeast Asian Games

== Development and preparation ==
The Organizing Committee of the 19th SEA Games Jakarta 1997 (JASOC) led by Wismoyo Arismunandar was formed to oversee the staging of the games.

=== Venues ===
The 1997 Southeast Asian Games used a mix of new, existing and temporary venues. Some major retrofitting work were done in most venues, although they had been used to host major multi-disciplinary events such as the 1962 Asian Games, the 1979 Southeast Asian Games and the 1987 Southeast Asian Games.

At the centrepiece of the activities was the Gelora Bung Karno Sports Complex, then Senayan Sports Complex which was completed on 24 July 1962. Incorporating the 120,800-seat national stadium at that time, it hosted most of the events.

A games village was not built. Instead, a "village in the city" concept saw athletes and officials housed in were housed in hotels in Jakarta and West Java. Besides being physically near to the sport venues, it was hoped that it will add vibe to both provinces and reduce post-games costs in converting a dedicated games village to other uses.

There were 35 venues for the games, 29 in Jakarta and 6 in West Java.

Province	Competition Venue	Sports
Jakarta	Senayan Sports Complex
Jakarta	Main Stadium	Athletics, Football (Men: group and knockout stage), Opening and closing ceremony
Jakarta	Archery Field	Archery
Jakarta	Aquatics Centre	Aquatics (Swimming, Synchronised Swimming, Diving, Water polo)
Jakarta	Badminton Hall	Badminton (Knockout stage)
Jakarta	Basketball Hall	Basketball (Knockout stage)
Jakarta	Istora	Badminton (Final), Basketball (Final), Volleyball (Indoor)
Jakarta	Tennis Indoor Stadium	Bodybuilding, Weightlifting
Jakarta	Gymnasium A	Fencing
Jakarta	Gymnasium B	Judo
Jakarta	Gymnasium C	Wrestling
Jakarta	Shooting Range	Shooting
Jakarta	Softball Field	Softball
Jakarta	Squash Hall	Squash
Jakarta	Tennis Court	Tennis
Jakarta	Volleyball Court	Volleyball (Beach)
Jakarta	Others
Jakarta	Jakarta International Expo	Billiards and snooker, Wushu
Jakarta	Jakarta–Cikampek Toll Road	Cycling (Road)
Jakarta	Rawamangun Velodrome	Cycling (Track)
Jakarta	Lebak Bulus Stadium	Football (Men: Group stage)
Jakarta	Matoa Nasional Golf Course, Ciganjur	Golf
Jakarta	Gymnastics Hall DKI, Jalan Radin Inten	Gymnastics
Jakarta	North Jakarta Sports Hall, Jalan Yos Sudarso	Karate
Jakarta	Padepokan Pencak Silat Indonesia	Pencak silat
Jakarta	East Jakarta Sports Hall	Sepak takraw
Jakarta	Pertamina Sports Hall, Simprug	Table tennis
Jakarta	Bulungan Sports Hall	Taekwondo
Jakarta	Pluit Bowling Centre Mega Mall, Pluit	Bowling
Jakarta	Sunter Lake, North Jakarta	Water Skiing
Jakarta	Ancol Dreamland	Sailing
West Java
West Java	Pajajaran Stadium	Football (Women)
West Java	Cilodong	Shooting
West Java	Rangga Wulung Hill, Subang	Cycling (Mountain Bike)
West Java	Student Sport Hall, Kuningan	Boxing
West Java	Jatiluhur Dam	Canoeing, Rowing, Traditional boat race
West Java	Subang-Tangkuban Perahu	Cycling (Road)

== Marketing ==
=== Logo ===
Hanuman, the white monkey character in the Ramayana epic, the official mascot of the games.

The official logo for the 1997 Games is an interpretation of three flames, and two torch rings, which reflects the Indonesian state philosophy of the Pancasila. The upward flames represent the aspiration of the participating nations to achieve the highest standards at the Jakarta SEA Games.

The colours of red, blue, and yellow are the basic colours of the flame. The color red represents the "spirit" of the Games, while the blue represents the "dynamism" of the Games, and the yellow represents the "hope" the Games brings to the athletes and people of Southeast Asia. The six-ring chain symbol, the emblem of the Southeast Asian Games Federation, symbolizes the Games' six founding nations and the SEA Games itself, and its gold colour represents the quality and solidarity of the Games.

The logo is the last one to feature the organization's 6-ring emblem, just before it was replaced by its new 10-ring symbol (reflecting the present number of its member nations at the time), which was then introduced at the next edition in 1999.

=== Mascot ===
The mascot of the 1997 Southeast Asian Games is a Ramayana epic character named "Hanuman". The Ramayana, known in Java, Indonesia as Kakawin Ramayana, is an Indian epic, which spread into Southeast Asia including the Indonesian archipelago during the ancient times. It does not only exists in oral and literary works, but also serves as the underlying theme for art performances and as the inspiration for other works, such as sculptures, paintings and literature. According to the Ramayana epic, he is an ardent devotee of Rama who fighting alongside him in the face of conflict and struggle and is always successful in accomplishing his tasks due to his superiority in speed, strength and altitude. The tasks managed by Hanuman in the epic includes: travel to Alengka (Lanka) and back in a day, fought in several battles and able to fly in the clouds when performing duties. Hanuman exist in the form of a white monkey in the Javanese adaptation of the epic and is one of the characters featured in the Wayang Shadow Puppet Show, known to the locals with the title Sang Kera Pemuja Dewa Rama (The mighty devotee ape of Rama). The adoption of Hanuman as the games mascot is to promote the games motto: "May the best man win", a phrase used before a competition to hope that the most deserving person wins. The cotton white colour of his body hair, a colour which symbolises sincerity and innocence, while the gold and black colour represents his attribute as a Wayang character. His cotton white colour represents sportsmanship spirit, while the yellow and black colour represents quality.

=== Sponsors ===
A total of 31 sponsors sponsored the games.

- Pos Indonesia
- Zyrex
- Sybase
- Kesakuno Reyakasa
- Panasonic
- Tiger Beer
- Konica (now Konica Minolta)
- Satelindo
- Seiko
- Nike, Inc.
- Milo
- Dharmala Intiland
- Aqua
- Mikasa Sports
- Kompas
- Nikon
- Wall's
- Kymco
- Djarum
- Gatorade
- Indomie
- Krating Daeng
- Spotec
- Pfizer
- Yonex
- Motorola
- Mulia
- IndoMobil Group
- Telkomsel
- Citra Sari Makmur
- SingNet
- Asaba
- Lucent
- Intel

== The Games ==
=== Opening ceremony ===
The opening ceremony was held at the Senayan Sports Stadium on 11 October 1997 at 19:00 (WIB). It features the cultural dance show "Gebyar Nusantara"

=== Closing ceremony ===
The closing ceremony was held at the Senayan Sports Stadium on 19 October 1997 at 19:00 (WIB).

=== Participating nations ===
- Brunei (296 athletes)
- Cambodia (85)
- Indonesia (916) (Host)
- Laos (104)
- Malaysia (671)
- Myanmar (294)
- Philippines (782)
- Singapore (446)
- Thailand (705)
- Vietnam (397)

=== Sports ===
- Aquatics
  - Diving (4)
  - Swimming (32)
  - Synchronised swimming (2)
  - Water polo (1)
- Archery (4)
- Athletics (44)
- Badminton (7)
- Basketball (2)
- Billiards and snooker (12)
- Bodybuilding (8)
- Bowling (12)
- Boxing (11)
- Canoeing (12)
- Cycling (16)
- Fencing (10)
- Football (2)
- Golf (4)
- Gymnastics (16)
- Hockey (2)
- Judo (16)
- Karate (19)
- Pencak silat (20)
- Rowing (11)
- Sailing (15)
- Sepak takraw (4)
- Shooting (42)
- Softball (2)
- Squash (4)
- Table tennis (7)
- Taekwondo (16)
- Tennis (7)
- Traditional boat race (8)
- Volleyball (4)
- Waterskiing (6)
- Weightlifting (19)
- Wrestling (20)
- Wushu (19)

== Medal table ==
* Host nation (Indonesia)

Rank	Nation	Gold	Silver	Bronze	Total
1	Indonesia (INA)*	194	101	115	410
2	Thailand (THA)	83	97	78	258
3	Malaysia (MAS)	55	68	75	198
4	Philippines (PHI)	43	56	108	207
5	Vietnam (VIE)	35	48	50	133
6	Singapore (SIN)	30	26	50	106
7	Myanmar (MYA)	8	34	44	86
8	Brunei (BRU)	0	2	8	10
9	Laos (LAO)	0	0	7	7
10	Cambodia (CAM)	0	0	6	6
Totals (10 entries)		448	432	541	1,421

Preceded by Chiang Mai	Southeast Asian Games; Jakarta; XIX Southeast Asian Games (1997)	Succeeded by Bandar Seri Begawan
