= 1995 SEA Games =

Multi-sport event in Chiang Mai, Thailand

XVIII Southeast Asian Games
- Host city: Chiang Mai, Thailand
- Nations: 10
- Athletes: 3262
- Sport: 28
- Opening: 9 December 1995
- Closing: 17 December 1995
- Opened by: Vajiralongkorn; Crown Prince of Thailand
- Closed by: Prem Tinsulanonda; Privy Councillor of Thailand
- Athlete's Oath: Ratapong Sirisanont
- Torch lighter: Kiatisuk Senamuang; Tamarine Tanasugarn
- Ceremony venue: 700th Anniversary Stadium

The 1995 Southeast Asian Games, officially known as the 18th Southeast Asian Games, Chiang Mai, 1995 (Thai: การแข่งขันกีฬาซีเกมส์ ครั้งที่ 18 เชียงใหม่ 1995), was a Southeast Asian multi-sport event held in Chiang Mai, Thailand, from 9 to 17 December 1995. It marked the first time that a non-capital city hosted the biennial sporting event. Chiang Mai became the second Thai city to host the Southeast Asian Games after the capital Bangkok. The games were opened and closed by Vajiralongkorn, then the Crown Prince of Thailand, making him the first non–head of state to officiate the opening of the SEA Games, representing his father King Bhumibol Adulyadej. Cambodia returned to the SEA Games for the first time since 1973, all ten members of the federation participated in the SEA Games for the first time.

This was the fifth time that Thailand hosted the Games. The country had previously staged the event in 1959, 1967, 1975, and 1985, all held in Bangkok. A total of approximately 3,262 athletes from 10 participating nations competed in the Games, which featured 28 sports.

The final medal tally was led by the host nation Thailand, followed by Indonesia and the Philippines.

== Organisation ==
=== Development and preparation ===
The Chiang Mai SEA Games Organising Committee (CMSOC) was formed to oversee the staging of the games.

=== Venues ===
The 18th Southeast Asian Games had 23 venues for the games, 19 in Chiang Mai, 3 in Chonburi and 1 in Lamphun.

| Province | Competition venue | Sports |
| Chiang Mai | 700th Anniversary Sport Complex |
| Chiang Mai | Main Stadium | Opening and Closing Ceremony, Athletics, Football |
| Chiang Mai | Aquatics Centre | Aquatics Sport |
| Chiang Mai | Gymnasium 1 | Volleyball |
| Chiang Mai | Gymnasium 2 | Basketball |
| Chiang Mai | Gymnasium 3 | Badminton, Sepak Takraw |
| Chiang Mai | Shooting Range | Shooting |
| Chiang Mai | Tennis Court | Tennis |
| Chiang Mai | Velodrome | Cycling |
| Chiang Mai | Other |
| Chiang Mai | Chiang Mai-Lamphun Golf Course | Golf |
| Chiang Mai | Chiang Mai University | Archery, Table Tennis |
| Chiang Mai | Lanna Poly Technical School | Taekwondo |
| Chiang Mai | Mae Joe Institute of Agricultural Technology | Gymnastic, Hockey |
| Chiang Mai | Mae Kuang Dam | Rowing |
| Chiang Mai | Montfort College | Judo |
| Chiang Mai | Municipal Sport Complex | Rugby, Weightlifting |
| Chiang Mai | Pack Squadron Riding Ground | Equestrian |
| Chiang Mai | Pang Suan Kaew Hotel | Billiards and Snooker |
| Chiang Mai | Payap University | Boxing |
| Chiang Mai | Wattanothai Payap School | Fencing |
Chonburi
| Chonburi | Ambassador Jomtien Hotel | Squash |
| Chonburi | Dong Tan Beach-Sattahip Bay | Sailing |
| Chonburi | Star Bowl | Bowling |
| Lamphun | Lamphun Sport Complex | Football, Pencak Silat |

== Marketing ==
=== Logo ===
Sawasdee, the Siamese cat, the official mascot of the games

The logo of the 1995 Southeast Asian Games is an image of a Bo Sang umbrella which symbolises Chiang Mai as the host of the Southeast Asian Games. The image of the umbrella also resembles a running athlete, which represents the courage and determination of the games participating athletes and the participating athletes themselves. The colours of the umbrella blue, yellow, red, black and green are colours of the Olympic movement and represents the Olympic and sportsmanship spirit of the participating athletes. The 6-ring chain, the logo of the Southeast Asian Games Federation, represents the six founding nations of the Southeast Asian Games and the Southeast Asian Games itself.

=== Mascot ===
The Games' mascot is a Siamese cat named Sawasdee (Thai: สวัสดี) who takes a Bo Sang umbrella with him. The Siamese cat is one of the several varieties of cat native to Thailand. Its name Sawasdee is a word often spoken in Thai as a greeting or farewell in Thailand. The umbrella it holds represents Chiang Mai as a whole.

=== Theme song ===
The Games' theme song is Win It In Your Heart, composed by Sma Suaysod and Nonthiya Jiewbangpa.

== The games ==
=== Participating nations ===
- Brunei
- Cambodia
- Indonesia
- Laos
- Malaysia
- Myanmar
- Philippines
- Singapore
- Thailand (Host)
- Vietnam

=== Sports ===
- Aquatics
- Archery
- Athletics
- Badminton
- Basketball
- Billiards and snooker
- Bowling
- Boxing
- Cycling
- Equestrian
- Fencing
- Football
- Golf
- Gymnastics
- Hockey
- Judo
- Pencak silat
- Rowing
- Rugby union
- Sailing
- Sepak takraw
- Shooting
- Squash
- Table tennis
- Taekwondo
- Tennis
- Volleyball
- Weightlifting

== Medal table ==
* Host nation (Thailand)

| Rank | Nation | Gold | Silver | Bronze | Total |
|---|---|---|---|---|---|
| 1 | Thailand (THA)* | 157 | 98 | 91 | 346 |
| 2 | Indonesia (INA) | 77 | 67 | 77 | 221 |
| 3 | Philippines (PHI) | 33 | 48 | 62 | 143 |
| 4 | Malaysia (MAS) | 31 | 49 | 69 | 149 |
| 5 | Singapore (SIN) | 26 | 27 | 42 | 95 |
| 6 | Vietnam (VIE) | 10 | 18 | 24 | 52 |
| 7 | Myanmar (MYA) | 4 | 21 | 37 | 62 |
| 8 | Brunei (BRU) | 0 | 2 | 6 | 8 |
| 9 | Laos (LAO) | 0 | 1 | 6 | 7 |
| 10 | Cambodia (CAM) | 0 | 0 | 2 | 2 |
| Totals (10 entries) | | 338 | 331 | 416 | 1,085 |

| Preceded by Singapore | Southeast Asian Games; Chiang Mai; XVIII Southeast Asian Games (1995) | Succeeded by Jakarta |
