= Aquatics at the 1999 SEA Games =

Aquatics at the 1999 Southeast Asian Games included swimming, diving and water polo events. The three sports of aquatics were held at Hassanal Bolkiah Aquatics Center in Bandar Seri Begawan, Brunei Darussalam. Aquatics events was held between 8 August to 13 August.

== Medal winners ==
=== Swimming ===
Men's events

Event	Gold		Silver		Bronze	
50 m freestyle	(Indonesia) Richard Sam Bera	23.49	(Indonesia) Wisnu Wardhana	23.71	(Singapore) Leslie Kwok	23.79
100 m freestyle	(Indonesia) Richard Sam Bera	51.03	(Malaysia) Allen Ong Hou Ming	51.73	(Singapore) Mark Chay	51.95
200 m freestyle	(Thailand) Vicha Ratanachote	1:53.43	(Singapore) Mark Chay	1:53.98	(Singapore) Sng Ju Wei	1:54.25
400 m freestyle	(Malaysia) Dieung Manggang	4:00.34	(Singapore) Sng Ju Wei	4:04.55	(Thailand) Torwai Sethsothorn	4:05.17
1500 m freestyle	(Malaysia) Dieung Manggang	15:57.47	(Philippines) Carlo Piccio	15:57.85	(Indonesia) Steven Chandra	16:02.63
100 m backstroke	(Malaysia) Alex Lim	56.20	(Singapore) Gary Tan	58.00	(Indonesia) Felix Christiadi Sutanto	59.27
200 m backstroke	(Malaysia) Alex Lim	2:02.09	(Singapore) Gary Tan	2:05.79	(Indonesia) Felix Christiadi Sutanto	2:08.07
100 m breaststroke	(Malaysia) Elvin Chia Tshun Thau	1:02.96	(Singapore) Daniel Liew	1:04.95	(Thailand) Non Poonchaisri	1:05.95
200 m breaststroke	(Malaysia) Elvin Chia Tshun Thau	2:15.62	(Thailand) Ratapong Sirisanont	2:17.64	(Indonesia) Muhammad Akbar Nasution	2:20.59
100 m butterfly	(Indonesia) Albert Christiadi Sutanto	56.25	(Malaysia) Anthony Ang	56.47	(Indonesia) Wisnu Wardhana	56.72
200 m butterfly	(Indonesia) Albert Christiadi Sutanto	2:02.06	(Malaysia) Alex Lim	2:02.35	(Thailand) Ratapong Sirisanont	2:02.71
200 m individual medley	(Thailand) Ratapong Sirisanont	2:04.26	(Thailand) Pathunyu Yimsomruay	2:04.99	(Indonesia) Felix Christiadi Sutanto	2:09.36
400 m individual medley	(Thailand) Ratapong Sirisanont	4:25.16	(Indonesia) Albert Christiadi Sutanto	4:25.19	(Thailand) Torwai Sethsothorn	4:31.21
4 × 100 m freestyle relay	Indonesia	3:27.69	Singapore	3:28.12	Malaysia	3:29.62
4 × 200 m freestyle relay	Thailand	7:38.89	Singapore		Indonesia	
4 × 100 m medley relay	Malaysia	3:45.61	Thailand	3:50.45	Singapore	3:55.56

Women's events

Event	Gold		Silver		Bronze	
50 m freestyle	(Singapore) Joscelin Yeo Wei Ling	26.23	(Thailand) Pilin Tachakittiranan	27.01	(Myanmar) Moe Thu Aung	27.41
100 m freestyle	(Singapore) Joscelin Yeo Wei Ling	56.05	(Thailand) Pilin Tachakittiranan	58.02	(Singapore) Christel Bouvron Mei Yen	58.85
200 m freestyle	(Thailand) Pilin Tachakittiranan	2:04.60	(Singapore) Christel Bouvron Mei Yen	2:06.35	(Malaysia) Teo Mun Yee	2:09.78
400 m freestyle	(Thailand) Pilin Tachakittiranan	4:19.43	(Singapore) Christel Bouvron Mei Yen	4:21.87	(Singapore) Joscelin Yeo Wei Ling	4:28.59
800 m freestyle	(Thailand) Pilin Tachakittiranan	8:59.45	(Malaysia) Sia Wai Yen	9:02.51	(Singapore) Christel Bouvron Mei Yen	9:09.99
100 m backstroke	(Thailand) Chonlathorn Vorathamrong	1:05.46	(Indonesia) Elsa Manora Nasution	1:05.69	(Philippines) Lizza Danila	1:06.19
200 m backstroke	(Thailand) Chonlathorn Vorathamrong	2:20.05	(Philippines) Lizza Danila	2:21.57	(Indonesia) Elsa Manora Nasution	2:23.40
100 m breaststroke	(Singapore) Joscelin Yeo Wei Ling	1:11.36	(Philippines) Kathy Echeverri	1:13.83	(Malaysia) Siow Yi Ting	1:14.88
200 m breaststroke	(Singapore) Nicolette Teo	2:36.27	(Thailand) Tachaphorn Iamsanitamorn	2:42.90	(Malaysia) Siow Yi Ting	2:43.56
100 m butterfly	(Singapore) Joscelin Yeo Wei Ling	1:00.44	(Thailand) Praphalsai Minpraphal	1:01.16	(Myanmar) Moe Thu Aung	1:03.65
200 m butterfly	(Thailand) Praphalsai Minpraphal	2:14.54	(Thailand) Pilin Tachakittiranan	2:17.01	(Singapore) Christel Bouvron Mei Yen	2:19.71
200 m individual medley	(Singapore) Joscelin Yeo Wei Ling	2:17.17	(Malaysia) Sia Wai Yen	2:20.64	(Thailand) Ravee Inporn Udom	2:23.99
400 m individual medley	(Singapore) Joscelin Yeo Wei Ling	4:51.87	(Malaysia) Sia Wai Yen	4:52.52	(Thailand) Duangruthai Thammapanya	5:04.70
4 × 100 m freestyle relay	Thailand	3:53.33	Singapore	3:56.99	Indonesia	4:00.04
4 × 200 m freestyle relay	Thailand	8:25.51	Singapore	8:32.06	Indonesia	8:47.41
4 × 100 m medley relay	Thailand	4:20.76	Malaysia	4:27.07	Singapore	4:29.37

=== Diving ===
Event	Gold		Silver		Bronze	
Men's 3 m springboard	(Malaysia) Yeoh Ken Nee	582.05	(Thailand) Suchart Pichi	535.20	(Thailand) Atthain Anupan	526.05
Men's 10 m platform	(Malaysia) Yeoh Ken Nee	577.15	(Indonesia) Husaini Noor	519.55	(Indonesia) Muhammad Nasrullah	497.35
Women's 3 m springboard	(Malaysia) Farah Begum Abdullah	456.50	(Malaysia) Leong Mun Yee	444.95	(Indonesia) Eka Purnama Indah	
Women's 10 m platform	(Indonesia) Shenny Ratna Amelia	430.90	(Thailand) Tammaoros Sukruthai	420.90	(Malaysia) Leong Mun Yee	410.70

=== Water polo ===
Event	Gold	Silver	Bronze
Men's	Singapore	Philippines	Indonesia
