= Swimming at the 2002 Asian Games – Women's 4 × 200 metre freestyle relay =

Women's 4 × 200 metre freestyle relay at the 2002 Asian Games
- Venue: Sajik Swimming Pool
- Date: 1 October 2002
- Competitors: 28 from 7 nations

Medalists
| gold medal | China; Yang Yu, Zhu Yingwen, Ju Jielei, Xu Yanwei |
| silver medal | Japan; Maki Mita, Tomoko Nagai, Norie Urabe, Sachiko Yamada |
| bronze medal | South Korea; Ha Eun-ju, Kim Ye-sul, Kim Hyun-joo, Shim Min-ji |

The women's 4 × 200 metre freestyle relay swimming competition at the 2002 Asian Games in Busan was held on 1 October at the Sajik Swimming Pool.

== Schedule ==
All times are Korea Standard Time (UTC+09:00)

| Date | Time | Event |
|---|---|---|
| Tuesday, 1 October 2002 | 19:00 | Final |

== Records ==
Prior to this competition, the existing world, Asian and Games records were as follows.

| World Record | East Germany | 7:55.47 | Strasbourg, France | 18 August 1987 |
| Asian Record | China | 7:56.52 | Guangzhou, China | 16 November 2001 |
| Games Record | China | 8:08.00 | Bangkok, Thailand | 7 December 1998 |

== Results ==
| Rank | Team | Time | Notes |
|---|---|---|---|
| 1st place, gold medalist(s) | China (CHN) | 7:58.46 | GR |
| | Zhu Yingwen | 2:00.31 | |
| | Tang Jingzhi | 2:00.89 | |
| | Xu Yanwei | 1:58.32 | |
| | Yang Yu | 1:58.94 | |
| 2nd place, silver medalist(s) | Japan (JPN) | 8:02.76 | |
| | Maki Mita | 2:00.77 | |
| | Tomoko Nagai | 2:00.59 | |
| | Sachiko Yamada | 1:59.63 | |
| | Norie Urabe | 2:01.77 | |
| 3rd place, bronze medalist(s) | South Korea (KOR) | 8:19.62 | |
| | Ha Eun-ju | 2:04.00 | |
| | Kim Ye-sul | 2:05.06 | |
| | Kim Hyun-joo | 2:05.60 | |
| | Shim Min-ji | 2:04.96 | |
| 4 | Thailand (THA) | 8:33.42 | |
| | Chorkaew Choompol | 2:07.67 | |
| | Piyaporn Tantiniti | 2:08.79 | |
| | Chonlathorn Vorathamrong | 2:09.78 | |
| | Pilin Tachakittiranan | 2:07.18 | |
| 5 | Singapore (SIN) | 8:37.07 | |
| | Christel Bouvron | 2:07.14 | |
| | U-Nice Chan | 2:08.96 | |
| | Nicolette Teo | 2:11.75 | |
| | Joscelin Yeo | 2:09.22 | |
| 6 | Hong Kong (HKG) | 8:41.32 | |
| | Flora Kong | 2:10.00 | |
| | Tang Hing Ting | 2:11.71 | |
| | Pang Shuk Mui | 2:09.91 | |
| | Sherry Tsai | 2:09.70 | |
| 7 | Pakistan (PAK) | 10:17.29 | |
| | Kiran Khan | 2:29.62 | |
| | Mahira Karim | 2:35.47 | |
| | Ayesha Tajwar | 2:35.92 | |
| | Sana Abdul Wahid | 2:36.28 | |
