= Swimming at the 2002 Asian Games – Women's 200 metre freestyle =

Women's 200 metre freestyle at the 2002 Asian Games
- Venue: Sajik Swimming Pool
- Date: 30 September 2002
- Competitors: 12 from 8 nations

Medalists
gold medal	Yang Yu	China
silver medal	Xu Yanwei	China
bronze medal	Tomoko Nagai	Japan

The women's 200 metre freestyle swimming competition at the 2002 Asian Games in Busan was held on 30 September at the Sajik Swimming Pool.

== Schedule ==
All times are Korea Standard Time (UTC+09:00)

Date	Time	Event
Monday, 30 September 2002	10:00	Heats
Monday, 30 September 2002	19:00	Final

== Records ==
Prior to this competition, the existing world, Asian and Games records were as follows.

World Record	Franziska van Almsick (GER)	1:56.64	Berlin, Germany	3 August 2002
Asian Record	Lü Bin (CHN)	1:56.89	Rome, Italy	6 September 1994
Games Record	Le Ying (CHN)	1:59.77	Hiroshima, Japan	4 October 1994

== Results ==
=== Heats ===
Rank	Heat	Athlete	Time	Notes
1	2	Yang Yu (CHN)	2:00.53	
2	2	Tomoko Nagai (JPN)	2:01.89	
3	1	Xu Yanwei (CHN)	2:02.28	
4	2	Kim Hyun-joo (KOR)	2:02.71	
5	1	Norie Urabe (JPN)	2:03.04	
6	1	Pilin Tachakittiranan (THA)	2:03.64	
7	2	Ha Eun-ju (KOR)	2:04.97	
8	1	Chorkaew Choompol (THA)	2:07.91	
9	1	Pang Shuk Mui (HKG)	2:11.21	
10	2	Võ Thị Thanh Vy (VIE)	2:12.80	
11	1	Heidi Ong (PHI)	2:15.55	
12	2	Christel Bouvron (SIN)	2:21.11	

=== Final ===
Rank	Athlete	Time	Notes
1st place, gold medalist(s)	Yang Yu (CHN)	1:58.43	GR
2nd place, silver medalist(s)	Xu Yanwei (CHN)	1:59.42	
3rd place, bronze medalist(s)	Tomoko Nagai (JPN)	2:00.52	
4	Kim Hyun-joo (KOR)	2:01.10	
5	Norie Urabe (JPN)	2:02.42	
6	Pilin Tachakittiranan (THA)	2:02.98	
7	Ha Eun-ju (KOR)	2:05.53	
8	Chorkaew Choompol (THA)	2:07.98	
