= Swimming at the 2002 Asian Games – Women's 4 × 100 metre freestyle relay =

Women's 4 × 100 metre freestyle relay at the 2002 Asian Games
- Venue: Sajik Swimming Pool
- Date: 3 October 2002
- Competitors: 28 from 7 nations

Medalists
gold medal	China; Yang Yu, Zhu Yingwen, Ju Jielei, Xu Yanwei
silver medal	Japan; Maki Mita, Tomoko Nagai, Norie Urabe, Sachiko Yamada
bronze medal	South Korea; Ryu Yoon-ji, Kim Hyun-joo, Shim Min-ji, Sun So-eun

The women's 4 × 100 metre freestyle relay swimming competition at the 2002 Asian Games in Busan was held on 3 October at the Sajik Swimming Pool.

== Schedule ==
All times are Korea Standard Time (UTC+09:00)

Date	Time	Event
Thursday, 3 October 2002	19:00	Final

== Records ==
Prior to this competition, the existing world, Asian and Games records were as follows.

World Record	Germany	3:36.00	Berlin, Germany	29 July 2002
Asian Record	China	3:37.91	Rome, Italy	7 September 1994
Games Record	China	3:45.51	Bangkok, Thailand	10 December 1998

== Results ==
Rank	Team	Time	Notes
1st place, gold medalist(s)	China (CHN)	3:40.95	GR
	Yang Yu	55.27	
	Zhu Yingwen	55.22	
	Ju Jielei	55.87	
	Xu Yanwei	54.59	
2nd place, silver medalist(s)	Japan (JPN)	3:44.59	
	Maki Mita	57.01	
	Tomoko Nagai	54.88	
	Norie Urabe	56.17	
	Sachiko Yamada	56.53	
3rd place, bronze medalist(s)	South Korea (KOR)	3:44.81	
	Ryu Yoon-ji	56.43	
	Kim Hyun-joo	55.54	
	Shim Min-ji	56.92	
	Sun So-eun	55.92	
4	Hong Kong (HKG)	3:55.15	
	Flora Kong	58.93	
	Tang Hing Ting	58.89	
	Jennifer Ng	58.91	
	Sherry Tsai	58.42	
5	Singapore (SIN)	3:56.70	
	Christel Bouvron	1:00.24	
	Nicolette Teo	59.27	
	Joscelin Yeo	56.89	
	Jacqueline Lim	1:00.30	
6	Thailand (THA)	4:00.57	
	Pilin Tachakittiranan	58.71	
	Piyaporn Tantiniti	59.66	
	Chorkaew Choompol	1:00.08	
	Chonlathorn Vorathamrong	1:02.12	
7	Pakistan (PAK)	4:40.84	
	Kiran Khan	1:09.84	
	Mahira Karim	1:10.60	
	Ayesha Tajwar	1:12.33	
	Sana Abdul Wahid	1:08.07	
