= Swimming at the 2002 Asian Games – Women's 100 metre freestyle =

Women's 100 metre freestyle at the 2002 Asian Games
- Venue: Sajik Swimming Pool
- Date: 2 October 2002
- Competitors: 21 from 14 nations

Medalists
| gold medal | Xu Yanwei | China |
| silver medal | Tomoko Nagai | Japan |
| silver medal | Yang Yu | China |

The women's 100 metre freestyle swimming competition at the 2002 Asian Games in Busan was held on 2 October 2002 at the Sajik Swimming Pool.

== Schedule ==
All times are Korea Standard Time (UTC+09:00)

| Date | Time | Event |
|---|---|---|
| Wednesday, 2 October 2002 | 10:00 | Heats |
| Wednesday, 2 October 2002 | 19:00 | Finals |

== Records ==
Prior to this competition, the existing world, Asian and Games records were as follows.

| World Record | Inge de Bruijn (NED) | 53.77 | Sydney, Australia | 20 September 2000 |
| Asian Record | Le Jingyi (CHN) | 54.01 | Rome, Italy | 5 September 1994 |
| Games Record | Shan Ying (CHN) | 54.40 | Hiroshima, Japan | 3 October 1994 |

== Results ==
Legend

- DNS — Did not start

=== Heats ===
| Rank | Heat | Athlete | Time | Notes |
|---|---|---|---|---|
| 1 | 3 | Xu Yanwei (CHN) | 55.71 | |
| 2 | 1 | Tomoko Nagai (JPN) | 55.99 | |
| 3 | 2 | Yang Yu (CHN) | 56.29 | |
| 4 | 1 | Sun So-eun (KOR) | 56.52 | |
| 5 | 2 | Ryu Yoon-ji (KOR) | 56.62 | |
| 6 | 3 | Norie Urabe (JPN) | 56.93 | |
| 7 | 2 | Moe Thu Aung (MYA) | 57.63 | |
| 8 | 3 | Shikha Tandon (IND) | 59.19 | |
| 9 | 2 | Jennifer Ng (HKG) | 59.67 | |
| 10 | 1 | Piyaporn Tantiniti (THA) | 59.75 | |
| 11 | 1 | Heidi Ong (PHI) | 1:00.01 | |
| 12 | 3 | Pang Shuk Mui (HKG) | 1:00.19 | |
| 13 | 3 | Lam Wai Man (MAC) | 1:00.82 | |
| 14 | 1 | Jacqueline Lim (SIN) | 1:01.35 | |
| 15 | 2 | Myagmarsürengiin Delgermaa (MGL) | 1:08.47 | |
| 16 | 1 | Kiran Khan (PAK) | 1:09.24 | |
| 17 | 3 | Sana Abdul Wahid (PAK) | 1:09.78 | |
| 18 | 2 | Aishath Azhoora Ahmed (MDV) | 1:14.40 | |
| 19 | 1 | Nayana Shakya (NEP) | 1:14.65 | |
| — | 3 | Joscelin Yeo (SIN) | DNS | |
| — | 2 | Reshma Millet (IND) | DNS | |

=== Finals ===
==== Final B ====
| Rank | Athlete | Time | Notes |
|---|---|---|---|
| 1 | Piyaporn Tantiniti (THA) | 59.70 | |
| 2 | Pang Shuk Mui (HKG) | 1:00.05 | |
| 3 | Jennifer Ng (HKG) | 1:00.13 | |
| 4 | Heidi Ong (PHI) | 1:00.25 | |
| 5 | Lam Wai Man (MAC) | 1:00.52 | |
| 6 | Kiran Khan (PAK) | 1:09.76 | |
| — | Jacqueline Lim (SIN) | DNS | |
| — | Myagmarsürengiin Delgermaa (MGL) | DNS | |

==== Final A ====
| Rank | Athlete | Time | Notes |
|---|---|---|---|
| 1st place, gold medalist(s) | Xu Yanwei (CHN) | 54.92 | |
| 2nd place, silver medalist(s) | Tomoko Nagai (JPN) | 55.51 | |
| 2nd place, silver medalist(s) | Yang Yu (CHN) | 55.51 | |
| 4 | Sun So-eun (KOR) | 56.21 | |
| 5 | Ryu Yoon-ji (KOR) | 56.30 | |
| 6 | Norie Urabe (JPN) | 57.00 | |
| 7 | Moe Thu Aung (MYA) | 58.01 | |
| 8 | Shikha Tandon (IND) | 58.49 | |
