= Aquatics at the 2005 SEA Games =

The aquatics events at the 2005 Southeast Asian Games included swimming, diving and water polo disciplines. All events were held in Trace College Aquatics Centre, Los Baños, Laguna, Philippines

== Swimming ==
The Swimming competition was held 29 November to 4 December, and featured 32 events.

=== Medal table ===
* Host nation (Philippines)

Rank	Nation	Gold	Silver	Bronze	Total
1	Singapore	13	9	11	33
2	Thailand	6	9	8	23
3	Philippines*	4	5	6	15
4	Indonesia	4	5	3	12
5	Malaysia	4	3	1	8
6	Vietnam	1	0	0	1
7	Myanmar	0	1	3	4
Totals (7 entries)		32	32	32	96

=== Medalists ===
Men

Event	Gold		Silver		Bronze	
50 m freestyle	Arwut Chinnapasaen; Thailand	22.98	Richard Sam Bera; Indonesia	23.36	Leslie Kwok; Singapore	23.58
100 m freestyle	Richard Sam Bera; Indonesia	51.94	Daniel Bego; Malaysia	52.35	Bryan Tay; Singapore	52.38
200 m freestyle	Daniel Bego; Malaysia	1:52.67	Miguel Molina; Philippines	1:52.83	Bryan Tay; Singapore	1:54.39
400 m freestyle	Lionel Lee; Singapore	4:00.51	Muhammad Akbar Nasution; Indonesia	4:00.57	Charnvudth Saengsri; Thailand	4:02.36
1500 m freestyle	Miguel Mendoza; Philippines	15:47.46	Charnvudth Saengsri; Thailand	15:55.42	Ryan Arabejo; Philippines	16:09.88
100 m backstroke	Alex Lim; Malaysia	56.97	Mark Chay; Singapore	58.49	Suriya Suksuphak; Thailand	58.76
200 m backstroke	Alex Lim; Malaysia	2:03.48	Gary Tan; Singapore	2:07.26	Marcus Cheah; Singapore	2:08.50
100 m breaststroke	Nguyễn Hữu Việt; Vietnam	1:03.80	Vorrawuti Aumpiwan; Thailand	1:04.01	Raphael Matthew Chua; Philippines	1:04.35
200 m breaststroke	Miguel Molina; Philippines	2:16.88	Vorrawuti Aumpiwan; Thailand	2:17.56	Herry Yudhianto; Indonesia	2:21.92
100 m butterfly	Daniel Bego; Malaysia	55.84	Donny Utomo; Indonesia	56.17	Alex Lim; Malaysia	56.26
200 m butterfly	Donny Utomo; Indonesia	2:02.44	James Walsh; Philippines	2:03.23	Gary Tan; Singapore	2:04.82
200 m individual medley	Miguel Molina; Philippines	2:03.80	Radomyos Matjiur; Thailand	2:07.12	Gary Tan; Singapore	2:08.01
400 m individual medley	Miguel Molina; Philippines	4:26.21	Muhammad Akbar Nasution; Indonesia	4:27.90	Lionel Lee; Singapore	4:32.58
4×100 m freestyle relay	Singapore; Mark Chay; Jeffrey Su; Gary Tan; Bryan Tay	3:27.56	Indonesia; Albert Sutanto; Felix Sutanto; Richard Sam Bera; Muhammad Akbar Nasution	3:29.46	Thailand; Radomyos Matjiur; Kunanon Kitipute; Keerati Oungsuthipornchai; Suriya Suksuphak	3:31.12
4×200 m freestyle relay	Singapore; Mark Chay; Marcus Cheah; Gary Tan; Bryan Tay	7:35.85	Thailand; Kunanon Kitipute; Thanaporn Panachart; Sakesan Sunsermsuk; Charnvudth Saengsri	7:42.22	Indonesia; Albert Sutanto; Felix Sutanto; Richard Sam Bera; Muhammad Akbar Nasution	7:43.56
4×100 m medley relay	Indonesia; Felix Sutanto; Albert Sutanto; Herry Yudhianto; Richard Sam Bera	3:51.51	Thailand; Suriya Suksuphak; Vorrawuti Aumpiwan; Peerapon Wiriyapragob; Keerati Oungsuthipornchai	3:52.16	Philippines; Evan Grabador; Raphael Matthew Chua; James Walsh; Miguel Molina	3:52.70

Women

Event	Gold		Silver		Bronze	
50 m freestyle	Joscelin Yeo; Singapore	26.13	Ho Shu Yong; Singapore	26.61	Moe Thu Aung; Myanmar	26.66
100 m freestyle	Joscelin Yeo; Singapore	56.41	Jiratida Phinyosophon; Thailand	57.74	Moe Thu Aung; Myanmar	58.05
200 m freestyle	Jiratida Phinyosophon; Thailand	2:04.38	Erica Totten; Philippines	2:04.76	Moe Thu Aung; Myanmar	2:05.43
400 m freestyle	Pilin Tachakittiranan; Thailand	4:23.19	Ong Ming Xiu; Malaysia	4:23.76	Quah Ting Wen; Singapore	4:24.73
800 m freestyle	Magdalena Sutanto; Indonesia	8:59.13	Quah Ting Wen; Singapore	9:02.20	Nimitta Thaveesupsoonthorn; Thailand	9:03.34
100 m backstroke	Tao Li; Singapore	1:03.83	Chui Lai Kwan; Malaysia	1:05.27	Chonlathorn Vorathamrong; Thailand	1:06.56
200 m backstroke	Tao Li; Singapore	2:17.55	Chonlathorn Vorathamrong; Thailand	2:18.66	Yuliana Malinda; Indonesia	2:23.17
100 m breaststroke	Joscelin Yeo; Singapore	1:11.74	Nicolette Teo; Singapore	1:11.80	Jaclyn Pangilinan; Philippines	1:12.73
200 m breaststroke	Nicolette Teo; Singapore	2:34.56	Jaclyn Pangilinan; Philippines	2:35.58	Jariyawadee Narongrit; Thailand	2:38.31
100 m butterfly	Joscelin Yeo; Singapore	59.91	Moe Thu Aung; Myanmar	1:00.87	Tao Li; Singapore	1:01.53
200 m butterfly	Tao Li; Singapore	2:14.11	Natnapa Prommuenwai; Thailand	2:17.29	Bernardette Lee; Singapore	2:18.81
200 m individual medley	Joscelin Yeo; Singapore	2:19.23	Nicolette Teo; Singapore	2:22.86	Nimitta Thaveesupsoonthorn; Thailand	2:24.38
400 m individual medley	Nimitta Thaveesupsoonthorn; Thailand	4:57.92	Bernardette Lee; Singapore	5:00.27	Quah Ting Wen; Singapore	5:01.57
4×100 m freestyle relay	Thailand; Natthanan Junkrajang; Piyaporn Tantiniti; Pannika Prachgosin; Jiratida Phinyosophon	3:52.70	Singapore; Ho Shu Yong; Joscelin Yeo; Ruth Ho; Lynette Ng	3:55.53	Philippines; Lizza Danila; Heidi Gem; Bianca Uy; Erica Totten	4:00.22
4×200 m freestyle relay	Thailand; Natthanan Junkrajang; Wenika Kaewchaiwong; Jiratida Phinyosophon; Pilin Tachakittiranan	8:24.38	Singapore; Ho Shu Yong; Mylene Ong; Quah Ting Wen; Joscelin Yeo	8:34.75	Philippines; Marichi Gandionco; Chrizel Lagunday; Nichole Santiago; Erica Totten	8:38.38
4×100 m medley relay	Singapore; Ho Shu Yong; Tao Li; Nicolette Teo; Joscelin Yeo	4:14.49	Philippines; Lizza Danila; Jaclyn Pangilinan; Erica Totten; Heidi Gem	4:20.34	Thailand; Jiratida Phinyosophon; Pannika Prachgosin; Piyaporn Tantiniti; Natthanan Junkrajang	4:21.39

== Diving ==
The diving events at the 2005 Southeast Asian Games took place in the Trace College Aquatic Centre in Los Baños, Laguna. It was held from November 27 to 30. Eight gold medals were contested in four disciplines.

=== Medal table ===
* Host nation (Philippines)

Rank	Nation	Gold	Silver	Bronze	Total
1	Malaysia	5	3	3	11
2	Philippines*	5	1	2	8
3	Thailand	0	3	4	7
4	Vietnam	0	2	0	2
5	Indonesia	0	1	1	2
Totals (5 entries)		10	10	10	30

=== Medalists ===
Men

Event	Gold		Silver		Bronze	
1 m springboard	Yeoh Ken Nee; Malaysia	387.99	Suchart Pichi; Thailand	362.25	Zardo Domenios; Philippines	340.17
3 m springboard	Yeoh Ken Nee; Malaysia	676.41	Suchart Pichi; Thailand	658.92	Zardo Domenios; Philippines	635.64
10 m platform	Bryan Nickson Lomas; Malaysia	580.20	Rexel Ryan Fabriga; Philippines	566.61	Sareerapat Pimsamsee; Thailand	585.87
Synchronized 3 m springboard	Philippines; Zardo Domenios; Niño Carog	299.40	Malaysia; Yeoh Ken Nee; Rossharisham Roslan	283.50	Thailand; Meerit Insawang; Suchart Pichi	276.73
Synchronized 10 m platform	Philippines; Kevin Kromwel Kong; Rexel Ryan Fabriga	300.78	Malaysia; Bryan Nickson Lomas; James Sandayud	299.94	Thailand; Sareerapat Pimsamsee; Suchart Pichi	272.70

Women

Event	Gold		Silver		Bronze	
1 m springboard	Sheila Mae Pérez; Philippines	267.66	Leong Mun Yee; Malaysia	266.34	Sari Ambarwati Suprihatin; Indonesia	229.74
3 m springboard	Sheila Mae Pérez; Philippines	514.23	Hoàng Thanh Trà; Vietnam	461.46	Leong Mun Yee; Malaysia	456.64
10 m platform	Leong Mun Yee; Malaysia	472.86	Shenny Ratna Amelia; Indonesia	466.89	Cheong Jun Hoong; Malaysia	440.43
Synchronized 3 m springboard	Philippines; Sheila Mae Pérez; Ceseil Domenios	260.16	Thailand; Sukrutai Tommaoros; Supapan Prasertkwan	239.40	Malaysia; Cheong Jun Hoong; Leong Mun Yee	238.11
Synchronized 10 m platform	Malaysia; Leong Mun Yee; Cheong Jun Hoong	258.99	Vietnam; Hoàng Thanh Trà; Nguyễn Hoài Anh	223.68	Thailand; Sukrutai Tommaoros; Neeranuch Chantrakulcholt	214.20

== Water polo ==
The Water polo events were held from 21 November to 26 November 2005 at the Trace College, Los Baños, Laguna. Six teams were in competition in a round-robin format, with defending champion Singapore looking towards retaining its crown won 20 times consecutively since 1965. The team's win over Thailand on the fourth day of the tournament effectively meant it has worn the gold medal regardless of the score in its final match against Vietnam. The Philippines team managed to take the silver medal, equaling its best showing in the 1993 Southeast Asian Games.

=== Medalists ===
Event	Gold	Silver	Bronze
Men	Singapore; David Wee; Ho Khai Weng; Kenneth Wee; Lee Kok Wang Alvin; Lee Sai Meng; Luo Nan; Mallal Garret Charles; Ng Eu Liem Marcus; Ng Ker Wei; Ronald Lam; Tan Chin Tiong; Tan Wei Keong Terence; Yip Ren Kai	Philippines; Alan Cesar Payawal; Sherwin Dela Paz; Michael Jorolan; Ricardo Dilap Dilap; Norton Alamara; Almax Laurel; Frazier Alamara; Teodoro Roy Cañete; Ali Alamara; Dale Evangelista; Danny Dela Torre; Monsuito Pelenio; Tani Gomez	Malaysia; Loo Jih Sheng; Albert Yeap Jin Teik; Danny Ng Chin Han; Teo Peng Jiew; Wong Khar Munn; Wong Khar Leon; Jimmy Shim Wai Chong; Lim How Jit; Kee Zhen Hao; Madhusudhan Varavindhakshan; Abdul Hafiz Salleh; Lai Cheng Loke; Kee Dow Liang

=== Round-robin ===
Standings

Team	Pld	W	D	L	GF	GA	Pts
1. Singapore	5	5	0	0	71	23	10
2. Philippines	5	4	0	1	52	24	8
3. Malaysia	5	2	0	3	24	46	4
4. Indonesia	5	1	1	3	40	53	3
5. Thailand	5	1	1	3	21	39	3
6. Vietnam	5	1	0	4	32	55	2

Results

21 November 2005
Philippines	15 – 10	Indonesia
Thailand	7 – 5	Vietnam
Singapore	21 – 3	Malaysia
22 November 2005
Indonesia	12 – 13	Vietnam
Malaysia	7 – 4	Thailand
Philippines	6 – 7	Singapore
23 November 2005
Vietnam	7 – 8	Malaysia
Singapore	16 – 7	Indonesia
Thailand	2 – 10	Philippines
24 November 2005
Indonesia	6 – 4	Malaysia
Philippines	13 – 3	Vietnam
Singapore	12 – 3	Thailand
25 November 2005
Thailand	5 – 5	Indonesia
Vietnam	4 – 15	Singapore
Philippines	8 – 2	Malaysia

== Games Records ==
- Men's 50 m Freestyle: Thailand's Arwut Chinnapasaen, 22.98

(previous record of 23.03 was set in ? by Richard Sambera)

- Men's 4x200 m Freestyle Relay: Singapore's Chay Jung Jun Mark, Cheah Mingzhe Marcus, Tan Lee Yu Gary, Tay Zhi Rong Bryan, 7:35.85

(previous record of 7:38:82 was set in 2001 by Singapore's relay team)

- Women's 50 m Freestyle: Singapore's Joscelin Yeo, 26.13

(previous record of 26.23 was set in ? by ?)

- Women's 100 m Backstroke: Singapore's Tao Li, 1:03.83

(previous record of ? was set in ? by ?)

- Women's 100 m Butterfly: Singapore's Joscelin Yeo, 59.91

(previous record of 1:00.44 was set in 1999 by Joscelin Yeo)

- Women's 200 m Butterfly: Singapore's Tao Li, 2:14.11

(previous record of ? was set in 1999 by Joscelin Yeo)

- Women's 4x100 m Medley Relay: Singapore's Ho Shu Yong, Tao Li, Nicolette Teo, Joscelin Yeo, 4:14.49

(previous record of 4:19.23 was set in 1997 by Indonesia's relay team)

Preceded by 2003	Aquatics at the Southeast Asian Games	Succeeded by 2007
