= Swimming at the 2002 Asian Games – Women's 4 × 100 metre medley relay =

Women's 4 × 100 metre medley relay at the 2002 Asian Games
- Venue: Sajik Swimming Pool
- Date: 5 October 2002
- Competitors: 28 from 7 nations

Medalists
gold medal	China; Zhan Shu, Luo Xuejuan, Zhou Yafei, Xu Yanwei
silver medal	Japan; Noriko Inada, Fumiko Kawanabe, Yuko Nakanishi, Tomoko Nagai
bronze medal	South Korea; Shim Min-ji, Ku Hyo-jin, Park Kyung-hwa, Sun So-eun

The women's 4 × 100 metre medley relay swimming competition at the 2002 Asian Games in Busan was held on 5 October at the Sajik Swimming Pool.

== Schedule ==
All times are Korea Standard Time (UTC+09:00)

Date	Time	Event
Saturday, 5 October 2002	19:00	Final

== Records ==
Prior to this competition, the existing world, Asian and Games records were as follows.

World Record	United States	3:58.30	Sydney, Australia	23 September 2000
Asian Record	China	4:01.67	Rome, Italy	10 September 1994
Games Record	Japan	4:06.70	Bangkok, Thailand	11 December 1998

== Results ==
Rank	Team	Time	Notes
1st place, gold medalist(s)	China (CHN)	4:00.21	AR
	Zhan Shu	1:01.67	
	Luo Xuejuan	1:06.14	
	Zhou Yafei	58.20	
	Xu Yanwei	54.20	
2nd place, silver medalist(s)	Japan (JPN)	4:05.75	
	Noriko Inada	1:01.55	
	Fumiko Kawanabe	1:09.61	
	Yuko Nakanishi	59.76	
	Tomoko Nagai	54.83	
3rd place, bronze medalist(s)	South Korea (KOR)	4:13.41	
	Shim Min-ji	1:02.82	
	Ku Hyo-jin	1:11.41	
	Park Kyung-hwa	1:03.52	
	Sun So-eun	55.66	
4	Hong Kong (HKG)	4:18.88	
	Sherry Tsai	1:03.56	
	Liu Ka Lei	1:13.14	
	Flora Kong	1:02.98	
	Tang Hing Ting	59.20	
5	Thailand (THA)	4:24.13	
	Chonlathorn Vorathamrong	1:05.35	
	Jariyawadee Narongrit	1:15.74	
	Pilin Tachakittiranan	1:03.41	
	Chorkaew Choompol	59.63	
6	Philippines (PHI)	4:25.12	
	Lizza Danila	1:06.12	
	Jenny Guerrero	1:14.10	
	Lucia Dacanay	1:04.99	
	Heidi Ong	59.91	
7	Pakistan (PAK)	5:12.29	
	Kiran Khan	1:18.93	
	Mehrunnisa Khan	1:27.67	
	Sana Abdul Wahid	1:14.72	
	Ayesha Tajwar	1:10.97	
