= Ku Hyo-jin =

South Korean swimmer (born 1985)

Personal information
- Full name: Ku Hyo-jin
- National team: South Korea
- Born: 19 June 1985 (age 41) Seoul, South Korea
- Height: 1.58 m (5 ft 2 in)
- Weight: 53 kg (117 lb)

Korean name
- Hangul: 구효진
- RR: Gu Hyojin
- MR: Ku Hyojin

Sport
- Sport: Swimming
- Strokes: Breaststroke
Medal record
Women's swimming
Representing South Korea
Asian Games
Bronze medal – third place	2002 Busan	4×100 m medley

Ku Hyo-jin (Korean: 구효진; born June 19, 1985) is a South Korean former swimmer, who specialized in breaststroke events. She represented South Korea, as a 15-year-old, at the 2000 Summer Olympics, and later helped her squad capture the bronze medal for the host nation at the 2002 Asian Games.

Ku competed only in two swimming events at the 2000 Summer Olympics in Sydney. She achieved a FINA B-cut of 2:31.76 from the Dong-A Swimming Tournament in Ulsan. In the 200 m breaststroke, Ku failed to advance to the top 8 final, as she finished her semifinal run with an eleventh-place time in 2:28.50. Earlier in the prelims, she made a surprise packet with a new South Korean record of 2:28.21 from an outside lane in heat four to pick up a similar seed for the top 16 field. Ku also teamed up with Shim Min-ji, Chang Hee-jin, and Lee Bo-eun in the 4×100 m medley relay. Swimming the breaststroke leg in heat two, Ku recorded a split of 1:10.89, but the South Koreans rounded out a six-team field to last place and seventeenth overall in a final time of 4:16.93.

When her nation hosted the 2002 Asian Games in Busan, Ku gave the South Korean home crowd a further reason to celebrate, as she shared bronze medals with Shim Min-ji and newcomers Park Kyung-hwa and Sun So-eun in the 4×100 m medley relay (4:13.41). She also attempted for her first career medal in the 100 m breaststroke, but finished off the podium by exactly a single second with a fifth-place time of 1:11.11.
