= Swimming at the 2002 Asian Games – Women's 50 metre freestyle =

Women's 50 metre freestyle at the 2002 Asian Games
- Venue: Sajik Swimming Pool
- Date: 4 October 2002
- Competitors: 19 from 14 nations

Medalists
gold medal	Xu Yanwei	China
silver medal	Sun So-eun	South Korea
bronze medal	Zhou Xiaowei	China

The women's 50 metre freestyle swimming competition at the 2002 Asian Games in Busan was held on 4 October at the Sajik Swimming Pool.

== Schedule ==
All times are Korea Standard Time (UTC+09:00)

Date	Time	Event
Friday, 4 October 2002	10:00	Heats
Friday, 4 October 2002	19:00	Final

== Records ==
Prior to this competition, the existing world, Asian and Games records were as follows.

World Record	Inge de Bruijn (NED)	24.13	Sydney, Australia	22 September 2000
Asian Record	Le Jingyi (CHN)	24.51	Rome, Italy	11 September 1994
Games Record	Le Jingyi (CHN)	25.26	Hiroshima, Japan	8 October 1994

== Results ==
=== Heats ===
Rank	Heat	Athlete	Time	Notes
1	3	Xu Yanwei (CHN)	25.46	
2	2	Sun So-eun (KOR)	25.78	
3	2	Zhou Xiaowei (CHN)	25.81	
4	1	Tomoko Nagai (JPN)	26.06	
5	3	Ryu Yoon-ji (KOR)	26.32	
6	3	Norie Urabe (JPN)	26.50	
7	1	Moe Thu Aung (MYA)	27.01	
8	1	Tang Hing Ting (HKG)	27.12	
9	1	Shikha Tandon (IND)	27.23	
10	3	Pang Shuk Mui (HKG)	27.25	
11	2	Jacqueline Lim (SIN)	27.31	
12	2	Piyaporn Tantiniti (THA)	27.35	
13	2	Heidi Ong (PHI)	27.78	
14	3	Lam Wai Man (MAC)	27.84	
15	3	Sana Abdul Wahid (PAK)	30.92	
16	1	Myagmarsürengiin Delgermaa (MGL)	31.17	
17	1	Kiran Khan (PAK)	31.19	
18	2	Aishath Azhoora Ahmed (MDV)	31.89	
19	3	Nayana Shakya (NEP)	33.19	

=== Final ===
Rank	Athlete	Time	Notes
1st place, gold medalist(s)	Xu Yanwei (CHN)	25.42	
2nd place, silver medalist(s)	Sun So-eun (KOR)	25.63	
3rd place, bronze medalist(s)	Zhou Xiaowei (CHN)	25.76	
4	Tomoko Nagai (JPN)	25.91	
5	Ryu Yoon-ji (KOR)	26.21	
6	Norie Urabe (JPN)	26.60	
7	Moe Thu Aung (MYA)	26.72	
8	Tang Hing Ting (HKG)	27.06	
