= Aquatics at the 2007 SEA Games =

Southeast Asian Games in Thailand

The aquatics events at the 2007 SEA Games included swimming, diving and water polo. The events were held at the Aquatic Center, His Majesty the King's 80th Birthday Anniversary Stadium, Nakhon Ratchasima, Thailand.

== Swimming ==
The Swimming competition was held from 7 to 11 December and featured 32 events.

=== Participating nations ===
9 countries competed (team size is number behind country):

- Cambodia (4)
- Indonesia (22)
- Laos (10)
- Malaysia (23)
- Myanmar (5)
- Philippines (14)
- Singapore (22)
- Thailand (12)
- Vietnam (6)

Note: There was no participation from Brunei Darussalam and Timor Leste.

=== Medal tally ===
* Host nation (Thailand)

Rank	Nation	Gold	Silver	Bronze	Total
1	Singapore (SIN)	11	9	6	26
2	Philippines (PHI)	8	3	7	18
3	Malaysia (MAS)	7	8	8	23
4	Thailand (THA)*	5	7	8	20
5	Vietnam (VIE)	1	0	1	2
6	Indonesia (INA)	0	5	2	7
Totals (6 entries)		32	32	32	96

=== Medalists ===
==== Men ====
Event	Gold		Silver		Bronze	
50 m freestyle	Daniel Coakley; Philippines	22.80	Arwut Chinnapasaen; Thailand	23.24	Russell Ong; Singapore	23.51
100 m freestyle	Bryan Tay Zhi Rong; Singapore	51.23	Daniel Bego; Malaysia	51.53	Kendrick Uy; Philippines	52.16
200 m freestyle	Daniel Bego; Malaysia	1:52.32	Bryan Tay Zhi Rong; Singapore	1:52.98	Miguel Molina; Philippines	1:53.59
400 m freestyle	Tharnawat Thanakornworakiart; Thailand	3:59.08	Marcus Cheah Ming Zhe; Singapore	3:59.61	Ryan Arabejo; Philippines	3:59.81
1500 m freestyle	Ryan Arabejo; Philippines	15:53.16	Tharnawat Thanakornworakiart; Thailand	15:58.92	Marcus Cheah Ming Zhe; Singapore	16:07.99
100 m backstroke	Zach Ong; Singapore	59.46	Glenn Victor Sutanto; Indonesia	59.56	Đỗ Huy Long; Vietnam	59.60
200 m backstroke	Ryan Arabejo; Philippines	2:05.82	Zach Ong; Singapore	2:08.17	Marcus Cheah Ming Zhe; Singapore	2:09.32
100 m breaststroke	Nguyen Huu Viet; Vietnam	1:03.73	Worawut Ampaiwan; Thailand	1:03.95	Radomyos Matjiur; Thailand	1:04.66
200 m breaststroke	Miguel Molina; Philippines	2:18.11	Billy Arfianto; Indonesia	2:20.87	Worawut Ampaiwan; Thailand	2:21.32
100 m butterfly	Daniel Bego; Malaysia	54.33	James Walsh; Philippines	55.47	Andy Wibowo; Indonesia	55.59
200 m butterfly	James Walsh; Philippines	2:00.45	Donny Utomo; Indonesia	2:00.81	Daniel Bego; Malaysia	2:03.97
200 m individual medley	Miguel Molina; Philippines	2:05.50	Radomyos Matjiur; Thailand	2:09.12	Muhammad Akbar Nasution; Indonesia	2:09.25
400 m individual medley	Miguel Molina; Philippines	4:28.85	Muhammad Akbar Nasution; Indonesia	4:28.91	Lim Zhi Cong; Singapore	4:40.42
4 × 100 m freestyle relay	Singapore (SIN); Russell Ong; Jeffrey Shu Shi Rong; Nicholas Tan Xue Wei; Bryan Tay Zhi Rong	3:26.70	Philippines (PHI); Daniel Coakley; James Walsh; Kendrick Uy; Miguel Molina	3:27.70	Thailand (THA); Kunanon Kittipute; Radomyos Matjiur; Thanyanant Phadungkiatwatana; Suriya Suksuphak	3:32.59
4 × 200 m freestyle relay	Singapore (SIN); Marcus Cheah Ming Zhe; Joshua Lim Wen Hao; Bryan Tay Zhi Rong; Thum Bing Ming	7:38.62	Thailand (THA); Kunanon Kittipute; Radomyos Matjiur; Thanyanant Phadungkiatwatana; Tharnawat Thanakornworakiart	7:43.26	Malaysia (MAS); Eric Chang; Daniel Bego; Kevin Lim; Kevin Yeap Soon Choy	7:43.28
4 × 100 m medley relay	Philippines (PHI); Daniel Coakley; James Walsh; Miguel Molina; Ryan Arabejo	3:49.28	Indonesia (INA); Andy Wibowo; Glenn Victor Sutanto; Herry Yudhianto; Richard Sam Bera	3:51.72	Singapore (SIN); Zach Ong; Jeffrey Shu Shi Rong; Leonard Tan Jin; Bryan Tay Zhi Rong	3:52.14

==== Women ====
Event	Gold		Silver		Bronze	
50 m freestyle	Chui Lai Kwan; Malaysia	26.63	Leung Chii Lin; Malaysia	26.79	Natnapa Prommuenwai; Thailand	26.80
100 m freestyle	Natthanan Junkrajang; Thailand	57.55	Quah Ting Wen; Singapore	58.14	Jiratida Phinyosophon; Thailand	58.45
200 m freestyle	Natthanan Junkrajang; Thailand	2:03.00	Quah Ting Wen; Singapore	2:03.55	Erica Totten; Philippines	2:05.75
400 m freestyle	Khoo Cai Lin; Malaysia	4:18.20	Natthanan Junkrajang; Thailand	4:20.01	Rutai Santadvatana; Thailand	4:22.55
800 m freestyle	Khoo Cai Lin; Malaysia	8:47.80	Lynette Lim Shu-En; Singapore	8:56.19	Lew Yih Wey; Malaysia	9:00.43
100 m backstroke	Tao Li; Singapore	1:04.05	Shana Lim Jia Yi; Singapore	1:04.74	Chai Sook Fun; Malaysia	1:06.03
200 m backstroke	Lew Yih Wey; Malaysia	2:17.39	Nimitta Thaveesupsoonthorn; Thailand	2:20.84	Shana Lim Jia Yi; Singapore	2:21.43
100 m breaststroke	Nicolette Teo Wei-min; Singapore	1:10.15	Siow Yi Ting; Malaysia	1:12.65	Jaclyn Pangilinan; Philippines	1:13.57
200 m breaststroke	Nicolette Teo Wei-min; Singapore	2:31.96	Siow Yi Ting; Malaysia	2:32.55	Jaclyn Pangilinan; Philippines	2:39.16
100 m butterfly	Tao Li; Singapore	1:00.33	Louisa Los Santos; Malaysia	1:02.08	Marellyn Liew; Malaysia	1:02.25
200 m butterfly	Tao Li; Singapore	2:15.63	Erica Totten; Philippines	2:16.79	Hii Siew Siew; Malaysia	2:20.71
200 m individual medley	Siow Yi Ting; Malaysia	2:18.52	Tao Li; Singapore	2:20.80	Nimitta Thaveesupsoonthorn; Thailand	2:21.22
400 m individual medley	Quah Ting Wen; Singapore	4:53.90	Siow Yi Ting; Malaysia	4:54.11	Lew Yih Wey; Malaysia	4:55.86
4 × 100 m freestyle relay	Thailand (THA); Natthanan Junkrajang; Pannika Prachgosin; Jiratida Yosophon; Pilin Tachakittiranan	3:51.86	Malaysia (MAS); Heidi Gan; Khoo Cai Lin; Leung Chii Lin; Siow Yi Ting	3:54.91	Philippines (PHI); Erica Totten; Maria Georgina Gandionco; Jaclyn Pangilinan; Nicole Santiago	4:01.72
4 × 200 m freestyle relay	Thailand (THA); Natthanan Junkrajang; Jiratida Yosophon; Rutai Vatana; Pilin Tachakittiranan	8:20.77	Singapore (SIN); Lynette Lim Shu-En; Amanda Lim Xiang Qi; Quah Ting Wen; Mylene Ong Chui Bin	8:26.23	Malaysia (MAS); Heidi Gan; Khoo Cai Lin; Lew Yih Wey; Ong Ming Xiu	8:27.13
4 × 100 m medley relay	Singapore (SIN); Shana Lim Jia Yi; Nicolette Teo Wei-min; Tao Li; Quah Ting Wen	4:13.18	Malaysia (MAS); Chai Sook Fun; Leung Chii Lin; Louisa Los Santos; Siow Yi Ting	4:19.33	Thailand (THA); Wenika Kaewchaiwong; Natthanan Junkrajang; Natnapa Prommuenwai; Phantira Saraikarn	4:25.00

== Diving ==
The diving events at the 2007 Southeast Asian Games took place at the His Majesty The King's 80th Anniv. Swimming Pool. It was held from 12 December to 15 December 2007. Ten gold medals were contested.

=== Participating nations ===
- Indonesia (7)
- Malaysia (8)
- Myanmar (8)
- Philippines (7)
- Thailand (6)
- Vietnam (5)

There was no participation from Brunei, Cambodia, Laos, Singapore, and Timor Leste.

=== Medal tally ===
* Host nation (Thailand)

Rank	Nation	Gold	Silver	Bronze	Total
1	Malaysia	7	3	3	13
2	Philippines	2	4	1	7
3	Indonesia	1	1	3	5
4	Vietnam	0	2	2	4
5	Thailand*	0	0	1	1
Totals (5 entries)		10	10	10	30

=== Medalists ===
==== Men ====
Event	Gold		Silver		Bronze	
1 m springboard	Yeoh Ken Nee; Malaysia	416.05	Zardo Domenios; Philippines	380.85	Rossharisham Roslan; Malaysia	361.50
3 m springboard	Yeoh Ken Nee; Malaysia	444.05	Rossharisham Roslan; Malaysia	435.65	Zardo Domenios; Philippines	407.40
10 m platform	Bryan Nickson Lomas; Malaysia	429.70	Rexel Ryan Fabriga; Philippines	419.90	Mohamed Nasrullah; Indonesia	401.10
Synchronized 3 m springboard	Malaysia; Yeoh Ken Nee; Rossharisham Roslan	416.76	Philippines; Zardo Domenios; Niño Carog	366.42	Vietnam; Vũ Anh Duy; Nguyễn Minh Sang	324.93
Synchronized 10 m platform	Philippines; Rexel Ryan Fabriga; Jaime Asok	376.72	Vietnam; Vũ Anh Duy; Nguyễn Minh Sang	365.04	Indonesia; Mohamed Nasrullah; Husaini Noor	357.96

==== Women ====
Event	Gold		Silver		Bronze	
1 m springboard	Leong Mun Yee; Malaysia	278.30	Sheila Mae Pérez; Philippines	265.80	Elizabeth Jimie; Malaysia	263.10
3 m springboard	Sheila Mae Pérez; Philippines	316.60	Leong Mun Yee; Malaysia	306.90	Hoàng Thanh Trà; Vietnam	300.80
10 m platform	Shenny Ratna Amelia; Indonesia	345.30	Pandelela Rinong; Malaysia	308.85	Cheong Jun Hoong; Malaysia	300.25
Synchronized 3 m springboard	Malaysia; Elizabeth Jimie; Leong Mun Yee	281.28	Vietnam; Hoàng Thanh Trà; Nguyễn Hoài Anh	260.31	Indonesia; Nani Suryani Wulansari; Eka Purnama Indah	256.02
Synchronized 10 m platform	Malaysia; Pandelela Rinong; Cheong Jun Hoong	293.79	Indonesia; Shenny Ratna Amelia; Herlyani Sukmahati	270.12	Thailand; Sukrutai Tommaoros; Dangjai Putsadee	208.17

== Water polo ==
The Water polo events was held from 7 December to 11 December 2007. Six teams were in competition in a round-robin format, with defending champion Singapore retaining its title which it has won 22 times consecutively since 1965, inclusive of the current games.

=== Participating nations ===
- Indonesia (13)
- Malaysia (14)
- Philippines (13)
- Singapore (13)
- Thailand (13)
- Vietnam (13)

There was no participation from Brunei Darussalam, Cambodia, Laos, Myanmar and Timor Leste.

=== Medal tally ===
* Host nation

Rank	Nation	Gold	Silver	Bronze	Total
1	Singapore	1	0	0	1
2	Philippines	0	1	0	1
3	Indonesia	0	0	1	1
Totals (3 entries)		1	1	1	3

=== Medalists ===
Event	Gold	Silver	Bronze
Men's competition	Singapore (SIN); Alvin Lee Kok Wang; Alvin Poh Hock Yen; Eugene Ng Wai Chin; Eugene Teo Zhenwei; Kelvin Ong Wei Sheng; Kenneth Wee; Lin Di Yan; Lin Di Yang; Luo Nan; Nigel Tay Sin Chao; Paul Louis Tan Jwee Ann; Terence Tan Wei Keong; Yip Renkai	Philippines (PHI); Allan Payawal; Almax Laurel; Dale Evangelista; Danny de la Torre; Ernesto Pabalan; Frazier Alamara; Johnny Uba; Michael Jorolan; Monsuito Pelenio; Norton Alamara; Sherwin de la Paz; Tani Gomez; Teodoro Cañete	Indonesia (INA); Andreas Rully Inkiriwang; Dwinanto Ribowo; Hendra Jaya Putra Toufik; Hendrik Sugianto; Henry Marciano Raditya; Heryansyah Saragih; Indrawan Ginting; Indri; Kemas Achmad Mahyuddin; Maulana Bayu Herfianto; Rezza Auditya Putra; Soedorman Prajogo; Soesanto Prajogo

=== Round-robin ===
Standings

Team	Pld	W	D	L	GF	GA	GD	Pts
1. Singapore	5	5	0	0	70	24	46	10
2. Philippines	5	3	1	1	61	37	24	7
3. Indonesia	5	3	0	2	57	57	0	6
4. Thailand	5	2	1	2	43	47	-4	5
5. Vietnam	5	1	0	4	39	67	-28	2
6. Malaysia	5	0	0	5	29	67	-38	0

Results

7 December 2007
Malaysia	6 – 15 (1–5,2–3,3–4,0–3)	Philippines
Indonesia	19 – 11 (6–1,3–4,3–2,7–4)	Vietnam
Thailand	5 – 15 (1–3,2–4,2–4,0–4)	Singapore
8 December 2007
Philippines	3 – 7 (1–2,0–1,0–2,2–2)	Singapore
Malaysia	7 – 15 (0–0,2–5,4–3,1–7)	Indonesia
Vietnam	7 – 9 (1–2,2–2,3–3,1–2)	Thailand
9 December 2007
Singapore	20 – 7 (3–2,6–1,6–2,5–2)	Vietnam
Indonesia	9 – 20 (1–6,1–6,4–3,3–5)	Philippines
Thailand	13 – 7 (5–4,3–0,2–3,3–0)	Malaysia
10 December 2007
Philippines	13 – 5 (2–3,2–1,2–1,7–0)	Vietnam
Malaysia	3 – 15 (2–3,0–3,1–6,–3)	Singapore
Indonesia	8 – 6 (4–1,1–0,2–2,1–3)	Thailand
11 December 2007
Indonesia	6 – 13 (1–2,1–2,1–3,3–6)	Singapore
Malaysia	6 – 9 (2–2,0–1,2–4,2–2)	Vietnam
Thailand	10 – 10 (1–3,3–3,5–2,1–2)	Philippines

== See also ==
- List of SEA Games records in swimming

Preceded by 2005	Aquatics at the SEA Games; 2007 SEA Games	Succeeded by 2009
