= Lew Yih Wey =

Malaysian swimmer

Personal information
- Full name: Lew Yih Wey
- National team: Malaysia
- Born: 27 June 1991 (age 35) Port Dickson, Negeri Sembilan, Malaysia
- Height: 1.56 m (5 ft 1 in)
- Weight: 50 kg (110 lb)

Sport
- Sport: Swimming
- Strokes: Freestyle, backstroke, medley
- Club: Kelab Paroi Negeri Sembilan
Medal record
Women's swimming
Representing Malaysia
Southeast Asian Games
Gold medal – first place	2007 Korat	200 m backstroke
Bronze medal – third place	2007 Korat	800 m freestyle
Bronze medal – third place	2007 Korat	400 m medley
Bronze medal – third place	2007 Korat	4×200 m freestyle

Lew Yih Wey (born 27 June 1991) is a Malaysian swimmer, who specialised in long-distance freestyle, backstroke, and individual medley events. She represented her nation Malaysia at the 2008 Summer Olympics, and has won a career total of four medals (one gold and three bronze) in a major international competition, spanning the 2007 Southeast Asian Games in Bangkok, Thailand.

Lew competed for the Malaysian swimming team in the women's 400 m individual medley at the 2008 Summer Olympics in Beijing. Three months before the Games, she produced a record-breaking effort and cleared a FINA B-cut of 4:50.52 to earn her Olympic debut at the Malaysian Open Championships in Bukit Jalil. Her winning time from the meet also erased the national mark of 4:51.01, set by Siow Yi Ting at the 2003 Southeast Asian Games in Hanoi, Vietnam. Swimming as the fastest entrant in heat one, Lew attempted to chase Singapore's Quah Ting Wen and 2004 Olympic finalist Nam Yoo-sun of South Korea at the final turn of the race, but could not catch them near the wall to finish only with a third-place time and thirty-fourth overall in 4:55.83, just more than five seconds outside her national record.
