= Swimming at the 2002 Asian Games – Women's 100 metre backstroke =

Women's 100 metre backstroke at the 2002 Asian Games
- Venue: Sajik Swimming Pool
- Date: 2 October 2002
- Competitors: 14 from 9 nations

Medalists
gold medal	Zhan Shu	China
silver medal	Noriko Inada	Japan
bronze medal	Aya Terakawa	Japan

The women's 100 metre backstroke swimming competition at the 2002 Asian Games in Busan was held on 2 October at the Sajik Swimming Pool.

== Schedule ==
All times are Korea Standard Time (UTC+09:00)

Date	Time	Event
Wednesday, 2 October 2002	10:00	Heats
Wednesday, 2 October 2002	19:00	Final

== Records ==
Prior to this competition, the existing world, Asian and Games records were as follows.

World Record	Natalie Coughlin (USA)	59.58	Fort Lauderdale, United States	13 August 2002
Asian Record	He Cihong (CHN)	1:00.16	Rome, Italy	10 September 1994
Games Record	He Cihong (CHN)	1:00.71	Hiroshima, Japan	5 October 1994

== Results ==
Legend

- DNS — Did not start

=== Heats ===
Rank	Heat	Athlete	Time	Notes
1	1	Noriko Inada (JPN)	1:02.01	
2	2	Shim Min-ji (KOR)	1:03.00	
3	2	Aya Terakawa (JPN)	1:03.05	
3	2	Zhan Shu (CHN)	1:03.05	
5	1	Chen Xiujun (CHN)	1:03.25	
6	2	Sherry Tsai (HKG)	1:03.76	
7	1	Bang Eun-ji (KOR)	1:04.69	
8	1	Chonlathorn Vorathamrong (THA)	1:05.42	
9	2	Lizza Danila (PHI)	1:06.44	
10	1	Lucia Dacanay (PHI)	1:08.47	
11	1	Andrea Chum (MAC)	1:15.49	
12	2	Kiran Khan (PAK)	1:18.70	
13	1	Ayesha Tajwar (PAK)	1:30.03	
—	2	Jacqueline Lim (SIN)	DNS	

=== Final ===
Rank	Athlete	Time	Notes
1st place, gold medalist(s)	Zhan Shu (CHN)	1:01.82	
2nd place, silver medalist(s)	Noriko Inada (JPN)	1:02.16	
3rd place, bronze medalist(s)	Aya Terakawa (JPN)	1:02.35	
4	Shim Min-ji (KOR)	1:02.83	
5	Chen Xiujun (CHN)	1:02.90	
6	Sherry Tsai (HKG)	1:03.96	
7	Chonlathorn Vorathamrong (THA)	1:04.74	
8	Bang Eun-ji (KOR)	1:04.84	
