= Swimming at the 2002 Asian Games – Women's 200 metre backstroke =

Women's 200 metre backstroke at the 2002 Asian Games
- Venue: Sajik Swimming Pool
- Date: 4 October 2002
- Competitors: 10 from 7 nations

Medalists
gold medal	Reiko Nakamura	Japan
silver medal	Aya Terakawa	Japan
bronze medal	Zhan Shu	China

The women's 200 metre backstroke swimming competition at the 2002 Asian Games in Busan was held on 4 October at the Sajik Swimming Pool.

== Schedule ==
All times are Korea Standard Time (UTC+09:00)

Date	Time	Event
Friday, 4 October 2002	10:00	Heats
Friday, 4 October 2002	19:00	Final

== Records ==
Prior to this competition, the existing world, Asian and Games records were as follows.

World Record	Krisztina Egerszegi (HUN)	2:06.62	Athens, Greece	25 August 1991
Asian Record	He Cihong (CHN)	2:07.40	Rome, Italy	11 September 1994
Games Record	He Cihong (CHN)	2:09.46	Hiroshima, Japan	8 October 1994

== Results ==
=== Heats ===
Rank	Heat	Athlete	Time	Notes
1	1	Reiko Nakamura (JPN)	2:13.03	
2	2	Chen Xiujun (CHN)	2:18.81	
3	2	Bang Eun-ji (KOR)	2:19.26	
4	2	Zhan Shu (CHN)	2:19.30	
5	1	Aya Terakawa (JPN)	2:19.61	
6	1	Chonlathorn Vorathamrong (THA)	2:20.50	
7	1	Lizza Danila (PHI)	2:20.70	
8	2	Sherry Tsai (HKG)	2:21.76	
9	2	Sia Wai Yen (MAS)	2:25.61	
10	1	Lucia Dacanay (PHI)	2:26.66	

=== Final ===
Rank	Athlete	Time	Notes
1st place, gold medalist(s)	Reiko Nakamura (JPN)	2:11.44	
2nd place, silver medalist(s)	Aya Terakawa (JPN)	2:12.38	
3rd place, bronze medalist(s)	Zhan Shu (CHN)	2:13.25	
4	Chen Xiujun (CHN)	2:13.57	
5	Bang Eun-ji (KOR)	2:17.96	
6	Sherry Tsai (HKG)	2:18.60	
7	Chonlathorn Vorathamrong (THA)	2:19.15	
8	Lizza Danila (PHI)	2:22.19	
