= Diving at the 2013 SEA Games – Women's synchronized 10 metre platform =

The women's synchronized 10 metre platform diving competition at the 2013 SEA Games took place in Naypyidaw, Myanmar on 21 December at the Wunna Theikdi Aquatics Centre.

== Schedule ==
All times are Myanmar Standard Time (UTC+06:30)

| Date | Time | Event |
|---|---|---|
| Saturday, 21 December 2013 | 17:00 | Final |

== Results ==
Legend

- DNF — Did not finish
- DNS — Did not start

| Rank | Athlete | Dives | | | | | Total |
| Rank | Athlete | 1 | 2 | 3 | 4 | 5 | Total |
|---|---|---|---|---|---|---|---|
| 1st place, gold medalist(s) | Malaysia (MAS); Nur Dhabitah Sabri; Leong Mun Yee | 46.80 | 49.80 | 61.20 | 56.64 | 67.20 | 281.64 |
| 2nd place, silver medalist(s) | Myanmar (MYA); Nay Chi Su Su Latt; Saw Hla Nandar | 43.20 | 46.20 | 51.75 | 57.96 | 40.80 | 239.91 |
| 3rd place, bronze medalist(s) | Indonesia (INA); Dewi Setyaningsih; Linadini Yasmin | 43.20 | 42.00 | 53.10 | 48.96 | 52.20 | 239.46 |
| 4 | Thailand (THA); Surincha Booranapol; Jiratchaya Yothong Yos | 39.00 | 40.20 | 46.92 | 53.76 | 45.24 | 225.12 |
| 5 | Singapore (SIN); Kimberly Chan; Fong Arizir Li | 41.40 | 36.00 | 40.80 | 46.23 | 42.00 | 206.43 |
