= Jaclyn Pangilinan =

Filipino-American swimmer (born 1986)

Personal information
- Full name: Jaclyn Marissa Pangilinan
- Nickname: Jackie
- Born: 29 May 1986 (age 40) Clifton, New Jersey, United States
- Height: 1.68 m (5 ft 6 in)
- Weight: 63 kg (139 lb)

Sport
- Sport: Swimming
- Strokes: Breaststroke
- College team: Harvard University (U.S.)
- Coach: Stephanie Morawski (U.S.)
Medal record
Women's swimming
Representing the Philippines
Southeast Asian Games
Silver medal – second place	2005 Manila	200 m breaststroke
Silver medal – second place	2005 Manila	4×100 m medley
Bronze medal – third place	2005 Manila	100 m breaststroke
Bronze medal – third place	2007 Bangkok	100 m breaststroke
Bronze medal – third place	2007 Bangkok	200 m breaststroke

Jaclyn Pangilinan (born May 29, 1986) is a Filipino-American former swimmer, who specialized in breaststroke events. She is a two-time Filipino record holder, a four-time Ivy League champion (2005, 2006, and 2008) in the 100 and 200 m breaststroke, and a multiple-time medalist at the Southeast Asian Games (2005 and 2007). Born to a Filipino father, and an American mother, Pangilinan holds a dual citizenship to compete collegiately and internationally in swimming.

Pangilinan qualified for two swimming events, as a member of the Philippine team, at the 2004 Summer Olympics in Athens, by achieving FINA B-standard entry times of 1:12.82 (100 m breaststroke) and 2:35.01 (200 m breaststroke) from the USA National Championships in College Park, Maryland (2003) and in Orlando, Florida.

In the 100 m breaststroke, Pangilinan challenged seven other swimmers on the third heat, including Singapore's Nicolette Teo, who later rivaled her at the Southeast Asian Games. Swimming in lane eight, she eclipsed a personal best of 1:12.47 to touch out Teo and pick up a fifth spot and thirty-first overall by four tenths of a second (0.40). In the 200 m breaststroke, Pangilinan blasted a new Filipino record of 2:33.38 to lead the first heat against Teo and Finland's Eeva Saarinen. Pangilinan missed the semifinals by more than a second, as she placed twentieth overall in the preliminaries.

Shortly after her first and only Olympics, Pangilinan attended the Harvard University in Cambridge, Massachusetts, where she majored in economics, and trained for the Harvard Crimson swimming team under head coach Stephanie Morowski. Despite her prior commitments in the University, Pangilinan still competed for her father's home nation in international tournaments.

At the 2005 Southeast Asian Games in Manila, Pangilinan won a total of two medals: a silver in the 200 m breaststroke (2:35.58) and a bronze in the 100 m breaststroke (1:12.73). Pangilinan decided to pull out from the Asian Games in Doha, Qatar, because of her academic commitments at Harvard, but made her second SEA Games stint in 2007, where she claimed four bronze medals in the same stroke and medley relays.

After retiring from swimming career and graduating from Harvard in 2008, Pangilinan pursued her MBA degree at the University of Pennsylvania in Philadelphia, Pennsylvania.
