= Saw Yi Khy =

Malaysian swimmer

Personal information
- Full name: Saw Yi Khy
- National team: Malaysia
- Born: 1 July 1986 (age 40) George Town, Penang, Malaysia
- Height: 1.76 m (5 ft 9 in)
- Weight: 70 kg (154 lb)

Sport
- Sport: Swimming
- Strokes: Freestyle
- Club: Bolles School Sharks (U.S.)
- College team: University of North Carolina (U.S.)
Medal record
Men's swimming
Representing Malaysia
Southeast Asian Games
Bronze medal – third place	2003 Hanoi	1500 m freestyle

Saw Yi Khy (born 1 July 1986) is a Malaysian former swimmer, who specialised in long-distance freestyle events. He clinched a bronze medal in the 1500 m freestyle at the 2003 Southeast Asian Games in Hanoi, Vietnam with a time of 16:07.22. Saw is also a former varsity swimmer for the Bolles School Sharks in Jacksonville, Florida, alongside his teammate Siow Yi Ting.

Saw qualified for the men's 1500 m freestyle at the 2004 Summer Olympics in Athens, by eclipsing a FINA B-cut of 15:58.19 from the Malaysian Open in Kuala Lumpur. Saw participated in the first heat against two other swimmers Giancarlo Zolezzi of Chile and defending SEA Games silver medalist Charnvudth Saengsri of Thailand. He rounded out a small field to last place by a 5.86-second margin behind Zolezzi in 16:06.38. Saw failed to advance into the final, as he placed thirty-second overall in the preliminaries.

Apart from his duties in Bolles School, Saw is also a member of the swimming team for North Carolina Tar Heels, and a business administration graduate at the University of North Carolina in Chapel Hill, North Carolina. Yi-khy no longer swims competitively.
