= Arwut Chinnapasaen =

Thai swimmer (born 1980)

Arwut Chinnapasaen OLY
Personal information
- Full name: Arwut Chinnapasaen
- National team: Thailand
- Born: 3 December 1980 (age 45) Bangkok, Thailand
- Height: 1.87 m (6 ft 2 in)
- Weight: 75 kg (165 lb)

Sport
- Sport: Swimming
- Strokes: Freestyle
Medal record
Men's swimming
Representing Thailand
Southeast Asian Games
| Gold medal – first place | 2003 Hanoi | 50 m freestyle |
| Gold medal – first place | 2005 Manila | 50 m freestyle |
| Silver medal – second place | 2001 Kuala Lumpur | 50 m freestyle |
| Silver medal – second place | 2007 Bangkok | 50 m freestyle |
| Silver medal – second place | 2009 Vientiane | 50 m freestyle |

Arwut Chinnapasaen OLY (Thai: อาวุธ ชินนภาแสน; born December 3, 1980; nickname: 'X') is a Thai former swimmer, who specialized in sprint freestyle events. He claimed two gold medals in the 50 m freestyle at the Southeast Asian Games (2003 and 2005), before losing out to Daniel Coakley of the Philippines in 2007.

Chinnapasaen qualified for the men's 50 m freestyle at the 2004 Summer Olympics in Athens, by posting a FINA B-standard entry time of 23.20 from the Southeast Asian Games in Hanoi, Vietnam. He challenged seven other swimmers on the sixth heat, including three-time Olympian Julio Santos of Ecuador. He raced to sixth place by one hundredth of a second (0.01) behind Cyprus' Chrysanthos Papachrysanthou in 23.52. Chinnapasaen failed to advance into the semifinals, as he matched a forty-sixth place tie with SEA Games medalist and former rival Allen Ong of Malaysia in the preliminaries.

Chinnapasaen is currently Head of Aquatics at St Andrews International School Bangkok. He has been a swimming coach at St Andrews since August 2015.
