= Gary Tan (swimmer, born 1982) =

Singaporean swimmer

Personal information
- Full name: Gary Tan Lee Yu
- Born: April 21, 1982 (age 44)

Sport
- Sport: Swimming
Medal record
Representing Singapore
SEA Games
Gold medal – first place	2005 Laguna	4x100m freestyle relay
Gold medal – first place	2005 Laguna	4x200m freestyle relay
Silver medal – second place	1999 Brunei	100m backstroke
Silver medal – second place	1999 Brunei	200m backstroke
Silver medal – second place	2001 Kuala Lumpur	4x100m medley relay
Silver medal – second place	2003 Hanoi	200m freestyle
Silver medal – second place	2005 Laguna	200m backstroke
Bronze medal – third place	1999 Brunei	4x100m medley relay
Bronze medal – third place	2001 Kuala Lumpur	100m backstroke
Bronze medal – third place	2003 Hanoi	100m butterfly
Bronze medal – third place	2003 Hanoi	200m individual medley
Bronze medal – third place	2005 Laguna	200m butterfly
Bronze medal – third place	2005 Laguna	200m individual medley

Gary Tan Lee Yu (born 21 April 1982) is a Singaporean and former national swimmer. He is currently the Singapore national team's swimming coach. He had previously held several national swimming records in Singapore.

== Swimming career ==
On 18 June 2001 at the SEA Games Time Trials in the 200 Meters Backstroke he came in at 2:05.07 which is a record in Singapore.

On 7 December 2003 at the 22nd SEA Games in Hanoi, Vietnam, Gary won the bronze medal in the Men 200 Meters Medley with the time of 2:05.94 which is a record in Singapore.

On 24 June 2005 at the 1st Singapore National Swimming Championship, he won the Men 200 Meters Butterfly with the time of 2:04.00 which is a record in Singapore.

=== Coaching ===
Tan formerly worked at Swimfast Aquatic Club as a coach and also a director at Swimlab. He was also the head coach of the Phoenix Swim Team, which represents UWCSEA (United World College of South East Asia) Dover.

In 2011, Tan was suspended for a year for consideration for national coach accreditation after assisting a swimmer, Jeffrey Su, from Swimfast Aquatic Club to be absent without official leave when Su was supposed to be at Singapore Sports Council's physiotherapy and recovery sessions.

In 2014, he was named as assistant coach to Singapore's national swimming team and appointed to be the national coach in 2016 after the former national coach, Sergio Lopez, left after the 2016 Summer Olympics at Rio de Janeiro.

He was named Coach of the Year at the 2018 Singapore Sports Awards, at that time the fourth year in a row that a swimming coach had taken the award.

== Education ==
Tan attended Brigham Young University where he was on the swim team.
