= Kimberly Chan =

Singaporean diver

Personal information
- Full name: Kimberly Chan Wan Lin
- Born: 1994 (age 31–32) Singapore
- Education: Catholic Junior College; Singapore Management University
- Height: 1.51 m (4 ft 11 in)
- Weight: 41 kg (90 lb)

Sport
- Country: Singapore
- Sport: Diving
- Events: 10m, 10m synchro
- Coached by: Wan Jun
- Retired: 2018

Kimberly Chan Wan Lin is a former Singaporean diver. She participated in the FINA Diving Grand Prix, 2013 Southeast Asian Games and 2015 Southeast Asian Games. She retired in 2018 due to her back injury.

== Career ==
Chan, born in Singapore, has been doing gymnastics since she was young. She officially joined the national diving team in 2010 when Singapore hosted the Youth Olympic Games (YOG). She joined the national team as they were putting a diving team for the YOG and recruited gymnasts or former gymnasts to form the team.

Chan represented Singapore the 2013 Myanmar Games, where she partnered with Arizir Fong in the women's 10m synchronised platform, eventually finishing fifth. She also took part in the 28th Southeast Asian Games held in Singapore, where she finished fourth in the women's 10m platform.

Due to her back injury, Chan missed the chance to participate at the 2017 Southeast Asian Games. She eventually retired from competitive diving in 2018.

== Personal life ==
Chan has a younger brother, Jonathan Chan, who is also a national diver and represented Singapore at the 2020 Summer Olympics in the Men's 10 metre event.
