= Charnvudth Saengsri =

Thai swimmer (born 1987)

Charnvudth Saengsri OLY
Personal information
- Full name: Charnvudth Saengsri
- National team: Thailand
- Born: 22 March 1987 (age 39)
- Height: 1.75 m (5 ft 9 in)
- Weight: 75 kg (165 lb)

Sport
- Sport: Swimming
- Strokes: Freestyle
Medal record
Men's swimming
Representing Thailand
Southeast Asian Games
Gold medal – first place	2003 Hanoi	400 m freestyle
Silver medal – second place	2003 Hanoi	1500 m freestyle
Silver medal – second place	2005 Manila	1500 m freestyle
Bronze medal – third place	2005 Manila	400 m freestyle

Charnvudth Saengsri (Thai: ชาญวุฒิ แสงศรี; born March 22, 1987) is a Thai former swimmer, who specialized in long-distance freestyle events. He is a two-time silver medalist in the 1500 m freestyle at the Southeast Asian Games (2003 and 2005).

Saengsri qualified for two events, as Thailand's youngest swimmer (aged 17), at the 2004 Summer Olympics in Athens, by posting FINA B-standard entry times of 3:59.91 (400 m freestyle) and 15:56.22 (1500 m freestyle) from the 2003 Southeast Asian Games in Hanoi, Vietnam. On the first day of the Games, Saengsri placed thirty-third in the 400 m freestyle. He established a personal best and a Thai record of 3:59.89 to take a fourth spot in heat two, just 0.02 of a second faster than his entry time. In the 1500 m freestyle, Saengsri edged out Chile's Giancarlo Zolezzi and Malaysia's Saw Yi Khy to lead the first heat by a 6.06-second margin, breaking his own record time of 15:54.46. Saengsri failed to advance into the final, as he placed twenty-seventh overall in the preliminaries.
