= Andy Wibowo =

Indonesian swimmer (born 1980)

Personal information
- Full name: Andy Wibowo
- National team: Indonesia
- Born: 9 June 1980 (age 46) Temanggung, Central Java, Indonesia
- Height: 1.70 m (5 ft 7 in)
- Weight: 64 kg (141 lb)

Sport
- Sport: Swimming
- Strokes: Butterfly
Medal record
Men's swimming
Representing Indonesia
Southeast Asian Games
Silver medal – second place	2003 Hanoi	100 m butterfly
Bronze medal – third place	2007 Bangkok	100 m butterfly

Andy Wibowo (born June 9, 1980) is an Indonesian former swimmer, who specialized in butterfly events. He won a bronze medal in the 100 m butterfly (55.59) at the 2007 Southeast Asian Games in Bangkok, Thailand.

Wibowo qualified for the men's 100 m butterfly at the 2004 Summer Olympics in Athens, by posting a FINA B-standard of 55.86 from SEA Games in Hanoi, Vietnam. He challenged seven other swimmers in heat two, including 17-year-old Michal Rubáček of the Czech Republic. He raced to sixth place by nearly two seconds behind winner Rubacek, outside his entry time of 56.86. Wibowo failed to advance into the semifinals, as he placed fifty-fourth overall in the preliminaries.

In 2009, Wibowo embarked on a new career as a triathlete. Since then, he has competed in numerous tournaments across Southeast Asia, including the annual MRA Bali International Triathlon, where he claimed at least two age group titles.
