= Mark Chay =

Singaporean swimmer

Personal information
- Full name: Mark Chay Jung Jun
- National team: Singapore
- Born: 18 February 1982 (age 44) Singapore

Sport
- Sport: Swimming
Medal record
SEA Games
Gold medal – first place	2001 Kuala Lumpur	200m freestyle
Gold medal – first place	2005 Manila	4x100m freestyle relay
Gold medal – first place	2005 Manila	4x200m freestyle relay
Silver medal – second place	1999 Brunei	200m freestyle
Silver medal – second place	1999 Brunei	4x100m freestyle relay
Silver medal – second place	2003 Hanoi	200m freestyle
Silver medal – second place	2003 Hanoi	100m backstroke
Silver medal – second place	2005 Manila	100m backstroke
Bronze medal – third place	1999 Brunei	100m freestyle
Bronze medal – third place	2001 Kuala Lumpur	100m freestyle

Mark Chay Jung Jun (simplified Chinese: 蔡荣俊; born 18 February 1982) is a Singaporean former Nominated Member of Parliament and freestyle swimmer who has represented the country at the Summer Olympics. He is the secretary-general Singapore National Olympic Council and the chief development officer of the Global Esports Federation.

== Early life and education ==
Chay was born and raised in Singapore, where he developed a passion for swimming at a young age. He attended Anglo-Chinese School (Independent) and Anglo-Chinese Junior College. Chay's notable abilities in the pool earned him a scholarship to Brigham Young University (BYU) in Provo, Utah.

At BYU, he continued to maintain his performance in swimming while studying communications. While at the university, he won the Mountain West Conference championship. Chay graduated with a degree in communications.

== Career ==
Chay is currently the chief development officer of Global Esports Federation, a non-governmental organisation headquartered in Singapore that promotes esports.

=== Swimming career ===
Chay's international debut came at the 1997 Southeast Asian Games. Over the next eight years, he competed in seven SEA Games. In addition to his SEA Games success, Chay represented Singapore in two Olympic Games: Sydney 2000 and Athens 2004, the Asian Games in Bangkok 1998 and Busan 2002, and the Commonwealth Games in Kuala Lumpur 1998 and Manchester 2002.

Chay's performance in the 2000 Sydney Olympic Games, positioned him as the top Asian swimmer in the 200m freestyle event during that year. In 2005, Chay concluded his swimming career at the 2005 SEA Games, where he retired from international competition.

Chay retired from swimming in July 2007.

=== Sporting related career ===
Chay was previously the head coach of X Lab, a swimming academy.

Chay was appointed as Singapore's chef de mission for the 2014 Youth Olympic Games held at Nanjing, China and also one of the two deputy chefs de mission for the 2017 SEA Games held at Kuala Lumpur, Malaysia.

In June 2022, Chay was elected to the president of Singapore Aquatics for a two-year term. He became the secretary-general Singapore National Olympic Council in 2025.

=== Political career ===
On 14 January 2021, Chay was chosen as one of the 9 nominated members of parliament (NMP) for the 14th Parliament of Singapore, which began on 21 January 2021. After his appointment was announced, Chay said that he intends to promote sports as an agent of social change and a way to unify a nation, prompted by the impact of the COVID-19 pandemic on Singapore's sports scene. In addition, Chay plans to speak on economic issues.

== Personal life ==
Chay is married to Joanna Seetoh and they have a daughter.

In March 2024, Chay was diagnosed with chronic myeloid leukaemia.
