= Moe Thu Aung =

Burmese swimmer (born 1981)

Personal information
- Full name: Moe Thu Aung
- National team: Myanmar
- Born: 10 June 1981 (age 45) Yangon, Myanmar
- Height: 1.71 m (5 ft 7 in)
- Weight: 53 kg (117 lb)

Sport
- Sport: Swimming
- Strokes: Freestyle, butterfly
- Club: MLC Marlins (AUS)
- Coach: John Bladon (AUS)
Medal record
Women's swimming
Representing Myanmar
Southeast Asian Games
Gold medal – first place	2001 Kuala Lumpur	50 m freestyle
Silver medal – second place	2001 Kuala Lumpur	100 m freestyle
Silver medal – second place	2001 Kuala Lumpur	100 m butterfly
Silver medal – second place	2003 Hanoi	50 m freestyle
Silver medal – second place	2003 Hanoi	100 m freestyle
Silver medal – second place	2003 Hanoi	100 m butterfly
Silver medal – second place	2005 Manila	100 m butterfly
Bronze medal – third place	2005 Manila	50 m freestyle
Bronze medal – third place	2005 Manila	100 m freestyle
Bronze medal – third place	2005 Manila	200 m freestyle

Moe Thu Aung (born 10 June 1981) is a Burmese former swimmer, who specialized in sprint freestyle and butterfly events. Aung represented Myanmar at the 2000 Summer Olympics, received a total of ten medals (one gold, six silver, and three bronze) from all editions of the Southeast Asian Games since 2001, and later became a top 8 finalist in a sprint freestyle double at the 2002 Asian Games. During her sporting career, she swam and trained for the MLC School's swimming club, also known as MLC Marlins, under an Australian-based coach John Bladon.

Aung competed only in the women's 50 m freestyle at the 2000 Summer Olympics in Sydney. She received a ticket from FINA, under a Universality program, without meeting an entry time. She participated in heat one against two other swimmers, 12-year-old Fatema Hameed Gerashi of Bahrain and Paula Barila Bolopa of Equatorial Guinea. Aung pulled away from a small field to an unexpected triumph in a new Burmese record of 26.80, finishing farther ahead of Gerashi, who was later disqualified from the race for a no false-start rule attempt, and Bolopa, who posted the event's slowest time in Olympic history (1:03.97). Aung's surprising reward was not enough to put her through to the semifinals, as she placed thirty-ninth overall out of 74 swimmers in the prelims.

At the 2001 Southeast Asian Games in Kuala Lumpur, Malaysia, Aung edged out Singapore's top favorite Joscelin Yeo by seven hundredths of a second (0.07) to capture the 50 m freestyle title in 26.34, adding it to two other silver medals from her hardware in the 100 m freestyle (57.61) and in the 100 m butterfly (1:01.76).

At the 2002 Asian Games in Busan, South Korea, Aung failed to medal in any of her individual events, finishing seventh each in the 50 m freestyle (26.72) and in the 100 m freestyle (58.01).
