= Trương Ngọc Tuấn =

Vietnamese swimmer

Personal information
- Born: 23 October 1976 (age 49)

Sport
- Sport: Swimming
Medal record
Representing Vietnam
SEA Games
| Silver medal – second place | 2003 Hanoi | 200m backstroke |

Trương Ngọc Tuấn (born 23 October 1976) is a Vietnamese swimmer. He competed in the men's 200 metre backstroke event at the 1996 Summer Olympics.
