= Yuliya Rissik =

Kazakhstani swimmer

Personal information
- Full name: Yuliya Vitalyevna Rissik
- National team: Kazakhstan
- Born: 13 January 1987 (age 39) Karaganda Region, Kazakh SSR, Soviet Union
- Height: 1.76 m (5 ft 9 1/2 in)
- Weight: 66 kg (146 lb)

Sport
- Sport: Swimming
- Strokes: Freestyle

Yuliya Vitalyevna Rissik (Kazakh: Юлия Витальевна Риссик; born January 13, 1987) is a Kazakh former swimmer, who specialized in freestyle events. Rissik qualified for the women's 200 m freestyle at the 2004 Summer Olympics in Athens, by clearing a FINA B-cut of 2:06.02 from the Kazakhstan Open Championships in Almaty. Swimming in heat one, she finished the race in last place and forty-first overall against Thailand's Pilin Tachakittiranan and Chinese Taipei's Yang Chin-Kuei with a slowest time of 2:09.93.
