= Donny Utomo =

Indonesian swimmer (born 1979)

Donny Utomo OLY
Personal information
- Full name: Donny Budiarto Utomo
- Born: 13 March 1979 (age 47)
- Height: 1.72 m (5 ft 8 in)
- Weight: 55 kg (121 lb)

Sport
- Country: Indonesia
- Sport: Swimming
- Strokes: Butterfly
Medal record
Men's swimming
Representing Indonesia
Southeast Asian Games
Gold medal – first place	2003 Hanoi	200 m butterfly
Gold medal – first place	2005 Manila	200 m butterfly
Silver medal – second place	2005 Manila	100 m butterfly
Silver medal – second place	2007 Bangkok	200 m butterfly
Silver medal – second place	2009 Vientiane	100 m butterfly
Silver medal – second place	2009 Vientiane	200 m butterfly

Donny Budiarto Utomo (born 13 March 1979) is an Indonesian swimmer, who specialized in butterfly events. He is a former multiple-time national record holder for the men's butterfly, and a six-time medalist at the Southeast Asian Games. He is also a two-time defending champion for the 200 m butterfly, before losing out to Malaysia's Daniel Bego at the 2007 Southeast Asian Games in Bangkok, Thailand.

Utomo made his first Indonesian team at the 2004 Summer Olympics in Athens, where he competed in the men's 200 m butterfly. Swimming in heat one, he edged out Honduras' Roy Barahona to take a second spot and thirty-third overall by 0.28 of a second in 2:05.71.

At the 2008 Summer Olympics in Beijing, Utomo qualified again for the 200 m butterfly. After winning a silver medal from SEA Games in Bangkok, Thailand, his entry time of 2:00.81 was officially accredited under a FINA B-standard. He challenged seven other swimmers in heat two, including his former rival James Walsh of the Philippines, and four-time Olympian Vladan Marković of the newly independent nation Serbia. He rounded out the field to last place by 0.32 of a second behind Markovic with a slowest time of 2:03.44. Utomo failed to advance into the semifinals, as he placed forty-fourth overall in the preliminaries.
