= Leong Mun Yee =

Malaysian diver (born 1984)

Datuk Leong Mun Yee
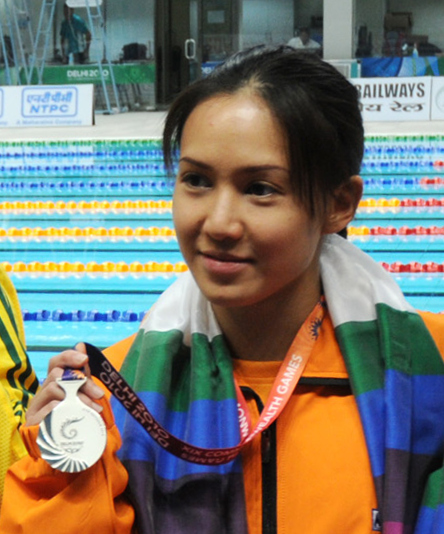
- Leong at the 2010 Commonwealth Games

Personal information
- Nationality: Malaysian
- Born: 4 December 1984 (age 41) Ipoh, Perak, Malaysia
- Height: 1.63 m (5 ft 4 in)
- Weight: 55 kg (121 lb)

Sport
- Country: Malaysia
- Sport: Diving
- Event(s): 1 m, 3 m, 3 m synchro, 10 m, 10 m synchro
- Partner: Pandelela Rinong
- Retired: 2022
Medal record
Event	1st	2nd	3rd
World Championships	0	1	2
FINA Diving World Series	0	1	0
Commonwealth Games	0	1	2
Summer Universiade	0	0	2
Southeast Asian Games	17	5	5
Asian Games	0	2	5
World Championships
Silver medal – second place	2019 Gwangju	10 m synchro
Bronze medal – third place	2009 Rome	10 m synchro
Bronze medal – third place	2013 Barcelona	10 m synchro
World Series
Silver medal – second place	2011 Beijing	10 m synchro
Asian Games
Silver medal – second place	2010 Guangzhou	3 m synchro
Silver medal – second place	2010 Guangzhou	10 m synchro
Bronze medal – third place	2002 Busan	3 m synchro
Bronze medal – third place	2006 Doha	3 m springboard
Bronze medal – third place	2006 Doha	3 m synchro
Bronze medal – third place	2014 Incheon	10 m synchro
Bronze medal – third place	2018 Jakarta-Palembang	10 m synchro
Commonwealth Games
Silver medal – second place	2010 New Delhi	10 m synchro
Bronze medal – third place	2018 Gold Coast	3 m synchro
Bronze medal – third place	2018 Gold Coast	10 m synchro
Southeast Asian Games
Gold medal – first place	2001 Kuala Lumpur	3 m springboard
Gold medal – first place	2001 Kuala Lumpur	3 m synchro
Gold medal – first place	2001 Kuala Lumpur	10 m platform
Gold medal – first place	2001 Kuala Lumpur	10 m synchro
Gold medal – first place	2003 Hanoi	10 m platform
Gold medal – first place	2005 Manila	10 m platform
Gold medal – first place	2005 Manila	10 m synchro
Gold medal – first place	2007 Nakhon Ratchasima	1 m springboard
Gold medal – first place	2007 Nakhon Ratchasima	3 m synchro
Gold medal – first place	2009 Vientiane	10 m synchro
Gold medal – first place	2009 Vientiane	3 m synchro
Gold medal – first place	2011 Palembang	3 m synchro
Gold medal – first place	2011 Palembang	10 m synchro
Gold medal – first place	2013 Naypyidaw	10 m synchro
Gold medal – first place	2015 Singapore	10 m synchro
Gold medal – first place	2017 Kuala Lumpur	10m synchro
Gold medal – first place	2017 Kuala Lumpur	10m mixed synchro
Silver medal – second place	1999 Brunei	3 m springboard
Silver medal – second place	2003 Hanoi	10 m synchro
Silver medal – second place	2003 Hanoi	3 m synchro
Silver medal – second place	2005 Manila	1 m springboard
Silver medal – second place	2007 Nakhon Ratchasima	3 m springboard
Bronze medal – third place	1999 Brunei	10 m platform
Bronze medal – third place	2003 Hanoi	3 m springboard
Bronze medal – third place	2005 Manila	3 m springboard
Bronze medal – third place	2005 Manila	3 m synchro
Bronze medal – third place	2009 Vientiane	3 m springboard
Universiade
Bronze medal – third place	2011 Shenzhen	Team
Bronze medal – third place	2011 Shenzhen	10 m synchro

Datuk Leong Mun Yee PMW (Chinese: 梁敏喻; pinyin: Liáng Mǐnyù, born 4 December 1984) is a retired Malaysian diver. She competed at the 2000, 2004, 2008 and 2012 Olympics with the best result of seventh place in the 10 m synchronised platform event in 2012. Her appearance at the 2008 Summer Olympics made her the first Malaysian diver to compete at three Olympics. The bronze medal that she and Pandelela Rinong won at the 2009 World Championships was the first World Championship medal for Malaysia.

== Career ==
=== Diving career ===
She was originally a swimmer but switched to diving at the age of 10 as part of Malaysia's programme to prepare a diving team for the 1998 Commonwealth Games. Leong announced her retirement on 5 January 2022.

=== Post-retirement career ===
Leong opened a diving academy, "DLMY x DSA" at the National Aquatics Centre in Bukit Jalil on 8 April 2023. She hopes to produce Olympic champions in the future.

== Personal life ==
She graduated from Universiti Putra Malaysia with a Bachelor of Communication in 2017 and a Master of Corporate Communication in 2022.

She got married in mid 2022 and gave birth to her first son named Lucas Jia Kiang in May 2023 at a medical centre in Subang.

== Filmography ==
=== 2022 ===
In December 2022, Leong has joining the reality show from Astro Warna, The Masked Singer Malaysia in season 3 as Lolipop.

== Honour ==
- Federal Territory (Malaysia)
  - Knight Commander of the Order of the Territorial Crown (PMW) – Datuk (2022)
