= Felix Sutanto =

Indonesian swimmer

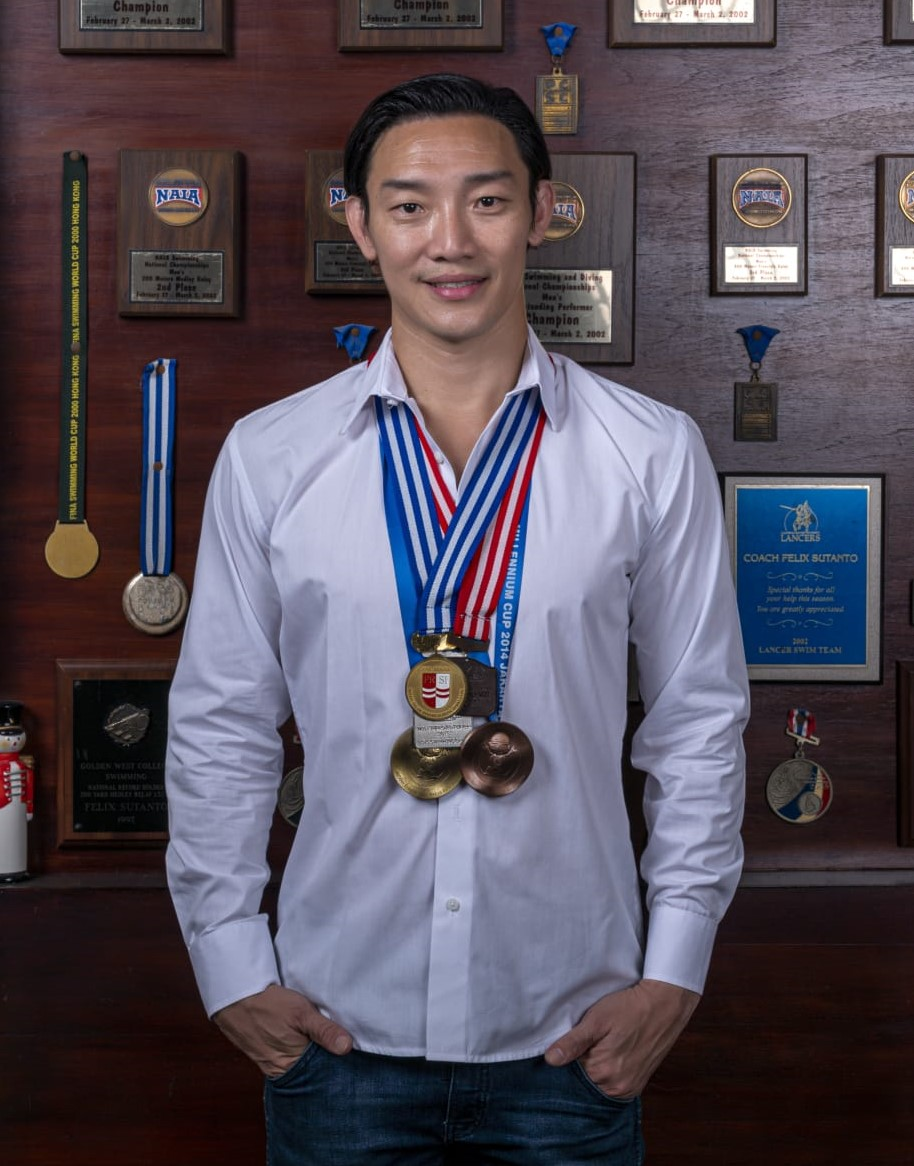

Personal information
- Full name: Felix Christiadi Sutanto
- Nationality: Indonesia
- Born: 24 December 1975 (age 50) Surabaya, Indonesia
- Height: 1.75 m (5 ft 9 in)
- Weight: 67 kg (148 lb)

Sport
- Sport: Swimming
- Strokes: Individual medley
- College team: CBU Lancers (USA)
- Coach: Rick Rowland
Medal record
Men's swimming
Representing Indonesia
FINA Swimming World Cup
Gold medal – first place	2000 Hong Kong	50 m backstroke
SEA Games
Gold medal – first place	1993 Singapore	4x100 m freestyle
Gold medal – first place	1997 Jakarta	200 m medley
Gold medal – first place	1999 Bandar Seri Begawan	4x100 m freestyle
Gold medal – first place	2005 Manila	4×100 m medley
Silver medal – second place	2005 Manila	4×100 m freestyle
Bronze medal – third place	1999 Bandar Seri Begawan	100 m backstroke
Bronze medal – third place	1999 Bandar Seri Begawan	200 m backstroke
Bronze medal – third place	1999 Bandar Seri Begawan	200 m medley

Felix Christiadi Sutanto (born December 24, 1975, in Surabaya) is a retired Indonesian swimmer, who specialized in individual medley events. He represented Indonesia, along with his twin brother Albert, at the 2000 Summer Olympics, and later received a total of sixteen All-American titles at the NAIA Men's Swimming and Diving Championships, while studying in the United States. Because of his tremendous career in college swimming, Sutanto was named the 2002 and 2003 Most Outstanding Male Swimmer of the Year by the National Association of Intercollegiate Athletics (NAIA).

Sutanto accepted an athletic scholarship to attend the California Baptist University in Riverside, California, where he majored in business administration, and played for the California Baptist Lancers swimming and diving team under head coach Rick Rowland. While swimming for the Lancers, Sutanto received sixteen All-American titles, and held three meet records in the 100-yard backstroke, 200-yard backstroke, and 200-yard individual medley at the NAIA Men's Swimming and Diving Championships. He was also named the 2002 and 2003 NAIA's Most Outstanding Male Swimmer of the Year, before graduating from the university in the spring of 2004.

A member of the Indonesian squad, Sutanto competed only in the men's 200 m individual medley at the 2000 Summer Olympics in Sydney. He achieved a FINA B-cut of 2:08.84 from the Asian Swimming Championships in Busan, South Korea. He challenged seven other swimmers in heat one, including Kuwait's four-time Olympian Sultan Al-Otaibi. Entering the Games with a top-seeded time, Sutanto enjoyed a powerful lead in the first three lengths, but fell short on the freestyle leg to register a fourth-place finish in 2:09.77, almost a 1.9-second deficit from winner Andrei Pakin of Kyrgyzstan. Sutanto failed to advance into the semifinals, as he placed fiftieth overall in the prelims.

Five years later, at the 2005 SEA Games in Manila, Sutanto helped his teammates Herry Yudhianto, legend Richard Sam Bera, and his twin brother Albert capture a medley relay title in a time of 3:51.51.
