= Kim Hyun-joo (swimmer) =

South Korean swimmer (born 1986)

Personal information
- Full name: Kim Hyun-joo
- National team: South Korea
- Born: 2 January 1986 (age 40)
- Height: 1.74 m (5 ft 9 in)
- Weight: 63 kg (139 lb)

Korean name
- Hangul: 김현주
- RR: Gim Hyeonju
- MR: Kim Hyŏnju

Sport
- Sport: Swimming
- Strokes: Freestyle
Medal record
Women's swimming
Representing South Korea
Asian Games
Bronze medal – third place	2002 Busan	4×100 m freestyle
Bronze medal – third place	2002 Busan	4×200 m freestyle

Kim Hyun-joo (Korean: 김현주; born January 2, 1986) is a South Korean former swimmer, who specialized in freestyle events. She won a total of two bronze medals, as a member of the South Korean team, in the 4 × 100 m freestyle relay (3:44.81) and 4 × 200 m freestyle relay (8:19.62) at the 2002 Asian Games in Busan, South Korea.

Kim qualified for two swimming events at the 2004 Summer Olympics by clearing a FINA B-standard entry time of 2:01.50 (200 m freestyle) from the World Championships in Barcelona, Spain. She also teamed up with Ryu Yoon-ji, Sun So-eun, and Shim Min-ji in the 4 × 100 m freestyle relay. Swimming the anchor leg, Kim recorded a split of 55.83, but the South Koreans missed the final by two seconds outside the top 8, in a time of 3:44.84.

In the 200 m freestyle, Kim challenged seven other swimmers on the fourth heat, including top medal favorite Dana Vollmer of the United States. She rounded out the field to last place by a 1.62-second margin behind Slovenia's Sara Isaković in 2:03.33. Kim failed to advance into the semifinals, as she placed twenty-sixth overall in the prelims.
