= Swimming at the 2003 SEA Games =

Aquatics at the 2003 SEA Games

The Swimming competition at the 22nd SEA Games was held from 1 to 10 December 2003 in My Dinh Aquatics Centre, Hanoi, Vietnam. The competition featured 32 events (16 male, 16 female) swum in a long course (50m) pool.

== Medal summary ==
=== Medal table ===
Key

* Host nation (Vietnam)

Rank	Nation	Gold	Silver	Bronze	Total
1	Thailand (THA)	13	8	9	30
2	Singapore (SIN)	8	8	6	22
3	Malaysia (MAS)	8	4	4	16
4	Philippines (PHI)	2	6	5	13
5	Indonesia (INA)	1	1	5	7
6	Myanmar (MYA)	0	4	0	4
7	Vietnam (VIE)*	0	1	3	4
8	Cambodia (CAM)	0	0	0	0
8	Laos (LAO)	0	0	0	0
Totals (9 entries)		32	32	32	96

=== Medalists ===
Men's events

Event	Gold		Silver		Bronze	
50 m freestyle	(Thailand) Arwut Chinnapasaen	23.33	(Malaysia) Allen Ong Hou Ming	23.69	(Indonesia) Richard Sam Bera	23.73
100 m freestyle	(Malaysia) Allen Ong Hou Ming	51.57	(Singapore) Mark Chay	51.96	(Philippines) Miguel Molina	52.85
200 m freestyle	(Philippines) Miguel Molina	1:52.89	(Singapore) Gary Tan	1:53.58	(Malaysia) Daniel Bego	1:55.36
400 m freestyle	(Thailand) Charnvudth Saengsri	3:59.91	(Philippines) Miguel Mendoza	4:03.54	(Philippines) Miguel Molina	4:05.12
1500 m freestyle	(Philippines) Miguel Mendoza	15:49.55	(Thailand) Charnvudth Saengsri	15:56.22	(Malaysia) Saw Yi Khy	16:07.22
100 m backstroke	(Malaysia) Alex Lim Keng Liat	57.51	(Singapore) Mark Chay	59.14	(Thailand) Suriya Suksuphak	59.80
200 m backstroke	(Malaysia) Alex Lim Keng Liat	2:04.11	(Vietnam) Truong Ngoc Tuan	2:08.00	(Thailand) Suriya Suksuphak	2:09.51
100 m breaststroke	(Thailand) Ratapong Sirisanont	1:03.13	(Thailand) Vorrawuti Aumpiwan	1:03.94	(Vietnam) Nguyen Huu Viet	1:04.77
200 m breaststroke	(Thailand) Ratapong Sirisanont	2:16.67	(Thailand) Vorrawuti Aumpiwan	2:18.18	(Philippines) Miguel Molina	2:20.81
100 m butterfly	(Malaysia) Alex Lim Keng Liat	55.04	(Indonesia) Andy Wibowo	55.86	(Singapore) Gary Tan	56.33
200 m butterfly	(Indonesia) Donny Utomo	2:04.17	(Thailand) Ratapong Sirisanont	2:04.32	(Indonesia) Albert Christiadi Sutanto	2:05.03
200 m individual medley	(Thailand) Ratapong Sirisanont	2:03.54	(Philippines) Miguel Molina	2:05.57	(Singapore) Gary Tan	2:05.94
400 m individual medley	(Thailand) Ratapong Sirisanont	4:23.20	(Philippines) Miguel Molina	4:23.26	(Philippines) Carlo Piccio	4:31.52
4 × 100 m freestyle relay	Singapore	3:28.42	Malaysia	3:30.99	Indonesia	3:31.86
4 × 200 m freestyle relay	Malaysia	7:43.11	Singapore	7:43.86	Thailand	7:44.31
4 × 100 m medley relay	Thailand	3:51.33	Malaysia	3:53.05	Singapore	3:53.06

Women's events

Event	Gold		Silver		Bronze	
50 m freestyle	(Singapore) Joscelin Yeo Wei Ling	26.42	(Myanmar) Moe Thu Aung	26.74	(Malaysia) Chui Lai Kwan	27.22
100 m freestyle	(Singapore) Joscelin Yeo Wei Ling	56.78	(Myanmar) Moe Thu Aung	58.05	(Thailand) Pilin Tachakittiranan	58.74
200 m freestyle	(Thailand) Pilin Tachakittiranan	2:05.19	(Myanmar) Moe Thu Aung	2:05.55	(Thailand) Nipaporn Tangtorrit	2:07.43
400 m freestyle	(Thailand) Pilin Tachakittiranan	4:21.57	(Singapore) Christel Bouvron Mei Yen	4:24.23	(Thailand) Chorkaew Choompol	4:26.90
800 m freestyle	(Thailand) Pilin Tachakittiranan	9:02.12	(Thailand) Chorkaew Choompol	9:08.02	(Malaysia) Khoo Cai Lin	9:09.47
100 m backstroke	(Thailand) Chonlathorn Vorathamrong	1:05.47	(Philippines) Lizza Danila	1:07.00	(Indonesia) Elsa Manora Nasution	1:07.38
200 m backstroke	(Thailand) Chonlathorn Vorathamrong	2:19.11	(Philippines) Lizza Danila	2:21.48	(Singapore) Bernadette Lee Jing Fei	2:23.95
100 m breaststroke	(Malaysia) Siow Yi Ting	1:13.31	(Singapore) Nicolette Teo	1:13.67	(Thailand) Tassamol Petchsangroj	1:14.11
200 m breaststroke	(Malaysia) Siow Yi Ting	2:32.25	(Singapore) Nicolette Teo	2:36.36	(Thailand) Tassamol Petchsangroj	2:38.41
100 m butterfly	(Singapore) Joscelin Yeo Wei Ling	1:01.32	(Myanmar) Moe Thu Aung	1:01.74	(Singapore) Christel Bouvron Mei Yen	1:04.50
200 m butterfly	(Singapore) Christel Bouvron Mei Yen	2:17.72	(Philippines) Maria Georgina Gordeonco	2:19.99	(Thailand) Pilin Tachakittiranan	2:20.15
200 m individual medley	(Singapore) Joscelin Yeo Wei Ling	2:17.98	(Malaysia) Siow Yi Ting	2:18.45	(Singapore) Nicolette Teo	2:22.85
400 m individual medley	(Malaysia) Siow Yi Ting	4:54.39	(Thailand) Nimitta Thaveesupsoonthorn	4:59.18	(Vietnam) Vo Thi Thanh Vy	5:05.52
4 × 100 m freestyle relay	Singapore	3:54.47	Thailand	3:56.64	Indonesia	4:06.66
4 × 200 m freestyle relay	Thailand	8:34.30	Singapore	8:38.78	Philippines	8:54.33
4 × 100 m medley relay	Singapore	4:20.49	Thailand	4:24.93	Vietnam	4:27.79
