= Muhammad Nasrullah =

Indonesian diver

Personal information
- Nationality: Indonesian
- Born: 21 February 1982 (age 44)

Sport
- Sport: Diving
Medal record
Southeast Asian Games
Gold medal – first place	2009 Laos	Synchro platform
Gold medal – first place	2011 Indonesia	Synchro platform
Silver medal – second place	2009 Laos	10 m platform
Bronze medal – third place	2007 Thailand	10 m platform
Bronze medal – third place	2007 Thailand	Synchro platform
Bronze medal – third place	2011 Indonesia	10 m platform

Muhammad Nasrullah (born 21 February 1982) is an Indonesian diver. He competed in the men's 10 metre platform event at the 2000 Summer Olympics.
