= Park Kyung-hwa =

South Korean swimmer (born 1984)

Personal information
- Full name: Park Kyung-hwa
- National team: South Korea
- Born: 29 August 1984 (age 41)
- Height: 1.65 m (5 ft 5 in)
- Weight: 50 kg (110 lb)

Korean name
- Hangul: 박경화
- RR: Bak Gyeonghwa
- MR: Pak Kyŏnghwa

Sport
- Sport: Swimming
- Strokes: Butterfly
Medal record
Women's swimming
Representing South Korea
Asian Games
Bronze medal – third place	2002 Busan	4×100 m medley

Park Kyung-hwa (Korean: 박경화; born August 29, 1984) is a South Korean former swimmer, who specialized in butterfly events. She won a bronze medal as a member of the South Korean team in the 4 × 100 m medley relay (4:13.41), when her nation hosted the 2002 Asian Games in Busan.

Park qualified for the women's 100 m butterfly at the 2004 Summer Olympics in Athens, by clearing a FINA B-standard entry time of 1:01.79 from the Dong-A Swimming Tournament in Seoul. She challenged seven other swimmers on the second heat, including five-time Olympian Mette Jacobsen of Denmark. She rounded out the field to last place by a tenth of a second (0.10) behind Hong Kong's Sze Hang Yu in 1:02.52. Park failed to advance into the semifinals, as she placed thirty-third overall on the first day of preliminaries.
