= Miguel Molina (swimmer) =

Filipino swimmer (born 1984)

Miguel Molina OLY
Personal information
- Nickname: Migs
- National team: Philippines
- Born: Miguel Sacro Molina; July 22, 1984 (age 42) Quezon City, Philippines

Sport
- Sport: Swimming
Medal record
Representing Philippines
SEA Games
Gold medal – first place	2003 Hanoi	200m freestyle
Gold medal – first place	2005 Manila	200m breaststroke
Gold medal – first place	2005 Manila	200m individual medley
Gold medal – first place	2005 Manila	400m individual medley
Gold medal – first place	2007 Nakhon Ratchasima	200m individual medley
Gold medal – first place	2007 Nakhon Ratchasima	400m individual medley
Gold medal – first place	2007 Nakhon Ratchasima	4x100m medley relay
Gold medal – first place	2009 Vientiane	200m individual medley
Gold medal – first place	2009 Vientiane	400m individual medley
Silver medal – second place	2001 Kuala Lumpur	200m individual medley
Silver medal – second place	2003 Hanoi	200m individual medley
Silver medal – second place	2003 Hanoi	400m individual medley
Silver medal – second place	2005 Manila	200m freestyle
Silver medal – second place	2007 Nakhon Ratchasima	4x100m freestyle relay
Silver medal – second place	2009 Vientiane	200m freestyle
Silver medal – second place	2009 Vientiane	4x100m freestyle relay
Silver medal – second place	2009 Vientiane	4x200m freestyle relay
Bronze medal – third place	2003 Hanoi	100m freestyle
Bronze medal – third place	2003 Hanoi	400m freestyle
Bronze medal – third place	2003 Hanoi	200m breaststroke
Bronze medal – third place	2005 Manila	4x100m medley relay
Bronze medal – third place	2007 Nakhon Ratchasima	200m freestyle
Bronze medal – third place	2009 Vientiane	4x100m medley relay

Miguel "Migs" Sacro Molina (born July 22, 1984) is a swimmer from the Philippines. He is a national record-holder in four individual events (200-meter freestyle, 200-meter breaststroke, the 200- and 400-meter individual medley), and two relay events (the 400-meter medley relay and the 800-meter free relay). He is a much-bemedalled swimmer in SEAG competitions, having won 11 golds, 7 silvers, and 7 bronzes in all.

He twice competed in the Asian Games – in Doha in 2006 and Guangzhou in 2010 – but had to settle for fourth in Doha and fifth in Guangzhou in his favorite 400m IM.

He also competed in two Olympics, 2004 Athens and 2008 Beijing, but could not advance past the qualifying races.

== Personal life ==
Miguel moved to Tokyo, Japan when he was three years old, and attended St. Mary's International School. It was there in first grade that he first picked up swimming. His parents, Tomas Molina and Mitos Sacro, were both runners and basketball players. At St. Mary's, Miguel swam for all 12 years under Coach Dave Moodie.

Moodie later recommended that Molina swim under Nort Thornton at UC Berkeley. From 2002 to 2005, he posted a top-six time in six events for Cal.

Molina retired from swimming in 2010, at the age of 26. He was considering transitioning to triathlon in an interview in 2012.
