= Shim Min-ji =

South Korean swimmer (born 1983)

Personal information
- Full name: Shim Min-ji
- National team: South Korea
- Born: 25 April 1983 (age 43)
- Height: 1.68 m (5 ft 6 in)
- Weight: 54 kg (119 lb)

Sport
- Sport: Swimming
- Strokes: Freestyle, backstroke
Medal record
Women's swimming
Representing South Korea
Asian Games
Bronze medal – third place	1998 Bangkok	200 m backstroke
Bronze medal – third place	2002 Busan	4×100 m freestyle
Bronze medal – third place	2002 Busan	4×200 m freestyle
Bronze medal – third place	2002 Busan	4×100 m medley

Shim Min-ji (also Sim Min-ji, Korean: 심민지; born April 25, 1983) is a South Korean former swimmer, who specialized in freestyle and backstroke events. She is a two-time Olympian (2000 and 2004) and a three-time relay medalist at the Asian Games (2002).

Shim made her Olympic debut, as a 17-year-old teen, at the 2000 Summer Olympics in Sydney, where she competed in the women's 100 m backstroke. Swimming in heat three, Shim finished second behind Zimbabwe's Kirsty Coventry in 1:03.20, but missed the semifinals by 0.15 of a second, as she shared a nineteenth-place tie with Australia's Giaan Rooney in the preliminaries. She also placed seventeenth, as a member of the South Korean team, in the 4 × 100 m medley relay (4:16.93).

When her nation hosted the 2002 Asian Games in Busan, Shim won a total of three bronze medals: 4 × 100 m freestyle (3:44.81), 4 × 200 m freestyle (8:19.62), and 4 × 100 m medley relay (4:13.41). She also attempted for her fourth straight medal in the 100 m backstroke, but missed the podium by a 0.48-second margin behind Japan's Aya Terakawa.

At the 2004 Summer Olympics in Athens, Shim competed again in two swimming events. She cleared a FINA B-standard entry time of 1:02.87 (100 m backstroke) from the World Championships in Barcelona, Spain. She also teamed up with Ryu Yoon-Ji, Sun So-Eun, and Kim Hyun-Joo in the 4 × 100 m freestyle relay. Swimming the third leg, Shim recorded a split of 56.91, but the South Koreans missed the final by two seconds outside the top 8, in a time of 3:44.84.

In the 100 m backstroke, Shim challenged seven other swimmers on the fourth heat, including top medal favorites Laure Manaudou of France and Reiko Nakamura of Japan. She rounded out the field to last place by 0.67 of a second behind Canada's Erin Gammel in 1:03.14. Shim failed to advance into the semifinals, as she placed twenty-fourth overall in the preliminaries.
