= Ha Eun-ju =

South Korean swimmer (born 1986)

Personal information
- Full name: Ha Eun-ju
- National team: South Korea
- Born: 12 August 1986 (age 39)
- Height: 1.70 m (5 ft 7 in)
- Weight: 53 kg (117 lb)

Sport
- Sport: Swimming
- Strokes: Freestyle
Medal record
Women's swimming
Representing South Korea
Asian Games
Bronze medal – third place	2002 Busan	4×200 m freestyle

Ha Eun-ju (Korean: 김현주; born August 12, 1986) is a South Korean swimmer, who specialized in freestyle events. She won a bronze medal, as a member of the South Korean team, in the 4 × 200 m freestyle relay (8:19.62), when her nation hosted the 2002 Asian Games in Busan.

Ha qualified for the women's 400 m freestyle, as a 17-year-old, at the 2004 Summer Olympics in Athens. She eclipsed a FINA B-standard entry time of 4:20.56 from the Dong-A Swimming Tournament in Seoul. She challenged seven other swimmers on the second heat, including Jamaica's Janelle Atkinson, who finished fourth in Sydney (2000). She raced to seventh place by 0.07 of a second behind New Zealand's Rebecca Linton in 4:21.65. Ha failed to reach the top 8 final, as she placed thirty-second overall in the preliminaries.
