= Ryu Yoon-ji =

South Korean swimmer (born 1985)

Personal information
- Full name: Ryu Yoon-ji
- National team: South Korea
- Born: 22 December 1985 (age 40) Seoul, South Korea
- Height: 1.68 m (5 ft 6 in)
- Weight: 54 kg (119 lb)

Sport
- Sport: Swimming
- Strokes: Freestyle
- College team: Seoul National University
Medal record
Women's swimming
Representing South Korea
Asian Games
Bronze medal – third place	2002 Busan	4×100 m freestyle
Bronze medal – third place	2006 Doha	4×100 m medley

Ryu Yoon-ji (also Ryu Yun-ji, Korean: 류윤지; born December 22, 1985) is a South Korean former swimmer, who specialized in sprint freestyle events. She won two bronze medals, as a member of the South Korean swimming team, in freestyle and medley relays, at the 2002 Asian Games in Busan, South Korea, and at the 2006 Asian Games in Doha, Qatar.

Ryu qualified for two swimming events at the 2004 Summer Olympics in Athens, by breaking a South Korean record and clearing a FINA A-cut of 55.46 (100 m freestyle) from the Dong-A Swimming Tournament in Seoul. On the first day of the Games, Ryu teamed up with Sun So-Eun, Shim Min-Ji, and Kim Hyun-Joo in the women's 4×100 m freestyle relay. Swimming the second leg, Ryu recorded a fastest split time of 55.24 seconds, and the South Korean team went on to finish the first heat in fifth place, for a total time of 3:44.84.

In the women's 100 m freestyle, Ryu missed out the semifinals by a hundredth of a second (0.01) in 55.02, but offered a second chance, after Germany's Franziska van Almsick scratched the event to focus on German relay duty in the 800 m freestyle relay. Ryu failed to qualify for the final, as she finished her semifinal run with a second slowest time of 55.85 seconds. In her final event, 50 m freestyle, Ryu raced to fifth place in heat seven by 0.06 of a second behind Venezuela's Arlene Semeco in 26.26. Unlike her previous individual event, Ryu failed to advance into the semifinals, as she placed twenty-sixth out of 75 swimmers in the preliminary heats. She also tied her position with Puerto Rico's Vanessa García.
