= Chen Xiujun =

Former Chinese Olympic Swimmer

Personal information
- National team: China
- Born: January 20, 1986 (age 40) China

Sport
- Sport: Swimming
- Strokes: Backstroke

Chen Xiujun (born 20 January 1986) is a former Olympic-level backstroke swimmer from China. She swam for the China team at the 2004 Olympics, where the team placed 4th in the 4x 100 metres Medley Relay. Chen Xiujun also swam in the 2004 Summer Olympics see below for tables of best and previous times.

Personal Best Times
Event	Time	Medal	Pool Length	Age*	Competition	Comp Country	Date
Women 50 Backstroke	28.74	-	25m	16	FINA Swimming World Cup 2002-2003	USA	22/11/2002
Women 100 Backstroke	01:01.31	-	25m	17	FINA Swimming World Cup 2003-2004	RSA	06/12/2003
Women 200 Backstroke	02:10.76	-	25m	18	7th FINA World Swimming Championships (25m) 2004	USA	09/10/2004
Women 100 Backstroke	01:02.00	-	50m	18	Olympic Games Athens 2004	GRE	21/08/2004
Women 200 Backstroke	02:13.57	-	50m	16	14th Asian Games 2002	KOR	04/10/2002
Women 50 Backstroke	29.68	-	50m	18	Olympic Games Athens 2004	GRE	21/08/2004
Women 4x100 Medley Relay	04:03.35	-	50m	-	Olympic Games Athens 2004	GRE	21/08/2004

*Age of Athlete when personal best was set

Previous Results
Rank	Event	Time	Points	Tag	Age*	Competition	Comp Country	Date
7	Women 200m Backstroke	2:10.76	-	-	18	7th FINA World Swimming Championships (25m) 2004	USA	09/10/2004
4	Women 4x100m Medley Relay	4:03.35	-	-	18	Olympic Games Athens 2004	GRE	21/08/2004
34	Women 200m Backstroke	DSQ	-	-	18	Olympic Games Athens 2004	GRE	19/08/2004
5	Women 50m Backstroke	28.96	-	-	17	FINA Swimming World Cup 2003-2004	RSA	07/12/2003
5	Women 100m Backstroke	1:01.31	-	-	17	FINA Swimming World Cup 2003-2004	RSA	06/12/2003
5	Women 200m Backstroke	2:12.05	-	-	17	FINA Swimming World Cup 2003-2004	RSA	05/12/2003
22	Women 200m Backstroke	2:18.06	-	H	17	10th FINA World Championships 2003	ESP	25/07/2003
16	Women 100m Backstroke	1:03.19	-	SF	17	10th FINA World Championships 2003	ESP	21/07/2003
5	Women 50m Backstroke	28.84	-	-	16	FINA Swimming World Cup 2002-2003	USA	23/11/2002
6	Women 100m Backstroke	1:01.39	-	-	16	FINA Swimming World Cup 2002-2003	USA	23/11/2002
6	Women 100m Backstroke	1:02.64	-	-	16	FINA Swimming World Cup 2002-2003	BRA	17/11/2002
4	Women 200m Backstroke	2:14.06	-	-	16	FINA Swimming World Cup 2002-2003	BRA	16/11/2002
4	Women 200m Backstroke	2:13.57	-	-	16	14th Asian Games 2002	KOR	04/10/2002
5	Women 100m Backstroke	1:02.90	-	-	16	14th Asian Games 2002	KOR	02/10/2002
3	Women 100m Backstroke	1:01.66	-	-	14	FINA Swimming World Cup 2000-2001	CHN	02/12/2000
7	Women 50m Backstroke	29.17	-	-	14	FINA Swimming World Cup 2000-2001	CHN	01/12/2000
4	Women 200m Backstroke	2:12.52	-	-	14	FINA Swimming World Cup 2000-2001	CHN	01/12/2000

*Age of Athlete at event
