= Christel Bouvron =

Singaporean swimmer (born 1984)

Personal information
- Full name: Christel Bouvron Mei Yen
- National team: Singapore
- Born: 1 October 1984 (age 42) Singapore
- Height: 1.65 m (5 ft 5 in)
- Weight: 62 kg (137 lb)

Sport
- Sport: Swimming
- Strokes: Freestyle, butterfly
- College team: University of Notre Dame (U.S.)
Medal record
Women's swimming
Representing Singapore
Southeast Asian Games
Gold medal – first place	2003 Hanoi	200 m butterfly
Silver medal – second place	1999 Brunei Darussalam	400m freestyle
Silver medal – second place	1999 Brunei Darussalam	4 x 100m freestyle
Silver medal – second place	2003 Hanoi	400m freestyle
Bronze medal – third place	2003 Hanoi	100 m butterfly

Mei Yen “Christel” Bouvron (born 1 October 1984) is a Singaporean former swimmer, who specialised in freestyle and butterfly events. She is a two-time Olympian (2000 and 2004), a double finalist at the Asian Games (2002), and a gold medalist in the 200 m butterfly at the 2003 SEA Games. Bouvron also became the first swimmer to qualify for the Olympics since 1920.

== Education ==
Bouvron studied at Raffles Girls' School and Anglo-Chinese Junior College. In May 2002, Bouvron announced she was skipping the A level examinations and to study at the University of Notre Dame in South Bend, Indiana in August. Bouvron cited that US would be a more conducive place to train and study at the same time, "I don't want to do the A levels here because it is difficult to juggle both swimming and studies." Bouvron majored in anthropology.

== Career ==
During the 1999 SEA Games, Bouvron won the silver medal for the 400 m freestyle and broke the national record, formerly held by Joscelin Yeo, with a time of 4:21.85 . She later won the silver medal at the 4 × 100 m freestyle relay with Cheryl Chong, Phua Shu Yan and Yeo.

Bouvron made her first Singaporean team, as a 15-year-old teen, at the 2000 Summer Olympics in Sydney. She failed to advance into the succeeding round in any of her individual events, finishing thirty-sixth in the 400 m freestyle (4:25.16), and thirty-second in the 200 m butterfly (2:17.62).

In 2002, Bouvron was placed in the Singapore Sports Council's Athletes Career and Training Programme.

When South Korea hosted the 2002 Asian Games in Busan, Bouvron came in sixth in the 100 m butterfly, and eighth in the 200 m butterfly (2:17.42).

While studying at the University of Notre Dame, Bouvron trained for the Fighting Irish, the athlete team for the university.

In 2003, Bouvron won a total of two medals in the same stroke at the 2003 SEA Games in Hanoi, Vietnam. Out of four tries in swimming, she only captured a gold in the 200 m butterfly final with a decisive time of 2:17.72, touching out Philippines' Maria Gandionco by more than two seconds.

At the 2004 Summer Olympics in Athens, Bouvron shortened her program by competing only in the 200 m butterfly. After winning her first gold from SEA Games, her seed time of 2:17.72 was officially confirmed and placed under a FINA B-standard. Bouvron participated in the first of four heats against seven other swimmers, including 15-year-old Maria Bulakhova. She rounded out a field to last place with a slowest time of 2:26.21, nearly nine seconds off her personal best and nearly 14 seconds behind winner Bulakhova. Bouvron failed to advance into the semi-finals, as she placed thirty-second overall in the preliminaries. Singapore Swimming Association reported that she had breathing difficulties and a runny nose during the race.

In March 2005, Bouvron last competed at National Collegiate Athletic Association Championships and did not submit any times for the 2005 SEA Games. In July, while back in Singapore, Bouvron announced her intention to quit.

== Personal life ==
After the 2004 Summer Olympics when Bouvron reported to have breathing difficulties and a runny nose during 200m butterfly event, she was diagnosed with asthma.
