= Lizza Danila =

Filipino swimmer (born 1982)

Personal information
- Full name: Marie-Lizza Toinette Danila
- National team: Philippines
- Born: 17 September 1982 (age 43) San Pablo, Laguna, Philippines
- Height: 1.70 m (5 ft 7 in)
- Weight: 60 kg (132 lb)

Sport
- Sport: Swimming
- Strokes: Backstroke
Medal record
Women's swimming
Representing the Philippines
Southeast Asian Games
Silver medal – second place	1999 Brunei	100 m backstroke
Silver medal – second place	1999 Brunei	200 m backstroke
Silver medal – second place	2001 Kuala Lumpur	100 m backstroke
Silver medal – second place	2001 Kuala Lumpur	200 m backstroke
Silver medal – second place	2003 Hanoi	100 m backstroke
Silver medal – second place	2003 Hanoi	200 m backstroke

Marie-Lizza Toinette Danila (born September 17, 1982) is a Filipino former swimmer, who specialized in backstroke events. She represented the Philippines, as a 17-year-old, at the 2000 Summer Olympics, and later collected a total of six silver medals in a backstroke double at the Southeast Asian Games (1999, 2001, and 2003) before her official retirement in 2005. She is also a top 8 finalist at the 2002 Asian Games in Busan, South Korea.

== Career ==
Danila competed only in the women's 100 m backstroke at the 2000 Summer Olympics in Sydney. She achieved a FINA B-cut of 1:06.19 after winning a silver medal from the Southeast Asian Games in Bandar Seri Begawan, Brunei. Swimming in heat one, Danila, who just turned 18 on the second day of the Games, gave the Filipinos a further reason to celebrate, as she overhauled a 1:07 barrier and rocketed to a fantastic first-place finish in a sterling time of 1:06.48. Danila's blistering triumph was not worthy enough to put her through to the semifinals, as she placed thirty-seventh overall out of 47 swimmers in the prelims.

At the 2001 Southeast Asian Games in Kuala Lumpur, Malaysia, Danila defended her silver medals each in the 100 m backstroke (1:05.10) and in the 200 m backstroke (2:23.47), finishing behind Thailand's top favorite Chonlathorn Vorathamrong by more than a full body length.

Two years later, at the 2002 Asian Games in Busan, South Korea, Danila failed to medal in any of her individual events, finishing ninth in the 100 m backstroke (1:06.44), and eighth in the 200 m backstroke (2:22.19).
