= Sun So-eun =

South Korean swimmer (born 1988)

Personal information
- Full name: Sun So-eun
- National team: South Korea
- Born: 1 July 1988 (age 38) Seoul, South Korea
- Height: 1.59 m (5 ft 3 in)
- Weight: 58 kg (128 lb)

Korean name
- Hangul: 선소은
- RR: Seon Soeun
- MR: Sŏn Soŭn

Sport
- Sport: Swimming
- Strokes: Freestyle
Medal record
Women's swimming
Representing South Korea
Asian Games
Bronze medal – third place	2002 Busan	4×100 m freestyle
Bronze medal – third place	2002 Busan	4×100 m medley

Sun So-eun (Korean: 선소은; born July 1, 1988) is a South Korean former swimmer, who specialized in freestyle events. She won a total of two bronze medals, as a member of the South Korean team, in the 4×100 m freestyle (3:44.81) and 4×100 m medley relay (4:13.41) at the 2002 Asian Games in Busan.

Sun teamed up with Ryu Yoon-ji, Shim Min-ji, and Kim Hyun-joo in the 4×100 m freestyle relay at the 2004 Summer Olympics in Athens. Swimming the lead-off leg, Sun recorded a split of 56.86, but the South Koreans missed the final by two seconds outside the top 8, in a time of 3:44.84.
