= Nicolette Teo =

Singaporean swimmer

Personal information
- Full name: Nicolette Teo Wei Min
- Born: 19 April 1986 (age 40) Singapore
- Height: 1.73 m (5 ft 8 in)

Sport
- Sport: Swimming
- Event: Breaststroke

Achievements and titles
- Personal best: 100 Breast - 1:02.17
Medal record
Representing Singapore
SEA Games
| Gold medal – first place | 1999 Brunei | 200m breaststroke |
| Gold medal – first place | 2001 Kuala Lumpur | 100m breaststroke |
| Gold medal – first place | 2003 Hanoi | 4x100m freestyle relay |
| Gold medal – first place | 2003 Hanoi | 4x100m medley relay |
| Gold medal – first place | 2005 Laguna | 200m breaststroke |
| Gold medal – first place | 2005 Laguna | 4x100m medley relay |
| Gold medal – first place | 2007 Nakhon Ratchasima | 100m breaststroke |
| Gold medal – first place | 2007 Nakhon Ratchasima | 200m breaststroke |
| Gold medal – first place | 2007 Nakhon Ratchasima | 4x100m medley relay |
| Silver medal – second place | 2001 Kuala Lumpur | 200m breaststroke |
| Silver medal – second place | 2001 Kuala Lumpur | 4x100m freestyle relay |
| Silver medal – second place | 2001 Kuala Lumpur | 4x100m medley relay |
| Silver medal – second place | 2003 Hanoi | 100m breaststroke |
| Silver medal – second place | 2003 Hanoi | 200m breaststroke |
| Silver medal – second place | 2005 Laguna | 100m breaststroke |
| Silver medal – second place | 2005 Laguna | 200m individual medley |
| Bronze medal – third place | 2003 Hanoi | 200m individual medley |
- Updated on 18 December 2006

Nicolette Teo Wei Min (Teo Wei-min, simplified Chinese: 张维敏; traditional Chinese: 張維敏; pinyin: Zhāng Wéimǐn; born 19 April 1986) is a Singaporean swimmer who specializes in breaststroke.

== Education ==
Teo was a former student at Methodist Girls' School in Singapore. Teo represented Mission Viejo High School in the California Interscholastic Federation's swimming tournament. She finished second in the 100 yard Breast clocking in a time of 1:02.17 and finished 4th in the 200 yard IM event with the time of 2:04:79. She also topped the long course times for the 100 m and 200 m breaststroke events.

Teo swam for the University of California, Los Angeles. Teo earned her All-American honors at the NCAA Championships as a member of the 400 m Medley Relay team that placed 13th. She also placed 22nd and 29th in the 100 m and 200 m breaststroke events respectively in the same tournament.

== Career ==
=== Swimming ===
Teo represented Singapore in the 2000 Summer Olympics, 2004 Summer Olympics and 2008 Summer Olympics. She participated in the 1999, 2001, 2003, 2005 and 2007 Southeast Asian Games as well as the 2002 and 2006 Asian Games.

In 2002, Teo withdrew from the 2002 Commonwealth Games to concentrate on the 2002 Asian Games.

In 2005, Teo represented Singapore in the World Championships in the 50m, 100m and 200m breaststroke events.

In 2007, Teo won the gold medals for the 100m breaststroke and 200m breaststroke events and broke the national records with the timings of 1:10.15 and 2:31.96 respectively during the 2007 SEA Games. She won the 4x100m medley relay also.

=== Business ===
In 2019, Teo and Joel Blum founded the LA Spirits Awards, a modern spirits competition, in Los Angeles.

== Achievements ==
Nicolette Teo has many achievements, including:

- Olympic swimming Teo competed in the 2000, 2004, and 2008 Olympic Games as a breaststroke specialist. She made her Olympic debut in Sydney in 2000 at the age of 14, competing in the 200m event. She also competed in the 100m and 200m breaststroke events in subsequent Olympic Games.
- Southeast Asian Games Teo won nine gold medals, seven silver medals, and one bronze medal at the Southeast Asian Games.
- NCAA Championships Teo earned All-American honors as a member of the 400 m Medley Relay team at the NCAA Championships. She also placed 22nd and 29th in the 100 m and 200 m breaststroke events, respectively, at the same tournament.
- World Championships Teo represented Singapore in the World Championships in 2005, competing in the 50 m, 100 m, and 200 m breaststroke events.
- San Francisco World Spirits Competition Teo was the Managing Director of the San Francisco World Spirits Competition from 2015 to 2018.
- The Tasting Panel Magazine Teo was the Director of Marketing and Events at The Tasting Panel Magazine from 2011 to 2015.
- Blue Lifestyle Teo was the Marketing and Events Coordinator at Blue Lifestyle from 2009 to 2011

== SEA Games ==
Gold (9):

- 200 Breaststroke (1999) 2:36.27
- 100 Breaststroke (2001) 1:12.64
- 4x100 Freestyle Relay (2003) 3:54.47
- 4x100 Medley Relay (2003) 4:20.49
- 200 Breaststroke (2005) 2:34.56
- 4x100 Medley Relay (2005) 4:14.49

Silver (7):

- 200 Breaststroke (2001) 2:35.01
- 4x100 Freestyle Relay (2001) 3:54.75
- 4x100 Medley Relay (2001) 4:23.41
- 100 Breaststroke (2003) 1:13.67
- 200 Breaststroke (2003) 2:36.36
- 100 Breaststroke (2005) 1:11.80
- 200 IM (2005) 2:22.86

Bronze (1):

- 200 IM (2003) 2:22.85
