= Siow Yi Ting =

Malaysian swimmer

Personal information
- Nationality: Malaysian
- Born: 11 December 1985 (age 40) Negeri Sembilan, Malaysia
- Height: 5 ft 7 in (1.70 m)
- Weight: 108 lb (49 kg)

Sport
- Sport: Swimming
- Strokes: Breaststroke
- College team: Arkansas Razorbacks (USA; 2008-2010); Wisconsin Badgers (USA; 2006-2007)
Medal record
Representing Malaysia
SEA Games
Gold medal – first place	2001 Kuala Lumpur	200m breaststroke
Gold medal – first place	2003 Hanoi	100m breaststroke
Gold medal – first place	2003 Hanoi	200m breaststroke
Gold medal – first place	2003 Hanoi	200m individual medley
Silver medal – second place	2003 Hanoi	200m individual medley
Bronze medal – third place	2001 Kuala Lumpur	100m breaststroke

Siow Yi Ting (born 11 December 1985 in Negeri Sembilan, Malaysia) is a former Olympic and national record holding breaststroke swimmer from Malaysia. She swam for Malaysia at the 2000, 2004 and 2008 Olympics. She did not swim at the 2012 Olympics, and retired in 2013.

She attended university and swam for the University of Wisconsin for two years, and then the University of Arkansas (2008-2010), both in the USA.

She was named the female Malaysian Olympian of the Year in 2008.
