= Joscelin Yeo =

Singaporean swimmer

Personal information
- Full name: Joscelin Yeo Wei Ling
- National team: Singapore
- Born: 2 May 1979 (age 47) Singapore

Sport
- Sport: Swimming
Medal record
Asian Games
Bronze medal – third place	Hiroshima 1994	100 m butterfly
Bronze medal – third place	Busan 2002	100 m butterfly
Southeast Asian Games
Gold medal – first place	Singapore 1993	50 m freestyle
Gold medal – first place	Singapore 1993	100 m freestyle
Gold medal – first place	Singapore 1993	200 m freestyle
Gold medal – first place	Singapore 1993	100 m breaststroke
Gold medal – first place	Singapore 1993	200 m breaststroke
Gold medal – first place	Singapore 1993	100 m butterfly
Gold medal – first place	Singapore 1993	200 m individual medley
Gold medal – first place	Singapore 1993	4×100 m freestyle relay
Gold medal – first place	Singapore 1993	4×100 m medley relay
Gold medal – first place	Chiangmai 1995	50 m freestyle
Gold medal – first place	Chiangmai 1995	100 m freestyle
Gold medal – first place	Chiangmai 1995	200 m freestyle
Gold medal – first place	Chiangmai 1995	400 m freestyle
Gold medal – first place	Chiangmai 1995	100 m breaststroke
Gold medal – first place	Chiangmai 1995	100 m butterfly
Gold medal – first place	Chiangmai 1995	200 m individual medley
Gold medal – first place	Jakarta 1997	50 m freestyle
Gold medal – first place	Jakarta 1997	100 m freestyle
Gold medal – first place	Jakarta 1997	200 m individual medley
Gold medal – first place	Brunei 1999	50 m freestyle
Gold medal – first place	Brunei 1999	100 m freestyle
Gold medal – first place	Brunei 1999	100 m breaststroke
Gold medal – first place	Brunei 1999	100 m butterfly
Gold medal – first place	Brunei 1999	200 m individual medley
Gold medal – first place	Brunei 1999	400 m individual medley
Gold medal – first place	Kuala Lumpur 2001	100 m freestyle
Gold medal – first place	Kuala Lumpur 2001	100 m butterfly
Gold medal – first place	Kuala Lumpur 2001	200 m individual medley
Gold medal – first place	Vietnam 2003	50 m freestyle
Gold medal – first place	Vietnam 2003	100 m freestyle
Gold medal – first place	Vietnam 2003	100 m butterfly
Gold medal – first place	Vietnam 2003	200 m individual medley
Gold medal – first place	Vietnam 2003	4×100 m freestyle relay
Gold medal – first place	Vietnam 2003	4×100 m medley relay
Gold medal – first place	Manila 2005	50 m freestyle
Gold medal – first place	Manila 2005	100 m freestyle
Gold medal – first place	Manila 2005	100 m butterfly
Gold medal – first place	Manila 2005	100 m breaststroke
Gold medal – first place	Manila 2005	200 m individual medley
Gold medal – first place	Manila 2005	4×100 m medley relay
Silver medal – second place	Singapore 1993	400 m individual medley
Silver medal – second place	Chiangmai 1995	4×100 m freestyle relay
Silver medal – second place	Chiangmai 1995	4×100 m medley relay
Silver medal – second place	Jakarta 1997	4×100 m freestyle relay
Silver medal – second place	Brunei 1999	4×100 m freestyle relay
Silver medal – second place	Brunei 1999	4×200 m freestyle relay
Silver medal – second place	Kuala Lumpur 2001	50 m freestyle
Silver medal – second place	Kuala Lumpur 2001	4×100 m freestyle relay
Silver medal – second place	Kuala Lumpur 2001	4×200 m freestyle relay
Silver medal – second place	Kuala Lumpur 2001	4×100 m medley relay
Silver medal – second place	Manila 2005	4×100 m freestyle relay
Silver medal – second place	Manila 2005	4×200 m freestyle relay
Bronze medal – third place	Jakarta 1997	100 m breaststroke
Bronze medal – third place	Jakarta 1997	4×100 m medley relay
Bronze medal – third place	Jakarta 1997	4×200 m freestyle relay

Joscelin Yeo Wei Ling (Chinese: 杨玮玲; pinyin: Yáng Wěilíng; born 2 May 1979) is a former Nominated Member of Parliament (NMP) from Nov 2006 to Apr 2011 and a former competitive swimmer from Singapore. Yeo won 40 gold medals at the Southeast Asian Games. She also represented Singapore in the Asian Games, Commonwealth Games and Summer Olympics. Yeo was elected as a Rhodes Scholar, but never took up the scholarship. During the 2012 Summer Olympics, she was a TV analyst for english-speaking Asian countries on ESPN Star.

Yeo began her international swimming career at age 11, in a Asia-Pacific swim meet in Jakarta, Indonesia. She swam at almost every major international meet, including the Southeast Asian Games (8 times), the Asian Games (4), the Olympics (4), and the Commonwealth Games (3). She ended her 16-year swimming career in early 2007.

== Education ==
Yeo studied at Methodist Girls' School and at University of Texas at Austin, where she competed in track and field and swimming for the Texas Longhorns.

== Swimming career ==
Yeo started competitive swimming at the age of 11 at the Asia-Pacific swim meet held in Jakarta, Indonesia in 1990. She won six individual golds, one relay gold and silver during the meet and set six individual records and two relay records.

=== Olympics ===
Yeo swam for Singapore at four consecutive Olympics (1992, 1996, 2000 and 2004).

=== Asian Games ===
Yeo competed in four Asian Games (1994, 1998, 2002 and 2006). In the 1994 Games and the 2002 Games, she won bronze medals in the 100 Butterfly and was the only Singapore swimmer to win a medal at both Games. The 2006 Games was her last international competition.

=== Southeast Asian Games ===
Yeo swam at eight SEA Games (1991-2003), and currently hold the record of the most gold medals in SEA Games history with 40 gold medals, surpassing fellow Singaporean swimmer Patricia Chan's record of 39 gold medals.

In 1991, Yeo made her SEA Games debut in Manila as a 12-year-old. She won several silvers and bronzes.

In 1993, with the Games held in Singapore, Yeo won nine gold medals, which included 7 individual and 2 relay races. At the Games, she lost only one race: the 400 IM to compatriot Ooi Yufen May.

In 1995, in Chiangmai, Yeo also won the same seven individual races as in 1993, but lost out on the two relays. She was also the only gold medallist in the Singapore swimming squad.

In the 1997 SEA Games, Yeo won three gold medals.

In the 1999 Games, Yeo won six gold medals, all in Games Records. She was slated for 12 events, but pulled out of the fourth day of competition, due to a right shoulder injury. The only individual race she lost was the 400 Free, where she managed a bronze, finishing behind Pilin Tachakittiranan of Thailand and compatriot Bouvron Mei-Yen Christel.

In 2001, Yeo took part in lesser events as compared to previous SEA games. Yeo won three gold medals.

In 2003, Yeo won six gold medals, inclusive of two relay golds. This helped the Singapore women's swim team to clinch their first relay success since 1993.

In 2005, Yeo participated in her last SEA Games in Manila, the same city where she debuted for SEA Games. Yeo won six golds. In the 100 Butterfly, Yeo also finally finished in under one minute, winning the race in 59.91s.

=== World record ===
Yeo and her University of California, Berkeley teammates Haley Cope, Staciana Stitts and Praphalsai Minpraphal broke the 4x50 Medley Relay (Short-course) World record in 2000 with a time of 1:49.23.

=== Retirement ===
Yeo originally wanted to call it a day after the 2005 SEA Games. But after a splendid performance, she decided to continue till the 2008 Beijing Olympics. This decision saw her swim at the 2006 Melbourne Commonwealth Games and the 2006 Asian Games. On 30 January 2007, Yeo announced her retirement at a press conference saying she did not have the motivation to go on with another year of training till Beijing, and retired at 28.

=== National records ===
- 200 m individual medley - 2:16.86, 23 May 2004, 2004 Santa Clara International Swim Meet

== Post-swimming career ==
Yeo opened a swim school, called Yeo's Aquatics, along with her elder brother Leonard. She is also actively involved in church work, working as a mentor within the Youth ministry of New Creation Church.

In 2009, Yeo became a non-elected Nominated Member of Parliament for a term of two-and-a-half years, the youngest of her batch.

She made a cameo appearance in Singapore's MediaCorp TV Channel 5 Phua Chu Kang Pte Ltd playing herself, in the eighth season of the show, where the main character challenges her and fails.

On 7 June 2009, Yeo with Canagasabai Kunalan were unveiled as the two deputy mayors of the Youth Olympic Village for the 2010 Summer Youth Olympics held in Singapore.

== Accolades ==
Yeo was awarded Singapore's Sportsgirl of the Year award in 1994, and the Sportswoman of the Year awards in 1993, 1995 and 1999. She was prevented from winning any more due to a rule that stopped athletes from winning more than three times. This rule has since been lifted.

== Autobiography ==
In 2004, before the 2004 Olympics, Yeo released her autobiography, titled On the Move: My Career, My Life, which chronicled all the milestones in her life and swimming career, and also nuggets she shared about her national teammates.

== Personal life ==
Yeo is married to Joseph Christopher Purcell, born 1983, a pastor of New Creation Church in Singapore, on 9 July 2010 in HortPark. Both are actively involved in the youth ministry of New Creation.

Yeo and Purcell have 3 boys.
