= Tomoko Nagai =

Japanese swimmer (born 1981)

Personal information
- Born: 10 May 1981 (age 45) Tokushima Prefecture, Japan
- Education: University of Tsukuba
- Height: 1.66 m (5 ft 5 in)
- Weight: 55 kg (121 lb)

Sport
- Sport: Swimming
- Club: OKSS
Medal record
Representing Japan
World Championships
Bronze medal – third place	2001 Fukuoka	4×200 m freestyle
Pan Pacific Championships
Bronze medal – third place	2002 Yokohama	4×100 m freestyle
Bronze medal – third place	2002 Yokohama	4×200 m freestyle

Tomoko Nagai (永井 奉子, Nagai Tomoko; born May 5, 1981) is a Japanese swimmer who won a bronze medal in the 4 × 200 m freestyle relay at the 2001 World Aquatics Championships. Her team finished in fifth place, but the Australian and US squads were disqualified. She also competed in three events at the 2004 Summer Olympics. Her best achievement was fifth place in the 4 × 100 m medley relay.
