= Pilin Tachakittiranan =

Thai swimmer (born 1983)

Personal information
- Full name: Pilin Tachakittiranan
- National team: Thailand
- Born: 14 June 1983 (age 43) Bangkok, Thailand
- Height: 1.74 m (5 ft 9 in)
- Weight: 60 kg (132 lb)

Sport
- Sport: Swimming
- Strokes: Freestyle, butterfly
Medal record
Women's swimming
Representing Thailand
Southeast Asian Games
Gold medal – first place	2003 Hanoi	200 m freestyle
Gold medal – first place	2003 Hanoi	400 m freestyle
Gold medal – first place	2003 Hanoi	800 m freestyle
Gold medal – first place	2005 Manila	400 m freestyle
Gold medal – first place	2005 Manila	4×200 m freestyle
Bronze medal – third place	2003 Hanoi	200 m butterfly

Pilin Tachakittiranan (Thai: ไพลิน เตชะกฤตธีระนันท์; born June 14, 1983) is a Thai former swimmer, who specialized in freestyle and butterfly events. She is a two-time Olympian (2000 and 2004) and a multiple-time age-group record holder in all freestyle distances (except 1500 m). Regarded as Thailand's top female swimmer, she has won a total of five gold medals at the Southeast Asian Games (2003 and 2005).

Tachakittiranan made her first Thai team, as a 17-year-old teen, at the 2000 Summer Olympics in Sydney. There, she failed to advance into the succeeding round in any of her individual events, finishing forty-fifth in the 50 m freestyle (27.31), thirtieth in the 200 m freestyle (2:05.88), and thirty-ninth each in the 100 m freestyle (58.69) and 400 m freestyle (4:29.28).

At the 2003 Southeast Asian Games in Hanoi, Vietnam, Tachakittiranan dominated the pool for Thailand by claiming a total of three gold medals in the 200, 400, and 800 m freestyle.

At the 2004 Summer Olympics in Athens, Tachakittiranan shortened her swimming program, focusing only on the 200 and 400 m freestyle. She posted FINA B-standard entry times of 2:06.19 (200 m freestyle) and 4:21.67 (400 m freestyle) from the SEA Games. On the second day of the Games, Tachakittiranan placed thirty-fourth overall in the 400 m freestyle. Swimming in heat one, she picked up a third seed by nearly two seconds behind winner Paola Duguet of Colombia in 4:23.62. In her second event, 200 m freestyle, Tachakittiranan ended her Olympic run with a thirty-fifth-place effort from the preliminaries. She posted a lifetime best of 2:05.29 to lead the first heat against Chinese Taipei's Yang Chin-Kuei and Kazakhstan's Yuliya Rissik.
