= Malaysia at the 2001 SEA Games =

Malaysia at the 2001 Southeast Asian Games
- IOC code: MAS
- NOC: Olympic Council of Malaysia
- Website: www.olympic.org.my (in English)

in Kuala Lumpur
- Competitors: 789 in 32 sports
- Medals Ranked 1st: Gold 111 Silver 75 Bronze 85 Total 271

Southeast Asian Games appearances (overview)
- 1959; 1961; 1965; 1967; 1969; 1971; 1973; 1975; 1977; 1979; 1981; 1983; 1985; 1987; 1989; 1991; 1993; 1995; 1997; 1999; 2001; 2003; 2005; 2007; 2009; 2011; 2013; 2015; 2017; 2019; 2021; 2023; 2025; 2027; 2029

Malaysia competed in the 2001 Southeast Asian Games as the host nation in Kuala Lumpur from 8 to 17 September 2001.

The host Malaysia performance was their best ever yet in Southeast Asian Games history and emerged as overall champion of the games.

== Medal summary ==
=== Medals by sport ===
Sport	Gold	Silver	Bronze	Total	Rank
Archery	0	2	0	2	
Aquatics	19	8	11	38	
Athletics	8	5	9	22	
Badminton	2	1	7	10	
Basketball	1	0	1	2	
Billiards and snooker	0	2	1	3	
Bowling	7	4	5	16	
Boxing	2	4	3	9	
Cycling	3	8	4	15	
Diving	8	3	1	12	
Equestrian	5	4	1	10	1
Field hockey	2	0	0	2	
Football	0	1	0	1	
Golf	1	1	0	2	
Gymnastics	16	8	3	27	
Judo	0	0	1	1	
Karate	9	3	6	18	1
Lawn bowls	5	1	0	6	
Netball	1	0	0	1	
Pencak silat	5	1	4	10	
Pétanque	0	1	1	2	
Sailing	5	3	1	8	
Sepak takraw	0	1	1	2	
Shooting	6	8	7	21	
Squash	4	2	0	6	1
Swimming	9	4	10		
Synchronized swimming	2	0	0	2	
Table tennis	0	0	3	3	5
Taekwondo	3	2	4	9	
Tennis	0	1	4	5	
Volleyball	0	1	0	1	
Water polo	0	1	0	1	
Weightlifting	1	1	3	5	
Wushu	6	2	5	13	
Total	111	75	85	271	1

=== Medallists ===
The following Malaysian competitors won medals at the games; all dates are for September 2001.

Medal	Name	Sport	Event	Date
Gold	Arumugam Munusamy	Athletics	Men's 1500 metres	14 Sept
Gold	Nur Herman Majid	Athletics	Men's 110 metres hurdles	13 Sept
Gold	Teoh Boon Lim	Athletics	Men's 20 kilometres walk	12 Sept
Gold	Govindasamy Saravanan	Athletics	Men's 50 kilometres walk	15 Sept
Gold	Loo Kum Zee	Athletics	Men's high jump	14 Sept
Gold	Teh Weng Chang	Athletics	Men's pole vault	12 Sept
Gold	Wong Tee Kue	Athletics	Men's hammer throw	14 Sept
Gold	Yuan Yufang	Athletics	Women's 20 kilometres walk	13 Sept
Gold	Roslin Hashim	Badminton	Men's singles	15 Sept
Gold	Malaysia national badminton team: Chan Chong Ming; Chew Choon Eng; Choong Tan Fook; Lee Wan Wah; Ong Ewe Hock; Roslin Hashim; Wong Choong Hann	Badminton	Men's team	11 Sept
Gold	Malaysia national basketball team	Basketball	Women's tournament	16 Sept
Gold	Ben Heng	Bowling	Men's singles	10 Sept
Gold	Alex Liew; Ben Heng	Bowling	Men's doubles	11 Sept
Gold	Shalin Zulkifli	Bowling	Women's singles	10 Sept
Gold	Lai Kin Ngoh; Sarah Yap; Shalin Zulkifli	Bowling	Women's trios	12 Sept
Gold	Lai Kin Ngoh; Sarah Yap; Shalin Zulkifli; Sharon Chai; Wendy Chai De Choo	Bowling	Women's team of five	13 Sept
Gold	Shalin Zulkifli	Bowling	Women's all-events	13 Sept
Gold	Lai Kin Ngoh	Bowling	Women's masters	15 Sept
Gold	Adnan Yusoh	Boxing	Men's lightweight (60 kg)	16 Sept
Gold	Mohamad Zainudin Sidi	Boxing	Men's light welterweight (63.5 kg)	16 Sept
Gold	Josiah Ng Onn Lam	Cycling	Men's 1000 metre time trial	10 Sept
Gold	Josiah Ng Onn Lam	Cycling	Men's keirin	11 Sept
Gold	Mohd Azlan Jamaludin	Cycling	Men's individual road race massed start	16 Sept
Gold	Yeoh Ken Nee	Diving	Men's 3 metre springboard	15 Sept
Gold	Mohd Azheem Bahari	Diving	Men's 10 metre platform	14 Sept
Gold	Rossharisham Roslan; Yeoh Ken Nee	Diving	Men's synchronised 3 metre springboard	17 Sept
Gold	Mohd Azheem Bahari; Yeoh Ken Nee	Diving	Men's synchronised 10 metre platform	16 Sept
Gold	Leong Mun Yee	Diving	Women's 3 metre springboard	14 Sept
Gold	Leong Mun Yee	Diving	Women's 10 metre platform	15 Sept
Gold	Leong Mun Yee; Rosatimah Muhammad	Diving	Women's synchronised 3 metre springboard	16 Sept
Gold	Leong Mun Yee; Rosatimah Muhammad	Diving	Women's synchronised 10 metre platform	17 Sept
Gold	Abdul Salim Fazlay Rahman; Nur Quzandria Mahamad Fathil; Putri Alia Soraya Ahmad Shuhaimi; Qabil Ambak Mahamad Fathil	Equestrian	Team dressage	10 Sept
Gold	Qabil Ambak Mahamad Fathil	Equestrian	Individual dressage	12 Sept
Gold	Kamaruddin Abdul Ghani	Equestrian	Individual endurance	8 Sept
Gold	Azni Azar; Eric Koh; Qabil Ambak Mahamad Fathil; Quzier Ambak Mahamad Fathil	Equestrian	Team showjumping	11 Sept
Gold	Qabil Ambak Mahamad Fathil	Equestrian	Individual showjumping	14 Sept
Gold	Malaysia men's national field hockey team: Chairil Anwar Abdul Aziz; Kuhan Shanmuganathan; Suhaimi Ibrahim	Field hockey	Men's tournament	16 Sept
Gold	Malaysia women's national field hockey team: Ernawati Mahmood; Rosmimi Jamalani	Field hockey	Women's tournament	15 Sept
Gold		Golf	Men's team	16 Sept
Gold	Heng Wah Jing; Mohd Irwan Miskob; Loke Yik Siang; Ng Shu Wai; Onn Kwang Tung; Ooi Wei Siang	Gymnastics	Men's artistic team all-around	8 Sept
Gold	Loke Yik Siang	Gymnastics	Men's vault	12 Sept
Gold	Mohd Irwan Miskob	Gymnastics	Men's parallel bar	12 Sept
Gold	Ng Shu Wai	Gymnastics	Men's floor	12 Sept
Gold	Alexina Au Li Yen; Chang Siew Ting; Chang Zhi Wei; Nurul Fatiha Abdul Hamid; Yap Yee Yin	Gymnastics	Women's artistic team all-around	9 Sept
Gold	Nurul Fatiha Abdul Hamid	Gymnastics	Women's artistic individual all-around	10 Sept
Gold	Alexina Au Li Yen	Gymnastics	Women's vault	12 Sept
Gold	Chang Zhi Wei	Gymnastics	Women's balance beam	12 Sept
Gold	Chang Zhi Wei	Gymnastics	Women's uneven bars	12 Sept
Gold	Nurul Fatiha Abdul Hamid	Gymnastics	Women's floor	12 Sept
Gold	Celestie Chan; Goh Yi Wei; Sarina Sundara Rajah	Gymnastics	Women's rhythmic team all-around	14 Sept
Gold	Celestie Chan	Gymnastics	Women's rhythmic ball	16 Sept
Gold	Celestie Chan	Gymnastics	Women's rhythmic rope	16 Sept
Gold	Goh Yi Wei	Gymnastics	Women's rhythmic clubs	16 Sept
Gold	Goh Yi Wei	Gymnastics	Women's rhythmic hoop	16 Sept
Gold	Goh Yi Wei	Gymnastics	Women's rhythmic individual all-around	15 Sept
Gold	Ku Jin Keat	Karate	Men's individual kata	9 Sept
Gold	James Ch'ng Ewe Teng; Ku Jin Keat; Yeoh Swee King	Karate	Men's team kata	10 Sept
Gold	Puvaneswaran Ramasamy	Karate	Men's individual kumite 58 kg	9 Sept
Gold	Rayner Kinsiong	Karate	Men's individual kumite 75 kg	9 Sept
Gold	P. Thiagu	Karate	Men's individual kumite 80 kg	11 Sept
Gold	Lim Lee Lee	Karate	Women's individual kata	9 Sept
Gold	Jaclyn Ch'ng Ching; Lim Lee Lee; Thoe Ai Poh	Karate	Women's team kata	10 Sept
Gold		Karate	Women's team kumite	
Gold	M. Srirajarajeswari	Karate	Women's individual kumite 53 kg	10 Sept
Gold	S. Premila	Karate	Women's individual kumite 60 kg	10 Sept
Gold	Syed Mohamad Syed Akil	Lawn bowls	Men's singles	16 Sept
Gold	Mohamed Tazman Tahir; Sazeli Sani	Lawn bowls	Men's pairs	16 Sept
Gold	Aziz Maswadi; Mohd Aidf Daud; Ibrahim Jusoh; Shalhuddin Wahab	Lawn bowls	Men's team of four	15 Sept
Gold	Nor Hashimah Ismail; Sarimah Abu Bakar	Lawn bowls	Women's pairs	16 Sept
Gold	Nazura Ngahat; Rosnah Abu; Haslah Hassan; Bah Chu Mei	Lawn bowls	Women's team of four	15 Sept
Gold		Netball	Women's tournament	14 Sept
Gold	Noor Syahidda Wati Abdullah Sani; Shalina Abdul Ghafar	Pencak silat	Women's doubles	14 Sept
Gold	Ismail Darus	Pencak silat	Men's Class A (45-50 kg)	16 Sept
Gold	Mohd Azrin Abd Malek	Pencak silat	Men's Class I (85-90 kg)	16 Sept
Gold	Ahmad Faizal Omar	Pencak silat	Men's Class J (90-95 kg)	16 Sept
Gold	Mastura Sapuan	Pencak silat	Women's Class E (65-70 kg)	16 Sept
Gold	Abdul Rahim Mohd Zan	Sailing	Optimist	15 Sept
Gold		Sailing	Team Optimist	11 Sept
Gold	Hasikin Abdul Hamid; Patricia Kelly Yin Li Lean	Sailing	International 470	15 Sept
Gold	Kelvin Lim Leong Keat	Sailing	Laser	15 Sept
Gold	Tiffany Koo Yee Chin	Sailing	Laser radial	15 Sept
Gold	Hasli Izwan Amir Hasan	Shooting	Men's individual rapid fire pistol	12 Sept
Gold	Bibiana Ng Pei Chin	Shooting	Women's individual sports pistol	10 Sept
Gold	Bibiana Ng Pei Chin; Irina Maharani; Suefarinawathy Affendi	Shooting	Women's team sports pistol	10 Sept
Gold	Bibiana Ng Pei Chin; Irina Maharani; Suefarinawathy Affendi	Shooting	Women's team air pistol	9 Sept
Gold	Irina Maharani	Shooting	Women's individual air pistol	9 Sept
Gold	Nur Suryani Taibi; Nurul Hudda Baharin; Roslina Bakar	Shooting	Women's team rifle prone three positions	11 Sept
Gold	Mohd Azlan Iskandar	Squash	Men's singles	12 Sept
Gold	Nicol David	Squash	Women's singles	12 Sept
Gold	Kenneth Low; Mohd Azlan Iskandar; Yap Kok Four	Squash	Men's team	15 Sept
Gold	Nicol David; Sharon Wee; Tricia Chuah	Squash	Women's team	15 Sept
Gold	Alex Lim Keng Liat	Swimming	Men's 100 metre backstroke	11 Sept
Gold	Alex Lim Keng Liat	Swimming	Men's 200 metre backstroke	9 Sept
Gold	Elvin Chia Tshun Thau	Swimming	Men's 100 metre breaststroke	10 Sept
Gold	Elvin Chia Tshun Thau	Swimming	Men's 200 metre breaststroke	12 Sept
Gold	Anthony Ang Kang Keam	Swimming	Men's 100 metre butterfly	11 Sept
Gold	Anthony Ang Kang Keam	Swimming	Men's 200 metre butterfly	13 Sept
Gold	Alex Lim Keng Liat; Allen Ong Hou Ming; Anthony Ang Kang Keam; Elvin Chia Tshun Thau	Swimming	Men's 4 × 100 metre medley relay	13 Sept
Gold	Siow Yi Ting	Swimming	Women's 200 metre breaststroke	12 Sept
Gold	Sia Wai Yen	Swimming	Women's 400 metre individual medley	13 Sept
Gold	Suzanna Ghazali Bujang	Synchronized swimming	Women's free and technical routine solo	16 Sept
Gold	Suzanna Ghazali Bujang; Sara Kamil-Yusof	Synchronized swimming	Women's free and technical routine duet	17 Sept
Gold	S. Saravanan	Taekwondo	Men's featherweight (62-67 kg)	9 Sept
Gold	Elaine Teo Shueh Fhren	Taekwondo	Women's bantamweight (51-55 kg)	9 Sept
Gold	Chew Chee Chan	Taekwondo	Women's heavyweight (+72 kg)	11 Sept
Gold	Edmund Yeo Thien Chuan	Weightlifting	Men's 94 kg	13 Sept
Gold	Lim Kim	Wushu	Men's daoshu	9 Sept
Gold	Oh Poh Soon	Wushu	Men's changquan	9 Sept
Gold	Oh Poh Soon	Wushu	Men's jianshu	9 Sept
Gold	Oh Poh Soon	Wushu	Men's qiangshu	10 Sept
Gold	Ho Ro Bin	Wushu	Men's nandao and nangun	10 Sept
Gold	Ho Ro Bin	Wushu	Men's nanquan	9 Sept
Silver	Lim Geok Pong	Archery	Women's individual recurve	13 Sept
Silver	Fairuz Hanisah Che Ibrahim; Anbarasi Subramaniam; Lim Geok Pong	Archery	Women's team recurve	15 Sept
Silver	Azmi Ibrahim	Athletics	Men's 200 metres	15 Sept
Silver	Azmi Ibrahim; Mohd Faiz Mohamed; Raman Ganeshwaran; Watson Nyambek	Athletics	Men's 4 × 100 metres relay	15 Sept
Silver	Moh Siew Wei	Athletics	Women's 110 metres hurdles	13 Sept
Silver	Noraseela Mohd Khalid	Athletics	Women's 400 metres hurdles	14 Sept
Silver	Roslinda Samsu	Athletics	Women's pole vault	15 Sept
Silver	Ang Li Peng; Lim Pek Siah	Badminton	Women's doubles	15 Sept
Silver	Ng Ann Seng	Billiards and snooker	Men's snooker singles	12 Sept
Silver		Billiards and snooker	Men's billiards doubles	10 Sept
Silver	Ben Heng; Gerald Samuel; Zulmazran Zulkifli	Bowling	Men's trios	12 Sept
Silver	Alex Liew; Ben Heng; Daniel Lim; Gerald Samuel; Zulmazran Zulkifli	Bowling	Men's team of five	13 Sept
Silver	Ben Heng	Bowling	Men's all-events	13 Sept
Silver	Zulmazran Zulkifli	Bowling	Men's all-events	13 Sept
Silver	Alex Liew	Bowling	Men's masters	15 Sept
Silver	Sapok Biki	Boxing	Men's 48 kg	16 Sept
Silver	Rakib Ahmad	Boxing	Men's 51 kg	16 Sept
Silver	Shuhairi Hussain	Boxing	Men's 67 kg	16 Sept
Silver	Zamri Mustafa	Boxing	Men's 75 kg	16 Sept
Silver	Wong Ah Tiam	Cycling	Men's individual road race massed start	16 Sept
Silver	Josiah Ng	Cycling	Men's sprint	10 Sept
Silver	Robert Lee	Cycling	Men's individual pursuit	10 Sept
Silver	Josiah Ng; Mohd Ghaffuan Ghazali; Rosman Alwi	Cycling	Men's team sprint	11 Sept
Silver	Robert Lee; Mohd Mahazir Hamad; Mohd Hardi Razali; Faizul Izuan Abdul Rahman	Cycling	Men's team pursuit	11 Sept
Silver	Halimah Mohd Janis	Cycling	Women's sprint	10 Sept
Silver	Halimah Mohd Janis	Cycling	Women's 500 metre time trial	11 Sept
Silver	Noor Azian Alias	Cycling	Women's points race	9 Sept
Silver	Yeoh Ken Nee	Diving	Men's 10 metre platform	14 Sept
Silver	Low Lap Bun; Nor Aznizal Najib	Diving	Men's synchronised 10 metre platform	16 Sept
Silver	Rosatimah Muhammad	Diving	Women's 10 metre platform	15 Sept
Silver		Equestrian	Team eventing	17 Sept
Silver	Nik Ishak Wan Abdullah	Equestrian	Individual endurance	8 Sept
Silver	Quzier Ambak Mahamad Fathil	Equestrian	Individual showjumping	14 Sept
Silver	Nur Quzandria Mahamad Fathil	Equestrian	Individual dressage	12 Sept
Silver	Malaysia national under-23 football team: Akmal Rizal Ahmad Rakhli; Hairuddin Omar; Indra Putra Mahayuddin; Irwan Fadzli Idrus; Juzaili Samion; Kamarulzaman Hassan; Mohd Nizam Jamil; Mohd Nizaruddin Yusof; Mohd Shukor Adan; Mohd Syaiful Sabtu	Football	Men's tournament	15 Sept
Silver	Airil Rizman Zahari	Golf	Men's singles	13 Sept
Silver	Ng Shu Wai	Gymnastics	Men's horizontal bar	12 Sept
Silver	Ng Shu Wai	Gymnastics	Men's parallel bar	12 Sept
Silver	Onn Kwang Tung	Gymnastics	Men's pommel horse	12 Sept
Silver	Chang Zhi Wei	Gymnastics	Women's artistic individual all-around	10 Sept
Silver	Alexina Au Li Yen	Gymnastics	Women's floor	12 Sept
Silver	Yap Yee Yin	Gymnastics	Women's vault	12 Sept
Silver	Celestie Chan	Gymnastics	Women's rhythmic clubs	16 Sept
Silver	Celestie Chan	Gymnastics	Women's rhythmic individual all-around	15 Sept
Silver	Lim Yoke Wai	Karate	Men's individual kumite 60 kg	10 Sept
Silver	Kong Tai Moon	Karate	Men's individual kumite 65 kg	10 Sept
Silver	Ng Chai Lin	Karate	Women's individual kumite 48 kg	9 Sept
Silver	Siti Zalina Ahmad	Lawn bowls	Women's singles	16 Sept
Silver	Muhammad Zainal; Marwan Mar Rus	Pencak silat	Men's doubles	14 Sept
Silver	Norazura Mohd Zain	Pétanque	Women's singles	13 Sept
Silver	Sandra Yin Lili	Sailing	Optimist	15 Sept
Silver	Nor Balqis Yaacob; Nurul Ain Md Isa	Sailing	International 420	15 Sept
Silver	Ahmad Ezzat Mohd. Zaki; Ahmad Jais Baharom; Kaharudin Shamsudin; Marzuki Ismail; Mohd. Aznan Raslan; Mohd. Firdaus Abd. Ghani; Mohd Haniff Azman; Najib Iman; Nor Hisham Abd. Ghani; Rosmadi Abd. Ghani; Suhaimi Mat Salim	Sepak takraw	Men's team	12 Sept
Silver	Mohd Emran Zakaria	Shooting	Men's individual free rifle prone	10 Sept
Silver	Mohd Emran Zakaria; Mohd Hameleay Abd Mutalib; Abdul Mutalib Abdul Razak	Shooting	Men's team air rifle	11 Sept
Silver	Mohd Emran Zakaria	Shooting	Men's individual rifle prone three positions	14 Sept
Silver	Mohd Emran Zakaria; Mohd Hameleay Abd Mutalib; Mohd Sabki Mohd Din	Shooting	Men's team rifle prone three positions	12 Sept
Silver	Kaw Fun Ying; Richard Cheong; Ricky Teh	Shooting	Men's team skeet	12 Sept
Silver	Irina Maharani	Shooting	Women's individual sports pistol	10 Sept
Silver	Nurul Hudda Baharin	Shooting	Women's individual air rifle	12 Sept
Silver	Nur Suryani Taibi; Nurul Hudda Baharin; Sarihati Awang	Shooting	Women's team air rifle	12 Sept
Silver	Kenneth Low	Squash	Men's singles	12 Sept
Silver	Sharon Wee	Squash	Women's singles	12 Sept
Silver	Allen Ong Hou Ming	Swimming	Men's 100 metre freestyle	10 Sept
Silver	Allen Ong Hou Ming	Swimming	Men's 100 metre butterfly	11 Sept
Silver	Sia Wai Yen	Swimming	Women's 800 metre freestyle	11 Sept
Silver	Siow Yi Ting	Swimming	Women's 200 metre individual medley	9 Sept
Silver	Sara Kamil-Yusof	Synchronized swimming	Women's solo	16 Sept
Silver	Shahidin Shah Mohd Farook	Taekwondo	Men's finweight	10 Sept
Silver	S. Vijendran	Taekwondo	Men's heavyweight	11 Sept
Silver	Khoo Chin Bee; Tan Lynn Yin; Liaw Chen Yee	Tennis	Women's team	11 Sept
Silver	Malaysia national volleyball team: Ong Siew Meei	Volleyball	Men's tournament	16 Sept
Silver	Malaysia national water polo team	Water polo	Men's tournament	15 Sept
Silver	Amirul Hamizan Ibrahim	Weightlifting	Men's 56 kg	11 Sept
Silver	Lim Kim	Wushu	Men's changquan	9 Sept
Silver	Lim Kim	Wushu	Men's gunshu	10 Sept
Bronze	Raman Ganeshwaran	Athletics	Men's 200 metres	15 Sept
Bronze	Romzi Bakar	Athletics	Men's 400 metres	13 Sept
Bronze	Mohd Faiz Mohamed	Athletics	Men's 110 metres hurdles	13 Sept
Bronze	Muhamad Zaiful Zainal Abidin; Romzi Bakar	Athletics	Men's 4 × 400 metres relay	15 Sept
Bronze	Balaysendaran Thirukumaran	Athletics	Men's 20 kilometres walk	12 Sept
Bronze	Mohd Sharul Amri Suhaimi	Athletics	Men's long jump	13 Sept
Bronze	Carol Lucia Alfred; Moh Siew Wei; Norashikin Abdul Rahman	Athletics	Women's 4 × 100 metres relay	15 Sept
Bronze		Athletics	Women's 4 × 400 metres relay	15 Sept
Bronze	Siti Shahida Abdullah	Athletics	Women's hammer throw	12 Sept
Bronze	Wong Miew Kheng	Badminton	Women's singles	15 Sept
Bronze	Ng Mee Fen	Badminton	Women's singles	15 Sept
Bronze	Chan Chong Ming; Chew Choon Eng	Badminton	Men's doubles	15 Sept
Bronze	Lee Wan Wah; Wong Choong Hann	Badminton	Men's doubles	15 Sept
Bronze	Norhasikin Amin; Wong Pei Tty	Badminton	Women's doubles	15 Sept
Bronze	Chew Choon Eng; Wong Pei Tty	Badminton	Mixed doubles	15 Sept
Bronze	Malaysia national badminton team: Ang Li Peng; Lim Pek Siah; Ng Mee Fen; Norhasikin Amin; Joanne Quay; Wong Miew Kheng; Wong Pei Tty	Badminton	Women's team	11 Sept
Bronze	Malaysia national basketball team	Basketball	Men's tournament	16 Sept
Bronze		Billiards and snooker	Men's snooker team	14 Sept
Bronze	Gerald Samuel; Zulmazran Zulkifli	Bowling	Men's doubles	11 Sept
Bronze	Mak Choong Yee; Sharon Chai; Wendy Chai De Choo	Bowling	Women's trios	12 Sept
Bronze	Lai Kin Ngoh	Bowling	Women's all-events	13 Sept
Bronze	Sharon Chai	Bowling	Women's masters	15 Sept
Bronze	Zamzai Azizi Mohamad	Boxing	Men's 45 kg	16 Sept
Bronze	Jaiwat Yamun	Boxing	Men's 54 kg	16 Sept
Bronze	Che Andli Che Hashim	Boxing	Men's 81 kg	16 Sept
Bronze	Mohd Ghaffuan Ghazali	Cycling	Men's 1000 metre time trial	10 Sept
Bronze	Fairuz Izni Abdul Ghani	Cycling	Men's keirin	11 Sept
Bronze	Mohd Hardi Razali; Mohd Ghaffuan Ghazali	Cycling	Men's madison	11 Sept
Bronze	Noor Azian Alias	Cycling	Women's individual pursuit	10 Sept
Bronze	Rosatimah Muhammad	Diving	Women's 3 metre springboard	14 Sept
Bronze	Husref Malik	Equestrian	Individual eventing	17 Sept
Bronze	Loke Yik Siang	Gymnastics	Men's artistic individual all-around	10 Sept
Bronze	Chang Siew Ting	Gymnastics	Women's uneven bars	12 Sept
Bronze	Sarina Sundara Rajah	Gymnastics	Women's rhythmic hoop	16 Sept
Bronze	Ku Su Yin	Judo	Men's heavyweight	13 Sept
Bronze	R. Muniandy	Karate	Men's individual kumite 70 kg	11 Sept
Bronze	A. Alexander	Karate	Men's individual kumite +80 kg	9 Sept
Bronze	Kong Tai Moon	Karate	Men's individual kumite openweight	11 Sept
Bronze		Karate	Men's team kumite	11 Sept
Bronze	Agnes Tan Sze Ching	Karate	Women's individual kumite +60 kg	9 Sept
Bronze		Karate	Women's team kumite	11 Sept
Bronze	Mohd Fajar Subhi Ahmad	Pencak silat	Men's Class E (65-70 kg)	16 Sept
Bronze	Shamsul Nizam Abdul Rahman	Pencak silat	Men's Class H (80-85 kg)	16 Sept
Bronze	Hamidah Jaafar	Pencak silat	Women's Class B (50-55 kg)	16 Sept
Bronze	Sharina Abdul Fatah	Pencak silat	Women's Class C (55-60 kg)	16 Sept
Bronze	Azura Sarbin; Noraishah Abdullah; Norhazura Kusni	Pétanque	Women's trios	15 Sept
Bronze	Amir Muizz Djamaluddin; Muhammad Fauzi Kaman Shah	Sailing	Laser II Open	15 Sept
Bronze	Jeremy Koo; Looi Sing Yew	Sailing	International 420	15 Sept
Bronze	Ahmad Ezzat Mohd. Zaki; Mohd. Aznan Raslan; Mohd. Firdaus Abd. Ghani; Suhaimi Mat Salim	Sepak takraw	Men's regu	15 Sept
Bronze	Mohd Emran Zakaria; Mohd Sabki Mohd Din; Saad Zainol Abidin	Shooting	Men's team free rifle prone	10 Sept
Bronze	Mohd Emran Zakaria	Shooting	Men's individual air rifle	11 Sept
Bronze	Baharuddin Hashim; Hasli Izwan Amir Hasan; Leong Jia Chyuan	Shooting	Men's team standing fire pistol	13 Sept
Bronze	Charles Chen Seong Fook	Shooting	Men's individual trap	9 Sept
Bronze	Charles Chen Seong Fook; Gary Goh; Leong Wei Heng	Shooting	Men's team trap	9 Sept
Bronze	Nordalilah Abu Bakar; Roslina Bakar; Sarihati Awang	Shooting	Women's team rifle prone	13 Sept
Bronze	Allen Ong Hou Ming	Swimming	Men's 50 metre freestyle	12 Sept
Bronze	Dieung Manggang	Swimming	Men's 400 metre freestyle	11 Sept
Bronze	Dieung Manggang	Swimming	Men's 1500 metre freestyle	12 Sept
Bronze	Dieung Manggang	Swimming	Men's 200 metre butterfly	13 Sept
Bronze	Sia Wai Yen	Swimming	Women's 400 metre freestyle	10 Sept
Bronze	Sia Wai Yen	Swimming	Women's 200 metre backstroke	9 Sept
Bronze	Siow Yi Ting	Swimming	Women's 100 metre breaststroke	10 Sept
Bronze	Sia Wai Yen	Swimming	Women's 200 metre individual medley	9 Sept
Bronze	Sia Wai Yen; Siow Yi Ting	Swimming	Women's 4 × 100 metre freestyle relay	10 Sept
Bronze	Sia Wai Yen; Siow Yi Ting	Swimming	Women's 4 × 200 metre freestyle relay	9 Sept
Bronze	Beh Lee Fong; Beh Lee Wei	Table tennis	Women's doubles	14 Sept
Bronze	Tan Chin; Chan Koon Wah; Jong Min Shing; Oh Chor Sime	Table tennis	Men's team	11 Sept
Bronze	Beh Lee Wei; Beh Lee Fong; Ng Sock Khim	Table tennis	Women's team	11 Sept
Bronze	Benjamin Raj	Taekwondo	Men's bantamweight	9 Sept
Bronze	Soo Lai Yin	Taekwondo	Women's featherweight	9 Sept
Bronze	Lee Show Hui	Taekwondo	Women's middleweight	10 Sept
Bronze	Lee Pei Fen	Taekwondo	Women's welterweight	11 Sept
Bronze		Tennis	Men's singles	16 Sept
Bronze		Tennis	Men's doubles	16 Sept
Bronze		Tennis	Women's singles	15 Sept
Bronze		Tennis	Mixed doubles	16 Sept
Bronze	Muhammad Hidayat Hamidon	Weightlifting	Men's 69 kg	12 Sept
Bronze	Ahmad Fazlan Ghazali	Weightlifting	Men's 77 kg	12 Sept
Bronze	Jerry Nonong	Weightlifting	Men's 105 kg	14 Sept
Bronze	Lim Yew Fai	Wushu	Men's qiangshu	10 Sept
Bronze	Lim Chee Leong	Wushu	Men's sanshou 52 kg	11 Sept
Bronze	Bernard Radun	Wushu	Men's sanshou 60 kg	11 Sept
Bronze	Tan Lih Chuan	Wushu	Men's sanshou 65 kg	11 Sept
Bronze	Wong Pei Ling	Wushu	Women's taijiquan and taijijian	11 Sept

== Football ==
=== Men's tournament ===
Group B

Team	Pld	W	D	L	GF	GA	GD	Pts
Malaysia	3	3	0	0	9	1	+8	9
Indonesia	3	2	0	1	11	2	+9	6
Vietnam	3	1	0	2	5	4	+1	3
Brunei	3	0	0	3	1	19	−18	0

2 September 2001

Malaysia	5 – 0	Brunei
Indra 38'; Rakhli 44', 45', 70'; Yusof 85' (pen.)

MBPJ Stadium, Petaling Jaya
Referee: AGC Deshapriya (Sri Lanka)

9 September 2001

Malaysia	2 – 1	Indonesia
Rakhli 69'; Irwan 81'		Maman 49'

MBPJ Stadium, Petaling Jaya
Referee: Yoshida Toshimitsu (Japan)

11 September 2001

Malaysia	2 – 0	Vietnam
Jamil 47'; Rakhli 85'

Bukit Jalil National Stadium, Kuala Lumpur
Referee: Rungklay Mongkol (Thailand)

Semifinal

13 September 2001

Malaysia	1 – 0	Myanmar
Yusof 12'

Shah Alam Stadium, Shah Alam
Referee: Yoshida Toshimitsu (Japan)

Gold medal match

15 September 2001

Malaysia	0 – 1	Thailand
		Sakda 75'

Shah Alam Stadium, Shah Alam
Referee: Lương Thế Tài (Vietnam)

=== Women's tournament ===
Group A

Team	Pld	W	D	L	GF	GA	GD	Pts
Thailand	3	2	1	0	7	2	+5	7
Myanmar	3	2	1	0	7	2	+5	7
Malaysia	3	1	0	2	3	7	−4	3
Philippines	3	0	0	3	0	6	−6	0

4 September 2001

Myanmar	5 – 1	Malaysia
Mar Lin Win 13', 33', 57'; Zin Mar Win 72'; Nu Nu Khaine Win 86'		Nor Aishah Ishak 84'

6 September 2001

Thailand	2 – 1	Malaysia
Ngamsom Chaiyawut 27', 90'		Widiya Habibah 86'

10 September 2001

Malaysia	1 – 0	Philippines
Rozana Roslan 30'
