= Philippines at the 2001 SEA Games =

Philippines at the 2001 Southeast Asian Games
- IOC code: PHI
- NOC: Philippine Olympic Committee
- Website: www.olympic.ph (in English)

in Kuala Lumpur
- Medals Ranked 5th: Gold 30 Silver 66 Bronze 67 Total 163

Southeast Asian Games appearances (overview)
- 1977; 1979; 1981; 1983; 1985; 1987; 1989; 1991; 1993; 1995; 1997; 1999; 2001; 2003; 2005; 2007; 2009; 2011; 2013; 2015; 2017; 2019; 2021; 2023; 2025; 2027; 2029

The Philippines participated in the 21st Southeast Asian Games held in Kuala Lumpur, Malaysia from 8 to 17 September 2001.

== SEA Games performance ==
The Philippines' 30-gold medal harvest was nine better than what it got in the 1999 edition in Brunei. Despite the country's fifth-place finish, Philippine Olympic Committee president Celso Dayrit praised the Filipino athletes. The nationals saw action in 29 events.

== Medalists ==
=== Gold ===
No.	Medal	Name	Sport	Event
1	Gold	Purita Joy Marino	Archery	Women's individual
2	Gold	Ernie Candelario	Athletics	Men's 400m
3	Gold	John Lozada	Athletics	Men's 800m
4	Gold	Eduardo Buenavista	Athletics	Men's 5000m
5	Gold	Eduardo Buenavista	Athletics	Men's 3000m Steeplechase
6	Gold	Roy Vence	Athletics	Men's Marathon
7	Gold	Fidel Gallenero	Athletics	Men's Decathlon
8	Gold	Cristabel Martes	Athletics	Women's Marathon
9	Gold	Elma Muros	Athletics	Women's Heptathlon
10	Gold	Philippines	Basketball	Men's team
	Gold	Lee Van Corteza	Billiards	Men's Pool 8-Ball Singles
	Gold	Antonio Lining	Billiards	Men's Pool 9-Ball Singles
	Gold	Warren Kiamco	Billiards	Men's Rotation 15-Ball Singles
	Gold	Arrianne Valdez Liza del Rosario	Bowling	Women’s Doubles
11	Gold	Walbert Mendoza	Fencing	Men's individual Sabre
12	Gold	Juvic Pagunsan	Golf	Men's individual
13	Gold	John Baylon	Judo	Men's Half Middleweight -81kg
14	Gold	Jose Marie Pabillore	Karate	Men's kumite +80kg
15	Gold	Gretchen Malalad	Karate	Women's kumite +60kg
16	Gold	Roberto Cruz	Taekwondo	Men's finweight -54kg
17	Gold	Veronica Domingo	Taekwondo	Women's Lightweight -63kg
18	Gold	Ma. Nelia Sy Ycasas	Taekwondo	Women's welterweight -67kg
19	Gold	Willy Wang	Wushu	Men's taolu qiangshu
20	Gold	Mark Robert Rosales	Wushu	Men's taolu Gunshu
21	Gold	Jerome Calica	Wushu	Men's sanda Sanshou 52kg
22	Gold	Sangio Marques	Wushu	Men's sanda Sanshou 60kg

=== Silver ===
No.	Medal	Name	Sport	Event
1	Silver	John Lozada	Athletics	Men's 1500m
2	Silver	Daud Mama	Athletics	Men's 3000m Steeplechase
3	Silver	Philippines	Athletics	Men's 4 × 400 m Relay
4	Silver	Allan Ballester	Athletics	Men's Marathon
5	Silver	Sean Guevarra	Athletics	Men's high jump
6	Silver	Joebert Delicano	Athletics	Men's long jump
7	Silver	Dandy Gallenero	Athletics	Men's javelin throw
8	Silver	Narcisa Atienza	Athletics	Women's high jump
9	Silver	Lerma Bulauitan	Athletics	Women's long jump
10	Silver	Geralyn Amandoron	Athletics	Women's javelin throw
11	Silver	Parcela Molina	Athletics	Women's Heptathlon
12	Silver	Arlan Lerio	Boxing	Men's Bantamweight 51-54kg
13	Silver	Ramil Zambales	Boxing	Men's Featherweight 54-57kg
14	Silver	Sheila Mae Perez	Diving	Women's 3m springboard
15	Silver	Edmong Velez	Fencing	Men's individual Sabre
15	Silver	Richard Gomez	Fencing	Men's individual Épée
16	Silver	Lenita Reyes	Fencing	Women's individual Foil
17	Silver	Lorena Ann San Diego	Fencing	Women's individual Épée
18	Silver	Roel Ramirez	Gymnastics	Men's floor Exercise
19	Silver	Pia Adelle Reyes	Gymnastics	Balance Beam
20	Silver	Abraham Pulia	Judo	Men's Extra-Lightweight -60kg
21	Silver	Lucero Aristoti	Judo	Men's Half Lightweight -66kg
22	Silver	Nancy Quillotes	Judo	Men's Extra-Lightweight -48kg
23	Silver	Junel Perania	Karate	Men's kumite 70kg
24	Silver	Benjamin Tolentino Jr.	Rowing	Men's single sculls
25	Silver	Nestor Cordova; Harvey Vargas Regalado	Rowing	Men's Coxless Pair
26	Silver	Edgardo Macabitas Mayrina; Mark Anthony Galvez; Alvin Amposta; Jose Turingan Rodriguez	Rowing	Men's lightweight coxless four
27	Silver	Miguel Mendoza	Swimming	Men's 400m freestyle
28	Silver	Miguel Mendoza	Swimming	Men's 1500m freestyle
29	Silver	Miguel Molina	Swimming	Men's 200m individual medley
30	Silver	Carlo Piccio	Swimming	Men's 400m individual medley
31	Silver	Lizza Danila	Swimming	Women's 100m backstroke
32	Silver	Lizza Danila	Swimming	Women's 200m backstroke
33	Silver	Jenny Guerrero	Swimming	Women's 100m breaststroke
34	Silver	Donald Geisler	Taekwondo	Men's Lightweight -72kg
35	Silver	Eva Marie Ditam	Taekwondo	Women's finweight -47kg
36	Silver	Kalindi Tamayo	Taekwondo	Women's Featherweight -59kg
37	Silver	Sally Solis	Taekwondo	Women's welterweight -72kg
38	Silver	Margarita Bonifacio	Taekwondo	Women's Heavyweight +72kg
39	Silver	Rexel Nganhayna	Wushu	Men's sanda Sanshou 56kg
40	Silver	Lily So	Wushu	Women's taolu Nanquan

=== Bronze ===
No.	Medal	Name	Sport	Event
1	Bronze	Joebert Delicano	Athletics	Men's triple jump
2	Bronze	Arniel Ferrera	Athletics	Men's hammer throw
3	Bronze	Robert Fresnido	Athletics	Men's Decathlon
4	Bronze	Lerma Bulauitan	Athletics	Women's 100m
5	Bronze	Philippines	Basketball	Women's team
6	Bronze	Violito Payla	Boxing	Men's Flyweight 48-51kg
7	Bronze	Larry Semillano	Boxing	Men's Lightweight 57-60kg
8	Bronze	Romeo Brin	Boxing	Men's Light Welterweight 60-64kg
9	Bronze	Reynaldo Galido	Boxing	Men's welterweight 64-67kg
10	Bronze	Maximino Tabangcora	Boxing	Men's Middleweight 71-75kg
11	Bronze	Zardo Domenios	Diving	Men's 3m springboard
12	Bronze	Zardo Domenios; Jaime Asok	Diving	Men's Synchronized 3m springboard
13	Bronze	Rolando Canlas	Fencing	Men's individual Foil
14	Bronze	Juvic Pagunsan; Jay Bayron; Marvin Dumandan; Jesselito Saragoza	Golf	Men's team
15	Bronze	Heidi Chua; Carmelette Villaroman; Maria Ruby Chico	Golf	Women's team
16	Bronze	Pia Adelle Reyes; Precious Aissa Reyes; Phoebe Danielle Espiritu; Anna Francesca Cruz; Aianna Difuntorium	Gymnastics	Women's All-Around
17	Bronze	Precious Aissa Reyes	Gymnastics	Balance Beam
18	Bronze	Pia Adelle Reyes	Gymnastics	Women's floor Exercise
19	Bronze	Maria Angelica Basco	Gymnastics	Rhythmic Ball
20	Bronze	Sydney Schwarzkoff	Judo	Men's Middleweight -90kg
21	Bronze	Rolando Dino	Judo	Men's Half Heavyweight -100kg
22	Bronze	Elmarie Malasan	Judo	Women's Lightweight -57kg
23	Bronze	Karen Solomon	Judo	Women's Middleweight -70kg
24	Bronze	Marie Ano Aiza	Judo	Women's Half Heavyweight -78kg
25	Bronze	Ryan Bonifacio FM	Karate	Men's kumite 75kg
26	Bronze	Philippines	Karate	Men's team kumite
27	Bronze	Maria Marna Pabillore	Karate	Women's kumite 48kg
28	Bronze	Maricar Rimando	Karate	Women's kumite 53kg
29	Bronze	Philippines	Karate	Women's team kumite
30	Bronze	Edgardo Macabitas Mayrina; Jose Turingan Rodriguez	Rowing	Men's lightweight double sculls
31	Bronze	Myla Tanada Babilonia; Josalyn Permejo Tolentino	Rowing	Women's lightweight coxless four
32	Bronze	Edgar Ballebar; Arnel Begornia; Ricky Espinola; Joboy Antipala	Squash	Men's team
33	Bronze	Philippines	Swimming	Men's 4 × 200 m freestyle relay
34	Bronze	Jenny Guerrero	Swimming	Women's 200m breaststroke
35	Bronze	Jenny Guerrero	Swimming	Women's 400m individual medley
36	Bronze	Philippines	Swimming	Women's 4 × 100 m Medley Relay
37	Bronze	Manuel Rivero	Taekwondo	Men's Bantamweight -62kg
38	Bronze	Jefferthrom Go	Taekwondo	Men's Featherweight -67kg
39	Bronze	Dax Alberto Morfe	Taekwondo	Men's Middleweight -84kg
40	Bronze	Dindo Simpao	Taekwondo	Men's Heavyweight +84kg
41	Bronze	Jasmin Strachan	Taekwondo	Women's Bantamweight -55kg
42	Bronze	Johnny Arcilla; Joseph Victorino; Michael Morea III; Joseph Lizardo	Tennis	Men's team
43	Bronze	Czarina Mae Arevalo; Jennifer Saret; Kara Guzman	Tennis	Women's team
44	Bronze	Philippines	Volleyball	Women's team
45	Bronze	Nicolas Jaluag	Weightlifting	Men's 94kg
46	Bronze	Alvin Delos Santos	Weightlifting	Men's +105kg
47	Bronze	Arvin Ting	Wushu	Men's taolu Daoshu
48	Bronze	Willy Wang	Wushu	Men's taolu Jianshu
49	Bronze	Bobby Co	Wushu	Men's taolu Taijiquan/Taijijian
50	Bronze	Lily So	Wushu	Women's taolu Nandao/Nangun

=== Multiple ===
Name	Sport	1st place, gold medalist(s)	2nd place, silver medalist(s)	3rd place, bronze medalist(s)	Total
Eduardo Buenavista	Athletics	2	0	0	2
John Lozada	Athletics	1	1	0	2
Juvic Pagunsan	Golf	1	0	1	2
Willy Wang	wushu	1	0	1	2
Lizza Danila	Swimming	0	2	0	2
Miguel Mendoza	Swimming	0	2	0	2
Jenny Guerrero	Swimming	0	1	2	3
Pia Adelle Reyes	Gymnastics	0	1	2	3
Edgardo Macabitas Mayrina	Rowing	0	1	1	2
Joebert Delicano	Athletics	0	1	1	2
Jose Turingan Rodriguez	Rowing	0	1	1	2
Lerma Balauitan	Athletics	0	1	1	2
Lily So	Wushu	0	1	1	2
Precious Aissa Reyes	Gymnastics	0	0	2	3
Zardo Domenios	Diving	0	0	2	2

== Medal summary ==
=== By sports ===
Sport	Gold	Silver	Bronze	Total
Athletics	8	11	4	23
Bowling	4	5	1	10
Wushu	4	2	4	10
Billiards and snooker	3	6	1	10
Taekwondo	3	5	5	13
Karate	2	1	5	8
Shooting	1	5	5	11
Fencing	1	4	1	6
Judo	1	3	5	9
Golf	1	0	2	3
Basketball	1	0	1	2
Archery	1	0	0	1
Swimming	0	7	4	11
Pencak silat	0	4	4	8
Cycling	0	3	3	6
Boxing	0	2	5	7
Gymnastics	0	2	4	6
Rowing	0	2	2	4
Diving	0	1	2	3
Lawn bowls	0	1	2	3
Sailing	0	1	0	1
Tennis	0	0	2	2
Weightlifting	0	0	2	2
Squash	0	0	1	1
Volleyball	0	0	1	1
Totals (25 entries)	30	65	66	161
