= Lawn bowls at the 2001 SEA Games =

Lawn bowls competition

Lawn bowls at the 2001 Southeast Asian Games
- Venue: Bukit Kiara Sports Complex
- Location: Kuala Lumpur, Malaysia
- Date: 8 to 17 September 2001

Lawn bowls at the 2001 Southeast Asian Games took place in the Bukit Kiara Sports Complex in Kuala Lumpur, Malaysia from 8 to 17 September 2001.

== Medal table ==
* Host nation (Malaysia)

Rank	Nation	Gold	Silver	Bronze	Total
1	Malaysia (MAS)*	5	1	0	6
2	Thailand (THA)	1	0	1	2
3	Brunei (BRU)	0	4	0	4
4	Philippines (PHI)	0	1	2	3
5	Singapore (SIN)	0	0	3	3
Totals (5 entries)		6	6	6	18

== Medalists ==
=== Men ===
Event	Gold	Silver	Bronze
Singles	Malaysia; Syed Mohamad Syed Akil	Brunei; Abdul Rahman bin Haji Omar	Singapore; Chia Hon Yoong
Pairs	Malaysia; Mohamed Tazman Tahir; Sazeli Sani	Brunei; Md Salleh Awang Hitam; Haji Naim Brahim	Philippines; Marlo Dagpin; Reginaldo Bugo
Fours	Malaysia; Aziz Maswadi; Mohd Aidf Daud; Ibrahim Jusoh; Shalhuddin Wahab	Brunei; Ampuan Ahad Kasim; Rosli Ibrahim; Lokman Md Salleh; Mohamed Tahir Bohari	Thailand

=== Women ===
Event	Gold	Silver	Bronze
Singles	Thailand; Songsin Faithakam	Malaysia; Siti Zalina Ahmad	Philippines; Alicia Knight
Pairs	Malaysia; Nor Hashimah Ismail; Sarimah Abu Bakar	Philippines; Maria Rivera Leonora; Ronalyn Greenlees	Singapore; Mary Cheah Eok Lim; Rosemary Tessensohn
Fours	Malaysia; Nazura Ngahat; Rosnah Abu; Haslah Hassan; Bah Chu Mei	Brunei	Singapore; Amira Goh Quee Kee; Lee Beng Hua; Margaret Lim Poh Eng; Wendy Chua
