= Netball at the 2001 SEA Games =

- Venue: Juara Stadium, Kuala Lumpur
- Dates: September 2001
- Nations: 3

Medalists
gold medal	Malaysia
silver medal	Singapore
bronze medal	Thailand

Netball at the 2001 Southeast Asian Games was held at the Juara Stadium in Kuala Lumpur, Malaysia in September 2001. This is the first time netball was featured at the Southeast Asian Games.

== Participating nations ==
Three nations are competed in netball at the 2001 Southeast Asian Games:

- Malaysia
- Singapore
- Thailand

* Myanmar was set to participate but later withdrew from the netball tournament without playing a single match.

== Final ==
Malaysia won the netball event defeating Singapore in the final.

Report	Malaysia	53 – 42	Singapore	Juara Stadium, Kuala Lumpur

== Final standing ==
Rank	Team
1st place, gold medalist(s)	Malaysia
2nd place, silver medalist(s)	Singapore
3rd place, bronze medalist(s)	Thailand

Netball at the 2015 Southeast Asian Games champions

Malaysia
1st title
