= Diving at the 2001 SEA Games =

- Venue: National Aquatics Centre
- Dates: 14–15 September 2001

The diving competitions at the 2001 Southeast Asian Games in Kuala Lumpur took place from 14 to 15 September 2001 at the National Aquatics Centre within the National Sports Complex. It was one of four aquatic sports at the Games, along with swimming, water polo, and synchronised swimming.

== Medalists ==
=== Medal table ===
Rank	Nation	Gold	Silver	Bronze	Total
1	Malaysia	7	3	1	11
2	Thailand	0	2	1	3
3	Philippines	0	1	2	3
4	Vietnam	0	1	0	1
5	Indonesia	0	0	3	3
Totals (5 entries)		7	7	7	21

=== Men ===
Event	Gold	Silver	Bronze
3 m springboard	Yeoh Ken Nee; Malaysia	Suchart Pichi; Thailand	Zardo Domenios; Philippines
10 m platform	Mohd Azheem Bahari; Malaysia	Yeoh Ken Nee; Malaysia	Husaini Noor; Indonesia
Synchronised 3 m springboard	Malaysia (MAS); Rosharissham Roslan; Yeoh Ken Nee	Thailand (THA); Suchart Pichi; Meerit Insawang	Philippines (PHI); Zardo Domenios; Jaime V Asok
Synchronised 10 m platform	Malaysia (MAS); Yeoh Ken Nee; Mohd Azheem Bahari	Malaysia (MAS); Low Lap Bun and Noraznizal Najib	Thailand (THA); Suchart Pichi; Sareerapat Pimsamsee

=== Women ===
Event	Gold	Silver	Bronze
3 m springboard	Leong Mun Yee; Malaysia	Sheila Mae Peres; Philippines	Rosatimah Muhammad; Malaysia
10 m platform	Leong Mun Yee; Malaysia	Rosatimah Muhammad; Malaysia	Shenny Ratna Amelia; Indonesia
Synchronised 3 m springboard	Malaysia (MAS); Leong Mun Yee; Rosatimah Muhammad	Vietnam (VIE); Hoang Thanth Tra; Mai Thi Hai Yen	Indonesia (INA); Eka Purnama Indah; Nani Suryani
