= Swimming at the 2001 SEA Games =

- Venue: National Aquatics Centre
- Dates: 10–18 September 2001

The swimming competitions at the 2001 SEA Games in Kuala Lumpur took place from 10 to 18 September 2001 at the National Aquatics Centre within the National Sports Complex. It was one of four aquatic sports at the Games, along with swimming, water polo and synchronised swimming.

== Medalist ==
Men's events

Event	Gold		Silver		Bronze	
50 m freestyle	(Indonesia) Richard Sam Bera	23.03	(Thailand) Arwut Chinnapasaen	23.36	(Malaysia) Allen Ong Hou Ming	23.55
100 m freestyle	(Indonesia) Richard Sam Bera	50.8	(Malaysia) Allen Ong Hou Ming	51.31	(Singapore) Mark Chay	51.76
200 m freestyle	(Singapore) Mark Chay	1:52.67	(Thailand) Dulyarit Phuangthong	1:52.87	(Singapore) Sng Ju Wei	1:54.33
400 m freestyle	(Thailand) Torwai Sethsothorn	3:58.18	(Philippines) Miguel Mendoza	3:59.75	(Malaysia) Dieung Manggang	4:00.12
1500 m freestyle	(Thailand) Torwai Sethsothorn	15:49.72	(Philippines) Miguel Mendoza	15:54.00	(Malaysia) Dieung Manggang	15:55.73
100 m backstroke	(Malaysia) Alex Lim Keng Liat	56.16	(Thailand) Dulyarit Phuangthong	57.71	(Singapore) Gary Tan	57.89
200 m backstroke	(Malaysia) Alex Lim Keng Liat	2:02.91	(Singapore) Gary Tan	2:06.10	(Singapore) Gerald Koh	2:07.01
100 m breaststroke	(Malaysia) Wong Fu Kang	1:02.16	(Vietnam) Tran Xian Hien	1:04.94	(Indonesia) Muhammad Akbar Nasution	1:06.04
200 m breaststroke	(Malaysia) Elvin Chia	2:18.40	(Indonesia) Muhammad Akbar Nasution	2:22.82	(Thailand) Chanarong Amonattakul	2:23.48
100 m butterfly	(Malaysia) Anthony Ang	55.40	(Malaysia) Allen Ong Hou Ming	55.72	(Singapore) Gan Wei Ming	56.38
200 m butterfly	(Malaysia) Anthony Ang	2:01.84	(Singapore) Gan Wei Ming	2:05.14	(Malaysia) Dieung Manggang	2:05.70
200 m individual medley	(Thailand) Dulyarit Phuangthong	2:05.75	(Philippines) Miguel Molina	2:06.25	(Thailand) Pathunyu Yimsomruay	2:07.38
400 m individual medley	(Thailand) Torwai Sethsothorn	4:29.43	(Philippines) Carlo Piccio	4:30.31	(Thailand) Pathunyu Yimsomruay	4:32.29
4 × 100 m freestyle relay	Singapore	3:27.49	Indonesia	3:31.01	Thailand	3:39.38
4 × 200 m freestyle relay	Singapore	7:38.82	Thailand	7:39.76	Philippines	7:41.17
4 × 100 m medley relay	Malaysia	3:46.29	Singapore	3:51.36	Indonesia	3:52.91

Women's events

Event	Gold		Silver		Bronze	
50 m freestyle	(Myanmar) Moe Thu Aung	26.34	(Singapore) Joscelin Yeo Wei Ling	26.41	(Singapore) Jacqueline Lim Kim Tor	26.79
100 m freestyle	(Singapore) Joscelin Yeo Wei Ling	57.13	(Myanmar) Moe Thu Aung	57.61	(Thailand) Pilin Tachakittiranan	58.69
200 m freestyle	(Thailand) Pilin Tachakittiranan	2:04.70	(Thailand) Chorkaew Choompol	2:05.98	(Indonesia) Siripiya Sutanto	2:07.24
400 m freestyle	(Thailand) Ravee Intporn-Udom	4:24.53	(Thailand) Pilin Tachakittiranan	4:24.73	(Malaysia) Sia Wai Yen	4:24.87
800 m freestyle	(Thailand) Ravee Intporn-Udom	9:02.84	(Malaysia) Sia Wai Yen	9:03.00	(Thailand) Pornrada Srisawat	9:10.96
100 m backstroke	(Thailand) Chonlathorn Vorathamrong	1:03.93	(Philippines) Lizza Danila	1:05.10	(Thailand) Chorkaew Choompol	1:07.34
200 m backstroke	(Thailand) Chonlathorn Vorathamrong	2:19.82	(Philippines) Lizza Danila	2:23.47	(Malaysia) Sia Wai Yen	2:23.87
100 m breaststroke	(Singapore) Nicolette Teo	1:12.64	(Philippines) Jenny Guerrero	1:12.91	(Malaysia) Siow Yi Ting	1:13.69
200 m breaststroke	(Malaysia) Siow Yi Ting	2:31.90	(Singapore) Nicolette Teo	2:35.01	(Philippines) Jenny Guerrero	2:36.05
100 m butterfly	(Singapore) Joscelin Yeo Wei Ling	1:01.16	(Myanmar) Moe Thu Aung	1:01.76	(Thailand) Pilin Tachakittiranan	1:03.69
200 m butterfly	(Singapore) Christel Bouvron Mei Yen	2:17.37	(Thailand) Pilin Tachakittiranan	2:19.62	(Thailand) Tachaphorn Iamsanitamorn	2:20.64
200 m individual medley	(Singapore) Joscelin Yeo Wei Ling	2:19.76	(Malaysia) Siow Yi Ting	2:21.80	(Malaysia) Sia Wai Yen	2:22.44
400 m individual medley	(Malaysia) Sia Wai Yen	4:55.87	(Thailand) Ravee Intporn-Udom	5:03.00	(Philippines) Jenny Guerrero	5:08.09
4 × 100 m freestyle relay	Thailand	3:54.11	Singapore	3:54.75	Malaysia	4:03.38
4 × 200 m freestyle relay	Thailand	8:32.07	Singapore	8:38.73	Malaysia	8:45.14
4 × 100 m medley relay	Thailand	4:22.01	Singapore	4:23.41	Philippines	4:23.74
