= Synchronized swimming at the 2001 SEA Games =

- Venue: National Aquatics Centre
- Dates: 16–17 September 2001

The synchronized swimming competitions at the 2001 Southeast Asian Games in Kuala Lumpur took place from 16 to 17 September 2001 at the National Aquatics Centre within the National Sports Complex. It was one of four aquatic sports at the Games, along with diving, swimming and water polo.

== Participating nations ==
A total of 13 athletes from five nations competed in synchronized swimming at the 2001 Southeast Asian Games:

- Indonesia (2)
- Malaysia (2)
- Singapore (3)
- Thailand (3)
- Vietnam (3)

== Medalists ==
=== Medal table ===
Rank	Nation	Gold	Silver	Bronze	Total
1	Malaysia	2	1	0	3
2	Indonesia	0	1	1	2
3	Vietnam	0	0	1	1
Totals (3 entries)		2	2	2	6

=== Women ===
Event	Gold	Silver	Bronze
Solo	Suzanna Ghazali Bujang; Malaysia	Sara Kamil Yusof; Malaysia	Merlin Anggreny; Indonesia
Duet	Suzanna Ghazali Bujang; Sara Kamil Yusof; Malaysia	Tyas Titisari and Merlin Anggreny; Indonesia	Nguyen Nhu Thuy Duong; Le Thi Huyen Trang; Vietnam
