= Weightlifting at the 2001 SEA Games =

- Venue: Johor Jaya Multi-Purpose Hall, Johor
- Dates: 11–14 September 2001

Weightlifting at the 2001 SEA Games was held from September 11 to September 14. All events were held at the Johor Jaya Multi-Purpose Hall, Johor, Malaysia.

== Medalists ==
=== Men ===
Event	Gold	Silver	Bronze
56 kg	Jadi Setiadi; Indonesia	Amirul Hamizan Ibrahim; Malaysia	Maribo Chehtae; Thailand
62 kg	Chom Singnoi; Thailand^{^}	Nusiyanto; Indonesia	Nguyen Manth Thang; Vietnam
69 kg	Misdan Yunip; Indonesia	Suriya Dattuyawat; Thailand	Muhammad Hidayat Hamidon; Malaysia
77 kg	Erwin Abdullah; Indonesia	Sunti Yonjaitun; Thailand	Ahmad Fazlan Ghazali; Malaysia
85 kg	Yudi Suhartono; Indonesia	Nguyen Quoc Thanh; Vietnam	Luu Yan Thang; Vietnam
94 kg	Edmund Yeo; Malaysia	Narongsak Panyaake; Thailand	Nicoias O.Jaluag; Philippines
105 kg	Therdkhiat Puekkasem; Thailand	Junaedi; Indonesia	Jerry Nonong; Malaysia
Over 105 kg	Nopadol Wanwang; Thailand	Joko Hanggono; Indonesia	Alvin D. Delas Santos; Philippines

- ^{^} Indonesia's Gustar Junianto won gold medal in the men's 62 kg but failed a drug test those stripped his medal, All three athletes behind him were upgraded from their original medal position.

=== Women ===
Event	Gold	Silver	Bronze
48 kg	Daw Kay Thin Win; Myanmar	Daw Kay Kyi Than; Myanmar	Sri Indriyani; Indonesia
53 kg	Swe Swe Win; Myanmar	Raema Lisa Rumbewas; Indonesia	Udomporn Polsak; Thailand
58 kg	Tanti Pratiwi; Indonesia	Truong Thi Yen; Vietnam	Doan Thi Hong Thom; Vietnam
63 kg	Khin Moe Nwe; Myanmar	Saipin Detsaeng; Thailand	Duong Thi Ngoc; Vietnam
69 kg	Mya Sanda Do; Myanmar	Pawina Thongsuk; Thailand	Tran Thi Tai; Vietnam

== Medal table ==
Legend

* Host nation (Malaysia)

Rank	Nation	Gold	Silver	Bronze	Total
1	Indonesia (INA)	5	4	1	10
2	Myanmar (MYA)	4	1	0	5
3	Thailand (THA)	3	5	2	10
4	Malaysia (MAS)*	1	1	3	5
5	Vietnam (VIE)	0	2	5	7
6	Philippines (PHI)	0	0	2	2
Totals (6 entries)		13	13	13	39
