= Taekwondo at the 2001 SEA Games =

Taekwondo competition

- Venue: Pembandaran Pasir Gudang Indoor Stadium, Johor
- Dates: 9–12 September 2001

Taekwondo at the 2001 SEA Games was held in Pembandaran Pasir Gudang Indoor Stadium, Johor, Malaysia from 9 to 12 September 2001

== Medalist ==
=== Men's events ===
| Event | Gold | Silver | Bronze |
|---|---|---|---|
| Fin Weight (-54kg) | Roberto Cruz; Philippines | Shahidin Shah Farook; Malaysia | Wissanu Panprom; Thailand |
| Fin Weight (-54kg) | Roberto Cruz; Philippines | Shahidin Shah Farook; Malaysia | Inosensius Ebertus; Indonesia |
| Fly Weight (-58 kg) | Ussadate Sutthikunkarn; Thailand | Satriyo Rahadhani; Indonesia | Edwin Gerard Lam; Singapore |
| Fly Weight (-58 kg) | Ussadate Sutthikunkarn; Thailand | Satriyo Rahadhani; Indonesia | Tran Nhat Nam; Vietnam |
| Bantam Weight (-62 kg) | Derry Dharmansyah; Indonesia | Jutapol Yodanya; Thailand | Benjamin Raj; Malaysia |
| Bantam Weight (-62 kg) | Derry Dharmansyah; Indonesia | Jutapol Yodanya; Thailand | Manuel Rivero; Philippines |
| Feather Weight (-67 kg) | S. Sarawanan; Malaysia | Si Thu Win; Myanmar | Punya Dissoi; Thailand |
| Feather Weight (-67 kg) | S. Sarawanan; Malaysia | Si Thu Win; Myanmar | Jefferthom Go; Philippines |
| Light Weight (-72 kg) | U Thit Lwin; Myanmar | Donald David Geisler; Philippines | Saneh Jaritruam; Thailand |
| Light Weight (-72 kg) | U Thit Lwin; Myanmar | Donald David Geisler; Philippines | Bayu Firmansyah; Indonesia |
| Half heavyweight (-78 kg) | Kriangkrai Noikerd; Thailand | Basuki Nugroho; Indonesia | Zaw Myo Win; Myanmar |
| Half heavyweight (-78 kg) | Kriangkrai Noikerd; Thailand | Basuki Nugroho; Indonesia | Doan Trong Sinh; Vietnam |
| Middle Weight (-84 kg) | Phan Tan Dat; Vietnam | Rosandi; Indonesia | Meng Sokry; Cambodia |
| Middle Weight (-84 kg) | Phan Tan Dat; Vietnam | Rosandi; Indonesia | Dax Alberto Morfe; Philippines |
| Heavy Weight (+84 kg) | Nguyễn Văn Hùng; Vietnam | S.Vijendran; Malaysia | Dindo Simpao; Philippines |
| Heavy Weight (+84 kg) | Nguyễn Văn Hùng; Vietnam | S.Vijendran; Malaysia | Them Thavereak; Cambodia |

=== Women's events ===
| Event | Gold | Silver | Bronze |
|---|---|---|---|
| Fin Weight (-47 kg) | Nguyen Thi Huyen Dieu; Vietnam | Eva Marie Ditan; Philippines | Kanjana Sutthiphaet; Thailand |
| Fin Weight (-47 kg) | Nguyen Thi Huyen Dieu; Vietnam | Eva Marie Ditan; Philippines | Khin Swee Oo; Myanmar |
| Fly Weight (-51 kg) | Nguyen Thi Xuan Mai; Vietnam | Chatkaew Muttasuwan; Thailand | Sengdeuane Bounleuth; Laos |
| Fly Weight (-51 kg) | Nguyen Thi Xuan Mai; Vietnam | Chatkaew Muttasuwan; Thailand | Juana Wangsa Putri; Indonesia |
| Bantam Weight (-55 kg) | Elaine Teo; Malaysia | Pham Thi Phuong Quyen; Vietnam | Jasmin Strachan; Philippines |
| Bantam Weight (-55 kg) | Elaine Teo; Malaysia | Pham Thi Phuong Quyen; Vietnam | Vorakorn Sinlapajarn; Thailand |
| Feather Weight (-59 kg) | Nootcharin Sukkhongdumnoen; Thailand | Kalindi Tamayo; Philippines | Soo Lai Yin; Malaysia |
| Feather Weight (-59 kg) | Nootcharin Sukkhongdumnoen; Thailand | Kalindi Tamayo; Philippines | Voppy Trismawanty; Indonesia |
| Light Weight (-63 kg) | Veronica Domingo; Philippines | Onyas Nurmala; Indonesia | Piyaporn Dongnoi; Thailand |
| Light Weight (-63 kg) | Veronica Domingo; Philippines | Onyas Nurmala; Indonesia | Nguyen Thi Kim Nga; Vietnam |
| Welter Weight (-67 kg) | Ma Nelia Sy Ycasas; Philippines | Duangsuda T-hasirikun; Thailand | Lee Pei Fen; Malaysia |
| Welter Weight (-67 kg) | Ma Nelia Sy Ycasas; Philippines | Duangsuda T-hasirikun; Thailand | Nguyen Thi Ngoc Tram; Vietnam |
| Welter Weight (-72 kg) | Emerald Margareth; Indonesia | Sally Solis; Philippines | Ho Thi Thanh On; Vietnam |
| Welter Weight (-72 kg) | Emerald Margareth; Indonesia | Sally Solis; Philippines | Lee Show Hui; Malaysia |
| Heavy Weight (+72 kg) | Che Chew Chan; Malaysia | Margarita M-E Bonifacio; Philippines | Ertina Nopiyanti; Indonesia |
| Heavy Weight (+72 kg) | Che Chew Chan; Malaysia | Margarita M-E Bonifacio; Philippines | Tran Thi Ngoc Bich; Vietnam |

== Medal table ==
Legend

* Host nation (Malaysia)

| Rank | Nation | Gold | Silver | Bronze | Total |
|---|---|---|---|---|---|
| 1 | Vietnam | 4 | 1 | 6 | 11 |
| 2 | Philippines | 3 | 5 | 5 | 13 |
| 3 | Thailand | 3 | 3 | 6 | 12 |
| 4 | Malaysia* | 3 | 2 | 4 | 9 |
| 5 | Indonesia | 2 | 4 | 5 | 11 |
| 6 | Myanmar | 1 | 1 | 2 | 4 |
| 7 | Cambodia | 0 | 0 | 2 | 2 |
| 8 | Laos | 0 | 0 | 1 | 1 |
| 8 | Singapore | 0 | 0 | 1 | 1 |
| Totals (9 entries) | | 16 | 16 | 32 | 64 |
