= Zardo Domenios =

Filipino diver (born 1984)

Personal information
- Nationality: Filipino
- Born: April 26, 1984 (age 42) Davao City, Philippines
- Height: 5 ft 5 in (164 cm)
- Weight: 121 lb (55 kg)

Sport
- Sport: Diving
Medal record
Men's diving
Representing Philippines
Southeast Asian Games
Gold medal – first place	2005 Manila	3 m synchro
Silver medal – second place	2007 Nakhon Ratchasima	1 m springboard
Silver medal – second place	2007 Nakhon Ratchasima	3 m synchro
Silver medal – second place	2009 Vientiane	3 m synchro
Bronze medal – third place	2001 Kuala Lumpur	3 m springboard
Bronze medal – third place	2001 Kuala Lumpur	3 m synchro
Bronze medal – third place	2003 Hanoi	3 m springboard
Bronze medal – third place	2005 Manila	1 m springboard
Bronze medal – third place	2005 Manila	3 m springboard
Bronze medal – third place	2007 Nakhon Ratchasima	3 m springboard

Zardo Domenios (born April 26, 1984) is a Filipino diver. He competed in the men's 3 metre springboard event at the 2000 Summer Olympics.
