= Sara Kamil-Yusof =

Malaysian synchronised swimmer (born 1984)

Personal information
- Born: 18 December 1984 (age 41) Petaling Jaya, Selangor, Malaysia

Sport
- Sport: Swimming
- Strokes: Artistic swimming
Medal record
Artistic swimming
Representing Malaysia
SEA Games
Gold medal – first place	2001 Kuala Lumpur	Duet
Silver medal – second place	2001 Kuala Lumpur	Solo

Sara Kamil-Yusof (born 18 December 1984 in Petaling Jaya, Selangor) is a Malaysian synchronised swimmer. She started synchronised swimming at the age of 12 in early 1997. A few months later, her coach retired, and Sara stopped swimming. However, later that year, she was invited to join several other girls for a training stint for a few months in Canada for an upcoming national competition.

By mid-1998, she had joined the synchronised swimming National Team of Malaysia. Her first competition, where she represented her country, was at the World Youth Games in Moscow, Russia in the team and figures categories. She later participated in a duet category as a demonstrator for synchronised swimming at the 1998 Commonwealth Games, held in Kuala Lumpur, Malaysia.

In 2000, she participated in the Olympic Qualification Tournament, held in Sydney, Australia in the duet category, where she placed 31st and did not qualify for the 2000 Summer Olympics. She also participated in her first ever FINA World Championships, held in Fukuoka, Japan, in the duet category, where she placed 23rd with a score of 75.931.

She won a gold medal at the 2001 SEA Games in Kuala Lumpur with Suzanna Ghazali. Then, leading up to the 2002 Commonwealth Games in Manchester, England, it was thought that Sara was likely to win the bronze medal in the duet category. She had spent months in Vancouver, Canada training with one of Canada's seven national coaches, where her performances suggested the bronze. Her technical and free duet routines were tougher, better choreographed and executed than those of the Australian routines, but to the surprise of many the Australian duet gained higher marks from the judges. She placed fourth with a total score of 80.500, her personal best to that time.

In 2003, Sara participated in her second FINA World Championships but did not fulfill expectations, scoring low again, placing 30th of 34 in her duet technical and 26th in duet free routine/overall. Her best finish/score in her third Sukma Games (Pan Malaysian National Games) in Paroi, Negeri Sembilan was first place in the team and duet events. She scored marks ranging from 7s and 8s for the team event and an all 8s marks for her duet event which is the first time she had ever done so, with a total score for her duet event of 84.000, her competition personal-best.
