= Mohamed Aziz Maswadi =

Malaysian lawn bowler (born 1956)

Personal information
- Nationality: Malaysian
- Born: 5 February 1956 (age 70)
Medal record
lawn bowls
Commonwealth Games
Bronze medal – third place	1998 Kuala Lumpur	pairs
Bronze medal – third place	2002 Manchester	pairs
Asia Pacific Bowls Championships
Bronze medal – third place	2001 Melbourne	fours
Southeast Asian Games
Gold medal – first place	2001 Kuala Lumpur	fours

Mohamed Aziz Maswadi is a Malaysian former international lawn bowler and national coach.

== Bowls career ==
Aziz was born in 1956 and won the bronze medal in the pairs with Mohamed Tazman Tahir at the 1998 Commonwealth Games in Kuala Lumpur. Four years later he repeated the feat by winning another bronze in the men's pairs with Safuan Said at the 2002 Commonwealth Games in Manchester.

He won the fours bronze medal at the 2001 Asia Pacific Bowls Championships, in Melbourne. In 2001, he won the gold medal in the fours event at the 2001 Southeast Asian Games in Kuala Lumpur.

== Coaching ==
He was the Malaysian team coach for the 2010 Commonwealth Games.
