= Boxing at the 2001 SEA Games =

Boxing competitions

- Venue: Paroi Centre Club Sports Centre, Negeri Sembilan
- Dates: 9–16 September 2001

Boxing at the 2001 SEA Games was held in Paroi Centre Club Sports Centre, Negeri Sembilan, Malaysia from 9 to 16 September 2001

== Medalist ==
=== Men's events ===
Event	Gold	Silver	Bronze
Pin Weight (Below 45kg)	Bonyx Saweho; Indonesia	Kaeo Pongprayoon; Thailand	Yan Lin Aung; Myanmar
Pin Weight (Below 45kg)	Bonyx Saweho; Indonesia	Kaeo Pongprayoon; Thailand	Zamzai Azizi Mohamad; Malaysia
Light-Fly Weight (45-48kg)	Suban Pannon; Thailand	Sapok Biki; Malaysia	Karel Muskanan; Indonesia
Light-Fly Weight (45-48kg)	Suban Pannon; Thailand	Sapok Biki; Malaysia	Kyaw Swar Aung; Myanmar
Fly Weight (48-51kg)	Somjit Jongjohor; Thailand	Rakib Ahmad; Malaysia	Roeung Sarath; Cambodia
Fly Weight (48-51kg)	Somjit Jongjohor; Thailand	Rakib Ahmad; Malaysia	Violito Payla; Philippines
Bantam Weight (51-54kg)	Sontaya Wongprates; Thailand	Arlan S. Lerio; Philippines	Aung Tun Lin; Myanmar
Bantam Weight (51-54kg)	Sontaya Wongprates; Thailand	Arlan S. Lerio; Philippines	Jaiwat Yamun; Malaysia
Feather Weight (54-57kg)	Suttisak Samaksaman; Thailand	Ramil U. Zambales; Philippines	Nay Zaw; Myanmar
Feather Weight (54-57kg)	Suttisak Samaksaman; Thailand	Ramil U. Zambales; Philippines	Tanovanh Nilonedone; Laos
Light Weight (57-60kg)	Adnan Yusoh; Malaysia	Somchai Nakbalee; Thailand	Larry Semillano; Philippines
Light Weight (57-60kg)	Adnan Yusoh; Malaysia	Somchai Nakbalee; Thailand	Khounady Vilasak; Laos
Light-Welter Weight (60-64kg)	Mohamad Zainudin Sidi; Malaysia	Pongsak Hrianthuanthong; Thailand	Oudone Khanxay; Laos
Light-Welter Weight (60-64kg)	Mohamad Zainudin Sidi; Malaysia	Pongsak Hrianthuanthong; Thailand	Romeo T. Brin; Philippines
Welter Weight (64-67kg)	Manon Boonjumnong; Thailand	Shuhairi Hussain; Malaysia	Reques Feros; Indonesia
Welter Weight (64-67kg)	Manon Boonjumnong; Thailand	Shuhairi Hussain; Malaysia	Reynaldo L. Galido; Philippines
Light-Middle Weight (67-71kg)	Dachapon Suwunnaliad; Thailand	Hobkhob Somsanouk; Laos	Joko Suryono; Indonesia
Light-Middle Weight (67-71kg)	Dachapon Suwunnaliad; Thailand	Hobkhob Somsanouk; Laos	Rudy Hairy W. Mohd Yussof; Brunei
Middle Weight (71-75kg)	Somchai Chimlum; Thailand	Zamri Mustafa; Malaysia	Htay Lwin; Myanmar
Middle Weight (71-75kg)	Somchai Chimlum; Thailand	Zamri Mustafa; Malaysia	Maximino Tabangcora; Philippines
Light-Heavy Weight (75-81kg)	Albert Papilaya; Indonesia	Pornchai Thongburan; Thailand	Tin Thein; Myanmar
Light-Heavy Weight (75-81kg)	Albert Papilaya; Indonesia	Pornchai Thongburan; Thailand	Che Andli Che Hashim; Malaysia

== Medal table ==
Legend

* Host nation (Malaysia)

Rank	Nation	Gold	Silver	Bronze	Total
1	Thailand (THA)	7	4	0	11
2	Malaysia (MAS)*	2	4	3	9
3	Indonesia (INA)	2	0	3	5
4	Philippines (PHI)	0	2	5	7
5	Laos (LAO)	0	1	3	4
6	Myanmar (MYA)	0	0	6	6
7	Brunei (BRU)	0	0	1	1
7	Cambodia (CAM)	0	0	1	1
Totals (8 entries)		11	11	22	44
