= Golf at the 2001 SEA Games =

- Venue: Sungai Long Golf and Country Club, Selangor
- Dates: 10–16 September 2001

Golf at the 2001 SEA Games was held from 10 September to 16 September. All events were held at the Sungai Long Golf and Country Club, Selangor, Malaysia.

== Medalists ==
=== Men ===
Event	Gold	Silver	Bronze
Individual	Juvic Pagunsan; Philippines	Airil Rizman; Malaysia	Wisut Artjanawat; Thailand
Team	Malaysia (MAS); S. Sivachandran; Airil Rizman; Shaaban Hussin; Sahal Saedin	Thailand (THA); Ronnachai Jamnong; Wisut Artjanawat; Prom Meesawat; Pariya Junhasawadikul	Philippines (PHI); Juvic Pagunsan; Jay E Bayron; Marvin R Dunmandan; Jesselito Saragoza

=== Women ===
Event	Gold	Silver	Bronze
Individual	Onnarin Sattayabanphot; Thailand	Titiya Plucksataporn; Thailand	Sitti Retno Purwandi; Indonesia
Team	Indonesia (INA); Sitti Retno Purwandi; Ani Iman; Titi Puryanti	Thailand (THA); Onnarin Sattayabanphot; Titiya Plucksataporn; Morakod Kladpetch	Philippines (PHI); Heidi Chua; Carmelette M. Villaroman; Maria Ruby Chico

== Medal table ==
Legend

* Host nation (Malaysia)

Rank	Nation	Gold	Silver	Bronze	Total
1	Thailand	1	3	1	5
2	Malaysia*	1	1	0	2
3	Philippines	1	0	2	3
4	Indonesia	1	0	1	2
Totals (4 entries)		4	4	4	12
