= Fencing at the 2001 SEA Games =

Fencing at the SEA Games
- Venue: JKR headquarters, Kuala Lumpur
- Dates: 10–12 September 2001

Fencing at the 2001 SEA Games was held in JKR headquarters, Kuala Lumpur, Malaysia from 10 to 12 September 2001 Only individual event was held.

== Medalists ==
Event	Gold	Silver	Bronze
Men's Individual Sabre	Walbert Gumabao Mendoza; Philippines	Edmon Santog Velez; Philippines	Sares Limkangwanmongkol; Thailand
Men's Individual Sabre	Walbert Gumabao Mendoza; Philippines	Edmon Santog Velez; Philippines	Olfi Rumuat; Indonesia
Men's Individual Foil	Nontapat Panchan; Thailand	Edi Suwarto Sucipto; Indonesia	Rolando Canlas; Philippines
Men's Individual Foil	Nontapat Panchan; Thailand	Edi Suwarto Sucipto; Indonesia	Preecha Tintiruk; Thailand
Men's Individual Epee	Perdian Tragi; Indonesia	Richard Gomez; Philippines	Ang Chez Yee; Singapore
Men's Individual Epee	Perdian Tragi; Indonesia	Richard Gomez; Philippines	Siriroj Rathprasert; Thailand
Women's Individual Foil	Christina Marthina Timisela; Indonesia	Lenita Garcia Reyes; Philippines	Teo Ah Heok; Singapore
Women's Individual Foil	Christina Marthina Timisela; Indonesia	Lenita Garcia Reyes; Philippines	Woranud Boonmahanak; Thailand
Women's Individual Epee	Siritida Choochokkol; Thailand	Lorena Ann Dulay Sandiego; Philippines	Teng Nan See; Singapore
Women's Individual Epee	Siritida Choochokkol; Thailand	Lorena Ann Dulay Sandiego; Philippines	Janjila Binsolam; Thailand

== Medal table ==
Legend

Rank	Nation	Gold	Silver	Bronze	Total
1	Indonesia	2	1	1	4
2	Thailand	2	0	5	7
3	Philippines	1	4	1	6
4	Singapore	0	0	3	3
Totals (4 entries)		5	5	10	20
