= Gymnastics at the 2001 SEA Games =

- Venue: Putra Indoor Stadium, National Sports Complex
- Dates: 8–16 September 2001

Gymnastics at the 2001 SEA Games was divided into two sub-categories: artistic gymnastics, and rhythmic gymnastics. The artistic gymnastics was held from September 8 to September 12, and the rhythmic gymnastics from September 14 to September 16. All events were held at the Putra Indoor Stadium National Sports Complex, in Kuala Lumpur, Malaysia.

Malaysia, the host country, was the most successful nation, winning sixteen gold medals out of twenty and twenty-seven medals in total. Thailand and Indonesia each won two gold medals, with both country won twelve medals in total. The Philippines and Vietnam respectively won six and three medals overall.

Malaysia had a sweep of women's artistic gymnastics events and Rhythmic gymnastics and dominated men's artistic gymnastics events. Malaysian team won its first ever gold in the men's team even and won four gold medals in total. Several athletes won multiple individual golds medals, veteran Jonathan Sianturi won two gold medals for Indonesia on Individual all-around and Pommel horse. Nurul Fatiha Abdul Hamid of Malaysia won women's Individual all-around and Floor exercise events. Chang Zhi Wei of Malaysia won women's Uneven bars and Balance beam events. Goh Yi Wei and Celestie Chan of Malaysia swept all individual gold medals on Rhythmic gymnastics. Goh won Individual all-around, clubs, and hoop events and Chan won ball, and rope events respectively.

== Medalist ==
=== Artistic gymnastics ===
==== Men's events ====
| Event | Gold | Silver | Bronze |
|---|---|---|---|
| Team all-around | Malaysia (MAS); Ng Shu Wai; Loke Yik Siang; Onn Kwang Tung; Mohd Irwan Miskob; Ooi Wei Siang; Heng Wah Jing | Thailand (THA); Saran Suwansa; Sattra Suwansa; Amornthep Waewsaeng; Aekaraj Chankroong; Ravis Sampoonachot; Peerapol Chouchirdthai | Indonesia (INA); Jonathan Sianturi; M. Aldila Akhbar; Lulu Manurung; Sepri Haryadi; Helmy Firmansyah; Abdul Razak Siri |
| Individual all-around | Jonathan Sianturi; Indonesia | Sattra Suwansa; Thailand | Loke Yik Siang; Malaysia |
| Floor | Ng Shu Wai; Malaysia | Roel L. Ramirez; Philippines | Jonathan Sianturi; Indonesia |
| Pommel horse | Jonathan Sianturi; Indonesia | Onn Kwang Tung; Malaysia | Truong Minh Sang; Vietnam |
| Rings | Amornthep Waewsaeng; Thailand | Jonathan Sianturi; Indonesia | Lulu Manurung; Indonesia |
| Vault | Loke Yik Siang; Malaysia | Helmy Firmansyah; Indonesia; Duong Ngoc Dam; Vietnam | |
| Parallel bars | Mohd Irwan Miskob; Malaysia | Ng Shu Wai; Malaysia | Sepri Haryadi; Indonesia |
| Horizontal bar | Sattra Suwansa; Thailand | Ng Shu Wai; Malaysia | Saran Suwansa; Thailand |

==== Women's events ====
| Event | Gold | Silver | Bronze |
|---|---|---|---|
| Team all-around | Malaysia (MAS); Nurul Fatiha Abdul Hamid; Au Li Yen; Chang Zhi Wei; Chang Siew Ting; Yap Yee Yin | Thailand (THA); Rattanaporn Khemtong; Krittaporn Sawangsri; Nattakarn Khanchai; Nattaporn Khanchai; Tityubol Banlengkan; Phanumas Banthao | Philippines (PHI); Pia Adelle Reyes; Precious Aisssa Reyes; Phoebe Danielle Espiritu; Anna Francesca Cruz; Aianna Difuntorium |
| Individual all-around | Nurul Fatiha Abdul Hamid; Malaysia | Chang Zhi Wei; Malaysia | Nattakarn Khanchai; Thailand |
| Vault | Au Li Yen; Malaysia | Yap Yee Yin; Malaysia | Dewi Prahara; Indonesia |
| Uneven bars | Chang Zhi Wei; Malaysia | Afrina Suryani Siahaan; Indonesia | Chang Siew Ting; Malaysia |
| Balance beam | Chang Zhi Wei; Malaysia | Pia Adelle Reyes; Philippines | Precious Aissa Reyes; Philippines |
| Floor | Nurul Fatiha Abdul Hamid; Malaysia | Au Li Yen; Malaysia | Pia Adelle Reyes; Philippines |

=== Rhythmic gymnastics ===
| Event | Gold | Silver | Bronze |
|---|---|---|---|
| Team all-around | Malaysia (MAS); Goh Yi Wei; Celestie Chan; Sarina Sundra Rajah | Thailand (THA); Tharatip Sridee; Sarochini Sawakchim; Pattra Sarikaputra | Indonesia (INA); Yulianti; Jumaiyah; Oh Ze Ching |
| Individual all-around | Goh Yi Wei; Malaysia | Celestie Chan; Malaysia | Pattra Sarikaputra; Thailand |
| Hoop | Goh Yi Wei; Malaysia | Pattra Sarikaputra; Thailand | Sarina Sundra Rajah; Malaysia |
| Ball | Celestie Chan; Malaysia | Yuliyanti; Indonesia | Maria Angelica T. Basco; Philippines |
| Clubs | Goh Yi Wei; Malaysia | Celestie Chan; Malaysia | Pattra Sarikaputra; Thailand |
| Rope | Celestie Chan; Malaysia | Tharatip Sridee; Thailand | Nguyen Thu Ha; Vietnam |

== Medal table ==
Legend

* Host nation (Malaysia)

| Rank | Nation | Gold | Silver | Bronze | Total |
|---|---|---|---|---|---|
| 1 | Malaysia* | 16 | 8 | 3 | 27 |
| 2 | Thailand | 2 | 6 | 4 | 12 |
| 3 | Indonesia | 2 | 4 | 6 | 12 |
| 4 | Philippines | 0 | 2 | 4 | 6 |
| 5 | Vietnam | 0 | 1 | 2 | 3 |
| Totals (5 entries) | | 20 | 21 | 19 | 60 |
