= Syed Mohamad Syed Akil =

Malaysian international lawn bowler (born 1963)

Personal information
- Nationality: Malaysian
- Born: 19 September 1963 (age 62)

Sport
- Sport: Lawn bowls
Medal record
Representing Malaysia
Asia Pacific Bowls Championships
Bronze medal – third place	2003 Brisbane	triples
Bronze medal – third place	2003 Brisbane	fours
Southeast Asian Games
Gold medal – first place	2001 Kuala Lumpur	singles
Asian Lawn Bowls Championship
Gold medal – first place	2003 Kuala Lumpur	triples
Gold medal – first place	2003 Kuala Lumpur	fours
Gold medal – first place	2005 Kuala Lumpur	fours

Syed Mohamad Syed Akil is a Malaysian international lawn bowler.

== Bowls career ==
Syed Akil represented Malaysia at four consecutive Commonwealth Games in 1998, 2002, 2006 and 2010. He won the gold medal in the singles event at the 2001 Southeast Asian Games in Kuala Lumpur.

He won two bronze medals at the 2003 Asia Pacific Bowls Championships in Pine Rivers, Brisbane, Australia.
