= Gustar Junianto =

Indonesian weightlifter (born 1980)

Personal information
- Nationality: Indonesian
- Born: 14 June 1980 (age 44)

Sport
- Sport: Weightlifting

Gustar Junianto (born 14 June 1980) is an Indonesian weightlifter. He competed in the men's featherweight event at the 2004 Summer Olympics. He won a gold medal at the weightlifting competition at the 2001 Southeast Asian Games, but the award was stripped after he failed a test for the prohibited steroid nandrolone.
