= Judo at the 2001 SEA Games =

Judo competition

- Venue: Penang International Sports Arena, Penang
- Dates: 13–16 September 2001

Judo at the 2001 Southeast Asian Games was held in Penang International Sports Arena, Penang, Malaysia from 13 to 16 September 2001

== Medalist ==
=== Men's events ===
Event	Gold	Silver	Bronze
Extra-light Weight (-60 kg)	Chanchai Suksuwan; Thailand	Abraham Pulia; Philippines	Eko Prasetyo; Indonesia
Extra-light Weight (-60 kg)	Chanchai Suksuwan; Thailand	Abraham Pulia; Philippines	Kyaw Soe Naing; Myanmar
Half lightweight (-66 kg)	Panjabutra Bodi; Thailand	Aristotle Lucero; Philippines	Peter Taslim; Indonesia
Half lightweight (-66 kg)	Panjabutra Bodi; Thailand	Aristotle Lucero; Philippines	Tun Tin Htoo; Myanmar
Lightweight (-73 kg)	I Wayan Sutiko; Indonesia	Anantasak Suki; Thailand	Yan Naing Soe; Myanmar
Lightweight (-73 kg)	I Wayan Sutiko; Indonesia	Anantasak Suki; Thailand	Nguyen Ha Duy; Vietnam
Half middleweight (-81 kg)	John Baylon; Philippines	Surasak Riengthong; Thailand	Johanes Taslim; Indonesia
Half middleweight (-81 kg)	John Baylon; Philippines	Surasak Riengthong; Thailand	Dinh Quoc Hung; Vietnam
Middleweight (-90 kg)	Dwi Shimanto; Indonesia	Manop Leewat Janakl; Thailand	Sydney Schwarzkoff; Philippines
Middleweight (-90 kg)	Dwi Shimanto; Indonesia	Manop Leewat Janakl; Thailand	Nyan Soe; Myanmar
Half heavyweight (-100 kg)	Kresna Bayu; Indonesia	Tharalat Suttiphuli; Thailand	Khe Kommanivong; Laos
Half heavyweight (-100 kg)	Kresna Bayu; Indonesia	Tharalat Suttiphuli; Thailand	Rolando G. Dino; Philippines
Heavyweight (+100 kg)	Kampita Pitak; Thailand	Deni Zulfendri; Indonesia	Ku Su Yin; Malaysia
Heavyweight (+100 kg)	Kampita Pitak; Thailand	Deni Zulfendri; Indonesia	Nguyen Tan Vinh; Vietnam

=== Women's events ===
Event	Gold	Silver	Bronze
Extra-light Weight (-48 kg)	Thin Zar Soe; Myanmar	Nancy C. Quillotes; Philippines	Tangprapasson Nuang; Thailand
Extra-light Weight (-48 kg)	Thin Zar Soe; Myanmar	Nancy C. Quillotes; Philippines	Hinh My Linh; Vietnam
Half lightweight (-52 kg)	Aye Aye Thin; Myanmar	Jindasing Roongtawan; Thailand	Thai My Huong; Vietnam
Half lightweight (-52 kg)	Aye Aye Thin; Myanmar	Jindasing Roongtawan; Thailand	Maya Fransiska; Indonesia
Lightweight (-57 kg)	Endang Sri List; Indonesia	Sitthida Hassap; Thailand	Le Thi Thanh Tu; Vietnam
Lightweight (-57 kg)	Endang Sri List; Indonesia	Sitthida Hassap; Thailand	Elmarie Malasan; Philippines
Half middleweight (-63 kg)	Chantana Hanprasert; Thailand	Cheryl Goh Sze Wei; Singapore	Nguyen Thi Din; Vietnam
Half middleweight (-63 kg)	Chantana Hanprasert; Thailand	Cheryl Goh Sze Wei; Singapore	Lita Theresia; Indonesia
Middleweight (-70 kg)	Saguna Chalearmthip; Thailand	Aprilia Marzuki; Indonesia	Karen Solomon; Philippines
Middleweight (-70 kg)	Saguna Chalearmthip; Thailand	Aprilia Marzuki; Indonesia	Lay Nandar Aung; Myanmar
Half heavyweight (-78 kg)	Patcharee Pitchaipat; Thailand	Ngo Thi My Chau; Vietnam	Ira Purnamasari; Indonesia
Half heavyweight (-78 kg)	Patcharee Pitchaipat; Thailand	Ngo Thi My Chau; Vietnam	Marie Ano Aiza; Philippines
Heavyweight (+78 kg)	Paradawdee Pestonyee; Thailand	Cliffia; Indonesia	Lam Thi Oanh Vu; Vietnam

== Medal table ==
Legend

* Host nation (Malaysia)

Rank	Nation	Gold	Silver	Bronze	Total
1	Thailand (THA)	7	6	1	14
2	Indonesia (INA)	4	3	6	13
3	Myanmar (MYA)	2	0	5	7
4	Philippines (PHI)	1	3	5	9
5	Vietnam (VIE)	0	1	8	9
6	Singapore (SIN)	0	1	0	1
7	Laos (LAO)	0	0	1	1
7	Malaysia (MAS)*	0	0	1	1
Totals (8 entries)		14	14	27	55
