= Archery at the 2001 SEA Games =

- Venue: Bandaraya Square, Johor Bahru
- Dates: 11–15 September 2001

The archery competitions at the 2001 SEA Games took place from 11 to 15 September 2001 at the Bandaraya Square, Johor Bahru.

== Medalists ==
=== Medal table ===
Rank	Nation	Gold	Silver	Bronze	Total
1	Indonesia	2	1	1	4
2	Thailand	1	1	0	2
3	Philippines	1	0	0	1
4	Malaysia	0	2	0	2
5	Myanmar	0	0	3	3
Totals (5 entries)		4	4	4	12

=== Men ===
Event	Gold	Silver	Bronze
Individual	Prawit Poljundleed; Thailand	Kuswantoro; Indonesia	Nyi Nyi Tun; Myanmar
Team	Indonesia (INA); Kuswantoro; Lockneco; Syafrudin Mawi	Thailand (THA); Prawit Poljundleed; Patrinroj; Arkhom Pannoi	Myanmar (MYA); Nyi Nyi Tun; Yan Aung Soe; Win Win Zaw

=== Women ===
Event	Gold	Silver	Bronze
Individual	Marino Purita Joy; Philippines	Lim Geok Pong; Malaysia	Rusena Gelanteh; Indonesia
Team	Indonesia (INA); Rusenah Gelanteh; Gina Rahayu; Suci Dwi Megasari	Malaysia (MAS); Fairuz Hanisah; Anbarasi Subramaniam; Lim Geok Pong	Myanmar (MYA); Thin Thin Khing; Thi Thi Win; Myat Thu Zar Myint
