= Water polo at the 2001 SEA Games =

- Venue: National Aquatics Centre
- Dates: 11–15 September 2001

The water polo competitions at the 2001 Southeast Asian Games in Kuala Lumpur took place from 11 to 15 September 2001 at the National Aquatics Centre within the National Sports Complex. It was one of four aquatic sports at the Games, along with diving, swimming and synchronised swimming.

== Medalists ==
Event	Gold	Silver	Bronze
Men's team polo	Singapore	Thailand	Indonesia
