= Squash at the 2001 SEA Games =

- Venue: Bukit Dumbar Squash Centre, Penang
- Dates: 10–15 September 2001
- Competitors: 39 from 5 nations

Squash at the 2001 Southeast Asian Games was held in Bukit Dumbar Squash Centre, Penang, Malaysia from 10 to 16 September 2001 Squash had team, and individual events for men and women.

== Medalists ==
Event	Gold	Silver	Bronze
Men's team	Malaysia (MAS); Kenneth Low; Mohammad Azlan Iskandar; Yap Kok Four; Kelvin Ho	Singapore (SIN); Mohammad Rizal Kadir; Peter Hill; Dermadi Adi; Joel Ong	Thailand (THA); Chatchawin Tangjaitrong; Poowis Poonsiri; Apirom Na Nakorn; Loius Boonsinsukh
Men's team	Malaysia (MAS); Kenneth Low; Mohammad Azlan Iskandar; Yap Kok Four; Kelvin Ho	Singapore (SIN); Mohammad Rizal Kadir; Peter Hill; Dermadi Adi; Joel Ong	Philippines (PHI); Edgar Ballebar; Arnel Begornia; Ricky Espinola; Joboy Antipala
Women's team	Malaysia (MAS); Nicol David; Sharon Wee; Tricia Chuah; Sally Looi	Singapore (SIN); Della Lee; Joannah Yue; Serene Lee; Vicky He	Indonesia (INA); Juwita Rossaly Mokalu; Sri Utaminingsih; Fenny Louisa Mokalu; Diane Putri
Women's team	Malaysia (MAS); Nicol David; Sharon Wee; Tricia Chuah; Sally Looi	Singapore (SIN); Della Lee; Joannah Yue; Serene Lee; Vicky He	Thailand (THA); Jitra C. Sopahpen G. Sansanee T.
Men's individual	Mohammad Azlan Iskandar; Malaysia	Kenneth Low; Malaysia	Mohammad Rizal Kadir; Singapore
Men's individual	Mohammad Azlan Iskandar; Malaysia	Kenneth Low; Malaysia	Nuryanto; Indonesia
Women's individual	Nicol David; Malaysia	Sharon Wee; Malaysia	Della Lee; Singapore
Women's individual	Nicol David; Malaysia	Sharon Wee; Malaysia	Joannah Yue; Singapore

== Medal table ==
Legend

* Host nation (Malaysia)

Rank	Nation	Gold	Silver	Bronze	Total
1	Malaysia (MAS)*	4	2	0	6
2	Singapore (SIN)	0	2	3	5
3	Indonesia (INA)	0	0	2	2
3	Thailand (THA)	0	0	2	2
5	Philippines (PHI)	0	0	1	1
Totals (5 entries)		4	4	8	16
