= Raichin Antonov =

Bulgarian swimmer (born 1980)

Personal information
- Full name: Raichin Antonov
- National team: Bulgaria
- Born: 11 April 1980 (age 46) Sofia, Bulgaria
- Height: 1.96 m (6 ft 5 in)
- Weight: 82 kg (181 lb)

Sport
- Sport: Swimming
- Strokes: Freestyle
- Club: Slavia Sofia
- College team: Missouri State University (U.S.)
- Coach: Jack Steck (U.S.)

Raichin Antonov (Bulgarian: Райчин Антонов; born 11 April 1980) is a Bulgarian former swimmer, who specialized in sprint freestyle events. He is a multiple-time Bulgarian record holder and champion in the 50 and 100 m freestyle. He is also a former member of the swimming team for the Missouri State Bears under head coach Jack Steck, and a business graduate at the Missouri State University in Springfield, Missouri.

Antonov qualified for two swimming events at the 2004 Summer Olympics in Athens, by eclipsing FINA B-standard entry times of 23.48 (50 m freestyle) and 51.65 (100 m freestyle) from the Missouri State Swimming Championships. In the 100 m freestyle, Antonov challenged seven other swimmers on the fourth heat, including two-time Olympians George Gleason of the Virgin Islands and Allen Ong of Malaysia. He rounded out the field to last place and fifty-second overall by 0.29 of a second behind Ong in 52.33. In his second event, 50 m freestyle, Antonov matched his position from his first on the morning's prelims. Swimming in heat five, he touched out Iceland's Örn Arnarson to take a sixth spot by 0.17 of a second, outside his entry time of 23.67.
