= Karate at the 2001 SEA Games =

Karate competition

- Venue: UNITEN Bangi Hall, Selangor
- Dates: 9–11 September 2001

Karate at the 2001 Southeast Asian Games was held in UNITEN Bangi Hall, Selangor, Malaysia from 9 to 11 September 2001.

== Medalist ==
=== Kata ===
Event	Gold	Silver	Bronze
Men Individual Kata	Ku Jin Keat; Malaysia	Aswan Ali; Indonesia	Min Aye; Myanmar
Men Individual Kata	Ku Jin Keat; Malaysia	Aswan Ali; Indonesia	Abd Malik Mohd Zaini; Brunei
Men Team Kata	Malaysia (MAS)	Indonesia (INA)	Myanmar (MYA)
Men Team Kata	Malaysia (MAS)	Indonesia (INA)	Vietnam (VIE)
Women Individual Kata	Lim Lee Lee; Malaysia	Endah Jubaedah; Indonesia	Yanisa; Thailand
Women Individual Kata	Lim Lee Lee; Malaysia	Endah Jubaedah; Indonesia	Yin Hua Thawng; Myanmar
Women Team Kata	Malaysia (MAS)	Vietnam (VIE)	Myanmar (MYA)
Women Team Kata	Malaysia (MAS)	Vietnam (VIE)	Indonesia (INA)

=== Kumite ===
==== Men's Event ====
Event	Gold	Silver	Bronze
55kg	Puvaneswaran Ramasamy; Malaysia	Pham Tran Nguyen; Vietnam	Isfan Rahaisal Tanjung; Indonesia
55kg	Puvaneswaran Ramasamy; Malaysia	Pham Tran Nguyen; Vietnam	Eddie Jofriani Johari; Brunei
60kg	Arief Taufan Syamsuddin; Indonesia	Lim Yoke Wai; Malaysia	Mohammad Fadilah Sanif; Brunei
60kg	Arief Taufan Syamsuddin; Indonesia	Lim Yoke Wai; Malaysia	Nguyen Ngoc Long; Vietnam
65kg	M Hasan Basri; Indonesia	Kong Tai Moon; Malaysia	One Ko Ko Oo; Myanmar
65kg	M Hasan Basri; Indonesia	Kong Tai Moon; Malaysia	Nguyen Anh Tuan; Vietnam
70kg	Sonny Simangasing; Indonesia	Junel O Perania; Philippines	Lee Yung Siang Ken; Singapore
70kg	Sonny Simangasing; Indonesia	Junel O Perania; Philippines	R. Muniandy; Malaysia
75kg	Rayner Kin Siong; Malaysia	Le Hai Bang; Vietnam	Ryan Bonifacio FM; Philippines
75kg	Rayner Kin Siong; Malaysia	Le Hai Bang; Vietnam	Novilus Tedius Yoku; Indonesia
80kg	P. Thiagu; Malaysia	Saner Jaritrum; Thailand	Sudirman; Indonesia
80kg	P. Thiagu; Malaysia	Saner Jaritrum; Thailand	Tran Hai Ha; Vietnam
+80kg	Jose Mari P Pabillore; Philippines	Dam Sruan; Thailand	Mohd Umar Syarif D. Indonesia
+80kg	Jose Mari P Pabillore; Philippines	Dam Sruan; Thailand	Alexander a/l Arlantu; Malaysia
Open	Vu Quoc Huy; Vietnam	Robert Karly; Indonesia	Kong Tai Moon; Malaysia
Open	Vu Quoc Huy; Vietnam	Robert Karly; Indonesia	One Ko Ko Oo; Myanmar
Team Kumite	Indonesia (INA)	Vietnam (VIE)	Philippines (PHI)
Team Kumite	Indonesia (INA)	Vietnam (VIE)	Malaysia (MAS)

==== Women's Event ====
Event	Gold	Silver	Bronze
48kg	Pham Hong Tham; Vietnam	Ng Chai Lin; Malaysia	Maria Marna Pabillore; Philippines
48kg	Pham Hong Tham; Vietnam	Ng Chai Lin; Malaysia	Jenny Zeannet; Indonesia
53kg	M Srirajarajeswari; Malaysia	Vu Kim Anh; Vietnam	Maricar F Rimando; Philippines
53kg	M Srirajarajeswari; Malaysia	Vu Kim Anh; Vietnam	Sandra Aryani; Indonesia
60kg	S. Premila; Malaysia	Ni Ni Cho The; Myanmar	Vipavee Charagrang; Thailand
60kg	S. Premila; Malaysia	Ni Ni Cho The; Myanmar	Ha Thi Kieu Trang; Vietnam
+60kg	Gretchen S Malalad; Philippines	Meity Johana Kaseger; Indonesia	Agnes Tan Sze Ching; Malaysia
+60kg	Gretchen S Malalad; Philippines	Meity Johana Kaseger; Indonesia	Pham Hong Tham; Vietnam
Open	Nguyen Thi Thu Trang; Vietnam	Vipavee; Thailand	Christina Dewi Gani; Indonesia
Open	Nguyen Thi Thu Trang; Vietnam	Vipavee; Thailand	Ni Ni Cho The; Myanmar
Team Kumite	Vietnam (VIE)	Indonesia (INA)	Malaysia (MAS)
Team Kumite	Vietnam (VIE)	Indonesia (INA)	Philippines (PHI)

== Medal table ==
Legend

* Host nation (Malaysia)

Rank	Nation	Gold	Silver	Bronze	Total
1	Malaysia (MAS)*	9	3	6	18
2	Indonesia (INA)	4	6	8	18
3	Vietnam (VIE)	4	5	6	15
4	Philippines (PHI)	2	1	5	8
5	Thailand (THA)	0	3	2	5
6	Myanmar (MYA)	0	1	7	8
7	Brunei (BRU)	0	0	3	3
8	Singapore (SIN)	0	0	1	1
Totals (8 entries)		19	19	38	76
