= Titiya Plucksataporn =

Thai professional golfer (1982–2022)

Personal information
- Full name: Kanlayanee Plucksataporn
- Nickname: Tobby
- Nationality: Thailand
- Born: 24 December 1982 Bangkok, Thailand
- Died: 22 October 2022 (aged 39)

Career
- Sport: Golf
- Turned professional: 2005
- Former tours: Ladies European Tour; Ladies Asian Golf Tour; Taiwan LPGA Tour; China LPGA Tour
- Professional wins: 4

Number of wins by tour
- Ladies Asian Golf Tour: 1
- Other: 3

Best results in LPGA major championships
- Chevron Championship: DNP
- Women's PGA C'ship: DNP
- U.S. Women's Open: DNP
- Women's British Open: CUT: 2014, 2015
- Evian Championship: DNP
Medal record
Women's golf
Representing Thailand
SEA Games
Silver medal – second place	2001 Kuala Lumpur	Individual
Silver medal – second place	2001 Kuala Lumpur	Team

Titiya Plucksataporn (Thai: ธิติยา พฤกษ์สถาพร), later known as Kanlayanee Plucksataporn (Thai: กัลยาณี พฤกษ์สถาพร; 24 December 1982 – 22 October 2022), was a Thai professional golfer. She was a member of the Ladies European Tour for 14 years and won the 2013 TLPGA & Royal Open on the Ladies Asian Golf Tour. Before turning professional, she represented Thailand in international amateur competitions, including the Queen Sirikit Cup, the SEA Games and the Espirito Santo Trophy.

== Early life and amateur career ==
Plucksataporn was born in Bangkok, Thailand, on 24 December 1982. She took up golf at the age of 12 and was coached by her father, Tarat, who also often worked as her caddie. She joined the Thailand women's national golf team at the age of 16.

She represented Thailand in the Queen Sirikit Cup, the Asia-Pacific Amateur Ladies Golf Team Championship, in 2001, 2002 and 2005. In 2005, she finished second in the individual competition behind Yani Tseng.

At the 2001 SEA Games in Malaysia, Plucksataporn won two silver medals, finishing runner-up in the women's individual event behind Thailand teammate Onnarin Sattayabanphot and also earning silver in the women's team event. She was also a member of Thailand's team at the 2002 Espirito Santo Trophy, where Thailand finished second to Australia on a tiebreak. The Thailand team comprised Plucksataporn, Aree Song Wongluekiet and Naree Song Wongluekiet.

== Professional career ==
Plucksataporn turned professional in November 2005 and joined the Ladies European Tour in 2006, after having competed in the Thailand Ladies Open as an amateur. She was the first Thai golfer to play on the tour. By 2007, she had retained her tour card for the following season and qualified for the 2007 Honda LPGA Thailand at Siam Country Club Pattaya Old Course.

She won three professional events in Thailand before claiming her first international title at the 2013 TLPGA & Royal Open in Taiwan, the opening event of the Ladies Asian Golf Tour and Taiwan LPGA Tour. She recorded rounds of 69, 68 and 73 for a six-under-par total of 210, finishing one stroke ahead of Teresa Lu and earning NT$1.2 million.

On the Ladies European Tour, Plucksataporn made 186 starts and recorded 13 top-10 finishes. Her best results included a seventh-place finish at the 2015 Turkish Airlines Open and a tie for third at the 2013 Ladies Norwegian Challenge.

Plucksataporn also competed in major championship fields, including the Women's British Open in 2014 and 2015, missing the cut on both occasions. She also played on the China LPGA Tour, where her career-best finish was a tie for third.

She left the Ladies European Tour in December 2019 and later worked as a golf coach in Thailand.

== Death ==
Plucksataporn died from stomach cancer on 22 October 2022, at the age of 39.

== Professional wins (4) ==
=== Ladies Asian Golf Tour wins (1) ===
No.	Date	Tournament	Winning score	To par	Margin of victory	Runner-up
1	13 Jan 2013	TLPGA & Royal Open^{1}	69-68-73=210	−6	1 stroke	(Taiwan) Teresa Lu

^{1}Co-sanctioned by the Taiwan LPGA Tour.

=== Taiwan LPGA Tour wins (1) ===
No.	Date	Tournament	Winning score	To par	Margin of victory	Runner-up
1	13 Jan 2013	TLPGA & Royal Open^{1}	69-68-73=210	−6	1 stroke	(Taiwan) Teresa Lu

^{1}Co-sanctioned by the Ladies Asian Golf Tour.

=== Thai LPGA Tour wins (1) ===
- 2011 (1) 3rd SAT-Thai LPGA Championship

=== All Thailand Golf Tour / TPC Tour wins (2) ===
- 2007 (1) Singha Pattaya Open
- 2014 (1) Singha Pattaya Open

== Results in LPGA majors ==
Tournament	2014	2015
Women's British Open	CUT	CUT

The Women's British Open was the only major she played. CUT = missed the half-way cut

== Team appearances ==
Amateur

- Queen Sirikit Cup (representing Thailand): 2001, 2002, 2005
- SEA Games (representing Thailand): 2001
- Espirito Santo Trophy (representing Thailand): 2002
