= Wushu at the 2001 SEA Games =

- Venue: Penang International Sports Arena, Penang
- Dates: 9–11 September 2001

Wushu at the 2001 Southeast Asian Games was held in Penang International Sports Arena, Penang, Malaysia from 9 to 11 September 2001.

== Medal table ==
Legend

* Host nation (Malaysia)

Rank	Nation	Gold	Silver	Bronze	Total
1	Malaysia (MAS)*	6	2	5	13
2	Vietnam (VIE)	5	6	4	15
3	Philippines (PHI)	4	2	4	10
4	Myanmar (MYA)	3	2	4	9
5	Indonesia (INA)	2	5	3	10
6	Singapore (SIN)	1	2	1	4
7	Thailand (THA)	1	0	1	2
8	Laos (LAO)	0	0	1	1
Totals (8 entries)		22	19	23	64

== Medalists ==
=== Men's taolu ===
Event	Gold	Silver	Bronze
Changquan	Oh Poh Soon; Malaysia	Lim Kim; Malaysia; Leo Wen Yeow; Singapore	none awarded
Daoshu	Lim Kim; Malaysia	Seno Prakoso; Indonesia	Arvin Ting; Philippines
Jianshu	Oh Poh Soon; Malaysia; U Pyi Wai Hhyo; Myanmar	none awarded	Willy Wang; Philippines
Qiangshu	Oh Poh Soon; Malaysia; Willy Wang; Philippines	none awarded	Lim Yew Fai; Malaysia
Gunshu	Mark Robert Rosales; Philippines	Lim Kim; Malaysia	U Pyi Wai Phye; Myanmar
Nanquan	Ho Ro Bin; Malaysia	U Zan Zaw Moe; Myanmar	Lê Quang Huy; Vietnam
Nandao / Nangun	Ho Ro Bin; Malaysia	Trần Trọng Tuấn; Vietnam	Sandry Leong; Indonesia
Taijiquan / Taijijian	Goh Qiu Bin; Singapore	Nguyen Anhminh; Vietnam	Bobby Co; Philippines

=== Men's sanda ===
Event	Gold	Silver	Bronze
Sanshou (52 kg)	Calica Jearome; Philippines	Arif Harsoyo; Indonesia	Lim Chee Leong; Malaysia
Sanshou (52 kg)	Calica Jearome; Philippines	Arif Harsoyo; Indonesia	Tran Xuan Anh; Vietnam
Sanshou (56 kg)	Diep Bao Minh; Vietnam	Rexel Nganhayna; Philippines	Christian John; Indonesia
Sanshou (56 kg)	Diep Bao Minh; Vietnam	Rexel Nganhayna; Philippines	Rachan Chalieosil; Thailand
Sanshou (60 kg)	Sangio Marques; Philippines	Teguh Prastowo; Indonesia	Bernard Radin; Malaysia
Sanshou (60 kg)	Sangio Marques; Philippines	Teguh Prastowo; Indonesia	Vanxay Oudomphon; Laos
Sanshou (65 kg)	Ang Kan Chompupuong; Thailand	Phung Anh Tuan; Vietnam	Tan Lih Chuan; Malaysia
Sanshou (65 kg)	Ang Kan Chompupuong; Thailand	Phung Anh Tuan; Vietnam	U Htun Htun Oo; Myanmar

=== Women's talou ===
Event	Gold	Silver	Bronze
Changquan	Nguyễn Thúy Hiền; Vietnam	Nurdiana; Indonesia	Đàm Thanh Xuân; Vietnam
Daoshu	Nguyễn Thúy Hiền; Vietnam	Nurdiana; Indonesia	Susyana Tjhan; Indonesia
Jianshu	Sher Lie; Indonesia	Nguyễn Thị Mỹ Đức; Vietnam	Ma Wai Yi Maung; Myanmar
Qiangshu	Nguyễn Thúy Hiền; Vietnam	Nguyễn Thị Mỹ Đức; Vietnam	Leo Rui Yan; Singapore
Gunshu	Susyana Tjhan; Indonesia	Đàm Thanh Xuân; Vietnam	Daw Khing Zin Win; Myanmar
Nanquan	Ma Swe Swe Thant; Myanmar	Lily So; Philippines	Nguyễn Phương Lan; Vietnam
Nandao / Nangun	Nguyễn Phương Lan; Vietnam	Ma Swe Swe Thant; Myanmar	Lily So; Philippines
Taijiquan / Taijijian	Khaing Khaing Maw; Myanmar	Liew Yin Yin; Singapore	Wong Pei Ling; Malaysia
