= Rowing at the 2001 SEA Games =

- Venue: Batu Dam, Selangor
- Dates: 10–13 September 2001

Rowing at the 2001 SEA Games was held from September 10 to September 13. All events were held at the Batu Dam, Selangor, Malaysia.

== Medalists ==
=== Men ===
Event	Gold	Silver	Bronze
Single Scull	Lasmin; Indonesia	Tolentino Benjamin Jr; Philippines	Piyadanai Pantangthai; Thailand
Lightweight Double Scull	Indonesia (INA); Jamaluddin; Muhammad Anwar	Thailand (THA); Piyadanai Pantangthai; Poi Ruthtanaphol	Philippines (PHI); Maerina Edgardo Macabitas; Rodriguez Jose Turingan
Coxless Pair	Indonesia (INA); Agus Budy Aji; Iswandi	Philippines (PHI); Cordova Nestor; Regalado Harvey Vargas	Myanmar (MYA); Tha Tun; Naing Naing Htoo
Lightweight Coxless Four	Indonesia (INA); Jefraim Dododea; Aldino Maryandi; Rodiaman; Rahmat	Philippines (PHI); Maerina Edgardo Macabitas; Galvez Mark Anthony; Amposta Alvin Lopez; Rodriguez Jose Turingan	Myanmar (MYA); Thein Win; Phone Myint Tayzar; Aung Kyaw Moe; Zaw Lwin Tun

=== Women ===
Event	Gold	Silver	Bronze
Single Scull	Puttharaksa Nikree; Thailand	Pere Koroba; Indonesia	Foo Beng Li; Singapore
Lightweight Double Scull	Thailand (THA); Puttharaksa Nikree; Bussayamas Phaengkathok	Indonesia (INA); Weni; Enggelina Ohello	Myanmar (MYA); Chaw Su; Yin Yin Htwe
Coxless Pair	Indonesia (INA); Rita; Susilowati	Myanmar (MYA); San San Win; Yin Min Htay	Philippines (PHI); Babilonia Myla Tanada; Tolentino Josalyn Permejo
Lightweight Coxless Four	Myanmar (MYA); Naw Ah Le La She; Khin Mar Oo; Tin Tin Nwe; Myint Myint Win	Indonesia (INA); Yayan Nuryanti; Ulfiatun Nadiroh; Ismani Makkah; Ariyani	Thailand (THA); Phimpaka Thednum; Wannapa Srisukkho; Kanokwan Niyomtham; Wisutta Maensittirote

== Medal table ==
Legend

Rank	Nation	Gold	Silver	Bronze	Total
1	Indonesia	5	3	0	8
2	Thailand	2	1	2	5
3	Myanmar	1	1	3	5
4	Philippines	0	3	2	5
5	Singapore	0	0	1	1
Totals (5 entries)		8	8	8	24
