= Bonyx Yusak Saweho =

Indonesian boxer

Personal information
- Nationality: Indonesian
- Born: 11 November 1982 (age 43) Manado, Indonesia

Sport
- Sport: Boxing
Medal record
Men's boxing
Representing Indonesia
SEA Games
Gold medal – first place	2001 Kuala Lumpur	Pinweight

Bonyx Yusak Saweho (born 11 November 1982) is an Indonesian boxer. He competed in the men's flyweight event at the 2004 Summer Olympics.
