= Bah Chu Mei =

Malaysian international lawn bowler

Bah Chui Mei
Personal information
- Nationality: Malaysian
- Born: 27 August 1960 (age 65)
Medal record
Representing (Malaysia)
Asia Pacific Bowls Championships
Bronze medal – third place	2001 Melbourne	triples
Bronze medal – third place	2001 Melbourne	fours
Southeast Asian Games
Gold medal – first place	1999 Bandar Seri Begawan	fours
Gold medal – first place	2001 Kuala Lumpur	fours
Gold medal – first place	2005 Angeles City	pairs

Bah Chu Mei (born 27 August 1960) is a former Malaysian international lawn bowler.

== Bowls career ==
Bah Chu Mei has represented Malaysia at three Commonwealth Games; in the pairs event at the 1998 Commonwealth Games, the fours event at the 2002 Commonwealth Games and the pairs event at the 2006 Commonwealth Games.

She won two bronze medals at the 2001 Asia Pacific Bowls Championships, in Melbourne and won three gold medals at the Lawn bowls at the Southeast Asian Games.

After the 2006 Commonwealth Games she became a bowls coach.
