= Sia Wai Yen =

Malaysian swimmer

Personal information
- Full name: Sia Wai Yen
- National team: Malaysia
- Born: 15 January 1984 (age 42) Kuala Lumpur, Malaysia
- Height: 1.73 m (5 ft 8 in)
- Weight: 62 kg (137 lb)

Sport
- Sport: Swimming
- Strokes: Freestyle, medley
Medal record
Women's swimming
Representing Malaysia
Southeast Asian Games
Gold medal – first place	2001 Kuala Lumpur	400 m medley
Silver medal – second place	1999 Brunei	400 m medley
Bronze medal – third place	2001 Kuala Lumpur	400 m freestyle
Bronze medal – third place	2001 Kuala Lumpur	200 m medley

Sia Wai Yen (born 15 January 1984) is a Malaysian swimmer who specialised in long-distance freestyle and individual medley events. At the age of 16 she represented Malaysia at the 2000 Summer Olympics. She won four medals in two editions of the Southeast Asian Games (1999 and 2001), and later became a top 8 finalist at the 2002 Asian Games.

Sia competed in a medley double at the 2000 Summer Olympics in Sydney. She achieved FINA B-standards of 2:20.64 (200 m individual medley) and 4:52.52 (400 m individual medley) from the Southeast Asian Games in Bandar Seri Begawan, Brunei. On the first day of the Games she placed twenty-fifth in the 400 m individual medley. In heat four, she finished at the bottom of the pack in a poor time of 4:59.18, more than six seconds slower than her national record. Two days later, in the 200 m individual medley, Sia posted a time of 2:20.64 in heat two but finished in thirty-first place among 36 other swimmers from the prelims.

When her nation hosted the 2001 Southeast Asian Games in Kuala Lumpur, Sia won a gold in the 400 m individual medley (4:55.87), and a bronze in the 400 m freestyle (4:24.87) and 200 m individual medley (2:22.44).

At the 2002 Asian Games in Busan, South Korea, Sia finished seventh in the 400 m individual medley at 5:06.20, holding off a sprint freestyle race from Hong Kong's Chan Wing Suet by four-hundredths of a second (0.04).
