= Larry Semillano =

Filipino boxer

Personal information
- Nationality: Filipino
- Born: March 7, 1976 (age 50) Bago, Negros Occidental, Philippines

Sport
- Sport: Boxing
- Weight class: Lightweight, light welterweight
Medal record
Representing Philippines
Southeast Asian Games
Silver medal – second place	2007 Nakhon Ratchasima	Light welterweight
Bronze medal – third place	2001 Kuala Lumpur	Light Weight

Larry Semillano (born March 7, 1976) is a Filipino amateur boxer. He competed in the men's lightweight event at the 2000 Summer Olympics. Semillano also boxed for the Philippines at the Southeast Asian Games. He later worked as a boxing coach mentoring amateur boxing team of Bago.
