= Allen Ong =

Malaysian swimmer

Personal information
- Full name: Allen Ong Hou Ming
- National team: Malaysia
- Born: 2 November 1979 (age 46) Ipoh, Malaysia
- Height: 1.78 m (5 ft 10 in)
- Weight: 72 kg (159 lb)

Sport
- Sport: Swimming
- Strokes: Freestyle
- College team: University of Minnesota (U.S.)
- Coach: Kelly Kremer (U.S.)
Medal record
Men's swimming
Representing Malaysia
Southeast Asian Games
| Gold medal – first place | 2001 Kuala Lumpur | 100 m freestyle |
| Gold medal – first place | 2003 Hanoi | 100 m freestyle |
| Silver medal – second place | 1999 Brunei | 100 m freestyle |
| Silver medal – second place | 2003 Hanoi | 50 m freestyle |
| Bronze medal – third place | 2001 Kuala Lumpur | 50 m freestyle |

Allen Ong Hou Ming (born 2 November 1979) is a Malaysian former swimmer, who specialised in sprint freestyle events. He is a two-time Olympian (2000 and 2004), a double gold medalist in the 100 m freestyle at the Southeast Asian Games (2001 and 2003), and a varsity swimmer for the Minnesota Golden Gophers at the University of Minnesota in Minneapolis.

Ong made his official debut at the 2000 Summer Olympics in Sydney. He failed to advance into the semifinals in any of his individual events, finishing fortieth in the 100 m freestyle (51.93), and thirty-seventh in the 200 m freestyle (1:54.53). He also placed twenty-second, as a member of the Malaysian team, in the 4 × 100 m medley relay (3:48.32).

Two years later, Ong blasted a Malaysian record of 23.62 to pick up a seventh seed in the 50 m freestyle at the 2002 Asian Games in Busan, South Korea.

At the 2004 Summer Olympics in Athens, Ong shortened his program, swimming only in two individual events. He cleared FINA B-standard entry times of 23.49 (50 m freestyle) from the Malaysian Open Championships in Kuala Lumpur, and 51.57 (100 m freestyle) from the Southeast Asian Games in Hanoi, Vietnam. In the 100 m freestyle, Ong challenged seven other swimmers in heat four, including fellow two-time Olympians Alexandros Aresti of Cyprus and George Gleason of the Virgin Islands. He edged out Bulgaria's Raichin Antonov to take a seventh spot and fiftieth overall by 0.29 of a second, outside his record time of 52.04. In his second event, 50 m freestyle, Ong matched his forty-sixth place tie with SEA Games champion Arwut Chinnapasaen on the morning's preliminaries. Swimming in heat five, he managed to pull off a fifth-place effort in 23.52, just 0.03 of a second off his entry time.
