= Bukit Kiara Sports Complex =

Sports venue in Kuala Lumpur, Malaysia

Coordinates: 3.140559°N 101.645497°E

The Bukit Kiara Sports Complex (Malay: Kompleks Sukan Bukit Kiara) is the main sports complex in Bukit Kiara, Kuala Lumpur, Malaysia. Owned by Perbadanan Stadium Malaysia, the complex was built for the 1998 Commonwealth Games.

Juara Stadium and the National Lawn Bowls Centre form part of the sports complex.

== History ==
In mid-2024, Juara Stadium underwent a renovation process, the first since the stadium opened, which included changing parts of the floor due to damage from termites.

== See also ==
- KL Sports City
