= 2001 SEA Games =

Multi-sport event in Malaysia

XXI Southeast Asian Games
- Host city: Kuala Lumpur, Malaysia
- Motto: Let's Make It the Best
- Nations: 10
- Athletes: 4165
- Events: 391 in 32 sports
- Opening: 8 September 2001
- Closing: 17 September 2001
- Opened by: Salahuddin; Yang di-Pertuan Agong
- Athlete's Oath: Noraseela Mohd Khalid
- Torch lighter: Daud Ibrahim
- Ceremony venue: Bukit Jalil National Stadium
- Website: 2001 Southeast Asian Games

The 2001 Southeast Asian Games (Malay: Sukan Asia Tenggara 2001), officially known as the 21st Southeast Asian Games, were a Southeast Asian multi-sport event held in Kuala Lumpur, Malaysia. This was the fifth time that Malaysia plays as SEA Games hosts, the country previously held the event in 1965, 1971, 1977, and 1989, all of which were staged in Kuala Lumpur.

Held from 8 to 17 September 2001 (although several events had commenced from 1 September 2001), these were the first SEA Games to have taken place in the new millennium. Around 4,165 athletes have participated at the Kuala Lumpur Games, which featured 391 events in 32 sports. It was opened by Salahuddin, the King of Malaysia at the Bukit Jalil National Stadium. The fifth day of the games commemorated a moment of silence on the September 11 attacks took place in the United States.

The final medal tally was led by host Malaysia, followed by Thailand and Indonesia. Several Games and National Records were broken during the games. The games were deemed generally successful with the rising standard of competition amongst the Southeast Asian nations.

== Development and preparation ==
The Kuala Lumpur 21st SEA Games Organizing Committee (KULSOC) was formed to oversee the staging of the event.

Steering Committee members of the Games
Position	Name	Designation
Chairman	Mr Hishamuddin Hussein	Minister, Ministry of Youth and Sports
Vice Chairman	Mr Tunku Muda Serting Imran	President, Olympic Council of Malaysia
Members	Mr Mahamad Zabri Min	Secretary General, Ministry of Youth and Sports Secretary
Members	Mr Mohd Zahidi Hj. Zainuddin	Chief, Armed Forces
Members	Mr Samsudin Hitam	Secretary General, Ministry of Finance
Members	Mr Mohamad Taha Ariff	Director General of Health
Members	Mr Kamaruzzaman	Mayor, City of Kuala Lumpur
Members	Mr Aseh Hj. Che Mat	Secretary General, Ministry of Home Affairs
Members	Mr Arshad Hashim	Secretary General, Ministry of Information
Members	Mr Tengku Alaudin Tengku Abd. Majid	Secretary General, Ministry of Youth and Sports
Members	Mr Mohmad Shaid Mohd. Taufek	Senior Deputy Secretary General, Prime Minister Department
Members	Mr Mohd. Shahar Sidek	Director General, Road Transport Department
Members	Mr Wira Mazlan Ahmad	Director General, National Sports Council

2001 Southeast Asian Games host states

=== Venues ===
The 2001 Southeast Asian Games used a mix of new, existing and temporary venues. Most venues were pre-existing public-sporting facilities which were reverted to public use after the games. No major retrofitting work were done in most venues as most had been used to host major multi-disciplinary events such as the 1998 Commonwealth Games.

At the centrepiece of the activities was the Bukit Jalil National Sports Complex. Incorporating the new 87,411-seat national stadium, it hosted most of the events.

A games village was not built. Instead, a "village in the city" concept saw athletes and officials housed in hotels across Peninsular Malaysia. Besides being physically near to the sport venues, it was hoped that it will add vibe to all the states and reduce post-games costs in converting a dedicated games village to other uses.

The 21st Southeast Asian Games had 39 venues for the games. 19 in Kuala Lumpur, 10 in Selangor, 4 in Johor and 3 each in Negeri Sembilan and Penang respectively.

State	Competition Venue	Sports
Kuala Lumpur	National Sports Complex
Kuala Lumpur	Bukit Jalil National Stadium	Opening and closing ceremonies, Athletics (Track and Field)
Kuala Lumpur	National Aquatic Centre	Aquatics (Diving, Swimming, Synchronised swimming)
Kuala Lumpur	Gymnasium I, Bukit Jalil	Billiards and snooker
Kuala Lumpur	Putra Indoor Stadium	Gymnastics
Kuala Lumpur	Malaysia National Hockey Stadium	Hockey
Kuala Lumpur	Bukit Kiara Sports Complex
Kuala Lumpur	Juara Stadium	Netball
Kuala Lumpur	National Lawn bowls Centre	Lawn bowls
Kuala Lumpur	Other
Kuala Lumpur	National Sports Council Sports Complex, Taman Keramat	Petanque
Kuala Lumpur	Kuala Lumpur City Hall Swimming Complex	Aquatics (Water polo)
Kuala Lumpur	Kuala Lumpur Velodrome	Cycling (Track cycling)
Kuala Lumpur	Titiwangsa Stadium	Sepak takraw
Kuala Lumpur	Malaysia Basketball Association Stadium	Basketball
Kuala Lumpur	Kuala Lumpur Badminton Stadium	Volleyball (Indoor)
Kuala Lumpur	Malaysian Public Works Department headquarters	Fencing
Kuala Lumpur	Tenaga National Sports Complex	Table tennis
Kuala Lumpur	Merdeka Square	Athletics (Marathon)
Kuala Lumpur	Titiwangsa Lake Gardens	Athletics (Racewalking)
Kuala Lumpur	National Tennis Centre, Jalan Duta	Tennis
Kuala Lumpur	KLFA Stadium	Football (women)
Selangor	Malawati Stadium	Badminton
Selangor	Sungai Buloh Rubber Research Institute of Malaysia	Cycling (Mountain biking)
Selangor	Petaling Jaya City Council Stadium	Football (men)
Selangor	Selangor Turf Club	Equestrian (Show jumping, Dressage)
Selangor	Universiti Putra Malaysia	Equestrian (Cross-country equestrianism)
Selangor	Kuala Lumpur International Airport, Sungai Labu Estate	Equestrian (Endurance)
Selangor	Sungai Long Golf and Country Club	Golf
Selangor	Universiti Tenaga Nasional	Karate
Selangor	PMKM Shooting Range	Shooting
Selangor	Batu Dam	Rowing
Johor	Taman Johor Jaya Multi-Purpose Hall	Weightlifting (competition)
Johor	Tan Sri Dato' Haji Hassan Yunos Stadium	Weightlifting (training)
Johor	Dataran Bandaraya Johor Bahru	Archery
Johor	Pasir Gudang Municipal Council Indoor Stadium	Pencak silat
Negeri Sembilan	Bandar Baru Nilai	Cycling (Mass start, Individual time trial)
Negeri Sembilan	Admiral Marina and Leisure Club, Port Dickson	Sailing
Negeri Sembilan	Paroi Centre Club Sports Centre	Boxing
Penang	Mega Lanes Bowling Centre, Prai	Bowling
Penang	Bukit Dumbar Squash Centre	Squash
Penang	Penang International Sports Arena	Wushu, Judo

=== Torch relay ===
The 21st SEA Games torch relay ran from 10 March 2001 to 8 September 2001, covering a distance of 7,884 km. The run began in Labuan followed by Sabah and Sarawak. In the peninsula, it started in Langkawi and passed through 12 states before it ended in Kuala Lumpur. The last leg of the run covered approximately 15 km, from Merdeka Square to Bukit Jalil National Stadium.

2001 Southeast Asian Games torch relay route.

10–11 March
1.Labuan
12–23 March
2.Sabah
24 March–April 4
3.Sarawak
4–6 April
4.Kedah (Langkawi)
7–11 April
5.Perlis

12–23 April
6.Kedah (Mainland)
24 April–May 6
7.Penang
7–24 May
8.Perak
25 May–June 8
9.Kelantan
9–23 June
10.Terengganu

24 June–July 9
11.Pahang
10–26 July
12.Johor
27–31 July
13.Malacca
1–7 August
14.Negeri Sembilan
8–26 August
15.Selangor
27 August–September 7
16.Kuala Lumpur (host city)

== Marketing ==
=== Logo and mascot ===
Si Tumas, the squirrel, the official mascot

The official logo for the games is an interpretation of a flame. In stylising the "flame" for the logo's design, its tongues have been individually separated and simplified. The logo's weaving formation conveys unity, and a coming together of Southeast Asia's best athletes. Its "weaving" also gives an opportunity to form the Roman numeral XXI, representing the 21st century, as well as having the Kuala Lumpur Games being the 21st edition of the SEA Games.

The mascot of the 2001 SEA Games is a squirrel named Si Tumas, a short form for Tupai Emas (Golden squirrel). In addition, the Si is phonetically similar to SEA as in SEA Games, and it is also a friendly form of address in Malay.

=== Songs ===
The theme song of the games is "In Glory We Celebrate (The SEA Games - 2001)", composed by Helen Yap from Magic Nova Productions with lyrics written in English by Tom Leng and lyrics written in Malay by Loloq, and was sung by Lynn Ali. A campaign song of the games was composed by Jaafar Abdul Rahman Idris with lyrics written by Dato Mokhzani Ismail and was sung by Adibah Noor.

=== Sponsors ===
A total of 26 sponsors, comprising 4 official partners, 8 main sponsors and 14 official sponsors, sponsored the games.

Official partners

- Petronas
- Telekom Malaysia
- Tenaga Nasional
- PROTON Holdings

Main sponsors

- Antioni
- Milo
- Coca-Cola
- Spritzer
- Genting Group
- Bata Shoes
- Syarikat Supreme Landmark & Wireless Corp. Sdn. Berhad
- Galaxy Automation Sdn. Berhad

Official sponsors

- Fraser and Neave
- Nestlé Cereals
- Lion Corporation
- Nikon
- Kodak
- Asia Pacific Sports
- Mesuma Sports Sdn Bhd
- FBT
- Royal Selangor
- Siemens
- Fujitsu
- Stanson
- Consolidated Farms
- Malaysia Airlines

== The games ==
=== Closing ceremony ===
The closing ceremony took place on 17 September 2001 in a rainy night with the theme: ASEAN, a time to celebrate (ASEAN: Masa untuk merayakan). It was attended by 100,000 audiences who managed to get into the stadium and take their seats. The ceremony begins with the performance of local celebrities including Erra Fazira and Ziana Zain.

After that, a group of paratroopers descended on the field of the stadium with the flags of the 10 participating nations of the games accompanied with the song "Jalur Gemilang" performed by a choir group. The athletes of the participating nations then paraded into the stadium by order of sports competed at the games and received warm welcome by the audience in the stadium. The order began with the aquatics, followed by archery, athletics and other sports.

The ceremony then continues with the performance of "Citrawarna Malaysia', performed by 300 dancers and 50 drum players that rocks the stadium with the rhythmic beat that reflects the diversity of the song rhythm and the traditional dances of the multi-racial society in Malaysia. Later, Mohd Qabil Ambak Mahamad Fathil, the Malaysian Equestrian rider was declared the Best Sportsman of the games, while the Thai Athletics sprinter Supavadee Khawpeag was declared the Best Sportswoman of the games.

After Prime minister Mahathir Mohammad declared the games closed, the Southeast Asian Games Federation flag was lowered and the flame of the cauldron was extinguished. The president of the Southeast Asian Games Federation and the president of the Olympic Council of Malaysia, Tan Sri Tunku Muda Serting Imran then handed over the games flag and the baton to the president of the Vietnam Olympic Committee and the Minister of Sports, Nguyen Danh Thai, a symbol of the SEA Games responsibilities being officially handed over to Vietnam, host of the 2003 Southeast Asian Games. The national anthem of Vietnam was played as the National Flag of Vietnam was raised. After that, an 11-minute Vietnam segment performance titled "Welcome to Vietnam" was performed by Vietnamese female dancers carrying a giant red flag with them. The performance was divided into three parts. The ceremony concludes with a Malaysian farewell segment performance in which the firework simultaneously released into the sky with 21 mountaineers fall from the roof using the ropes attached to them and distribute gifts to some lucky audiences while the balloons and colourful papers were spread into the air. A special concert was then held by popular artistes like Siti Nurhaliza, Erra Fazira, Sheila Majid and Amy of Search.

=== Participating nations ===
- Brunei (147)
- Cambodia (92)
- Indonesia (593)
- Laos (134)
- Malaysia (673) (Host)
- Myanmar (359)
- Philippines (542)
- Singapore (497)
- Thailand (697)
- Vietnam (431)

=== Sports ===
- Aquatics
  - Diving (8)
  - Swimming (32)
  - Synchronized swimming (2)
  - Water polo (1)
- Archery (4)
- Athletics (46)
- Badminton (7)
- Basketball (2)
- Billiards and snooker
- Bowling (12)
- Boxing (11)
- Cue sports (10)
- Cycling (20)
- Equestrian (7)
- Fencing (5)
- Football (2)
- Golf (4)
- Gymnastics (20)
- Hockey (2)
- Judo (14)
- Karate (19)
- Lawn bowls (6)
- Netball (1)
- Pencak silat (21)
- Pétanque (6)
- Rowing (8)
- Sailing (13)
- Sepak takraw (3)
- Shooting (36)
- Squash (4)
- Table tennis (7)
- Taekwondo (16)
- Tennis (7)
- Volleyball (2)
- Weightlifting (13)
- Wushu (20)

=== Calendar ===
OC	Opening ceremony	●	Event competitions	1	Gold medal events	CC	Closing ceremony

September	1 Sat	2 Sun	3 Mon	4 Tue	5 Wed	6 Thu	7 Fri	8 Sat	9 Sun	10 Mon	11 Tue	12 Wed	13 Thu	14 Fri	15 Sat	16 Sun	17 Mon	Events
Ceremonies								OC									CC	—N/a
Archery											●	●		2	2			4
Athletics												10	12	12	12			46
Badminton									●	●	2	●	●	●	5			7
Basketball									●	●	●	●	●	●	●	2		2
Billiards & snooker									2	1	1	2	1	1	1	1		10
Bowling										2	2	2	2	●	4			12
Boxing									●	●	●		●	●		11		11
Cycling									2	4	6	2	●	2	2	2		20
Diving														4	4			8
Equestrian								1	●	1	1	1		1	●	●	2	7
Fencing										2	2	1						5
Field hockey										●	●	●	●	●	1	1		2
Football	●	●	●	●	●	●	●		●	●	●	●	●	1	1			2
Golf										●	●	●	2		●	2		4
Gymnastics								2	2	●		10		●	●	6		20
Judo													5	5	4			14
Karate									6	7	6							19
Lawn bowls												●	●	●	2	4		6
Netball										●	●	●		1				1
Pencak silat											●	3	8	10				21
Pétanque												2	●	2	2			6
Rowing										●	4	●	4					8
Sailing									1	4	●	4		●	4			13
Sepaktakraw									●	●	●	1	●	●	2			3
Shooting								10	4	4	4	4	4	6				36
Squash										●	●	2	●	●	2			4
Swimming									6	7	6	6	7					32
Synchronised swimming																1	1	2
Table tennis									●	●	2		●	2	1	2		7
Taekwondo									7	5	4							16
Tennis									●	●	●	2		●	2	3		7
Volleyball									●	●	●	●	●	●	●	2		2
Water polo											●	●	●	●	1			1
Weightlifting											3	3	3	4				13
Wushu									●	●	20							20
Daily medal events	0	0	0	0	0	0	0	13	30	37	63	55	48	53	52	37	3	391
Cumulative total	0	0	0	0	0	0	0	13	43	80	143	198	246	299	351	388	391	391
September	1 Sat	2 Sun	3 Mon	4 Tue	5 Wed	6 Thu	7 Fri	8 Sat	9 Sun	10 Mon	11 Tue	12 Wed	13 Thu	14 Fri	15 Sat	16 Sun	17 Mon	Total events

=== Medal table ===
A total of 1280 medals comprising 392 gold medals, 390 silver medals and 498 bronze medals were awarded to athletes. The Host Malaysia's performance was their best ever yet in Southeast Asian Games History and emerged as overall champion of the games.

Key

* Host nation (Malaysia)

Rank	Nation	Gold	Silver	Bronze	Total
1	Malaysia*	111	75	85	271
2	Thailand	103	86	89	278
3	Indonesia	72	74	80	226
4	Vietnam	33	35	64	132
5	Philippines	30	66	67	163
6	Singapore	22	31	42	95
7	Myanmar	19	14	53	86
8	Laos	1	3	7	11
9	Cambodia	1	1	5	7
10	Brunei	0	5	6	11
Totals (10 entries)		392	390	498	1,280

== Broadcasting ==
During the Games, 32 sports events were broadcast live. The host broadcast activities were provided by Radio Televisyen Malaysia.

Key

* Host nation (Malaysia)

2001 SEA Games Broadcasters rights in Southeast Asia
IOC Code	Country	Broadcast network	Television network	Radio network
BRU	Brunei	Radio Televisyen Brunei; Kristal-Astro	Perkhidmatan Televisyen Brunei	
CAM	Cambodia	Radio and Television of Cambodia	Television of Cambodia	Radio of Cambodia
INA	Indonesia	RCTI	RCTI	
LAO	Laos	Laos National Radio and Television	Lao National Television	Lao National Radio
MAS	Malaysia*	Radio Televisyen Malaysia (RTM); Sistem Televisyen Malaysia Berhad (STMB); ASTRO	TV1; TV2; TV3; Astro SuperSport	Radio Malaysia Saluran 1 (Radio 1); Radio Malaysia Saluran Muzik (Radio Muzik); Radio Malaysia Kuala Lumpur; Radio Malaysia Saluran 4 (Radio 4)
MYA	Myanmar	Myanmar Radio and Television	MRTV	Myanmar Radio
PHI	Philippines	National Broadcasting Network	NBN	
SGP	Singapore	Mediacorp	CityTV	
THA	Thailand	Television Pool of Thailand (TPT)	BEC-TV Channel 3 Royal Thai Army Channel 5 BBTV Channel 7 Thai Color Television Channel 9 TVT11	Radio Thailand
VIE	Vietnam	VTV	VTV2 VTV3 HTV7	Voice of Vietnam

== See also ==
- 2001 ASEAN Para Games

Preceded by Bandar Seri Begawan	Southeast Asian Games; Kuala Lumpur; XXI Southeast Asian Games (2001)	Succeeded by Hanoi–Ho Chi Minh City
