= KL Sports City =

Sports complex in Malaysia

- Bandaraya Sukan Kuala Lumpur

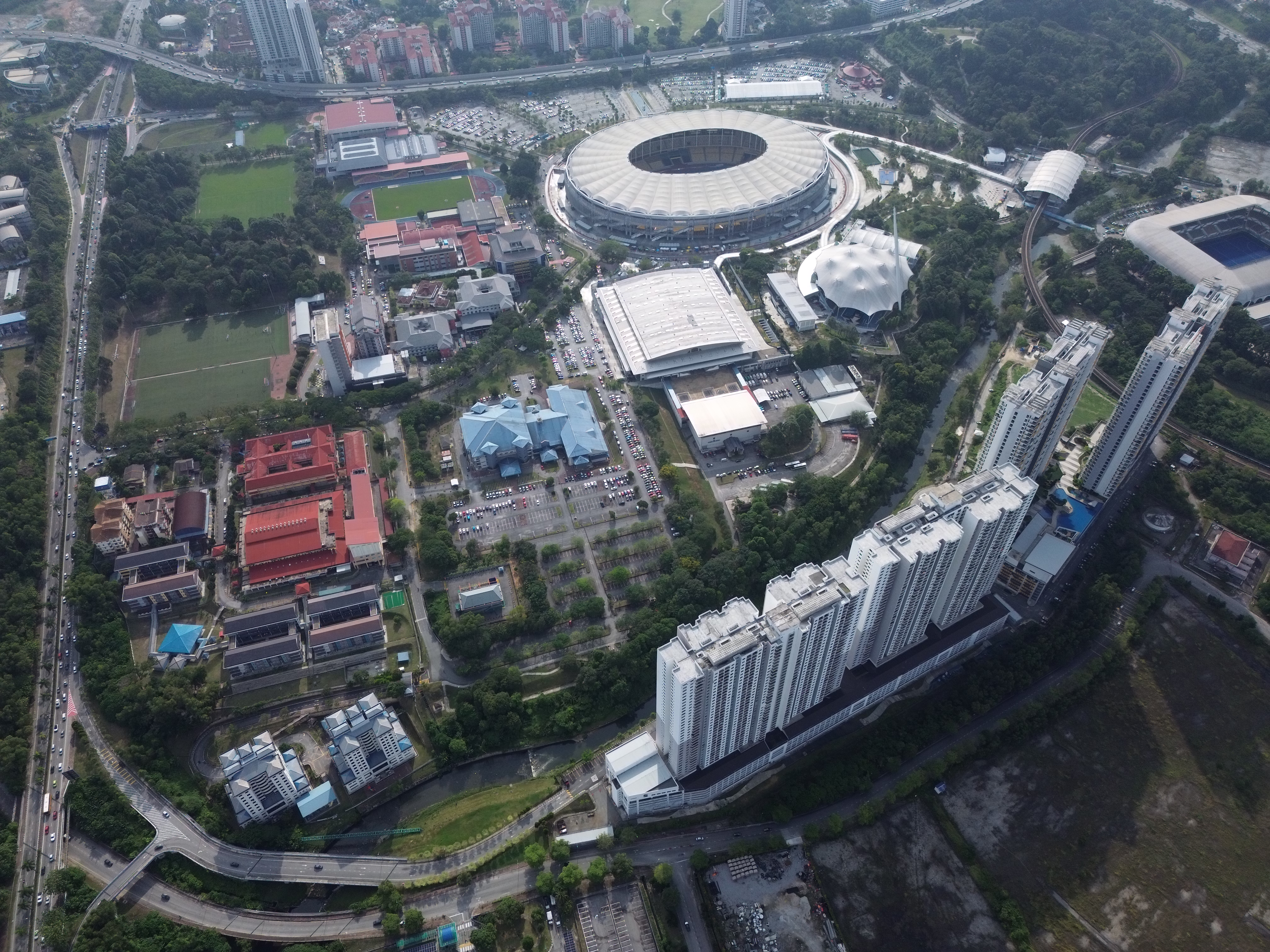
- Interactive map of KL Sports City
- Location: Bukit Jalil, Kuala Lumpur, Malaysia
- Coordinates: 3°3′16.8″N 101°41′28.2″E
- Owner: Malaysian Government
- Main venue: Bukit Jalil National Stadium; Capacity: 87,411
- Public transit: SP17 Bukit Jalil LRT station

Construction
- Groundbreaking: 1 January 1992
- Built: 1 January 1995
- Opened: 11 July 1998; 28 years ago
- Renovated: 1 January 1996; 2017
- Expanded: 1 January 1998; 2017
- Architects: Weidleplan Consulting GMBH, Stuttgart, Germany; Populous

The KL Sports City (formerly known as Bukit Jalil National Sports Complex; Kompleks Sukan Negara in Malay) in Malaysia is the largest sports complex in the country. It is located in Bukit Jalil, 20 km south of Kuala Lumpur. Described as the "sports complex in a park", it was the only one of its kind in the country or region when it was fully developed. It was officially inaugurated by the then-Prime Minister of Malaysia Mahathir Mohamad on 11 July 1998 ahead of the 1998 Commonwealth Games in which it staged the Games' opening ceremony. The complex was upgraded to KL Sports City in 2017 for the 2017 Southeast Asian Games.

== Access ==
The complex is accessible via Shah Alam Expressway, Puchong–Sungai Besi Highway, Maju Expressway and Kuala Lumpur–Seremban Expressway. It is also served by the Bukit Jalil LRT station on the LRT Sri Petaling Line.

== Features ==
- A main arch to the National Stadium with pool fountains
- A keris, Malay dagger at the entrance of National Stadium which symbolizes the warrior spirit of sportsmanship.

== List of structures and amenities ==
=== Stadiums ===
National Aquatic Centre

- TM National Stadium (formerly Bukit Jalil National Stadium)
- Unifi Arena (formerly Putra Indoor Stadium)
- National Hockey Stadium
- National Aquatic Centre
- National Squash Centre

=== Parks ===
- Bukit Komanwel (Commonwealth Hill)
- Family Park
- Bukit Jalil Golf and Country Club

=== Miscellaneous ===
National Sports Council Headquarters

- National Sports Council Headquarters and Complex
- Bukit Jalil Sports School
- Bukit Jalil LRT station
- Vista Komanwel (formerly used as 1998 Commonwealth Games village)
- Vista Komanwel Shopping Centre

== Notable events ==
- 2017 - 2017 ASEAN Para Games
- 2017 - 2017 Southeast Asian Games
- 2011 - Liverpool F.C. Asia Tour 2011
- 2011 - Chelsea 2011 summer tour of Asia
- 2011 - Arsenal 2011 Pre-Season Tour
- 2010 - 2010 AFF Suzuki Cup First Leg of the Finals
- 2009–present - ATP World Tour 250 Malaysian Open (tennis)
- 2009 - 2009 ASEAN Para Games
- 2009 - Manchester United Asia Tour 2009
- 2007 - 2007 Asian Cup
- 2007 - Champions Youth Cup 2007
- 2006 - 2006 FESPIC Games
- 2003 - FA Premier League Asia Cup 2003
- 2001 - 2001 ASEAN Para Games
- 2001 - 2001 Southeast Asian Games
- 2001 - Manchester United Asia Tour 2001
- 1998–present - Malaysia Cup Final
- 1998–present - Malaysian FA Cup Final
- 1998 - XVI Commonwealth Games, Kuala Lumpur

== See also ==
- Bukit Kiara Sports Complex
- Stadium Merdeka
- Stadium Negara
