= Archery at the SEA Games =

Archery is a Southeast Asian Games event and has been one of the sports held at the Games since the 1977 edition in Kuala Lumpur.

== Summary ==
| Games | Year | Host City | Events | Best nation |
|---|---|---|---|---|
| IX | 1977 | (Malaysia) Kuala Lumpur | 12 | Philippines |
| X | 1979 | (Indonesia) Jakarta | 7 | Indonesia |
| XI | 1981 | (Philippines) Manila | 7 | Indonesia |
| XII | 1983 | Singapore | 12 | Indonesia |
| XIII | 1985 | (Thailand) Bangkok | 12 | Indonesia |
| XIV | 1987 | (Indonesia) Jakarta | 13 | Indonesia |
| XV | 1989 | (Malaysia) Kuala Lumpur | 4 | Indonesia |
| XVI | 1991 | (Philippines) Manila | 4 | Indonesia |
| XVII | 1993 | Singapore | 4 | Indonesia |
| XVIII | 1995 | (Thailand) Chiang Mai | 4 | Indonesia |
| XIX | 1997 | (Indonesia) Jakarta | 4 | Philippines |
| XX | 1999 | (Brunei) Bandar Seri Begawan | no competition | |

| Games | Year | Host City | Events | Best nation |
|---|---|---|---|---|
| XXI | 2001 | (Malaysia) Kuala Lumpur | 4 | Indonesia |
| XXII | 2003 | (Vietnam) Hanoi–Ho Chi Minh City | 4 | Malaysia |
| XXIII | 2005 | (Philippines) Manila | 8 | Philippines |
| XXIV | 2007 | (Thailand) Nakhon Ratchasima | 8 | Indonesia |
| XXV | 2009 | (Laos) Vientiane | 8 | Indonesia |
| XXVI | 2011 | (Indonesia) Jakarta–Palembang | 10 | Indonesia |
| XXVII | 2013 | (Myanmar) Naypyidaw | 10 | Malaysia |
| XXVIII | 2015 | Singapore | 10 | Malaysia |
| XXIX | 2017 | (Malaysia) Kuala Lumpur | 10 | Malaysia |
| XXX | 2019 | (Philippines) Manila | 10 | Vietnam |
| XXXI | 2021 | (Vietnam) Hanoi | 10 | Indonesia |

== Competition ==
From 1977 to 1987, archery awarded a total of 12 gold medals, with each distance awarded an individual medal together with the overall individual and team award. The competition was based on the Single FITA round.

From 1979 to 1991, the Double FITA format was used.

From 1989, the gold medals awarded were reduced to 4, with one each for men's individual, men's team, women's individual and women's team event.

From 2005, the compound archery event was introduced, increasing the number of medals to 8.

From 2011, the mixed team event was introduced.

The current format of individual elimination rounds only allows the top two archers from each nation to enter. Therefore, for example, if three archers from the same nation top the rankings from 1 to 3, only archers 1 and 2 are allowed to enter the knockout rounds.

== Medal summary ==
=== Men's event ===
==== Recurve ====
===== Individual recurve =====
| Games | Gold | Silver | Bronze |
|---|---|---|---|
| 1977 Kuala Lumpur | (Indonesia) Donald Pandiangan (1228) | (Philippines) Santos Carlos Jr. (1227) | (Malaysia) Cheng Jun (1215) |
| 1979 Jakarta | (Indonesia) Donald Pandiangan (2508) | (Philippines) Santos Carlos Jr. (2421) | (Thailand) Banchong Dosanee (2379) |
| 1981 Manila | (Indonesia) Donald Pandiangan (2495) | (Philippines) Carlos Santos (2439) | (Thailand) Banchong Dosanee (2404) |
| 1983 Singapore | (Indonesia) Donald Pandiangan (2496) | (Indonesia) Suradi Rikimin (2465) | (Indonesia) Tatang Ferry Budiman (2421) |
| 1985 Bangkok | (Indonesia) Adang Adjidji (2484) | (Indonesia) Suradi Rikimin (2482) | (Thailand) Sununt Tokahuta (2439) |
| 1987 Jakarta | (Indonesia) Adang Adjidji (2472) | (Indonesia) Donald Pandiangan (2432) | (Thailand) Amphol Amalakajorn (2430) |
| 1989 Kuala Lumpur | (Indonesia) Syafrudin Mawi (2506) | (Indonesia) Hariyono (2481) | (Indonesia) Muhamad Tohir (2441) |
| 1991 Manila | (Indonesia) Syafruddin Mawi (2501) | (Indonesia) Amin Hendra Setijawan (2498) | (Philippines) Michael Focundo (2422) |
| 1993 Singapore | (Indonesia) Hendra Setijawan | (Philippines) Clint Sayo | (Thailand) Boonsom Jarat |
| 1995 Chiang Mai | (Philippines) Clint Sayo | (Indonesia) Hendra Setyawan | (Indonesia) Ditto Rembran |
| 1997 Jakarta | (Indonesia) Syafrudin Mawi | (Indonesia) Wahyu Hidyat | (Philippines) Christian Cubilla |
| 2001 Kuala Lumpur | Prawit Poljungleed (THA) | Kuswantoro (INA) | Nyi Nyi Tun (MYA) |
| 2003 Hanoi–Ho Chi Minh City | Muhammad Marbawi (MAS) | Loh Wen Liang (SIN) | Florente Matan (PHI) |
| 2005 Manila | Zaw Win Htike (MYA) | Wan Khalmizam (MAS) | Marvin Cordero (PHI) |
| 2007 Nakhon Ratchasima | Cheng Chu Sian (MAS) | Wan Khalmizam (MAS) | Sulistyawan Rahmat (INA) |
| 2009 Vientiane | Cheng Chu Sian (MAS) | Zaw Win Htike (MYA) | Arif Farhan Ibrahim Putra (MAS) |
| 2011 Jakarta–Palembang | Cheng Chu Sian (MAS) | Khairul Anuar Mohamad (MAS) | Witthaya Thamwong (THA) |
| 2013 Naypyidaw | Khairul Anuar Mohamad (MAS) | Atiq Bazil Bakri (MAS) | Witthaya Thamwong (THA) |
| 2015 Singapore | Witthaya Thamwong (THA) | Haziq Kamaruddin (MAS) | Tan Si Lie (SIN) |
| 2017 Kuala Lumpur | Chu Đức Anh (VIE) | Khairul Anuar Mohamad (MAS) | Witthaya Thamwong (THA) |
| 2019 Philippines | Hendra Purnama (INA) | Htike Lin Oo (MYA) | Riau Ega Agatha (INA) |
| 2021 Vietnam | Arif Dwi Pangestu (INA) | Riau Ega Agatha (INA) | Khairul Anuar Mohamad (MAS) |

===== Individual recurve 30m =====
| Year | Location | Gold | Silver | Bronze |
|---|---|---|---|---|
| 1977 | Kuala Lumpur | (Indonesia) Donald Pandiangan (345) | (Malaysia) Cheng Jun (339) | (Indonesia) Suhartomo (339) |
| 1979 | Jakarta | (Indonesia) Donald Pandiangan (680) | (Thailand) Banchong Dosaness (671) | (Philippines) Carlos Santos Jr. (658) |
| 1981 | Manila | (Indonesia) Donald Pandiangan (679) | (Philippines) Carlos Santos Jr. (677) | (Indonesia) Hendra Gunawan (675) |
| 1983 | Singapore | (Indonesia) Suradi Rukimin (680) | (Indonesia) Donald Pandiangan (677) | (Thailand) Vallop Potaya (666) |
| 1985 | Bangkok | (Thailand) Sununt Tokahuta (684) | (Indonesia) Tatang Budiman (676) | (Indonesia) Suradi Rukimin (675) |
| 1987 | Jakarta | (Indonesia) Donald Pandiangan (673) | (Indonesia) Syafrudin Mawi (672) | (Thailand) Amphol Amalakajorn (671) |

===== Individual recurve 50m =====
| Year | Location | Gold | Silver | Bronze |
|---|---|---|---|---|
| 1977 | Kuala Lumpur | (Indonesia) Donald Pandiangan (316) | (Indonesia) Suhartomo (312) | (Philippines) Raffe Recto (312) |
| 1979 | Jakarta | (Indonesia) Donald Pandiangan (637) | (Philippines) Carlos Santos Jr. (620) | (Thailand) Banchong Dosanee (607) |
| 1981 | Manila | (Indonesia) Donald Pandiangan (639) | (Philippines) Carlos Santos Jr. (630) | (Indonesia) Tatang Budiman (611) |
| 1983 | Singapore | (Indonesia) Donald Pandiangan (640) | (Indonesia) Suradi Rukimin (628) | (Indonesia) Tatang Budiman (622) |
| 1985 | Bangkok | (Thailand) Sununt Tokahuta (623) | (Indonesia) Suradi Rukimin (621) | (Indonesia) Adang Adjidji (617) |
| 1987 | Jakarta | (Thailand) Amphol Amalakajorn (633) | (Indonesia) Syafrudin Mawi (633) | (Singapore) Phuay Chay Khoo, Eric (612) |

===== Individual recurve 70m =====
| Year | Location | Gold | Silver | Bronze |
|---|---|---|---|---|
| 1977 | Kuala Lumpur | (Philippines) June Santos Jr. (306) | (Indonesia) Donald Pandiangan (306) | (Malaysia) Cheng Jun (302) |
| 1979 | Jakarta | (Indonesia) Donald Pandiangan (634) | (Philippines) Carlos Santos Jr. (595) | (Thailand) Banchong Dosanee (592) |
| 1981 | Manila | (Indonesia) Donald Pandiangan (621) | (Thailand) Banchong Dosanee (604) | (Indonesia) Hendra Gunawan (604) |
| 1983 | Singapore | (Indonesia) Suradi Rukimin (621) | (Indonesia) Donald Pandiangan (618) | (Indonesia) Tatang Ferry Budiman (607) |
| 1985 | Bangkok | (Indonesia) Adang Adjidji (630) | (Indonesia) Suradi Rukimin (618) | (Indonesia) Imam Sugirman (615) |
| 1987 | Jakarta | (Indonesia) Adang Adjidji (622) | (Indonesia) Donald Pandiangan (613) | (Thailand) Amphol Amalakajorn (603) |

===== Individual recurve 90m =====
| Year | Location | Gold | Silver | Bronze |
|---|---|---|---|---|
| 1977 | Kuala Lumpur | (Philippines) June Santos (276) | (Malaysia) Cheng Jun (273) | (Thailand) Vallop Potaya (270) |
| 1979 | Jakarta | (Indonesia) Donald Pandiangan (557) | (Philippines) Carlos Santos Jr. (548) | (Thailand) Banchong Dosanee (509) |
| 1981 | Manila | (Indonesia) Donald Pandiangan (556) | (Thailand) Vallop Potaya (529) | (Philippines) Carlos Santos Jr. (529) |
| 1983 | Singapore | (Indonesia) Donald Pandiangan (561) | (Indonesia) Suradi Rukimin (536) | (Indonesia) Tatang Ferry Budiman (529) |
| 1985 | Bangkok | (Indonesia) Suradi Rukimin (568) | (Indonesia) Adang Adjidi (563) | (Thailand) Amphol Amarekajora (552) |
| 1987 | Jakarta | (Indonesia) Adang Adjidji (575) | (Indonesia) Donald Pandiangan (553) | (Thailand) Amphol Amalakajorn (533) |

===== Team recurve =====
| Games | Gold | Silver | Bronze |
|---|---|---|---|
| 1977 Kuala Lumpur | Indonesia (3591) | Philippines (3494) | Malaysia (3391) |
| 1979 Jakarta | Indonesia (7194) | Philippines (7062) | Thailand (6997) |
| 1981 Manila | Indonesia (7242) | Thailand (7193) | Philippines (7108) |
| 1983 Singapore | Indonesia (7382) | Thailand (7031) | Malaysia (6685) |
| 1985 Bangkok | Indonesia (7402) | Thailand (7262) | Singapore (7105) |
| 1987 Jakarta | Indonesia (7313) | Thailand (7106) | Singapore (6968) |
| 1989 Kuala Lumpur | Indonesia (7428) | Thailand (7179) | Philippines (7118) |
| 1991 Manila | Indonesia (7469) | Philippines (7233) | Malaysia (7034) |
| 1993 Singapore | Indonesia | Thailand | Philippines |
| 1995 Chiang Mai | Indonesia | Thailand | Philippines |
| 1997 Jakarta | Philippines | Indonesia | Thailand |
| 2001 Kuala Lumpur | Indonesia (INA) | Thailand (THA) | Myanmar (MYA) |
| 2003 Hanoi–Ho Chi Minh City | Malaysia (MAS) | Indonesia (INA) | Philippines (PHI) |
| 2005 Manila | Philippines (PHI) | Indonesia (INA) | Malaysia (MAS) |
| 2007 Nakhon Ratchasima | Malaysia (MAS) | Indonesia (INA) | Philippines (PHI) |
| 2009 Vientiane | Thailand (THA) | Malaysia (MAS) | Myanmar (MYA) |
| 2011 Jakarta–Palembang | Malaysia (MAS) | Thailand (THA) | Myanmar (MYA) |
| 2013 Naypyidaw | Malaysia (MAS) | Thailand (THA) | Indonesia (INA) |
| 2015 Singapore | Malaysia (MAS) | Indonesia (INA) | Singapore (SIN) |
| 2017 Kuala Lumpur | Malaysia (MAS) | Thailand (THA) | Philippines (PHI) |
| 2019 Philippines | Indonesia (INA) | Malaysia (MAS) | Thailand (THA) |
| 2021 Vietnam | Indonesia (INA) | Vietnam (VIE) | Malaysia (MAS) |

==== Compound ====
===== Individual compound =====
| Location | Gold | Silver | Bronze |
|---|---|---|---|
| 2005 Manila | Lang Hong Keong (MAS) | Ting Leong Fong (MAS) | I Gusti Nyoman Puruhito (INA) |
| 2007 Nakhon Ratchasima | I Gusti Nyoman Puruhito (INA) | Earl Benjamin Yap (PHI) | Ye Min Swe (MYA) |
| 2009 Vientiane | I Gusti Nyoman Puruhito (INA) | Adriel Chua Boon Rong (SIN) | Earl Benjamin Yap (PHI) |
| 2011 Jakarta | I Gusti Nyoman Puruhito (INA) | Earl Benjamin Yap (PHI) | Muhammad Zaki Mahazan (MAS) |
| 2013 Naypyidaw | Nguyen Tien Cuong (VIE) | Nitiphum Chatachot (THA) | Earl Benjamin Yap (PHI) |
| 2015 Singapore | Nguyen Tien Cuong (VIE) | Zulfadhli Ruslan (MAS) | Mohd Juwaidi Mazuki (MAS) |
| 2017 Kuala Lumpur | Prima Wisnu Wardhana (INA) | Mohd Juwaidi Mazuki (MAS) | Paul Marton Dela Cruz (PHI) |
| 2019 Philippines | Nitiphum Chatachot (THA) | Sirapop Chainak (THA) | Yoke Rizaldi Akbar (INA) |
| 2021 Vietnam | Mohd Juwaidi Mazuki (MAS) | Sirapop Chainak (THA) | Alang Ariff Aqil Muhammad Ghazalli (MAS) |

===== Team compound =====
| Location | Gold | Silver | Bronze |
|---|---|---|---|
| 2005 Manila | Malaysia (MAS) | Philippines (PHI) | Myanmar (MYA) |
| 2007 Nakhon Ratchasima | Vietnam (VIE) | Indonesia (INA) | Malaysia (MAS) |
| 2009 Vientiane | Vietnam (VIE) | Indonesia (INA) | Thailand (THA) |
| 2011 Jakarta–Palembang | Philippines (PHI) | Malaysia (MAS) | Myanmar (MYA) |
| 2013 Naypyidaw | Philippines (PHI) | Malaysia (MAS) | Thailand (THA) |
| 2015 Singapore | Malaysia (MAS) | Indonesia (INA) | Philippines (PHI) |
| 2017 Kuala Lumpur | Malaysia (MAS) | Singapore (SIN) | Philippines (PHI) |
| 2019 Philippines | Malaysia (MAS) | Vietnam (VIE) | Thailand (THA) |
| 2021 Vietnam | Indonesia (INA) | Malaysia (MAS) | Philippines (PHI) |

=== Women's event ===
==== Recurve ====
===== Individual recurve =====
| Games | Gold | Silver | Bronze |
|---|---|---|---|
| 1977 Kuala Lumpur | (Philippines) Jocelyn Guerrero (1180) | (Singapore) Samantha Tan Pek Hoon (1167) | (Malaysia) Cheryl Ng Sok Ping (1157) |
| 1979 Jakarta | (Indonesia) Prasetyo Nurningsih (2416) | (Indonesia) Rachmat Suminar (2336) | (Thailand) Amornrat Kaewbaidhoon (2323) |
| 1981 Manila | (Thailand) Amornrat Kaewbaidhoon (2473) | (Indonesia) Nurfitriyana Saiman (2381) | (Philippines) Cherrie Valera (2308) |
| 1983 Singapore | (Singapore) Samantha Tan Pek Hoon (2319) | (Indonesia) Nurfitriyana Saiman (2315) | (Indonesia) Zafilia Saiman (2310) |
| 1985 Bangkok | (Philippines) Joann Chan Tabanag (2479) | (Indonesia) Kusuma Wardhani (2479) | (Philippines) Cabrera Karla (2417) |
| 1987 Jakarta | (Indonesia) Kusuma Wardhani (2502) | (Indonesia) Nurfitriyana Saiman (2484) | (Philippines) Joann Chan Tabanag (2449) |
| 1989 Kuala Lumpur | (Indonesia) Lilies Handayani (2581) | (Indonesia) Nurfitriyana Saiman (2568) | (Philippines) Joann Chan Tabanag (2542) |
| 1991 Manila | (Indonesia) Purnama Pandiangan (2590) | (Indonesia) Rusena Gelanteh (2574) | (Philippines) Jennifer Chan (2534) |
| 1993 Singapore | (Indonesia) Nurfitriyana Lantang | (Philippines) Joann Chan Tabanag | (Indonesia) Hamdiah |
| 1995 Chiang Mai | (Philippines) Joann Chan Tabang | (Thailand) Wadsana Saikongdee | (Indonesia) Dahliana |
| 1997 Jakarta | (Thailand) Thaolipoh Surang | (Indonesia) Kusuma Wardhani | (Myanmar) Khin Tan Nwe |
| 2001 Kuala Lumpur | Marino Purita Joy (PHI) | Lim Geok Pong (MAS) | Rusena Gelanteh (INA) |
| 2003 Hanoi | Rina Dewi Puspitasari (INA) | Mon Redee (MAS) | Rusena Gelanteh (INA) |
| 2005 Manila | Rina Dewi Puspitasari (INA) | Yasmidar Hamid (INA) | Rachelle Anne Cabral (PHI) |
| 2007 Nakhon Ratchasima | Ika Yuliana Rochmawati (INA) | Rina Dewi Puspitasari (INA) | Sakulchai Chutinan (THA) |
| 2009 Vientiane | Novia Nuraini (INA) | Anbarasi Subramaniam (MAS) | Noor Aziera Taip (MAS) |
| 2011 Jakarta–Palembang | Erwina Safitri (INA) | Thin Thin Khine (MYA) | Patheera Boonnark (THA) |
| 2013 Naypyidaw | Chan Jing Ru (SIN) | Titik Kusumawardani (INA) | Ika Yuliana Rochmawati (INA) |
| 2015 Singapore | Titik Kusumawardani (INA) | Loc Thi Dao (VIE) | Le Thi Thu Hien (VIE) |
| 2017 Kuala Lumpur | Diananda Choirunisa (INA) | Nicole Marie Tagle (PHI) | Nur Aliya Ghapar (MAS) |
| 2019 Philippines | Lộc Thị Đào (VIE) | Pyae Sone Hnin (MYA) | Thidar Nwe (MYA) |
| 2021 Hanoi | Rezza Octavia (INA) | Narisara Khunhiranchaiyo (THA) | Syaqiera Mashayikh (MAS) |

===== Individual recurve 30m =====
| Year | Location | Gold | Silver | Bronze |
|---|---|---|---|---|
| 1977 | Kuala Lumpur | (Philippines) Jocelyn Guerrero (325) | (Singapore) Samantha Tan Pek Hoon (325) | (Philippines) Ramos Carla (324) |
| 1979 | Jakarta | (Indonesia) Rachmat Suminar (661) | (Indonesia) Prasetyo Nurningsih (658) | (Philippines) Guerrero Jocelyn (633) |
| 1981 | Manila | (Thailand) Amornrat Kaewbaidhoon (646) | (Philippines) Carla Ramos (644) | (Indonesia) Nurfitriyana Saiman (635) |
| 1983 | Singapore | (Philippines) Cherrie Valera (648) | (Singapore) Samantha Tan Pek Hoon (639) | (Indonesia) Jenny Darochmai (638) |
| 1985 | Bangkok | (Indonesia) Fitrizal Iriani (673) | (Thailand) Virungrong Chompooming (671) | (Indonesia) Kusuma Wardhani (671) |
| 1987 | Jakarta | (Indonesia) Nurfitriyana Saiman (669) | (Indonesia) Fitrizal Iriani (666) | (Indonesia) Kusuma Wardhani (664) |

===== Individual recurve 50m =====
| Year | Location | Gold | Silver | Bronze |
|---|---|---|---|---|
| 1977 | Kuala Lumpur | (Philippines) Jocelyn Guerrero (294) | (Singapore) Samantha Tan Pek Hoon (285) | (Thailand) Amornrai Khewbaidhoon (277) |
| 1979 | Jakarta | (Indonesia) Prasetyo Nurningsih (594) | (Philippines) Carla Ramas (558) | (Singapore) Samantha Tan Pek Hoon (558) |
| 1981 | Manila | (Thailand) Amornrat Kaewbaidhoon (599) | (Thailand) Jariya Jingjit (575) | (Singapore) Christina Law (570) |
| 1983 | Singapore | (Indonesia) Zefilia Saiman (577) | (Indonesia) Nurfitriyana Saiman (575) | (Indonesia) Jenny Darochmat (555) |
| 1985 | Bangkok | (Philippines) Joann Chan Tabanag (610) | (Indonesia) Pitizal Iriani (608) | (Indonesia) Kusuma Wardhani (589) |
| 1987 | Jakarta | (Philippines) Joann Chan Tabanag (606) | (Indonesia) Nurfitriyana Saiman (603) | (Indonesia) Kusuma Wardhani (603) |

===== Individual recurve 60m =====
| Year | Location | Gold | Silver | Bronze |
|---|---|---|---|---|
| 1977 | Kuala Lumpur | (Thailand) Amornrat Kaewbaidhoon (291) | (Singapore) Samantha Tan Pek Hoon (289) | (Philippines) Jocelyn Guerrero (289) |
| 1979 | Jakarta | (Indonesia) Prasetyo Nurningsih (602) | (Singapore) Samantha Tan Pek Hoon (599) | (Indonesia) Suminar Rachmat (592) |
| 1981 | Manila | (Indonesia) Nurfitriyana Saiman (624) | (Thailand) Amornrat Kaewbaidhoon (621) | (Indonesia) Dhayamanti Adhidarma (595) |
| 1983 | Singapore | (Philippines) Cherrie Valera (581) | (Indonesia) Nurfitriyana Saiman (580) | (Singapore) Samantha Tan Pek Hoon (576) (Thailand) Jariya Jingjit (576) |
| 1985 | Bangkok | (Philippines) Joann Chan Tabanag (629) | (Philippines) Karla Cabrera (612) | (Philippines) Cherrie Valera (609) |
| 1987 | Jakarta | (Indonesia) Nurfitriyana Saiman (629) | (Indonesia) Fitrizal Iriani (614) | (Indonesia) Kusuma Wardhani (614) |

===== Individual recurve 70m =====
| Year | Location | Gold | Silver | Bronze |
|---|---|---|---|---|
| 1977 | Kuala Lumpur | (Indonesia) Suminar Rachmat (279) | (Malaysia) Cheryll Ng Sok Ping (279) | (Philippines) Jocelyn Guerrero (272) |
| 1979 | Jakarta | (Indonesia) Prasetyo Nurningsih (562) | (Thailand) Amornrat Kaewbaidhoon (557) | (Indonesia) Suminar Rachmat (553) |
| 1981 | Manila | (Thailand) Amornrat Kaewbaidhoon (607) | (Indonesia) Nurfitriyana Saiman (572) | (Philippines) Cherrie Valera (552) |
| 1983 | Singapore | (Singapore) Samantha Tan Pek Hoon (565) | (Indonesia) Zefilia Saiman (548) | (Indonesia) Nurfitriyana Saiman (532) |
| 1985 | Bangkok | (Indonesia) Kusuma Wardhani (613) | (Thailand) Usanee Tokahuta (577) | (Philippines) Joan Chan (576) |
| 1987 | Jakarta | (Indonesia) Kusuma Wardhani (621) | (Indonesia) Nurfitriyana Saiman (583) | (Philippines) Helia Patracios (582) |

===== Team recurve =====
| Games | Gold | Silver | Bronze |
|---|---|---|---|
| 1977 Kuala Lumpur | Philippines (3391) | Singapore (3289) | Indonesia (3165) |
| 1979 Jakarta | Indonesia (6996) | Philippines (6789) | Singapore (6636) |
| 1981 Manila | Thailand (6966) | Indonesia (6935) | Philippines (6849) |
| 1983 Singapore | Indonesia (6869) | Thailand (6686) | Philippines (6643) |
| 1985 Bangkok | Philippines (7294) | Indonesia (7272) | Thailand (7168) |
| 1987 Jakarta | Indonesia (7398) | Philippines (7085) | Thailand (7025) |
| 1989 Kuala Lumpur | Indonesia (7619) | Philippines (7116) | Thailand (6824) |
| 1991 Manila | Indonesia (7730) | Philippines (7359) | Thailand (7011) |
| 1993 Singapore | Indonesia | Philippines | Malaysia |
| 1995 Chiang Mai | Indonesia | Malaysia | Thailand |
| 1997 Jakarta | Philippines | Myanmar | Thailand |
| 2001 Kuala Lumpur | Indonesia (INA) | Malaysia (MAS) | Myanmar (MYA) |
| 2003 Hanoi | Philippines (PHI) | Malaysia (MAS) | Indonesia (INA) |
| 2005 Manila | Malaysia (MAS) | Indonesia (INA) | Myanmar (MYA) |
| 2007 Nakhon Ratchasima | Indonesia (INA) | Malaysia (MAS) | Thailand (THA) |
| 2009 Vientiane | Indonesia (INA) | Singapore (SIN) | Myanmar (MYA) |
| 2011 Jakarta | Indonesia (INA) | Vietnam (VIE) | Myanmar (MYA) |
| 2013 Naypyidaw | Indonesia (INA) | Vietnam (VIE) | Myanmar (MYA) |
| 2015 Singapore | Vietnam (VIE) | Indonesia (INA) | Malaysia (MAS) |
| 2017 Kuala Lumpur | Malaysia (MAS) | Indonesia (INA) | Philippines (PHI) |
| 2019 Philippines | Vietnam (VIE) | Myanmar (MYA) | Indonesia (INA) |
| 2021 Hanoi | Philippines (PHI) | Vietnam (VIE) | Myanmar (MYA) |

==== Compound ====
===== Individual compound =====
| Location | Gold | Silver | Bronze |
|---|---|---|---|
| 2005 Manila | Amaya Paz (PHI) | Jennifer Chan (PHI) | Maryanne Gul (SIN) |
| 2007 Nakhon Ratchasima | Amaya Paz (PHI) | Dellie Threesyadinda (INA) | Aung Ngeain (MYA) |
| 2009 Vientiane | Jennifer Dy Chan (PHI) | Aung Ngeain (MYA) | Narisara Tinbua (THA) |
| 2011 Jakarta | Aung Ngeain (MYA) | Jennifer Dy Chan (PHI) | Lilies Heliarti (INA) |
| 2013 Naypyidaw | Aung Ngeain (MYA) | Dellie Threesyadinda (INA) | Cham Nong Saritha (MAS) |
| 2015 Singapore | Fatin Nurfatehah Mat Salleh (MAS) | Amaya Paz (PHI) | Rona Siska Sari (INA) |
| 2017 Kuala Lumpur | Sri Ranti (INA) | Châu Kiều Oanh (VIE) | Fatin Nurfatehah Mat Salleh (MAS) |
| 2019 Philippines | Kanoknapus Kaewchomphu (THA) | Fatin Nurfatehah Mat Salleh (MAS) | Hlang Su Su (VIE) |
| 2021 Hanoi | Contessa Loh Tze Chieh (SGP) | Lê Phương Thảo (VIE) | Madeleine Ong Xue Li (SGP) |

===== Team compound =====
| Games | Gold | Silver | Bronze |
|---|---|---|---|
| 2005 Manila | Philippines (PHI) | Indonesia (INA) | Myanmar (MYA) |
| 2007 Nakhon Ratchasima | Philippines (PHI) | Indonesia (INA) | Singapore (SIN) |
| 2009 Vientiane | Myanmar (MYA) | Malaysia (MAS) | Indonesia (INA) |
| 2011 Jakarta–Palembang | Myanmar (MYA) | Malaysia (MAS) | Thailand (THA) |
| 2013 Naypyidaw | Indonesia (INA) | Thailand (THA) | Myanmar (MYA) |
| 2015 Singapore | Malaysia (MAS) | Thailand (THA) | Philippines (PHI) |
| 2017 Kuala Lumpur | Malaysia (MAS) | Vietnam (VIE) | Indonesia (INA) |
| 2019 Philippines | Thailand (THA) | Indonesia (INA) | Vietnam (VIE) |
| 2021 Hanoi | Thailand (THA) | Vietnam (VIE) | Malaysia (MAS) |

=== Mixed event ===
==== Team recurve ====
| Games | Gold | Silver | Bronze |
|---|---|---|---|
| 2011 Jakarta–Palembang | Indonesia (INA) | Malaysia (MAS) | Thailand (THA) |
| 2013 Naypyidaw | Vietnam (VIE) | Singapore (SIN) | Indonesia (INA) |
| 2015 Singapore | Indonesia (INA) | Malaysia (MAS) | Vietnam (VIE) |
| 2017 Kuala Lumpur | Indonesia (INA) | Malaysia (MAS) | Vietnam (VIE) |
| 2019 Philippines | Vietnam (VIE) | Indonesia (INA) | Malaysia (MAS) |
| 2021 Hanoi | Indonesia (INA) | Malaysia (MAS) | Vietnam (VIE) |

==== Team compound ====
| Games | Gold | Silver | Bronze |
|---|---|---|---|
| 2011 Jakarta–Palembang | Myanmar (MYA) | Malaysia (MAS) | Indonesia (INA) |
| 2013 Naypyidaw | Laos (LAO) | Malaysia (MAS) | Myanmar (MYA) |
| 2015 Singapore | Malaysia (MAS) | Thailand (THA) | Philippines (PHI) |
| 2017 Kuala Lumpur | Malaysia (MAS) | Myanmar (MYA) | Vietnam (VIE) |
| 2019 Philippines | Philippines (PHI) | Vietnam (VIE) | Indonesia (INA) |
| 2021 Hanoi | Malaysia (MAS) | Philippines (PHI) | Thailand (THA) |
