= Archery at the 1988 Summer Olympics – Women's team =

Archery at the Olympics

Women's team at the Games of the XXIV Olympiad
- Venue: Hwarang Archery Field
- Dates: 27 September – 1 October 1988
- Competitors: 45 from 15 nations

Medalists
1st place, gold medalist(s)		Kim Soo-nyung; Wang Hee-kyung; Yun Young-sook	South Korea
2nd place, silver medalist(s)		Lilies Handayani; Nurfitriyana Saiman; Kusuma Wardhani	Indonesia
3rd place, bronze medalist(s)		Deborah Ochs; Denise Parker; Melanie Skillman	United States

A total of 15 nations competed in the women's team event at the 1988 Summer Olympics as part of the archery programme. The ranking round score for a team was the sum of the three scores earned by the individual archers in the individual ranking round. The top twelve nations competed in the semifinals, with the top eight advancing to the finals.

== Summary ==
Preliminary round

The ranking round score for a team was the sum of the three scores earned by the individual archers in the individual ranking round. The top twelve nations competed in the semifinals, with the top eight moving on to the final.

Semifinal

In the women's team semifinals, Korea kept a firm grip on the lead. The Chinese Taipei team plummeted eight places to eleventh, joining Mongolia, China, and Poland in not advancing to the finals. The Soviets dropped a place but still looked strong even as the Americans passed them and the Indonesian and British teams grew nearer.

Final

A tie for the silver medal between Indonesia and the United States was resolved using a nine arrow tie-breaker. The Indonesian women shot a 72, while the Americans shot a 67. 15-year-old American Denise Parker become the youngest medalist in the history of Olympic archery. This was also the first medal, in any sport, the Indonesians had won at the Olympics. The Soviets were behind both teams by only 1 point, while the Koreans won easily by a margin of 30 points.

== Result ==
Rank	Nation	Archer	Open round	Rank	Semifinal	Rank	Grand final
1st place, gold medalist(s)	South Korea	Kim Soo-nyung; Wang Hee-kyung; Yun Young-sook	3925	1	1000	1	982
2nd place, silver medalist(s)	Indonesia	Lilies Handayani; Nurfitriyana Saiman; Kusuma Wardhani	3720	5	975	4	952
3rd place, bronze medalist(s)	United States	Deborah Ochs; Denise Parker; Melanie Skillman	3742	4	988	2	952
4	Soviet Union	Lioudmila Arjannikova; Natalya Butuzova; Tetiana Muntian	3818	2	978	3	951
5	Great Britain	Pauline Edwards; Joanne Franks; Cheryl Sutton	3692	7	962	5	933
6	West Germany	Doris Haas; Claudia Kriz; Christa Oeckl	3702	6	953	6	931
7	Sweden	Liselotte Andersson; Carina Jonsson; Jenny Sjöwall	3662	10	949	8	930
8	France	Marie-Josée Bazin; Nathalie Hibon; Catherine Pellen	3653	11	950	7	898
9	China	Ma Shaorong; Ma Xiangjun; Yao Yawen	3683	8	948	9	–
10	Poland	Joanna Helbin; Beata Iwanek; Joanna Kwasna	3681	9	945	10	–
11	Chinese Taipei	Chin Chiu-Yueh; Lai Fang-Mei; Liu Pi-Yu	3749	3	939	11	–
12	Mongolia	Dorjsembee Erdenechimeg; Sambuu Oyuntsetseg; Suvd Tuul	3626	12	912	12	–
13	Finland	Päivi Aaltonen; Minna Heinonen; Jutta Poikolainen	3593	13	–	–	–
14	Turkey	Elif Eksi; Huriye Eksi; Selda Unsal	3590	14	–	–	–
15	Japan	Kyoko Kitahara; Keiko Nakagomi; Toyoka Oki	3567	15	–	–	–
