= Archery at the 1988 Summer Olympics – Women's individual =

Archery at the Olympics

Women's individual at the Games of the XXIV Olympiad
- Venue: Hwarang Archery Field
- Dates: 27–30 September 1988
- Competitors: 62 from 30 nations

Medalists
1st place, gold medalist(s)		Kim Soo-nyung	South Korea
2nd place, silver medalist(s)		Wang Hee-kyung	South Korea
3rd place, bronze medalist(s)		Yun Young-sook	South Korea

The women's individual was one of two events for women out of four total events on the archery programme at the 1988 Summer Olympics.

== Summary ==
Preliminary ranking round

Each archer shot a FITA round, consisting of 144 arrows split evenly between the distances of 70 metres, 60 metres, 50 metres, and 30 metres. The top 24 archers qualified for the next round.

The Korean women, who had begun to show strength in the sport four years earlier, completely dominated the preliminary round. They took the three top places as Kim Soo-Nyung shattered the previous Olympic record for a FITA round. The Soviet Union also qualified three archers for the next round when all three placed in the top eight. Chinese Taipei, the United States, China, Sweden, Indonesia, and Great Britain had two archers advance.

1/8 final

Each archer shot one quarter of the normal number of arrows in a FITA round. The 36 arrows were split evenly between the four distances of 70 metres, 60 metres, 50 metres, and 30 metres. The top 18 archers qualified for the quarterfinals.

All three Korean women and all three Soviet archers advanced, as did two archers from Sweden, Chinese Taipei, and Great Britain. China, Indonesia, France, Poland, West Germany, and the United States each had one archer move on.

Quarterfinal

Each archer shot one quarter of the normal number of arrows in a FITA round. The 36 arrows were split evenly between the four distances of 70 metres, 60 metres, 50 metres, and 30 metres. The top 12 archers qualified for the semifinals.

The Soviet women had a relatively poor round, each of the three dropping at least six places in the standings. Boutouza fell all the way to last place, and Mountain was nearly eliminated as well. The Koreans, on the other hand, continued to shoot well, recapturing the top two spots.

Semifinal

Each archer shot one quarter of the normal number of arrows in a FITA round. The 36 arrows were split evenly between the four distances of 70 metres, 60 metres, 50 metres, and 30 metres. The top 8 archers moved on to the semifinals.

There was very little movement in the rankings, as seven of the archers retained the same positions they had in the quarterfinal. Korea again advanced all three of its archers. The remaining Soviet women both advanced, though no other nation advanced more than one archer. Sweden, Great Britain, and West Germany each sent one archer to fill out the top eight.

Final

Each archer shot one quarter of the normal number of arrows in a FITA round. The 36 arrows were split evenly between the four distances of 70 metres, 60 metres, 50 metres, and 30 metres. Medals were awarded to the top three archers in the final round.

The Korean women performed the first sweep of an archery events medals since the establishment of modern Olympic archery. It was not a foregone conclusion, however, as Yun Young-Sook required a tie-breaker to defeat Arjannikova of the Soviet Union.

== Results ==
Rank	Archer	Nation	Open round	Rank	Eighth final	Rank	Quarter final	Rank	Semi final	Rank	Grand final
1st place, gold medalist(s)	Kim Soo-nyung	South Korea	1331	1	331	2	337	1	340	1	344
2nd place, silver medalist(s)	Wang Hee-kyung	South Korea	1298	2	320	5	330	2	332	2	332
3rd place, bronze medalist(s)	Yun Young-sook	South Korea	1296	3	328	3	326	5	326	7	327
4	Lioudmila Arjannikova	Soviet Union	1279	6	332	1	326	6	329	5	327
5	Jenny Sjöwall	Sweden	1294	4	305	16	327	4	330	3	325
6	Claudia Kriz	West Germany	1250	17	311	11	322	8	326	8	318
7	Joanne Franks	Great Britain	1281	5	301	18	327	3	330	4	318
8	Tetiana Muntian	Soviet Union	1272	7	319	6	316	12	328	6	314
9	Nurfitriyana Saiman	Indonesia	1258	12	314	9	324	7	325	9	–
10	Melanie Skillman	United States	1252	15	307	14	318	9	311	10	–
11	Ma Xiangjun	China	1233	21	322	4	318	10	309	11	–
12	Lai Fang-Mei	Chinese Taipei	1257	13	312	10	317	11	306	12	–
13	Liselotte Andersson	Sweden	1257	14	317	7	315	13	–	–	–
14	Catherine Pellen	France	1241	19	309	13	313	14	–	–	–
15	Liu Pi-Yu	Chinese Taipei	1266	10	306	15	310	15	–	–	–
16	Joanna Kwasna	Poland	1252	16	304	17	303	16	–	–	–
17	Pauline Edwards	Great Britain	1232	23	311	12	301	17	–	–	–
18	Natalya Butuzova	Soviet Union	1267	8	314	8	300	18	–	–	–
19	Kusuma Wardhani	Indonesia	1239	20	300	19	–	–	–	–	–
20	Päivi Aaltonen	Finland	1266	9	299	20	–	–	–	–	–
21	Denise Parker	United States	1263	11	298	21	–	–	–	–	–
22	Ma Shaorong	China	1233	22	298	22	–	–	–	–	–
23	Jacqueline van Rozendaal-van Gerven	Netherlands	1246	18	293	23	–	–	–	–	–
24	Suvd Tuul	Mongolia	1231	24	290	24	–	–	–	–	–
25	Christa Öckl	West Germany	1230	25	–	–	–	–	–	–	–
26	Deborah Ochs	United States	1227	26	–	–	–	–	–	–	–
27	Chin Chiu-Yueh	Chinese Taipei	1226	27	–	–	–	–	–	–	–
28	Nathalie Hibon	France	1224	28	–	–	–	–	–	–	–
29	Aurora Bretón	Mexico	1224	29	–	–	–	–	–	–	–
30	Lilies Handayani	Indonesia	1223	30	–	–	–	–	–	–	–
31	Toyoko Oku	Japan	1223	31	–	–	–	–	–	–	–
32	Doris Haas	West Germany	1222	32	–	–	–	–	–	–	–
33	Beata Iwanek	Poland	1222	33	–	–	–	–	–	–	–
34	Brenda Cuming	Canada	1217	34	–	–	–	–	–	–	–
35	Yao Yawen	China	1217	35	–	–	–	–	–	–	–
36	Ann Shurrock	New Zealand	1217	36	–	–	–	–	–	–	–
37	Ana de Sousa	Portugal	1213	37	–	–	–	–	–	–	–
38	Pereira Greene	Ireland	1208	38	–	–	–	–	–	–	–
39	Vreny Burger	Switzerland	1208	39	–	–	–	–	–	–	–
40	Joanna Helbin	Poland	1207	40	–	–	–	–	–	–	–
41	Huriye Ekşi	Turkey	1205	41	–	–	–	–	–	–	–
42	Elif Ekşi	Turkey	1204	42	–	–	–	–	–	–	–
43	Anita Smits	Netherlands	1203	43	–	–	–	–	–	–	–
44	Sambuugiin Oyuuntsetseg	Mongolia	1202	44	–	–	–	–	–	–	–
45	Nadia Gautschi	Switzerland	1194	45	–	–	–	–	–	–	–
46	Dorjsembeegiin Erdenchimeg	Mongolia	1193	46	–	–	–	–	–	–	–
47	Marie-Josée Bazin	France	1188	47	–	–	–	–	–	–	–
48	Ilse Martha Ries-Hotz	Luxembourg	1187	48	–	–	–	–	–	–	–
49	Basilisa Ygnalaga	Philippines	1182	49	–	–	–	–	–	–	–
50	Selda Ünsal	Turkey	1181	50	–	–	–	–	–	–	–
51	Cheryl Sutton	Great Britain	1179	51	–	–	–	–	–	–	–
52	Keiko Nakagomi	Japan	1173	52	–	–	–	–	–	–	–
53	Kyoko Kitahara	Japan	1171	53	–	–	–	–	–	–	–
54	Gloria Rosa	Puerto Rico	1168	54	–	–	–	–	–	–	–
55	Jutta Poikolainen	Finland	1164	55	–	–	–	–	–	–	–
56	Minna Heinonen	Finland	1163	56	–	–	–	–	–	–	–
57	María Teresa Valdés	Spain	1125	57	–	–	–	–	–	–	–
58	Joanna Agius	Malta	1121	58	–	–	–	–	–	–	–
59	Carina Jonsson	Sweden	1111	59	–	–	–	–	–	–	–
60	Chan Siu Yuk	Hong Kong	1098	60	–	–	–	–	–	–	–
61	Iliana Biridakis	Jordan	1055	61	–	–	–	–	–	–	–
62	Merrellyn Tarr	Zimbabwe	1015	62	–	–	–	–	–	–	–
