= María Clara (disambiguation) =

María Clara is a fictional character in José Rizal's novel Noli Me Tángere.

Maria Clara may also refer to:

- Maria Clara gown
- Maria Clara Awards, film and television awards in the Philippines
- María Clara doctrine, a Philippine legal doctrine
- María Clara Parish Church, former national cathedral of the Philippine Independent Church, see Philippine Independent Church#María Clara Parish Church
- Maria Clara L. Lobregat Highway
- Maria Clara at Ibarra, a 2022 Philippine television series
- La Bulaqueña, a painting by John Luna sometimes called María Clara

== People ==
- María Clara Pancha Alonso, an actress known as Clara Alonso (actress)
- Maria Clara of the Child Jesus, a Portuguese Roman Catholic professed religious who established the Franciscan Hospitaller Sisters of the Immaculate Conception in Lisbon
- Maria Clara Correia Alves, Portuguese feminist and writer
- Maria Clara Eimmart, a German astronomer, engraver and designer
- María Claudia Falcone, who was kidnapped during the Night of the Pencils
- Maria Clara Giai Pron, an Italian slalom canoeist
- Maria Clara Lobregat, a Philippine politician
- Maria Clara Lobo, a Brazilian synchronised swimmer
- Maria Clara Machado, a Brazilian playwright
- Maria Clara Marra, a Brazilian politician
- Maria Clara Pacheco, Brazilian taekwondo practitioner
- María Clara Rohner, an Argentine rower
- Maria Clara Trujillo, Colombian artist

== Fictional ==
- Maria Clara "Klay" Infantes, the titular protagonist of Maria Clara at Ibarra

== See also ==
- Marie-Claire
- Head, Clara and Maria, a municipality in Canada
- Clara María Ochoa, a Colombian film producer
- Clara Maria Pope, a British painter and botanical artist
- Clara Maria of Pomerania-Barth, a member of the House of Griffins and by her two marriages Duchess of Mecklenburg-Schwerin-Ivenack and Brunswick-Dannenberg-Hitzacker
