= Ileana =

- Gender: Female
- Language: Romanian, Spanish, Italian

Origin
- Origin: Derived from Greek Ἑλένη (Helénē)
- Meaning: "Light" or "torch"

Other names
- Variant forms: Elena, Ilena, Iliana, Ilona, Ilana
- Nicknames: Ilea, Liana, Ana
- Related names: Helen, Helena, Ilona

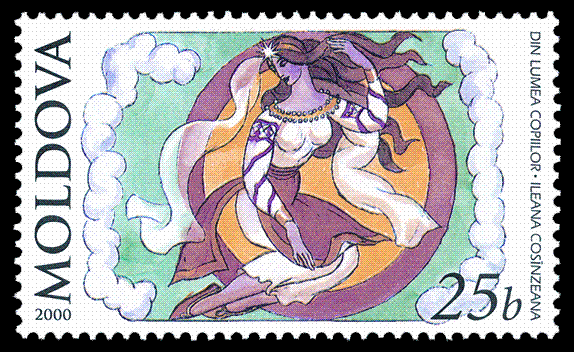
Ileana Cosânzeana depicted on a Moldovan stamp

Ileana is a feminine given name commonly used in Romanian and other Romance language-speaking countries such as Spain and Italy.

== Etymology and meaning ==
The name Ileana is derived from the Greek name Helénē (Ἑλένη), meaning "torch" or "light." It is the Romanian and some Romance language forms of the name Helen, historically popular due to the legendary figure Helen of Troy.

== Usage ==
Ileana is primarily used in Romania and Moldova, but variants and related names appear in Italy, Spain, and other Romance language countries.

In Romanian folklore, the name is associated with the character Ileana Cosânzeana, a beautiful and heroic fairy princess often portrayed as the idealized woman or goddess of love and beauty. She appears in numerous Romanian fairy tales as a symbol of purity and grace.

== People ==
=== Ileana ===
- Princess Ileana of Romania (1909–1991)
- Ileana Beltrán, Cuban judoka
- Ileana Cabra, Puerto Rican singer
- Ileana Citaristi, Italian dancer
- Ileana Cosânzeana, figure in Romanian mythology
- Ileana Cotrubaș, Romanian opera soprano
- Illeana Douglas, American actress
- Ileana D'Cruz, Indian-born Portuguese actress
- Ileana Gyulai-Drîmbă-Jenei, Romanian fencer
- Ileana Márquez (born 1996), Venezuelan beauty pageant titleholder who was crowned Miss Venezuela 2023
- Ileana Ongar, former Italian hurdler
- Ileana Ros-Lehtinen, member of the US House of Representatives
- Ileana Salvador, Italian race walker
- Ileana Sararoiu (1936–1979), Romanian singer
- Ileana Silai (1941–2025), Romanian middle-distance runner
- Ileana Sonnabend, Romanian art dealer

=== Iliana ===
- Iliana Biridakis, Jordanian archer
- Iliana Fox, English-born Mexican actress
- Iliana Hernández, Cuban journalist
- Iliana Ilieva, Bulgarian rhythmic gymnast
- Iliana Ivanova, Bulgarian politician and economist
- Iliana Nikolova, Bulgarian canoe sprinter
- Iliana Ortega, Mexican artist
- Iliana Raeva, Bulgarian rhythmic gymnast
- Iliana Rupert, French basketball player
- Iliana Ruzza, Venezuelan public official
- Iliana Yotova, Bulgarian politician

== Fictional characters ==
- Ileana Cosânzeana, a figure in Romanian folk literature
- Illeana Scott, played by Angelina Jolie in Taking Lives

== See also ==
- Ileana, a commune in Călăraşi County, Romania
- Ileana, a village in Glodeanu Sărat Commune, Buzău County, Romania
- Ilenuța, a village in Fălești District, Moldova
- Eliana (name)
- Elena (name)
- Ilyana (disambiguation)
