= Marie-Claire =

Marie-Claire is a given name. It is a combination of the names Marie and Claire, which are both of French origin. It may refer to:

- Marie-Claire Alain (1926–2013), organist and organ teacher
- Marie-Claire Baldenweg (born 1954), contemporary artist
- Marie-Claire Bancquart (1932–2019), French poet, novelist and literary critic
- Marie Claire Barikukiye, Burundian politician
- Marie Claire de Bauffremont, French courtier
- Marie-Claire Blais (1939–2021), author and playwright
- Marie-Claire Caron-Harant, French footballer
- Marie-Claire Chevalier (1955–2022), French abortion activist
- Marie-Claire Cordonier Segger, British lawyer and politician
- Marie-Claire Daveluy (1880–1968), Canadian librarian, historian and writer
- Marie-Claire D'Ubaldo, singer
- Marie-Claire Faray, women's activist
- Marie-Claire Foblets, Belgian lawyer and anthropologist
- Marie-Claire Heureuse Félicité (1758–1858), Empress of Haiti
- Marie-Claire Houart, Belgian civil servant
- Marie-Claire Jamet (born 1933), French classical harpist
- Marie-Claire Kirkland (1924–2016), judge and politician
- Marie-Claire Matip, Cameroonian writer
- Marie Claire Mukasine, Rwandan politician
- Marie-Claire Mvumbi (born 1978), Congo-born Belgian politician
- Marie-Claire Nseng-Elang, Attorney General at the Supreme Court of Cameroon
- Marie-Claire Pauwels (1945–2011), French journalist
- Marie-Claire Restoux (born 1968), judoka
- Marie Claire Ross (born 1975/1976), Canadian para-swimmer
- Marie-Claire Schanne-Klein, French physicist
- Marie Claire van Stevens (born 1948), Belgian archer
- Marie Claire Uwumuremyi, Rwandan politician
- Marie Claire Villeval (born 1957), French economist
- Marie-Claire Zimmermann (born 1975), Austrian journalist and television presenter

== See also ==
- Claire-Marie Le Guay
- Marie Claire, a magazine
- Mary-Claire King
- María Clara (disambiguation)
