= Boxing at the 1977 SEA Games =

List of medalists at sporting event

Boxing at the 1977 Southeast Asian Games took place at Chin Woo Stadium in Kuala Lumpur. Indonesia won the overall championship with all five finalists winning their respective bouts.

== Medalists ==
Event	Gold	Silver	Bronze
Light Flyweight	Siri Supunya; Thailand	Abe Rahim Salim; Malaysia	Than Lwin; Burma
Light Flyweight	Siri Supunya; Thailand	Abe Rahim Salim; Malaysia	Simon Tan; Singapore
Flyweight	Johny Riberu; Indonesia	Alan Jardinel; Philippines	Tin Maung; Burma
Flyweight	Johny Riberu; Indonesia	Alan Jardinel; Philippines	Payao Poontarat; Thailand
Bantamweight	Nyo Wan; Burma	Rogelio Fortaleza; Philippines	Cho Maneerasyakorn; Thailand
Bantamweight	Nyo Wan; Burma	Rogelio Fortaleza; Philippines	Ferry Moniaga; Indonesia
Featherweight	Reynaldo Fortaleza; Philippines	Syed Mohammad Assam; Malaysia	Wina Ratanarum; Thailand
Featherweight	Reynaldo Fortaleza; Philippines	Syed Mohammad Assam; Malaysia	Krishnasamy Selvarajoo; Singapore
Lightweight	Ruben Mares; Philippines	Haram Kham; Burma	Pichari Worasri; Thailand
Lightweight	Ruben Mares; Philippines	Haram Kham; Burma	Kishore Singh; Singapore
Light Welterweight	Syamsul Anwar Harahap; Indonesia	Koh Chan Lee; Malaysia	Haridas G Singapore
Light Welterweight	Syamsul Anwar Harahap; Indonesia	Koh Chan Lee; Malaysia	Asut Pungt; Brunei
Welterweight	Fernando Cruz; Philippines	Udom Jouycharern; Thailand	Hashim Yusof; Malaysia
Welterweight	Fernando Cruz; Philippines	Udom Jouycharern; Thailand	Frans van Bronckhorst; Indonesia
Light Middleweight	Rabieb Sangnual; Thailand	K Krishnan; Singapore	Yousoff Ismail; Brunei
Light Middleweight	Rabieb Sangnual; Thailand	K Krishnan; Singapore	Tin Myint; Burma
Middleweight	Wiem Gommies; Indonesia	Ibrahim Mardex; Malaysia	Jit Pantsui; Thailand
Middleweight	Wiem Gommies; Indonesia	Ibrahim Mardex; Malaysia	Ruby Saw; Burma
Light Heavyweight	Benny Maniani; Indonesia	Sangoh Wichiansul; Thailand	Kadir Hussein; Malaysia
Heavyweight	Krismanto Soembaga; Indonesia	Abdul Kadeer; Malaysia	Only 2 entries

== Medal table ==
Rank	Nation	Gold	Silver	Bronze	Total
1	Indonesia (INA)	5	0	2	7
2	Philippines (PHI)	3	2	0	5
3	Thailand (THA)	2	2	5	9
4	Burma (BIR)	1	1	4	6
5	Malaysia (MAS)	0	5	2	7
6	Singapore (SGP)	0	1	4	5
7	Brunei (BRU)	0	0	2	2
Totals (7 entries)		11	11	19	41
