= María Valdés =

María Valdés may refer to:

- María de Valdés, Spanish swimmer
- María Fernanda Valdés (born 1992), Chilean weightlifter
- María Teresa Valdés (1961–2003), Spanish archer
