= Manuela Dachner =

German archer (born 1960)

Manuela Dachner (born 15 June 1960 in Pforzheim) is a German former archer who represented West Germany in tournaments.

== Life ==
Dachner received her first bow at the age of eight when her father carved her one. In 1984 she qualified as a physiotherapist.

== Archery ==
She became German champion in 1981 and 1982. At the 1983 World Archery Championships she won a silver medal in the women's team event along with Doris Haas and Miloslava Zahradnicek.

She competed at the 1984 Summer Olympic Games in the women's individual event and finished sixth with 2508 points scored.

Dachner won a bronze medal in the women's team event of the 1985 World Archery Championships along with Doris Haas and Margot Benz.

Dachner retired from competitive archery after winning the German Indoor Championships in 1988.
