= Ilinca =

Ilinca is a Romanian given name. It is related to the names Elena and Ileana.
