= Edds =

Edds is a surname. Notable people with this surname include:

- A. J. Edds (born 1987), American American football linebacker
- Benita Edds (born 1958), American archer
- Ernie Edds (1926–2017), English football player
- Gareth Edds (born 1981), Australian football player

== See also ==
- EDDS, an aminopolycarboxylic acid
- EDDS, the ICAO code of Stuttgart Airport
