= Turkey at the 1988 Summer Olympics =

- IOC code: TUR
- NOC: Turkish National Olympic Committee

in Seoul
- Competitors: 41 in 9 sports
- Flag bearer: Ali Şahin
- Medals Ranked 27th: Gold 1 Silver 1 Bronze 0 Total 2

Summer Olympics appearances (overview)
- 1908; 1912; 1920; 1924; 1928; 1932; 1936; 1948; 1952; 1956; 1960; 1964; 1968; 1972; 1976; 1980; 1984; 1988; 1992; 1996; 2000; 2004; 2008; 2012; 2016; 2020; 2024

Other related appearances
- 1906 Intercalated Games

Turkey competed at the 1988 Summer Olympics in Seoul, South Korea.

== Medalists ==
Medal	Name	Sport	Event	Date
Gold	Naim Süleymanoğlu	Weightlifting	Men's 60 kg	20 September
Silver	Necmi Gençalp	Wrestling	Men's freestyle 82 kg	1 October

== Competitors ==
The following is the list of number of competitors in the Games.

Sport	Men	Women	Total
Archery	3	3	6
Athletics	3	1	4
Boxing	4	–	4
Judo	4	–	4
Sailing	2	0	2
Shooting	1	1	2
Swimming	2	0	2
Weightlifting	5	–	5
Wrestling	12	–	12
Total	36	5	41

== Results by event ==
=== Archery ===
In its second Olympic archery competition, Turkey was represented by three men and three women.

Women's Individual Competition:

- Huriye Eksi – Preliminary Round (→ 41st place)
- Elif Eksi – Preliminary Round (→ 42nd place)
- Selda Unsal – Preliminary Round (→ 50th place)

Men's Individual Competition:

- Vedat Erbay – 1/8 final (→ 22nd place)
- Kerem Ersu – Preliminary Round (→ 34th place)
- Izzet Avci – Preliminary Round (→ 61st place)

Women's Team Competition:

- Eksi, Eksi, and Unsal – Preliminary Round (→ 14th place)

Men's Team Competition:

- Erbay, Ersu, and Avci – Preliminary Round (→ 14th place)

== Athletics ==
Men
Track and road events

Athletes	Events	Final	
Athletes	Events	Time	Rank
Mehmet Terzi	Marathon	2:20.12	32
Ahmet Altun	Marathon	2:37.44	71

== Swimming ==
Men's 50m Freestyle

- Murat Tahir
  1. Heat – 24.64 (→ did not advance, 42nd place)
- Hakan Eskioğlu
  1. Heat – 25.24 (→ did not advance, 50th place)

Men's 100m Freestyle

- Murat Tahir
  1. Heat – 53.27 (→ did not advance, 44th place)
- Hakan Eskioğlu
  1. Heat – 53.95 (→ did not advance, 52nd place)

Men's 200m Freestyle

- Hakan Eskioğlu
  1. Heat – 1:58.45 (→ did not advance, 52nd place)

Men's 200m Individual Medley

- Hakan Eskioğlu
  1. Heat – 2:14.32 (→ did not advance, 52nd place)
