= Sam Tan =

Sam Tan or Sam Tân may refer to:

- Fireman Sam (original Welsh title: Sam Tân), a children's animation series
- Sam Tan (politician), Singaporean former politician
- Sam Tan (archer), Singaporean archer

== See also ==
- Samantha Tan, Canadian racing driver
