= Archery at the 1984 Summer Olympics – Women's individual =

Archery at the Olympics

Women's individual at the Games of the XXIII Olympiad
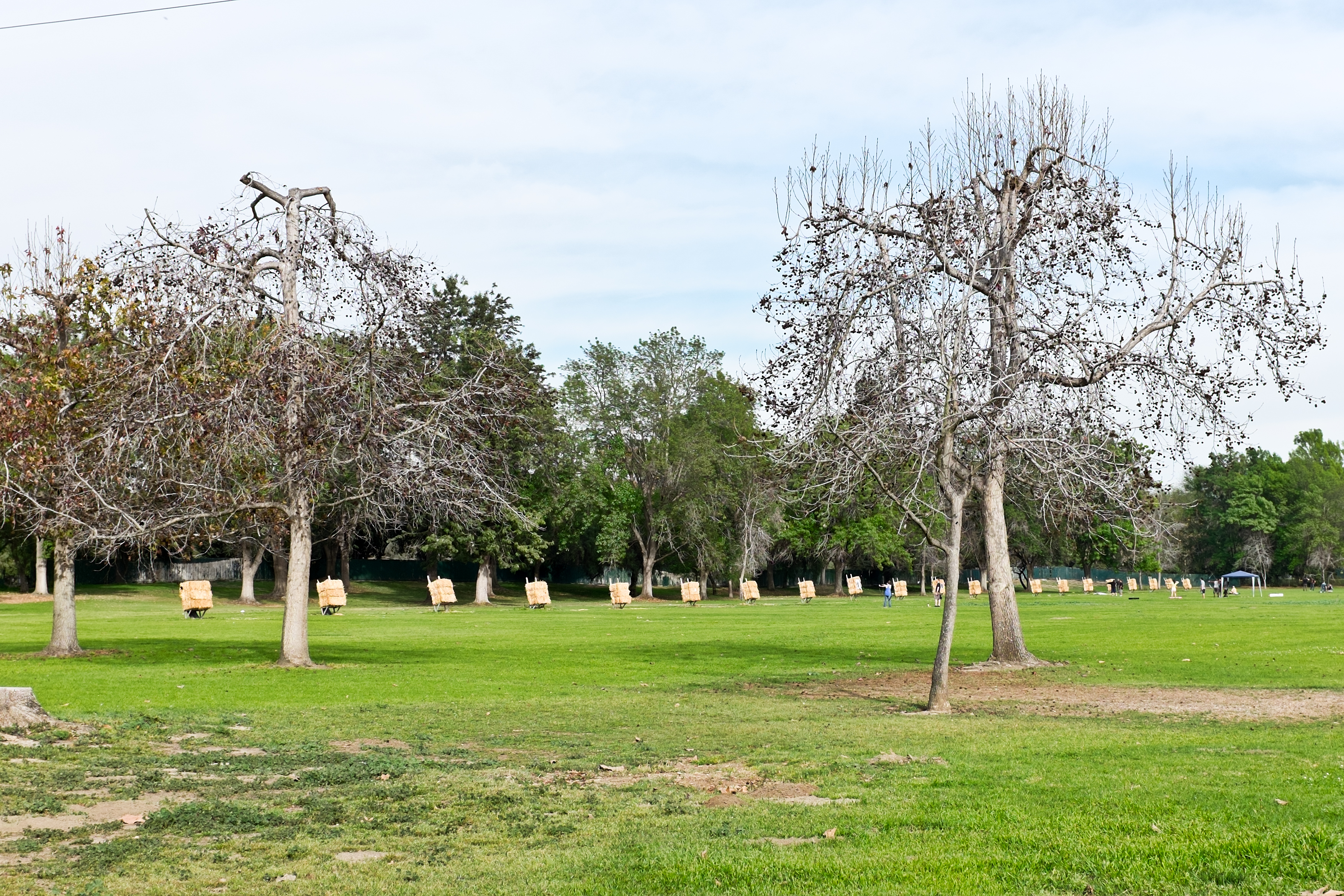
- Archery range at the El Dorado Regional Park, where the event took place
- Venue: El Dorado Park
- Dates: 8–11 August 1984
- Competitors: 47 from 24 nations
- Winning score: 2568

Medalists
| 1st place, gold medalist(s) | | Seo Hyang-soon | South Korea |
| 2nd place, silver medalist(s) | | Li Lingjuan | China |
| 3rd place, bronze medalist(s) | | Kim Jin-ho | South Korea |

The women's individual archery event at the 1984 Summer Olympics was part of the archery programme. The event consisted of a double FITA round. For each round, the archer shot 36 arrows at each of four distances—70, 60, 50, and 30 metres. The highest score for each arrow was 10 points, giving a possible maximum of 2880 points. Seven of the top eight archers were from nations that had been absent from the 1980 Summer Olympics.

Neroli Fairhall from New Zealand, who came 35th in this event, was the first paraplegic athlete in history to compete at the Olympic Games.

== Records ==
The following new Olympic records were set during this competition.

| Record | Round | Name | Nationality | Score | OR |
|---|---|---|---|---|---|
| Single FITA round | Second | Seo Hyang-soon | South Korea | 1293 | OR |
| Double FITA round | Combined | Seo Hyang-soon | South Korea | 2568 | OR |

== Results ==
| Rank | Archer | Nation | Round 1 Score | Round 1 Rank | Round 2 Score | Round 2 Rank | Total Score |
|---|---|---|---|---|---|---|---|
| 1st place, gold medalist(s) | Seo Hyang-soon | South Korea | 1275 | 3 | 1293 (OR) | 1 | 2568 (OR) |
| 2nd place, silver medalist(s) | Li Lingjuan | China | 1279 | 1 | 1280 | 2 | 2559 |
| 3rd place, bronze medalist(s) | Kim Jin-ho | South Korea | 1276 | 2 | 1279 | 3 | 2555 |
| 4 | Hiroko Ishizu | Japan | 1263 | 6 | 1261 | 4 | 2524 |
| 5 | Päivi Meriluoto | Finland | 1259 | 8 | 1250 | 8 | 2509 |
| 6 | Manuela Dachner | West Germany | 1260 | 7 | 1248 | 9 | 2508 |
| 7 | Trena King | United States | 1265 | 4 | 1243 | 11 | 2508 |
| 8 | Wu Yanan | China | 1240 | 12 | 1253 | 7 | 2493 |
| 9 | Aurora Bretón | Mexico | 1264 | 5 | 1217 | 19 | 2481 |
| 10 | Minako Hokari | Japan | 1241 | 11 | 1240 | 13 | 2481 |
| 11 | Doris Haas | West Germany | 1239 | 13 | 1241 | 12 | 2480 |
| 12 | Ruth Rowe | United States | 1223 | 18 | 1254 | 6 | 2477 |
| 13 | Ursula Hess | Switzerland | 1246 | 10 | 1227 | 16 | 2473 |
| 14 | Liselotte Andersson | Sweden | 1251 | 9 | 1217 | 20 | 2468 |
| 15 | Ulla Rantala | Finland | 1204 | 30 | 1256 | 5 | 2460 |
| 16 | Jeannette Goergen | Luxembourg | 1224 | 17 | 1228 | 15 | 2452 |
| 17 | Park Young-sook | South Korea | 1201 | 31 | 1244 | 10 | 2445 |
| 18 | Wang Jin | China | 1229 | 15 | 1216 | 21 | 2445 |
| 19 | Terene Donovan | Australia | 1222 | 19 | 1220 | 17 | 2442 |
| 20 | Hazel Greene | Ireland | 1221 | 20 | 1219 | 18 | 2440 |
| 21 | Esther Robertson | Italy | 1225 | 16 | 1210 | 24 | 2435 |
| 22 | Marie Claire van Stevens | Belgium | 1220 | 21 | 1211 | 22 | 2431 |
| 23 | Catharina Floris | Netherlands | 1211 | 27 | 1211 | 23 | 2422 |
| 24 | Ann Shurrock | New Zealand | 1218 | 23 | 1204 | 27 | 2422 |
| 25 | Linda Kazienko | Canada | 1220 | 22 | 1201 | 29 | 2421 |
| 26 | Ylva Iversson | Sweden | 1186 | 34 | 1234 | 14 | 2420 |
| 27 | Vreny Burger | Switzerland | 1215 | 24 | 1204 | 28 | 2419 |
| 28 | Montserrat Martín | Spain | 1212 | 26 | 1206 | 26 | 2418 |
| 29 | Eileen Robinson | Great Britain | 1198 | 32 | 1210 | 25 | 2408 |
| 30 | Angela Goodall | Great Britain | 1209 | 28 | 1192 | 30 | 2401 |
| 31 | Susan Willcox | Great Britain | 1231 | 14 | 1167 | 36 | 2398 |
| 32 | Ursula Valenta | Austria | 1215 | 25 | 1180 | 33 | 2395 |
| 33 | Lucille Lemay | Canada | 1205 | 29 | 1174 | 34 | 2379 |
| 34 | Benita Edds | United States | 1174 | 36 | 1192 | 31 | 2366 |
| 35 | Neroli Fairhall | New Zealand | 1167 | 38 | 1190 | 32 | 2357 |
| 36 | Wanda Sadegur | Canada | 1177 | 35 | 1172 | 35 | 2349 |
| 37 | Macy Lau | Hong Kong | 1162 | 39 | 1164 | 37 | 2326 |
| 38 | Ascension Guerra | Spain | 1174 | 37 | 1130 | 39 | 2304 |
| 39 | Mary Vaughan | Ireland | 1147 | 40 | 1151 | 38 | 2298 |
| 40 | Raymonde Verlinden | Belgium | 1189 | 33 | 1099 | 42 | 2288 |
| 41 | Joanna Agius | Malta | 1138 | 41 | 1102 | 41 | 2240 |
| 42 | Lu Jui Chiung | Chinese Taipei | 1114 | 43 | 1112 | 40 | 2226 |
| 43 | Sonam Chuki | Bhutan | 1122 | 42 | 1072 | 44 | 2194 |
| 44 | Rinzi Lham | Bhutan | 1106 | 44 | 1077 | 43 | 2183 |
| 45 | Ng Wing-Nga | Hong Kong | 1091 | 45 | 1057 | 45 | 2148 |
| 46 | Karma Chhoden | Bhutan | 1048 | 46 | 1038 | 46 | 2086 |
| 47 | Wong-Lau So-Han | Hong Kong | 1025 | 47 | 1031 | 47 | 2056 |
