= Joanne Franks =

British archer (born 1967)

Personal information
- Birth name: Joanne Marie Franks
- Born: 1 October 1967 (age 57); King's Lynn, England, UK

Sport
- Country: Great Britain
- Sport: Archery

Joanne Marie Franks-Edens (born 1 October 1967 in King's Lynn) is a British archer.

== Archery ==
Franks finished seventh at the 1988 Summer Olympic Games in the women's individual event. Alongside Pauline Edwards and Cheryl Sutton, she came fifth in the women's team event.

In the women's individual event at the 1992 Summer Olympic Games she finished 36th in the ranking round with 1264 points scored. As a result, she failed to qualify for the knockout stage. Along with Alison Williamson and Sylvia Harris, Great Britain lost 239–229 to Sweden in the round of sixteen and placed thirteenth in the women's team event.
