= Louis Valentin =

French journalist, novelist, and screenwriter

- Born: Louis Valentine; September 10, 1930; Gap, Hautes-Alpes
- Died: May 3, 2010 (aged 79); Antibes
- Occupations: Journalist, novelist and screenwriter

Louis Valentin (10 September 1930 – 3 May 2010), born Louis Valentine, was a French journalist, novelist, and screenwriter. He was born in Gap, Hautes-Alpes, and he lived in France until his death at Antibes.

He collaborated in several magazines: Paris Match, Lui and Marie-Claire. He lent his pen to many personalities, among which were Princess Soraya Esfandiary-Bakhtiari, Line Renaud and Marina Picasso. He was also the author of more personal works, in particular Chemin de Provence, in which he describes with humor and tenderness the occupation of France through the eyes of a child.

With characteristic versatility, Louis Valentine was press attaché for the musical comedy Hair, author of screenplays of films for television and the series, with his long-time collaborator Jean-Pierre Richard: Bonne fête maman (Happy Mother's Day), Marie Galante and Alice boit du petit lait (Alice drinks a little milk). He also collaborated in the review Des sourires et des hommes" (Of smiles and men).

== Literary works ==
=== Novels and essays ===
- Chemin de Provence, Simoën, 1977
- Les fiancés de l'impossible, Encre, 1979.
- Les roses de Dublin, Robert Laffont, 1981.
- 36-15, tapez : sexe, Robert Laffont, 1987.
- Monaco. un Album de famille, Ed. N°1, 1990.
- Les années rutabagas, Olivier Orban, 1993
- Piaf, l'ange noir, Plon, 1993
- Adam et Ève, Journal Intime, Plon, 1999

=== In collaboration ===
- Réné-Louis MAURICE, 5 milliards au boût de l'égout, Simoen, 1977
- Jean POGGI et Edouard DULLIN, Les vaches maigres, Encre, 1979
- Line RENAUD, Les brumes d'où je viens, LGF, 1990.
- Soraya ESFANDIARY BAKHTIARY, Le palais des solitudes, Editions N°1 / Michel Lafon, 1992.
- Soraya ESFANDIARY BAKHTIARY, La princesse d'argile, Robert Laffont, 1995.
- Line RENAUD, Maman, Éditions du Rocher, 1997.
- Mano DAYAK, Je suis né avec du sable dans les yeux, Fixot, 1998.
- Marina PICASSO, Grand-Père, Denöel, 2001.

== Television ==
=== Screenplays ===
- 1987 : Bonne fête, maman avec Marie-Christine Barrault, Howard Vernon.
- 1990 : Marie-Galante, quatre films tournés au Brésil et en Argentine avec Macha Méril, Florence Pernel
- 1992 : Alice boit du petit lait avec Odette Laure et Fiona Gélin
