= Marra (surname) =

Marra is a surname, and may refer to:

- Ada Marra (born 1973), Swiss politician
- Adelia Marra (born 1979), Italian speed skater
- Andrea Marra (born 1985), Korean American politician and human rights activist
- Anthony Marra (born 1984), American fiction writer
- Benjamin Marra (born 1977), American illustrator and comic-book artist
- Giovanni Marra (1931-2018), Roman Catholic Bishop of Usula
- Grace Marra (born 1959), American musician
- Harry Marra (born 1947), American track and field coach
- Ivna Marra (born 1990), Brazilian female volleyball player
- Jenny Marra (born 1977), Scottish Labour Party politician
- Joe Marra (born 1987), American professional lacrosse player
- Kenneth Marra (born 1951), United States District Judge of the United States District Court for the Southern District of Florida
- Marco Marra (born 1966), Canadian scientist
- Maria Clara Marra (born 1999), Brazilian politician.
- Michael Marra (singer-songwriter) (1952–2012), Scottish singer-songwriter and musician
- Michael Marra (politician) (born 1979), Scottish Labour politician
- Ninfa Marra (born 1974), Venezuelan former professional tennis player
- Placido della Marra (1560–1620), Italian Roman Catholic prelate, Bishop of Melfi e Rapolla
- Ralph J. Marra Jr. (born c. 1953), American lawyer
- Tracy Marra (born 1974), American politician
- Victor Marra Newland (1876–1953), Australian army officer and politician
- Vincenzo della Marra (1645–1712), Italian Roman Catholic prelate, Bishop of Alessano
- Vincenzo Marra (born 1972), Italian filmmaker
- William A. Marra (1928–1998), candidate for President of the United States in the 1988
