= Wu Yanan =

Wu Yanan may refer to:

- Wu Yanan (general) (born 1962), Chinese general
- Wu Yanan (archer) (born 1964), Chinese Olympic archer
- Wu Yanan (handballer) (born 1981), Chinese handball player
- Wu Yanan (canoeist) (born 1985), Chinese sprint canoeist
- Wu Yanan (wushu) (born 1986), Chinese wushu practitioner
- Wu Yanan (fighter) (born 1996), Chinese mixed martial artist
