= Nadia Gautschi =

Swiss archer (born 1954)

Personal information
- Nationality: Swiss
- Born: 20 April 1954 (age 72)

Sport
- Sport: Archery

Nadia Gautschi (born 20 April 1954) is a Swiss archer. She competed in the women's individual event at the 1988 Summer Olympics.
