= Toyoko Oku =

Japanese archer (born 1966)

Personal information
- Nationality: Japanese
- Born: 14 June 1966 (age 58)

Sport
- Sport: Archery

Toyoko Oku (born 14 June 1966) is a Japanese archer. She competed in the women's individual and team events at the 1988 Summer Olympics.
