= Chan Siu Yuk =

Hong Kong archer (born 1955)

Chan Siu Yuk (born 21 December 1955) is an archer from Hong Kong.

== Archery ==
She finished sixtieth at the 1988 Summer Olympic Games in the women's individual event with 1098 points.
