= Archery at the 1977 SEA Games =

Archery was introduced at the 1977 SEA Games and was held at the Petaling Jaya Club from Nov 23 to Nov 24 1977.

== Medal table ==
* Host nation (Malaysia)

Rank	Nation	Gold	Silver	Bronze	Total
1	Philippines (PHI)	6	2	4	12
2	Indonesia (INA)	5	2	2	9
3	Thailand (THA)	1	0	2	3
4	Singapore (SIN)	0	5	0	5
5	Malaysia (MAS)*	0	3	4	7
Totals (5 entries)		12	12	12	36

== Medalists ==
=== Recurve ===
Event	Gold	Silver	Bronze
Men's individual	Donald Pandiangan (INA)	Carlos Santos Jr. (PHI)	Cheng Jun (MAS)
Men's 90M	Carlos Santos Jr. (PHI)	Cheng Jun (MAS)	Vallop Potaya (THA)
Men's 70M	Carlos Santos Jr. (PHI)	Donald Pandiangan (INA)	Cheng Jun (MAS)
Men's 50M	Donald Pandiangan (INA)	Suhartomo (INA)	Raffy Recto (PHI)
Men's 30M	Donald Pandiangan (INA)	Cheng Jun (MAS)	Suhartomo (INA)
Men's team	Indonesia (INA)	Philippines (PHI)	Malaysia (MAS)
Women's individual	Jocelyn Guerrero (PHI)	Samantha Tan Pek Hoon (SIN)	Cheryll Ng Sok Ping (MAS)
Women's 70M	Suminar Rachmat (INA)	Cheryll Ng Sok Ping (MAS)	Jocelyn Guerrero (PHI)
Women's 60M	Amornrat Kaewbaidhoon (THA)	Samantha Tan Pek Hoon (SIN)	Jocelyn Guerrero (PHI)
Women's 50M	Jocelyn Guerrero (PHI)	Samantha Tan Pek Hoon (SIN)	Amornrat Kaewbaidhoon (THA)
Women's 30M	Jocelyn Guerrero (PHI)	Samantha Tan Pek Hoon (SIN)	Carla Ramos (PHI)
Women's team	Philippines (PHI)	Singapore (SIN)	Indonesia (INA)

== Results ==
=== Men ===
Country	Name	90m	70m	50m	30m	Total
Indonesia (INA)	Donald Pandiangan	261	306	316	345	1228
Philippines (PHI)	June Santos	276	306	310	335	1227
Malaysia (MAS)	Cheng Jun	273	302	301	339	1215
Indonesia (INA)	Suhartomo	255	297	312	339	1203
Philippines (PHI)	Raffy Recto	260	275	312	334	1181
Thailand (THA)	Vallop Potaya	270	281	277	337	1165
Indonesia (INA)	Adang Adjidji	245	295	286	334	1160
Singapore (SIN)	Michael Ng Yew Hui		301	299		1159
Thailand (THA)	Sa-Ngad K.		281	292		
Singapore (SIN)	Bill Wee Hock Kee				333	
Malaysia (MAS)	Remy Yap Lee Fui	247				
Indonesia (INA)	Mohammad Idrus			309		

=== Women ===
Country	Name	70m	60m	50m	30m	Total
Philippines (PHI)	Jojie Guerrero	272	289	294	325	1180
Singapore (SIN)	Sam Tan Pek Hoon	268	289	285	325	1167
Malaysia (MAS)	Cheryll Ng Sok Ping	279	287	269	322	1157
Philippines (PHI)	Carla Ramos	270	281	276	324	1151
Thailand (THA)	Amornrat Kaewbaidhoon	272	291	277	306	1146
Indonesia (INA)	Suminar Rachmat	279	283	270	313	1145
Singapore (SIN)	Maimona bt. Jayos	256	265	271	301	1093
Philippines (PHI)	Marinella Guerrero			265	307	1060
Philippines (PHI)	Margot Guerrero				320	
Indonesia (INA)	Leane Suviar		272			
Malaysia (MAS)	Sally Choo Poh Yin	249				
