= Montserrat Martín Moncusí =

Spanish archer (born 1966)

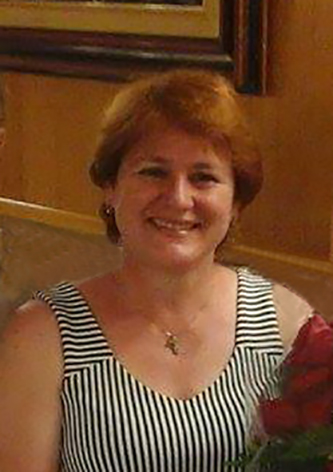
Martín in 2020

Montserrat Martín Moncusí (born 26 July 1966 in Montblanc) is a Spanish former archer.

== Archery ==
She competed at the World Archery Championships in 1983 and 1985 finishing 64th and 34th respectively.

At the 1984 Summer Olympic Games she came 28th with 2418 points in the women's individual event.

Martín retired in 1992. She later was awarded an "Insignia de oro y brillantes" from the Real Federación Española de Tiro con Arco.
