= Ilyana =

Ilyana is a female given name. Notable people with the name include:

- Illeana Douglas (born 1961), American actress
- Iliana Iotova (born 1964), Bulgarian politician
- Ilyana Kuziemko, American professor of economics
- Illyana Rasputina or Magik, comic character

== See also ==
- Ileana (disambiguation)
