= Minna Heinonen =

Finnish archer (born 1967)

Personal information
- National team: Finland
- Born: 26 August 1967 (age 57); Harjavalta, Finland

Sport
- Sport: Archery

Minna Kaarina Heinonen (born 26 August 1967 in Harjavalta) is a Finnish archer.

== Archery ==
Heinonen finished 56th at the 1988 Summer Olympics in the women's individual event with 1163 points. She also finished thirteenth in the women's team event as part of the Finland team.
