= Lu Jui Chiung =

Taiwanese archer

Lu Jui-Chiung (born 25 February 1964) is a Taiwanese archer.

== Archery ==
Lu competed in the 1984 Summer Olympic Games. She came 42nd with 2226 points scored in the women's individual event.
