= Suradi Rukimin =

Indonesian archer (born 1959)

Personal information
- Nationality: Indonesian
- Born: 28 October 1959 (age 66)

Sport
- Sport: Archery
Medal record
Men's recurve archery
Representing Indonesia
Asian Games
Silver medal – second place	1982 New Delhi	Men's team
SEA Games
Gold medal – first place	1983 Singapore	Men's 30m
Gold medal – first place	1983 Singapore	Men's 70m
Gold medal – first place	1983 Singapore	Men's team
Silver medal – second place	1983 Singapore	Individual
Silver medal – second place	1983 Singapore	Men's 50m
Silver medal – second place	1983 Singapore	Men's 90m

Suradi Rukimin (born 28 October 1959) is an Indonesian archer. He competed in the men's individual event at the 1984 Summer Olympics.
