= Archery Association of Singapore =

The Archery Association of Singapore is the National Sports Association for the sport of archery in Singapore. It is a member association with the world governing body for archery, World Archery Federation.

They organized archery at the SEA Games in 2022, and the Archery Asia Cup in 2023.
