= Brenda Cuming =

Canadian archer (born 1958)

Personal information
- Nationality: Canadian
- Born: 2 September 1958 (age 68) New Zealand

Sport
- Sport: Archery

Brenda Cuming (born 2 September 1958) is a Canadian archer. She competed in the women's individual event at the 1988 Summer Olympics.
