= Philippines at the 1995 SEA Games =

Philippines at the 1995 Southeast Asian Games
- IOC code: PHI
- NOC: Philippine Olympic Committee
- Website: www.olympic.ph (in English)

in Chiang Mai
- Competitors: 490 in 28 sports
- Medals Ranked 3rd: Gold 33 Silver 46 Bronze 64 Total 143

Southeast Asian Games appearances (overview)
- 1977; 1979; 1981; 1983; 1985; 1987; 1989; 1991; 1993; 1995; 1997; 1999; 2001; 2003; 2005; 2007; 2009; 2011; 2013; 2015; 2017; 2019; 2021; 2023; 2025; 2027; 2029

The Philippines participated at the 18th Southeast Asian Games held in Chiang Mai, Thailand from 9 to 17 December 1995.

== SEA Games performance ==
The Philippines ended up third overall, competing in 25 of 28 events contested. The Filipinos could only bring home 33 gold medals, short of the 57 they harvested in 1993 in what emerged as their second-worst performance in the biennial meet. It was a modest finish, this was how Philippine Sports Commission chair Philip Ella Juico assessed the results of the Philippine participation in the 18th SEA Games.

Elma Muros-Posadas, new queen of Philippine athletics, emerged as the most bemedalled Filipino athlete with three golds. Other Filipinos who excelled were Joselito Santos (cycling), Ryan Papa (swimming), Anecia Pedroso and John Baylon (judo), the Philippine men's basketball team, which kept the cage title by routing Thailand, 108–89, in the finals, Hector Begeo and Edward Lasquete (athletics), and Alvin de los Santos (weightlifting).

== Medalists ==
=== Gold ===
No.	Medal	Name	Sport	Event
1	Gold	Clint Sayo	Archery	Men's individual recurve
2	Gold	Joann Chan Tabanag	Archery	Women's individual recurve
3	Gold	Philippines	Basketball	Men's team
4	Gold	Raymond Papa	Swimming	Men's 100m backstroke
5	Gold	Raymond Papa	Swimming	Men's 200m backstroke

=== Silver ===
No.	Medal	Name	Sport	Event
1	Silver	Philippines	Basketball	Women's team
2	Silver	Jean Elaine	Diving	Women's 3m springboard
3	Silver	Raymond Papa	Swimming	Men's 200m freestyle
4	Silver	Robert Angelo; Joseph Lizardo; Sofronio Palahang	Tennis	Men's team
5	Silver	Ramon Solis	Weightlifting	Men's Weightlifting

=== Bronze ===
No.	Medal	Name	Sport	Event
1	Bronze	Oscart Brione; Clint Sayo; Gil Gabriel	Archery	Men's team recurve
2	Bronze	Joseph Lizardo	Tennis	Men's singles
3	Bronze	Sofronio Palahang; Robert Angelo	Tennis	Men's doubles
4	Bronze	Jennifer Saret; Maricris Fernandez	Tennis	Women's doubles
5	Bronze	Jennifer Saret; Maricris Fernandez	Tennis	Women's team
6	Bronze	Philippines	Water Polo	Men's team

=== Multiple ===
Name	Sport	1st place, gold medalist(s)	2nd place, silver medalist(s)	3rd place, bronze medalist(s)	Total
Raymond Papa	Swimming	2	1	0	3
Clint Sayo	Archery	1	0	1	2
Joseph Lizardo	Tennis	0	1	1	2
Robert Angelo	Tennis	0	1	1	2
Sofronio Palahang	Tennis	0	1	1	2
Jennifer Saret	Tennis	0	0	2	2
Maricris Fernandez	Tennis	0	0	2	2

== Medal summary ==
=== By sports ===
Sport	Gold	Silver	Bronze	Total
Shooting	5	9	6	20
Athletics	5	1	5	11
Taekwondo	3	5	4	12
Judo	2	6	2	10
Bowling	2	3	3	8
Golf	2	2	0	4
Swimming	2	1	2	5
Equestrian	2	1	1	4
Archery	2	0	1	3
Boxing	1	6	5	12
Gymnastics	1	3	6	10
Cycling	1	1	2	4
Basketball	1	1	0	2
Fencing	1	0	7	8
Weightlifting	1	0	5	6
Billiards and snooker	0	3	1	4
Sailing	0	2	2	4
Tennis	0	1	4	5
Volleyball	0	1	0	1
Silat Olahraga	0	0	2	2
Squash	0	0	2	2
Totals (21 entries)	31	46	60	137
