= Ilse Martha Ries-Hotz =

Luxembourgish archer (born 1949)

Personal information
- Nationality: Luxembourgish
- Born: 27 July 1949 (age 75); Schwarzenbach, Germany

Sport
- Sport: Archery

Ilse Martha Ries-Hotz (born 27 July 1949) is a Luxembourgish archer. She competed in the women's individual event at the 1988 Summer Olympics.
