= Ulla Rantala =

Finnish archer (born 1957)

Personal information
- Born: May 1, 1957 (age 67); Tammela, Finland

Sport
- Country: Finland
- Sport: Archery

Ulla Margit Rantala (born 1 May 1957 in Tammela) is a Finnish archer.

== Career ==
She competed at the World Archery Championships in 1981 and 1983. In 1981 she finished eighth in the team event and 49th in the individual event. Two years later Rantala came 45th individually.

At the 1984 Summer Olympic Games she came 15th with 2460 points in the women's individual event.
