= Kyoko Kitahara =

Japanese archer (born 1951)

Personal information
- Nationality: Japanese
- Born: 20 August 1951 (age 75)

Sport
- Sport: Archery

Kyoko Kitahara (北原京子, Kitahara Kyoko; born 20 August 1951) is a Japanese archer. She competed in the women's individual and team events at the 1988 Summer Olympics.
