= Gloria Rosa =

Puerto Rican archer (born 1958)

Personal information
- Nationality: Puerto Rican
- Born: 4 February 1958 (age 67)

Sport
- Sport: Archery

Gloria Rosa (born 4 February 1958) is a Puerto Rican archer. She competed in the women's individual event at the 1988 Summer Olympics, coming in 54th.
