= Liselotte Andersson =

Swedish archer (born 1961)

Agneta Liselotte "Lisa" Andersson (born 31 August 1961, in Malmö) is a Swedish archer.

== Archery ==
Andersson won a bronze medal at the 1983 World Archery Championships.

She competed at the 1984 Summer Olympic Games in the women's individual event and finished fourteenth with 2468 points scored.

At the 1988 Summer Olympic Games she came thirteenth in the women's individual event and seventh in the women's team event.
