= Mary Vaughan =

Irish archer (born 1953)

Mary Vaughan (born 7 March 1953) is an Irish archer.

== Archery ==
Vaughan competed at the World Archery Championships in 1983, 1985 and 1989 finishing 68th, 46th and 88th respectively.

At the 1984 Summer Olympic Games she came 39th with 2298 points scored in the women's individual event.
