= Ascension Guerra =

Spanish archer (born 1955)

Ascension Guerra Gonzalez (born 28 February 1955 in Madrid) is a Spanish archer.

== Archery ==
She took part in three World Archery Championships and had a highest finish of 58th.

At the 1984 Summer Olympic Games she came 38th with 2304 points scored in the women's individual event.
