= Archery at the 1985 SEA Games =

Archery at the 1985 SEA Games was held at Football Field, Sport Authority of Thailand Sport Complex, Bangkok, Thailand. The archery was held between December 12 to December 15.

== Results (Individual) ==
Event	Gold	Silver	Bronze
Men's	(Indonesia) Adang Adjidji	(Indonesia) Suradi Rukimin	(Thailand) Sununt Tokahuta
Men's ARSM 30	(Indonesia) Adang Adjidji	(Indonesia) Suradi Rukimin	(Thailand) Sununt Tokahuta
Men's ARSM 50	(Indonesia) Adang Adjidji	(Indonesia) Suradi Rukimin	(Indonesia) Iman Sugirman
Men's ARSM 70	(Indonesia) Adang Adjidji	(Indonesia) Suradi Rukimin	(Thailand) Sununt Tokahuta
Men's ARSM 90	(Indonesia) Suradi Rukimin	(Indonesia) Adang Adjidji	(Thailand) Amphol Amarekajorn
Men's Team	Indonesia	Thailand	Singapore
Women's	(Philippines) Joann Chan	(Indonesia) Kusuma Wardhani	(Philippines) Karla Cabrera
Women's ARSF 30	(Philippines) Joann Chan	(Indonesia) Kusuma Wardhani	(Philippines) Karla Cabrera
Women's ARSF 50	(Indonesia) Kusuma Wardhani	(Philippines) Joann Chan	(Philippines) Karla Cabrera
Women's ARSF 60	(Indonesia) Kusuma Wardhani	(Philippines) Joann Chan	(Philippines) Karla Cabrera
Women's ARSF 70	(Indonesia) Kusuma Wardhani	(Philippines) Joann Chan	(Philippines) Karla Cabrera
Women's Team	Philippines	Indonesia	Thailand
