= Susan Willcox =

British archer (born 1954)

Susan E. Willcox (born 6 April 1954 in Bristol) is a British archer.

== Archery ==
She took part in the 1983 World Archery Championships and finished 52nd individually and twelfth in the team event.

Willcox competed at the 1984 Summer Olympic Games and came 31st in the women's individual event with a total of 2398 points.
