= Archery at the 1995 SEA Games =

Archery at the 1995 SEA Games was held at Football Field, Chiang Mai University, Chiang Mai, Thailand. The archery was held between December 11 to December 15.

== Medal table ==
* Host nation (Thailand)

Rank	Nation	Gold	Silver	Bronze	Total
1	Indonesia (INA)	2	1	2	5
2	Philippines (PHI)	2	0	1	3
3	Thailand (THA)*	0	2	1	3
4	Malaysia (MAS)	0	1	0	1
Totals (4 entries)		4	4	4	12

== Medal summary ==
=== Men ===
Event	Gold	Silver	Bronze
Individual recurve	Clint Sayo; Philippines	Hendra Setijawan; Indonesia	Ditto Rembran; Indonesia
Team recurve	Indonesia (INA); Hendra Setijawan; Syafrudin Mawi; Wahyu Hidayat	Thailand (THA); Worapoth Doungcharen; Pipat Talubkaew; Prayad Mookdaon	Philippines (PHI); Oscar Briones; Clint Sayo; Gil Grabriel

=== Women ===
Event	Gold	Silver	Bronze
Individual recurve	Joann Tabang; Philippines	Wadsana Saikongdee; Thailand	Danahuri Dahliana; Indonesia
Team recurve	Indonesia (INA); Nurfitriyana Lantang; Hamdiah Damanhuri; Danahuri Dahliana	Malaysia (MAS); Nor Resah Abdul Rasiad; Wan Nornidawati; Siti Aisah Sudin	Thailand (THA); Wadsana Saikongdee; Surang Thaolipoh; Somnuk Suerkanong

Preceded by 1993	Archery at the SEA Games; 1995 SEA Games	Succeeded by 1997
