= Esther Robertson =

Italian archer (born 1952)

Personal information
- Nationality: Italian
- Born: 29 October 1952 (age 72); Trieste, Italy

Sport
- Sport: Archery

Esther Candotti (née Robertson) (born 29 October 1952, in Trieste) is an Italian former archer.

== Archery ==
She competed at the 1984 Summer Olympic Games in the women's individual event and finished 21st with 2435 points scored.

== Family ==
Her son Erik Candotti is also an archer.
