= Macy Lau =

Hong Kong archer

Lan Fong Macy Lau (born 27 June 1956) is an archer from Hong Kong.

== Archery ==
Lau took part in the 1983 World Archery Championships and finished in 76th position.

She competed in the 1984 Summer Olympic Games and finished 37th with 2326 points scored in the women's individual event.
