= Philippines at the 1977 SEA Games =

Philippines at the 1977 Southeast Asian Games
- IOC code: PHI
- NOC: Philippine Olympic Committee
- Website: www.olympic.ph (in English)

in Kuala Lumpur
- Medals Ranked 3rd: Gold 31 Silver 30 Bronze 30 Total 91

Southeast Asian Games appearances (overview)
- 1977; 1979; 1981; 1983; 1985; 1987; 1989; 1991; 1993; 1995; 1997; 1999; 2001; 2003; 2005; 2007; 2009; 2011; 2013; 2015; 2017; 2019; 2021; 2023; 2025; 2027; 2029

In the 1977 edition, the Philippines together with Brunei and Indonesia were finally admitted into the SEAP Games Federation and all debuted in the now so-called Southeast Asian Games. The word "Peninsula" was omitted as a new federation title to reflect the expansion. All three debutant countries participated in the 9th Southeast Asian Games that was held from 19 to 26 November 1977 at Kuala Lumpur, Malaysia.

== Medalists ==
=== Gold ===
No.	Medal	Name	Sport	Event
1	Gold	Carlos Santos Jr.	Archery	Men's 90m recurve
2	Gold	Carlos Santos Jr.	Archery	Men's 70m recurve
3	Gold	Jocelyn Guerrero	Archery	Women's individual recurve
4	Gold	Jocelyn Guerrero	Archery	Women's 50m recurve
5	Gold	Jocelyn Guerrero	Archery	Women's 30m recurve
6	Gold	Philippines	Archery	Women's team recurve
7	Gold	Erlinda Lavandia	Athletics	Women's javelin throw
8	Gold	Anthony Dasalla; Bernardo Carpio; Jaime Javier; Ely Capacio; Jaime Manansala; Renato Lobo; Ramon Cruz; Angelito Ladores; Matthew Gaston; Alex Clarino; Joseph Herrera; Paul Velasco; Coach: Honesto Mayoralgo	Basketball	Men's team
9	Gold	Reynaldo Fortaleza	Boxing	Featherweight
10	Gold	Ruben Mares	Boxing	Lightweight
11	Gold	Fernando Cruz	Boxing	Welterweight
12	Gold	Jairulla Jaitulla	Swimming	Men's 100m breaststroke
13	Gold	Philippines	Volleyball	Women's team

=== Silver ===
No.	Medal	Name	Sport	Event
1	Silver	Carlos Santos Jr.	Archery	Men's individual recurve
2	Silver	Philippines	Archery	Men's team recurve
3	Silver	Elmer Reyes	Athletics	Men's high jump
4	Silver	Susano Erang	Athletics	Men's shot put
5	Silver	Lydia Silva-Netto	Athletics	Women's long jump
6	Silver	Delia Orquillas	Athletics	Women's high jump
7	Silver	Consuelo Lacusong	Athletics	Women's shot put
8	Silver	Consuelo Lacusong	Athletics	Women's discus throw
9	Silver	Alan Jardinel	Boxing	Flyweight
10	Silver	Rogelio Fortaleza	Boxing	Bantamweight
11	Silver	Mark Joseph	Swimming	Men's 400m freestyle
12	Silver	Mark Joseph	Swimming	Men's 1500m freestyle
13	Silver	Jairulla Jaitulla	Swimming	Men's 200m breaststroke
14	Silver	Philippines	Swimming	Men's 4 × 200 m freestyle relay
15	Silver	Nancy Deano	Swimming	Women's 100m freestyle
16	Silver	Nancy Deano	Swimming	Women's 200m breaststroke
17	Silver	Marissa Sanchez	Tennis	Women's singles
18	Silver	Philippines	Volleyball	Men's team

=== Bronze ===
No.	Medal	Name	Sport	Event
1	Bronze	Raffy Recto	Archery	Men's 50m recurve
2	Bronze	Jocelyn Guerrero	Archery	Women's 70m recurve
3	Bronze	Jocelyn Guerrero	Archery	Women's 60m recurve
4	Bronze	Carla Ramos	Archery	Women's 30m recurve
5	Bronze	Tito Tulanan	Athletics	Men's 800m
6	Bronze	Gloria Acedo	Athletics	Women's 100m
7	Bronze	Arsenia Sagaray	Athletics	Women's 3000m
8	Bronze	Lucia Tolentino	Athletics	Women's 200m hurdles
9	Bronze	Nanette Lusterio	Athletics	Women's pentathlon
10	Bronze	Jairulla Jaitulla	Swimming	Men's 200m freestyle
11	Bronze	Vicente Cheng	Swimming	Men's 400m freestyle
12	Bronze	Kemalpasa Umih	Swimming	Men's 100m breaststroke
13	Bronze	Kemalpasa Umih	Swimming	Men's 200m breaststroke
14	Bronze	Jairulla Jaitulla	Swimming	Men's 400m individual medley
15	Bronze	Philippines	Swimming	Men's 4 × 100 m freestyle relay
16	Bronze	Philippines	Swimming	Women's 4 × 100 m freestyle relay
17	Bronze	Ruby Chiongbian; Gladys Imperial; Marissa Sanchez; Pia Tamayo	Tennis	Women's team
18	Bronze	Ramon Solis	Weightlifting	Men's Weightlifting

=== Multiple ===
Name	Sport	1st place, gold medalist(s)	2nd place, silver medalist(s)	3rd place, bronze medalist(s)	Total
Carlos Santos Jr.	Archery	3	1	0	4
Jocelyn Guerrero	Archery	3	0	2	5
Jairulla Jaitulla	Swimming	1	1	2	4
Consuelo Lacusong	Athletics	0	2	0	2
Mark Joseph	Swimming	0	2	0	2
Nancy Deano	Swimming	0	2	0	2
Marissa Sanchez	Tennis	0	1	1	2
Kemalpasa Umih	Swimming	0	0	2	2
