= Archery at the 1987 SEA Games =

Archery events was held between 13 September to 15 September at Senayan Sports Complex.

== Medal table ==
Rank	Nation	Gold	Silver	Bronze	Total
1	Indonesia (INA)	11	10	5	26
2	Philippines (PHI)	1	2	2	5
3	Thailand (THA)	1	1	5	7
4	Singapore (SIN)	0	0	1	1
Totals (4 entries)		13	13	13	39

== Medal summary ==
=== Men ===
Event	Gold		Silver		Bronze	
Double Fita 30m	(Indonesia) Donald Pandiangan	673 pts	(Indonesia) Syafruddin Mawi	672	(Indonesia) Adang Adjidji	671
Men's 50m	(Thailand) Amphol Amalekajorn	315 pts	(Indonesia) Syafruddin Mawi	309	(Indonesia) Adang Adjidji	305
Men's 70m	(Indonesia) Adang Adjidji	622 pts	(Indonesia) Donald Pandiangan	613	(Thailand) Amphol Amalekajorn	603
Men's 90m	(Indonesia) Adang Adjidji	575 pts (rec)	(Indonesia) Donald Pandiangan	553	(Thailand) Amphol Amalekajorn	533
Grand Total	(Indonesia) Adang Adjidji	2.472 pts	(Indonesia) Donald Pandiangan	2432	(Thailand) Amphol Amalekajorn	2430
Team	Indonesia	7.313 pts	Thailand	7.106	Singapore	6.938

=== Women ===
Event	Gold		Silver		Bronze	
Double Fita 30m	(Indonesia) Nurfitriyana Saiman	669 pts	(Indonesia) Fitrizal Iriani	666	(Indonesia) Kusuma Wardhani	664
Double Fita 50m	(Philippines) Joanna Chan	606 pts	(Indonesia) Nurfitriyana Saiman	603	(Indonesia) Kusuma Wardhani	603
Women's 60m	(Indonesia) Nurfitriyana Saiman	629 pts	(Indonesia) Fitrizal Iriani	614	(Indonesia) Kusuma Wardhani	614
Women's 70m	(Indonesia) Kusuma Wardhani	621 pts (rec)	(Indonesia) Nurfitriyana Saiman	583	(Philippines) Helia Patracios	582
Grand Total	(Indonesia) Kusuma Wardhani	2.502	(Indonesia) Nurfitriyana Saiman	2.484	(Philippines) Joanna Chan	2.449
Team	Indonesia	4.593 pts	Philippines	4.353	Thailand	4.329
Double Fita team	Indonesia	7.398 pts	Philippines	7.085	Thailand	7.025
