= Archery at the 1981 SEA Games =

- Venue: Manila Polo Club
- Location: Makati, Philippines
- Dates: 10 December – 13 December

Archery at the 1981 SEA Games was held at the Manila Polo Club in Makati, Philippines from 10 to 13 December.

== Medal summary ==
Event	Gold		Silver		Bronze	
Men's individual	(Indonesia) Donald Pandiangan	1.240 pts	(Philippines) Carlos Santos	1.200	(Indonesia) Hendra Gunawan	1.199
Men's 30 m	(Indonesia) Donald Pandiangan	679 pts	(Philippines) Carlos Santos	677	(Indonesia) Hendra Gunawan	675
Men's 50 m	(Indonesia) Donald Pandiangan	639 pts	(Philippines) Carlos Santos	630	(Indonesia) Tatang Budiman	611
Men's 70 m	(Indonesia) Donald Pandiangan	621 pts	(Indonesia) Hendra Gunawan	604	(Thailand) Banchoong Dosanee	604
Men's 90 m	(Indonesia) Donald Pandiangan	556 pts	(Thailand) Vallop Pottaya	529	(Philippines) Carlos Santos	529
Team	(Indonesia) INDONESIA	3.625 pts	(Thailand) THAILAND	3.592	(Philippines) PHILIPPINES	3.550
Women's individual	(Thailand) Amornrat Kaewbadihoon	1.223 pts	(Indonesia) Nurfitriyana Saiman	1.184	(Thailand) Tokahuta	1.159
Women's 30 m	(Thailand) Amornrat Kaewbadihoon	646 pts	(Philippines) Ramos	644	(Indonesia) Nurfitriyana Saiman	635
Women's 50 m	(Thailand) Amornrat Kaewbadihoon	599 pts	(Thailand) Jariya Jingjit	575	(Singapore) Christina Law	572
Women's 60 m	(Indonesia) Nurfitriyana Saiman	624 pts	(Thailand) Amornrat Kaewbadihoon	621	(Indonesia) Dhamayanti Adhidarma	595
Women's 70 m	(Thailand) Amornrat Kaewbadihoon	607 pts	(Indonesia) Nurfitriyana Saiman	572	(Philippines) Cherrie Valera	552
Team	(Thailand) THAILAND	3.532 pts	(Indonesia) INDONESIA	3.455	(Philippines) PHILIPPINES	3.385

== Medal table ==
Rank	Nation	Gold	Silver	Bronze	Total
1	Indonesia (INA)	7	4	5	16
2	Thailand (THA)	5	4	2	11
3	Philippines (PHI)	0	4	4	8
4	Singapore (SIN)	0	0	1	1
Totals (4 entries)		12	12	12	36
