= Marie-Josée Bazin =

French archer (born 1952)

Personal information
- Nationality: French
- Born: 3 May 1952 (age 72); Avignon, France

Sport
- Sport: Archery

Marie-Josée Bazin (born 3 May 1952) is a French archer. She competed in the women's individual and team events at the 1988 Summer Olympics.
