= Basilisa Ygnalaga =

Filipino archer

Personal information
- Nationality: Filipino
- Born: June 30, 1967 (age 58)
- Height: 5 ft 4 in (163 cm)
- Weight: 99 lb (45 kg)

Sport
- Sport: Archery

Basilisa Ygnalaga (born June 30, 1967) is a Filipino archer. She competed in the women's individual event at the 1988 Summer Olympics.
