= Cheryl Sutton =

British archer (born 1946)

Cheryl A. Sutton (born 23 September 1946 in Norwich) is a British archer.

== Archery ==
Sutton finished 51st at the 1988 Summer Olympic Games in the women's individual event with 1179 points. She also finished fifth in the women's team event.
