= Ampol Amaluktipituk =

Thai archer (born 1950)

Personal information
- Nationality: Thai
- Born: 14 January 1950 (age 75)

Sport
- Sport: Archery

Ampol Amaluktipituk (born 14 January 1950) is a Thai archer. He competed in the men's individual event at the 1984 Summer Olympics.
