= Selda Ünsal =

Turkish archer (born 1970)

Personal information
- Nationality: Turkish
- Born: 1 January 1970 (age 55)

Sport
- Sport: Archery

Selda Ünsal (born 1 January 1970) is a Turkish archer. She competed in the women's individual and team events at the 1988 Summer Olympics.
