= Wu Yanan (archer) =

Chinese archer (born 1964)

Wu Yanan (born 7 December 1964) is a Chinese archer.

== Archery ==
She competed at the 1984 Summer Olympic Games in the women's individual event and finished eighth with 2493 points scored.
