= Murat Tahir =

Turkish swimmer

Personal information
- Full name: Murat Tahir
- Nationality: Turkish Canadian
- Born: 12 March 1964 (age 62) Beijing, China
- Height: 1.80 m (5 ft 11 in)
- Weight: 72 kg (159 lb)

Sport
- Sport: Swimming

Murat Tahir (born 12 March 1964) is a Chinese Turkish, and Turkey former swimmer. He competed in two events at the 1988 Summer Olympics Murat resettled in Canada in 2014.
