= Kusuma Wardhani =

Indonesian archer (1964–2023)

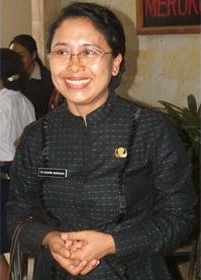
- Wardhani in 2015

Personal information
- Born: 20 February 1964 Makassar, Indonesia
- Died: 12 November 2023 (aged 59) Makassar, Indonesia
- Height: 153 cm (5 ft 0 in)
- Weight: 48 kg (106 lb)
- Spouse: Adang Adjidji (m. 1988)

Sport
- Sport: Archery
- Event: Recurve
- Coached by: Donald Pandiangan
Medal record
Women's archery
Representing Indonesia
Olympic Games
Silver medal – second place	1988 Seoul	Women's team
SEA Games
Gold medal – first place	1985 Bangkok	Women's 50m
Gold medal – first place	1985 Bangkok	Women's 60m
Gold medal – first place	1985 Bangkok	Women's 70m
Gold medal – first place	1987 Jakarta	Women's 70m
Gold medal – first place	1987 Jakarta	Grand total
Gold medal – first place	1987 Jakarta	Women's team
Gold medal – first place	1987 Jakarta	Double fita team
Silver medal – second place	1985 Bangkok	Individual
Silver medal – second place	1985 Bangkok	Women's 30m
Silver medal – second place	1985 Bangkok	Women's team
Silver medal – second place	1997 Jakarta	Individual
Bronze medal – third place	1987 Jakarta	Double fita 30m
Bronze medal – third place	1987 Jakarta	Double fita 50m
Bronze medal – third place	1987 Jakarta	Women's 60m

Kusuma Wardhani (20 February 1964 – 12 November 2023) was an Indonesian archer and an Olympic silver medallist. Together with Nurfitriyana Saiman and Lilies Handayani she won the women's team silver medal at the 1988 Olympics, bringing the first ever Olympic medal to Indonesia. In the 1980s, Wardhani won multiple medals in individual recurve events at the SEA Games. After retiring from competitions she headed the Education, Youth and Sports Office of Bali.

Wardhani died on 12 November 2023, at the age of 59.

== In popular culture ==
- Portrayed by Tara Basro in the 2016 Indonesian film 3 Srikandi.
