= Doris Haas =

German archer (born 1964)

Doris Haas (born 27 December 1964 in Gengenbach) is a German former archer.

== Archery ==
Haas won a silver medal in the women's team event at the 1983 World Archery Championships and a bronze at the 1985 World Archery Championships representing West Germany.

At the 1984 Summer Olympic Games she came eleventh with 2480 points scored in the women's individual event. During the 1988 Summer Olympic Games she finished 32nd in the women's individual event and sixth in the women's team event.
