= Huriye Ekşi =

Turkish archer (born 1969)

Personal information
- Nationality: Turkish
- Born: 1 March 1969 (age 56)

Sport
- Sport: Archery

Huriye Ekşi (born 1 March 1969) is a Turkish archer. She competed in the women's individual and team events at the 1988 Summer Olympics.
