= Marie-Claire Nseng-Elang =

Attorney General at the Supreme Court of Cameroon
- Incumbent
- Assumed office November 20, 2025
- Preceded by: Luc Ndjodo

Personal details
- Born: Marie-Claire Dieudonnée Nseng-Elang; June 20, 1961 (age 65) Mbankomo, Centre Region, Cameroon
- Citizenship: Cameroon
- Children: 4
- Education: University of Yaoundé; National School of Administration and Magistracy
- Occupation: Magistrate, jurist
- Known for: First woman appointed attorney general at the Supreme Court of Cameroon
- Awards: Officer of the Order of Valour

Marie-Claire Dieudonné Nseng-Elang, by which she is named, was born on June 20, 1961, in Mbankomo in the Mefou-et-Akomo department located in the Centre Region, Cameroon. President Paul Biya has appointed Marie Claire Dieudonnée Nseng Elang as attorney general at the Supreme Court of Cameroon, making her the first woman to hold the prestigious position.

The appointment, made by a decree signed on November 20, 2025, sees her succeed magistrate Luc Ndjodo, who died on August 1, at the age of 72.

Before her nomination, the high-ranking magistrate served as Director of General Affairs at the Ministry of Justice of Cameroon, a position she had held since August 2020. A graduate of the National School of Administration and Magistracy (ENAM), she also sat on its board of directors by virtue of a presidential decree signed in March 2019.

Nseng Elang was promoted to Officer of the Order of Valour by presidential decree on November 27, 2024.

== Biography ==
=== Studies and beginnings ===
Marie-Claire Nseng-Elang completed her secondary education at the Sacred Heart College in Makak, in the Nyong-et-Kéllé department, located 80 km (50 mi) from Yaoundé, and later at the Retirement College in Yaoundé.

She pursued her higher education at the University of Yaoundé, where she earned a degree in private law before passing the entrance exam for the National School of Administration and Magistracy in 1986, from which she graduated as a magistrate in 1988.

=== Career ===
She began her career in 1988 as a deputy prosecutor at the courts of first instance and high court of Yaoundé, a post she held until 1994. She then exercised the same responsibilities in Mbalmayo before returning to the capital. In 2001, she was appointed controller at the Judicial Services Inspectorate, then promoted to inspector at the General Inspectorate of Judicial Services in 2012.

She remained at the Ministry of Justice of Cameroon until her appointment, having previously served as inspector general in 2012 and Director of General Affairs in 2020. Furthermore, she was promoted to the rank of Senior Magistrate.

=== Significance and impact ===
Her appointment was celebrated as a symbol of gender inclusion and professional merit within Cameroon's legal system. It fulfilled Biya's post-2025 pledge to elevate women to high public offices. As head of the national prosecution service, she oversees the coordination of prosecutors, supervision of criminal policy, and review of major administrative and disciplinary cases before the Supreme Court of Cameroon.

=== Personal and professional values ===
Known for her discipline, discretion, and integrity, Nseng-Elang has been praised for her administrative acumen and ethical rigor. A mother of four and member of the Cameroonian Association of Women Jurists, she also advocates for women's empowerment in the judiciary and broader society.

== Notes ==
1. "Paul Biya Creates Surprise: Marie-Claire Dieudonnée Nseng-Elang Appointed Prosecutor General at the Supreme Court," on CamerounWeb, consulted on January 24, 2026.
2. "Marie-Claire Dieudonnée Nseng-Elang Becomes the First Female Prosecutor General at the Supreme Court," on StopBlablaCam, consulted on January 24, 2026.
3. Cameroon Tribune, "Cameroon: Sacred Heart College of Makak – A New Beginning," free access, on AllAfrica, October 5, 2021, consulted on January 24, 2026.
4. Cfeditorfr, "Marie-Claire Nseng Elang, First Female Prosecutor General," on Cameroun, November 26, 2025, consulted on January 24, 2026.
5. "The Appointment of Madame Nseng Elang Marie-Claire Dieudonné: A Step Toward Gender Equality in Cameroon," on Proxima Info, November 21, 2025, consulted on January 24, 2026.
6. Alain-Claude Ndom, "Cameroon – Historic Appointment: A Woman Takes the Head of the Office of the Prosecutor General," on 237online.com, November 21, 2025, consulted on January 27, 2026.
