= María Teresa Valdés =

Spanish archer (1961–2003)

Personal information
- Full name: María Teresa Valdés Estrada
- Nationality: Spanish
- Born: 11 April 1961; Lugones, Spain
- Died: 1 June 2003 (aged 42)

Sport
- Sport: Archery

María Teresa Valdés Estrada (11 April 1961 – 1 June 2003) was a Spanish archer. She competed in the women's individual event at the 1988 Summer Olympics.
