= Iliana Ortega =

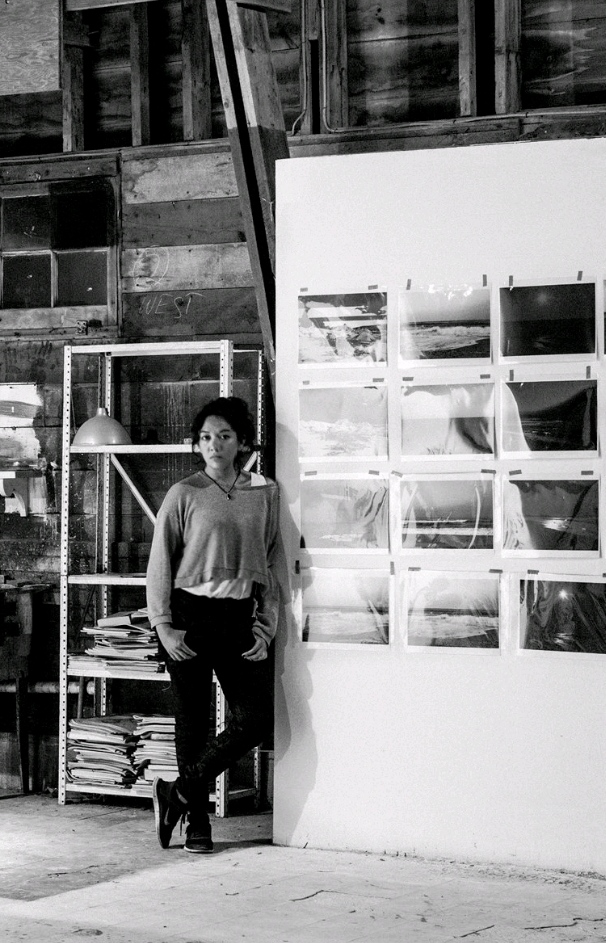
- Iliana Ortega
- Born: Mexico City
- Education: Yale School of Art (MFA)
- Occupation: Visual Artist

Iliana Ortega (born in Mexico City, Mexico) is a contemporary visual artist who works with photography, painting, drawing, site-specific installation, and video.

== Biography ==
Ortega spent the first ten years of her career using the language of site-specific installation by combining elements from painting and abstract drawing. Since 2010 Iliana has been specializing in photography, using conceptual elements to influence her photographic procedures, as well as to integrate philosophical concepts about the way light behaves. Ortega's paintings and drawings are influenced by modernist approaches. Currently, Ortega explores mixed media and compositional improvisation. Her latest body of work incorporates drones to capture photography and video footage that is then digitally and manually manipulated.

Her work has been exhibited internationally at venues including the Anahuacalli Museum as part of the Diego Rivera XIII Biennial, Higher Pictures Generation Gallery, and Museo del Vidrio. Ortega received the Edward F. Albee Foundation Artist Residency Fellowship in Montauk, NY.

Ortega received her BFA from Guanajuato University and received her MFA in Painting and Printmaking from Yale University School of Art. She splits her time between New York City and Honolulu, Hawaii.

== List of awards ==
- 2014 Edward F. Albee Foundation, Artist Residency Fellowship, Montauk, NY
- 2008 First Place, Purchase Award, Diego Rivera XIII National Biennial, Mexico
- 2006-07 Award: National System of Artistic Creators FONCA. (National Fund for Culture and Arts), Mexico
- 2004 Honorable Mention, Diego Rivera IX National Biennial, Mexico
