= María Clara doctrine =

The María Clara doctrine, or women's honor doctrine, was a presumption in Philippine judicial practice that gave significant weight to a woman's testimony in cases of sexual abuse, particularly rape.

Under this doctrine, even with weak evidence, courts may be inclined to consider the statements of self-proclaimed victims as grounds for conviction. It was typically summarized in judicial opinions as: "Women, especially Filipinos, would not admit that they have been abused unless that abuse had actually happened. This is due to their natural instinct to protect their honor."

Despite being highly controversial and widely criticized, the principle had been widely applied for decades until the Philippine Supreme Court overturned it in the 2018 People v. Amarela case and subsequent documents.

== Etymology ==
The doctrine was named after María Clara from José Rizal's novel Noli Me Tángere. Clara is characterized as reserved and shy and was later considered an "ideal role model" for women in Filipino culture, although such notion was imposed by Spanish colonizers. This contrasted the ideal of women being more assertive, independent and courageous which dates back to the precolonial era.

== Legal history ==
=== Introduction: People vs. Taño ===
The doctrine was first articulated in Philippine jurisprudence in the 1960 case of People v. Taño. The Court through Justice Alejo Labrador asserted a "well known fact" that women, especially Filipinos "would not admit that they have been abused unless that abuse had actually happened." The court reasoned that women's natural instinct is to protect their honor. The case involved three armed robbers who the court found liable for taking turns in raping a woman.

=== Turning point: People v. Amarela ===
Approximately 58 years after the doctrine was incorporated into jurisprudence, the Supreme Court, in People v. Amarela, reversed a January 17, 2018 ruling of a Davao court convicting two individuals of rape. The 2018 decision was released in late February. The case involved an alleged rape that happened in 2009 and the two accused were sentenced of reclusión perpetua, or forty years of imprisonment, in 2012. The decision was affirmed by the Court of Appeals in 2016.

The Supreme Court rejected this doctrine in its ruling, describing it as causing a travesty of justice by placing the accused at an unfair disadvantage, and criticizing it for assuming that no Filipina woman of "decent repute" would falsely claim that she was abused. The Court added: "We should stay away from such mind-set and accept the realities of a woman's dynamic role in society today; she who has over the years transformed into a strong and confidently intelligent and beautiful person, willing to fight for her rights. In this way, we can evaluate the testimony of a private complainant of rape without gender bias or cultural misconception." In this case, the justices found serious contradictions in the witness testimonies and deemed them untenable.

The ruling has been regarded in legal scholarship as a turning point marking the abandonment of the María Clara doctrine. Women's rights groups and political parties criticized the decision, arguing that it effectively invalidated the doctrine, could embolden rapists, and misrepresented women's social realities. The court at the time, however, clarified through spokesman Theodore Te that the doctrine had not been abandoned by the en banc.

=== Abandonment: 2018 and beyond ===
In 2018, after People v. Amarela, Perez v. People qualified the application of the Maria Clara doctrine. In this case, an adult male accused committed acts of sexual abuse against a 12-year-old girl. Although the Supreme Court upheld the conviction, it did so based on the victim's credible testimony, corroborating medical evidence, and the clear power imbalance between an adult male and a minor girl, rather than on the Maria Clara doctrine. The court warned that the role of patriarchy in some social relationships should not be overlooked.

In 2022, the Supreme Court of the Philippines issued the Benchbook on Gender-Sensitive Adjudication, which explicitly classified the Maria Clara doctrine as a "judicial myth", stating that the principle relies on gender stereotypes and may undermine the fair assessment of sexual violence cases.

In the Legal Feminism in Philippine Gender Jurisprudence report released in November 2023 considers the decision on People vs. Amarela as the point when the court abandoned the doctrine.

Future cases post-Amarela, such as Perez v. People, People v. ZZZ and People v. XXX relied on power imbalance rather than the Maria Clara doctrine.
