= Pauline Edwards =

British archer (born 1949)

Personal information
- Full name: Pauline Mary Edwards
- Born: April 23 1949

Sport
- Country: Great Britain
- Sport: Archery

Pauline Mary Edwards MBE (born 23 April 1949) is a British archer who represented Great Britain internationally at archery at the 1972 and 1988 Summer Olympic Games as well as several World Archery Championships.

== Career ==
She finished 25th in the women's individual event with a score of 2249 points.

Edwards competed at the 1985 World Archery Championships in Seoul and finished fourth.

At the 1988 Summer Olympic Games she finished seventeenth in the women's individual event and fifth in the women's team event.
