= Sam Tan (archer) =

Singaporean archer (1948–1992)

- Tan c. 1979

Personal information
- Full name: Samantha Tan Pek Hoon
- Nickname: Silver Lady
- Born: 1948 Colony of Singapore
- Died: 23 August 1992 (aged 44) Singapore
- Occupations: Archer; stenographer
- Years active: 1974–1980; 1983–1985
- Height: 1.58 (Note: As reported by The Straits Times in 1979.) m (5 ft 2 in)
- Weight: 40 kg (88 lb; 6 st 4 lb)
- Spouse: Mike Lim
Medal record
Women's archery
Representing Singapore
SEA Games
Gold medal – first place	1983 Singapore	Women's individual
Gold medal – first place	1983 Singapore	Women's 70 m
Silver medal – second place	1977 Malaysia	Women's individual
Silver medal – second place	1977 Malaysia	Women's 60 m
Silver medal – second place	1977 Malaysia	Women's 50 m
Silver medal – second place	1977 Malaysia	Women's 30 m
Silver medal – second place	1977 Malaysia	Women's team
Silver medal – second place	1979 Indonesia	Women's 60 m
Silver medal – second place	1983 Singapore	Women's 30 m
Bronze medal – third place	1979 Indonesia	Women's 50 m

Samantha Tan Pek Hoon (1948 – 23 August 1992) was a Singaporean archer. A former stenographer for the Housing and Development Board, she took up archery in late 1974. She went on to compete at the 1977 SEA Games, where she won five silver medals; she was dubbed the "Silver Lady" for her performance. Tan participated at the 1978 Asian Games and the 1979 SEA Games, but faced a one-year ban in 1979 from the Archery Association of Singapore (AAS) for her frequent unpunctuality. Following this, she announced her retirement from archery, but was later persuaded by AAS president Bill Wee to return to the sport in March 1983.

Tan then competed at the 1983 SEA Games, where she won two golds and a bronze, becoming the first Singaporean archer to win a gold at the SEA Games. She also participated at the 1983 World Archery Championships in Los Angeles, United States, and at the 1984 International Invitational Friendly Shoot in Guangxi, China. However, in 1985, she was given a two-year ban from the AAS for misconduct during the trip to China. She subsequently retired from the sport and died in 1992 from cancer. She has since been described as "the country's most-medalled SEA Games archer" by Sport Singapore.

== Life and career ==
Tan was born in 1948 in the Colony of Singapore. (Note: She was 44 in 1992, 32 in 1980, and 29 in 1977.) Little is known about her early life, except that she worked as a stenographer with the Housing and Development Board prior to taking up archery.

=== Archery career ===
In late 1974, Tan took up archery on the suggestion of Archery Association of Singapore (AAS) secretary Steven Tan (no relation), after being in a self-described "lost" and "lonely" part of her life. He brought her to the archery club at YMCA and had her practice archery; she soon developed an interest in the sport. In March 1975, she participated in her first competition at the Bangkok Indoor Shoot, where she won a bronze medal. In 1977, she was among those selected by the AAS to train at the National University of Singapore's archery range ahead of the 1977 SEA Games in Kuala Lumpur, Malaysia, along with partaking in a trial to identify the archers that would be selected. During this period of training, the AAS was invited to some friendly matches in Indonesia, which they accepted. Tan was a part of the delegation that went to Jakarta, Indonesia.

In October 1977, the AAS held the trials to determine their SEA Games delegation, and Tan was recommended to the Singapore National Olympic Council (SNOC), alongside four male archers and three female archers. At the 1977 SEA Games, she won five silvers in the women's individual, women's 60 m, women's 50 m, women's 30 m, and women's team archery events. She also broke Singapore's record in the women's individual event by scoring 1,167, beating Laura de Rozario's 1,082. Tan was popularly known as the "Silver Lady" for her performance, and was awarded the Meritorious Award by the SNOC.

Tan then qualified for the Singapore delegation to the 1978 Asian Games in Bangkok, Thailand. She was predicted by Godfrey Robert of The Straits Times to win a bronze, but did not attain any medals. New Nation's Brian Miller and Philip Tan attributed the archery team's lack of success to being "outclassed" among the other Asian archers. At the 1979 SEA Games in Jakarta, Indonesia, she was considered a possible gold medalist by Joe Dorai of The Straits Times; she won a silver and a bronze. Later, in October 1979, she was issued a one-year ban from competitive archery by the AAS due to her constant unpunctuality; (Note: In 1985, it was reported that the ban was also due to her criticising the AAS.) among other instances, she had missed the flight to Jakarta during the 1979 SEA Games and the closing ceremony bus at the 1978 Asian Games. As a result, she was unable to compete at the 1980 Asian Archery Championships or the 1980 Summer Olympics.

Tan stated of the ban to Her World that "I still have not decided whether to appeal – it is like admitting you are wrong – or to drop archery altogether." In January 1980, she announced her retirement from archery, mainly due to the ban. In March, it was reported that she was teaching archery. She said to New Nation that she "[missed] competitive archery terribly" but was unsure if she would return to the sport after the ban. She was eventually convinced to return to archery in March 1983 by AAS president Bill Wee. She subsequently competed at the 1983 SEA Games held in Singapore, where she managed to win two golds and one silver, becoming the first Singaporean to win a gold medal in archery at the SEA Games. (Note: Singapore's next gold medal in archery came at the 2013 SEA Games by Chan Jing Ru.) She stated of her gold win, "At last we can hear the 'Majulah Singapura' at the archery range."

In October 1983, Tan participated at the 1983 World Archery Championships in Los Angeles, United States, where she gained 2294 points, placing 69th. In April 1984, she was a part of the Singapore delegation sent to participate in the International Invitational Friendly Shoot in Guangxi, China. It also saw athletes from Russia, Poland, Italy, Mongolia, North Korea, and Thailand participating. She also received the Meritorious Award by the SNOC in 1984 for her performance at the 1983 SEA Games.

In January 1985, it was reported by the Singapore Monitor that Tan could face another ban from the AAS for alleged misconduct after arriving at the airport for the International Invitational Friendly Shoot. Wee said there was "an ugly scene on [her] arrival" and that he did not receive a reply when he asked about her behaviour. Speaking to the Singapore Monitor, Tan dismissed claims of misconduct or alcohol consumption. She said that the team manager had also behaved questionably and should be investigated too. In May, a nine-member committee of the AAS announced their decision to ban her for two years for misconduct. Wee said that the committee had originally planned for a three-year ban, but decided on two years instead. Tan said she would not appeal the ban and subsequently retired.

== Personal life and death ==
Tan was married to bowler Mike Lim. She died on 23 August 1992, aged 44, after 16 months of battling cancer, and had been working as a magazine manager at the time. She was cremated at Mount Vernon Columbarium. In response to her death, Wee stated, "We haven't found anyone to match Sam. She had the heart of the lion. She was the greatest lady archer Singapore has produced." Tan was described as "the country's most-medalled SEA Games archer" by Sport Singapore in 2025.
