= Marie Claire van Stevens =

Belgian archer (born 1948)

Personal information
- Nationality: Belgian
- Born: 22 May 1948 (age 78) Vilvoorde, Belgium

Sport
- Country: Belgium
- Sport: archery

Achievements and titles
- Olympic finals: 1984 Summer Olympic Games
- World finals: World Archery Championships (1987 and 1989)
- Regional finals: 2019 European Masters Games

Marie-Claire van Stevens (born 22 May 1948 in Vilvoorde) is a Belgian archer.

== Archery ==
Van Stevens competed in the 1984 Summer Olympic Games. She came 22nd with 2431 points in the women's individual event.

She took part in the World Archery Championships in 1987 and 1989 finishing 46th and 51st respectively.

In 2019 she won the recurve women 70+ category at the 2019 European Masters Games.
