= Ilenuța =

- Village
- Location within Moldova
- Coordinates: 47.6333333333°N 27.7122222222°E
- Country: Moldova
- District: Fălești District

Government
  - Mayor: Alexandr Moroi (PSRM)

Population (2014 census)
  - Total: 1,394
- Time zone: UTC+2 (EET)
  - Summer (DST): UTC+3 (EEST)

Ilenuța is a village in Fălești District, Moldova.
