= Rocky Selvarajoo =

Singaporean boxer (born 1952)

Personal information
- Nationality: Singaporean
- Born: Selvarajoo S/O Malayappan Krishnasamy; 15 December 1952 (age 73) Singapore
- Weight: Light Welterweight; Featherweight

Boxing career
- Stance: Orthodox
Medal record
Representing Singapore
Men's Boxing
Silver medal – second place	1976 Asean Championships	Featherweight

Selvarajoo S/O Malayappan Krishnasamy (born December 15, 1952, in Singapore), better known as Rocky Selvarajoo, is a former boxer from Singapore, who won the silver medal in the 1976 Asean Boxing Championships.

Rocky fought world champion and Montreal Olympic gold medalist Gu Yong-ju in 1977, but the fight had to be stopped after he received a cut to his eye. In the 1978 Bangkok King's Cup, he beat 1979 Sea Games gold medalist Johnny Elorde by technical knockout.

In 1982, he won the Golden Gloves Championship.

In 1985, Rocky took part in the 1985 Southeast Asian Games in the light middleweight category.

In 1991, at 38, he knocked out 1985 Sea Games silver medalist Thaweewat Islam, who was then 23, in the first round of a demonstration.

He retired as an undefeated national champion in six weight categories in 1991.
