= Lilies Handayani =

Indonesian archer (born 1965)

Personal information
- Nationality: Indonesia
- Born: April 15, 1965 (age 61) Surabaya, East Java, Indonesia
- Education: Universitas 17 Agustus 1945 Surabaya; State University of Surabaya
- Spouse: Denny Trisyanto (m. 1988)
- Website: www.lilieshandayani.com

Sport
- Sport: Archery
- Event(s): Recurve & Compound
- Coached by: Donald Pandiangan
Medal record
Representing Indonesia
Women's recurve archery
Olympic Games
Silver medal – second place	1988 Seoul	Women's team
SEA Games
Gold medal – first place	1989 Kuala Lumpur	Women's individual
Gold medal – first place	1989 Kuala Lumpur	Women's team
Women's compound archery
World Cup
Silver medal – second place	2007 Dover	Women's team
SEA Games
Silver medal – second place	2005 Philippines	Women's team
Silver medal – second place	2007 Nakhon Ratchasima	Women's team

Lilies Handayani (born 15 April 1965 in Surabaya) is an Indonesian former archer who was part of the team that won the first ever Olympic medal for Indonesia.

Together with Nurfitriyana Saiman and Kusuma Wardhani she won the silver medal in the team competition at the 1988 Summer Olympics in Seoul. Her career continued to soar until 2008 when she stopped and focused on becoming a coach and managed the archery school she had pioneered before.

== Lilies Handayani's Archery School ==
Lilies Handayani together with her husband Denny Trisyanto set up an archery school named Lilies Handayani Srikandi Archery School (LHSAS). It is located in Surabaya.

== In popular culture ==
- Portrayed by Chelsea Islan in the 2016 Indonesian film 3 Srikandi.
