= Benita Edds =

American archer

Benita Jean Edds (born 12 June 1958 in Sullivan) is an American former archer.

== Life ==
Edds graduated from Indiana State University in 1981 gaining a major in life science and medical technology. She later became a chemist for Eli Lilly and dog breeder. She was inducted into the Indiana State University Athletics Hall of Fame in 1998.

== Archery ==
Edds competed in the 1984 Summer Olympic Games. She came 34th with 2366 points scored in the women's individual event.
