= Marie-Claire Schanne-Klein =

French physicist and academic

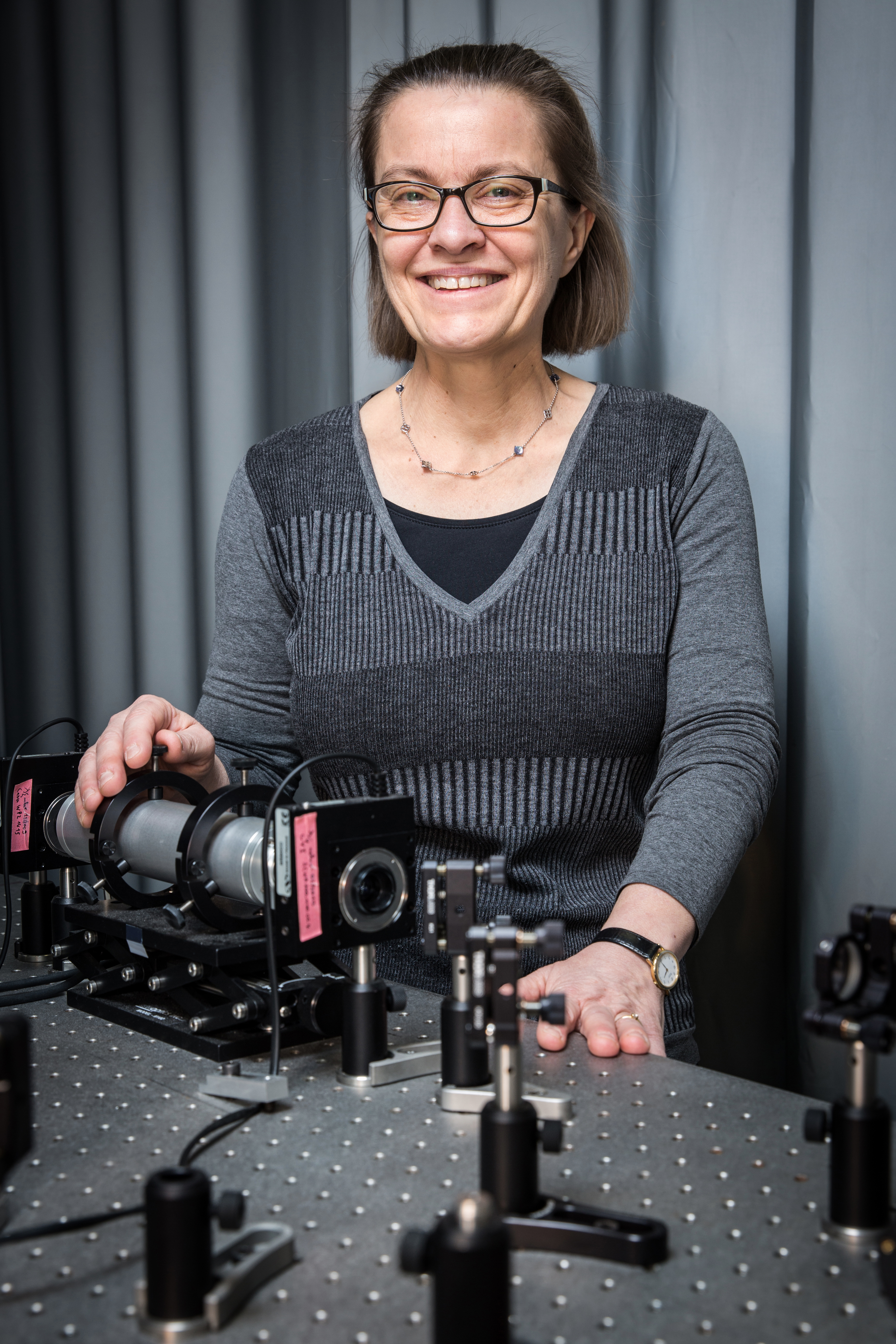
- Education: École polytechnique
- Scientific career
- Workplaces: École polytechnique
- Thesis: Non-linearites optiques des verres dopes par cristallites de semi-conducteur en regime de confinement fort : mecanismes et dynamique (1992)

Marie-Claire Schanne-Klein is a French physicist who is a professor at the French National Centre for Scientific Research. She is based in the Laboratory for Optics and Biosciences, where she studies the nonlinear optics of chiral molecules.

== Early life and education ==
Schanne-Klein studied physics at the École polytechnique. She moved to the Paris-Sud University for graduate studies focused on lasers, before returning to École polytechnique for doctoral research, where she worked on non-linear optics.

== Research and career ==
Schanne-Klein combines theoretical and experimental approaches to better understand molecular materials. Specifically, she studies nonlinear optics of chiral molecules and second-harmonic generation imaging of collagen fibres. Using Hyper–Rayleigh scattering, Schanne-Klein showed that the hyperpolarizability of collagen fibres, which forms the basis of the contrast observed in non-linear optical measurements, occurred due to the coherent amplification of peptide bonds along the lengths of the molecules.

Schanne-Klein has applied her understanding of spectroscopy to understand aged parchments. These parchments often contain collagen, and Schanne-Klein showed that non-linear optical microscopy could be used to evaluate degradation within the material.

Schanne-Klein is a professor at the French National Centre for Scientific Research and the École polytechnique.

In 2019 Schanne Klein was awarded the CNRS Silver Medal.

== Selected publications ==
- Ekimov, A. I.; Kudryavtsev, I. A.; Efros, Al. L.; Yazeva, T. V.; Hache, F.; Schanne-Klein, M. C.; Rodina, A. V.; Ricard, D.; Flytzanis, C. (1993-01-01). "Absorption and intensity-dependent photoluminescence measurements on CdSe quantum dots: assignment of the first electronic transitions". Journal of the Optical Society of America B. 10 (1): 100. Bibcode:1993JOSAB..10..100E. doi:10.1364/josab.10.000100. ISSN 0740-3224.
- Klein MC; Hache F; Ricard D; Flytzanis C (1 December 1990). "Size dependence of electron-phonon coupling in semiconductor nanospheres: The case of CdSe". Physical Review B. 42 (17): 11123–11132. doi:10.1103/physrevb.42.11123. ISSN 0163-1829. PMID 9995394. Wikidata Q47438190.
- Delphine Débarre; Willy Supatto; Ana-Maria Pena; Aurélie Fabre; Thierry Tordjmann; Laurent Combettes; Marie-Claire Schanne-Klein; Emmanuel Beaurepaire (1 January 2006). "Imaging lipid bodies in cells and tissues using third-harmonic generation microscopy". Nature Methods. 3 (1): 47–53. doi:10.1038/nmeth813. ISSN 1548-7091. PMID 16369553. Wikidata Q52663586.
