= Amornrat Kaewbaidhoon =

Thai archer (born 1944)

Sport
- Country: Thailand
- Sport: Archery

Amornrat Kaewbaidhoon (born 23 June 1944) is a Thai archer.

== Career ==
She competed at the 1976 Summer Olympic Games in the women's individual event and finished eighteenth with a score of 2282 points.

Kaewbaidhoon won eight medals at the Southeast Asian Games from 1977 to 1981.
