= Archery at the 1983 SEA Games =

Archery at the 1983 SEA Games was held at Nanyang Technological Institute Field from June 1 to June 4, 1983.

== Medalists ==
=== Recurve ===
Event	Gold	Silver	Bronze
Men's individual	(Indonesia) Donald Pandiangan (2496)	(Indonesia) Suradi Rikimin (2465)	(Indonesia) Tatang Ferry Budiman (2421)
Men's 90M	(Indonesia) Donald Pandiangan (561)	(Indonesia) Suradi Rikimin (536)	(Indonesia) Tatang Ferry Budiman (529)
Men's 70M	(Indonesia) Suradi Rikimin (621)	(Indonesia) Donald Pandiangan (618)	(Indonesia) Tatang Ferry Budiman (607)
Men's 50M	(Indonesia) Donald Pandiangan (640)	(Indonesia) Suradi Rikimin (628)	(Indonesia) Tatang Ferry Budiman (622)
Men's 30M	(Indonesia) Suradi Rikimin (680)	(Indonesia) Donald Pandiangan (677)	(Thailand) Vallop Pottaya (666)
Men's team	Indonesia (7382); Donald Pandiangan (2496); Suradi Rukimin (2465); Tatang Ferry Budiman (2421)	Thailand (7031); Banchong Dosanee (2351); Vallop Potaya (2349); Sangad Kaewbaidhoon (2331)	Malaysia (6685); John Lee Poh Sen (2266); Abdul Hamid bin Hassan (2241); Micky Lee (2178)
Women's individual	(Singapore) Samantha Tan Pek Hoon (2319)	(Indonesia) Nurfitriyana Saiman (2315)	(Indonesia) Zefilia Saiman (2310)
Women's 70M	(Singapore) Samantha Tan Pek Hoon (565)	(Indonesia) Zefilia Saiman (548)	(Indonesia) Nurfitriyana Saiman (532)
Women's 60M	(Philippines) Cherrie Valera (581)	(Indonesia) Nurfitriyana Saiman (580)	(Singapore) Samantha Tan Pek Hoon (576) (Thailand) Jariya Jingjit (576)
Women's 50M	(Indonesia) Zefilia Saiman (577)	(Indonesia) Nurfitriyana Saiman (575)	(Indonesia) Jenny Darochmai (555)
Women's 30M	(Philippines) Cherrie Valera (648)	(Singapore) Samantha Tan Pek Hoon (639)	(Indonesia) Jenny Darochmai (638)
Women's team	Indonesia (6869); Nurfitriyana Saiman (2315); Zefilia Saiman (2310); Jenny Darochmai (2244)	Thailand (6686); Jariya Jingjit (2273); Usanee Tokahuta (2209); Grit Suksompong (2204)	Philippines (6643); Cherrie Valera (2269); Carla Cabrera (2222); Ludivina Jamlang (2152)

== Medal table ==
* Host nation (Singapore)

Rank	Nation	Gold	Silver	Bronze	Total
1	Indonesia	8	9	8	25
2	Singapore*	2	1	1	4
3	Philippines	2	0	1	3
4	Thailand	0	2	2	4
5	Malaysia	0	0	1	1
Totals (5 entries)		12	12	13	37
