= Iliana Biridakis =

Jordanian archer (born 1959)

Personal information
- Native name: إيلينا بريداكس
- National team: Jordan
- Born: September 29, 1959 (age 65)
- Height: 166 cm (5 ft 5 in) (1988)
- Weight: 66 kg (1988)

Sport
- Country: Jordan
- Sport: Archery
- Updated on 14 July 2017

Iliana Biridakis (Arabic: إيلينا بريداكس; born September 29, 1959) is a retired Jordanian Olympic archer. She represented Jordan at 1988 Summer Olympics in Seoul.

== Olympic participation ==
=== Seoul 1988 ===
Archery – Women's Individual

She ranked 61st out of 62 competitor in the final standing.

Final Standing
Rank	Name	Nation	Open round	Rank	Eighth final	Rank	Quarter final	Rank	Semi final	Rank	Grand final
61	Iliana Biridakis	Jordan	1055	61	DNQ		DNQ		DNQ		DNQ
