= Maria Clara Marra =

Brazilian lawyer, accountant, and politician

- Maria in 2026

State deputy of Minas Gerais
- Incumbent
- Assumed office 1 February 2023

Personal details
- Born: Maria Clara Matos Marra; 14 January 1999 (age 27) Patrocínio, Minas Gerais, Brazil
- Party: Brazilian Social Democracy Party (PSDB)
- Other political affiliations: Christian Democracy
- Parent: Deiró Moreira Marra (father)
- Education: Pontifical Catholic University of Minas Gerais; Federal University of Minas Gerais
- Occupation: Accountant, lawyer, politician

Maria Clara Matos Marra (born January 14, 1999) is a Brazilian accountant, lawyer, and politician affiliated with the Brazilian Social Democracy Party (PSDB). Since 2022, she has served as a state deputy for Minas Gerais.

== Biography ==
=== Early years and education ===
The daughter of politician Deiró Moreira Marra, Maria was born in Patrocínio, a city in the interior of Minas Gerais, in 1999. He earned a degree in accounting from the Pontifical Catholic University of Minas Gerais (PUC-MG) and a law degree from the Federal University of Minas Gerais (UFMG).

=== Politics ===
A member of the Christian Democracy (DC) party, she ran for state representative in Minas Gerais in the 2022 election. After receiving more than forty thousand votes, she was elected. She was the only representative from her party to win a seat in the Legislative Assembly of Minas Gerais (ALMG). The following year, she joined the Brazilian Social Democracy Party (PSDB). A member of the PSDB, she was reelected to the position after receiving more than 90,000 votes.

==== Electoral perforamnce ====
Year	Position	Party	Votes	Result	Ref.
2022	State deputy from Minas Gerais	DC	42 415	Elected	
2026	State deputy from Minas Gerais	PSDB	91 463	Elected	
