= Nurfitriyana Saiman =

Indonesian archer (born 1962)

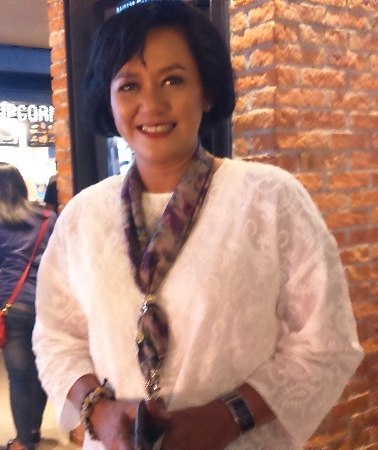
- Saiman in 2016

Personal information
- Full name: Nurfitriyana Saiman-Lantang
- Born: 7 March 1962 (age 64) Jakarta, Indonesia
- Education: Perbanas Institute
- Height: 159 cm (5 ft 3 in)
- Weight: 51 kg (112 lb)

Sport
- Sport: Archery
- Event: Recurve
- Coached by: Donald Pandiangan
Medal record
Women's archery
Representing Indonesia
Olympic Games
Silver medal – second place	1988 Seoul	Women's team
World Championships
Bronze medal – third place	1995 Jakarta	Women's team
SEA Games
Gold medal – first place	1981 Manila	Women's 60m
Gold medal – first place	1983 Singapore	Women's team
Gold medal – first place	1987 Jakarta	Double Fita 30m
Gold medal – first place	1987 Jakarta	Women's 60m
Gold medal – first place	1987 Jakarta	Women's team
Gold medal – first place	1987 Jakarta	Double Fita team
Gold medal – first place	1989 Kuala Lumpur	Women's team
Gold medal – first place	1993 Singapore	Women's team
Gold medal – first place	1995 Chiang Mai	Women's team
Silver medal – second place	1981 Manila	Women's 70m
Silver medal – second place	1981 Manila	Women's team
Silver medal – second place	1983 Singapore	Individual
Silver medal – second place	1983 Singapore	Women's 50m
Silver medal – second place	1983 Singapore	Women's 60m
Silver medal – second place	1987 Jakarta	Double Fita 50m
Silver medal – second place	1987 Jakarta	Women's 70m
Silver medal – second place	1987 Jakarta	Grand total
Silver medal – second place	1989 Kuala Lumpur	Individual
Bronze medal – third place	1981 Manila	Women's 30m
Bronze medal – third place	1983 Singapore	Women's 70m

Nurfitriyana Saiman-Lantang (born 7 March 1962) is a retired Indonesian archer who became a coach after retiring as a player. Together with Lilies Handayani and Kusuma Wardhani she won a team silver medal at the 1988 Olympics, bringing the first ever Olympic medal to Indonesia. She also competed in the individual and team events at the 1992 and 1996 Olympics; her best individual result was a ninth place finish in 1988. In the 1980s, Saiman won multiple medals in individual recurve events at the SEA Games. After retiring from competitions she worked as a coach and prepared the national archery team for the 2016 Olympics.

== In popular culture ==
- Portrayed by Bunga Citra Lestari in the 2016 Indonesian film 3 Srikandi.
