= Vreny Burger =

Swiss archer (born 1955)

Vreny Burger (born 25 February 1955) is a former Swiss archer. She competed at the 1984 Summer Olympics and in the 1988 Summer Olympics.
