= Donald Pandiangan =

Indonesian archer (1945–2008)

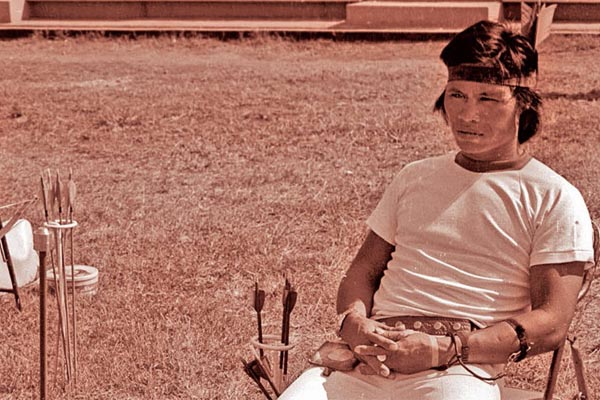

Personal information
- Full name: Donald Djatunas Pandiangan
- Nickname: Robin Hood Indonesia
- Nationality: Indonesian
- Born: 12 December 1945 Sidikalang, North Sumatra, Indonesia
- Died: 20 August 2008 (aged 62) Jakarta, Indonesia

Sport
- Sport: Archery
Medal record
Men's recurve archery
Representing Indonesia
Asian Games
Silver medal – second place	1982 New Delhi	Men's team
Bronze medal – third place	1978 Bangkok	Men's team
Asian Championships
Gold medal – first place	1980 Kolkata	Individual
SEA Games
Gold medal – first place	1977 Kuala Lumpur	Individual
Gold medal – first place	1977 Kuala Lumpur	Men's 30m
Gold medal – first place	1977 Kuala Lumpur	Men's 50m
Gold medal – first place	1977 Kuala Lumpur	Men's team
Gold medal – first place	1979 Jakarta	Individual
Gold medal – first place	1979 Jakarta	Men's 30m
Gold medal – first place	1979 Jakarta	Men's 50m
Gold medal – first place	1979 Jakarta	Men's 70m
Gold medal – first place	1979 Jakarta	Men's 90m
Gold medal – first place	1979 Jakarta	Men's team
Gold medal – first place	1981 Manila	Individual
Gold medal – first place	1981 Manila	Men's 30m
Gold medal – first place	1981 Manila	Men's 50m
Gold medal – first place	1981 Manila	Men's 70m
Gold medal – first place	1981 Manila	Men's 90m
Gold medal – first place	1981 Manila	Men's team
Gold medal – first place	1983 Singapore	Individual
Gold medal – first place	1983 Singapore	Men's 50m
Gold medal – first place	1983 Singapore	Men's 90m
Gold medal – first place	1983 Singapore	Men's team
Gold medal – first place	1987 Jakarta	Double Fita 30m
Gold medal – first place	1987 Jakarta	Men's team
Silver medal – second place	1977 Kuala Lumpur	Men's 70m
Silver medal – second place	1983 Singapore	Men's 30m
Silver medal – second place	1983 Singapore	Men's 70m
Silver medal – second place	1987 Jakarta	Men's 70m
Silver medal – second place	1987 Jakarta	Men's 90m
Silver medal – second place	1987 Jakarta	Grand total

Donald Pandiangan (12 December 1945 – 20 August 2008) was an Indonesian archer who served as a coach after retiring as a player. He competed at the 1976 and 1984 Summer Olympics. Pandiangan coached the Indonesian archery team that won the country's first Olympic medal, a silver, in 1988. He died in 2008, aged 62.

Pandiangan discovered archery relatively late in life at age 25, receiving a beginner's set as a gift while working at a transport company after financial constraints derailed his dream of becoming an engineer. He quickly excelled, winning his first national gold medal at the 1973 National Sports Week in Surabaya and setting a world record in the 70m recurve event at the 1977 edition in Jakarta. Over the next decade, he amassed more than 20 gold medals at the SEA Games from 1977 to 1987, solidifying his status as a dominant figure in regional archery. Additionally, he contributed to team successes at the Asian Games, earning a bronze medal in the men's team event in 1978 in Bangkok and a silver in 1982 in New Delhi.

Transitioning to coaching in the late 1980s, Pandiangan was appointed head coach of the Indonesian women's team earlier that year and led Lilies Handayani, Nurfitriyana Saiman, and Kusuma Wardhani to the historic silver in the team event at Seoul, defeating the United States in a shoot-off after overcoming the Soviet Union. The team, formed just months prior and training rigorously for six hours daily, outperformed expectations against taller competitors, with Pandiangan emphasizing composure and peak performance during the finals.

On 12 December 2022, on what would have been his 77th birthday, he was honored with a Google Doodle.
