= List of Filipino sportspeople =

This is a list of notable Filipino athletes.

== Alpine Skiers ==
- Juan Cipriano
- Asa Miller
- Ben Nanasca
- Michael Teruel

== American Football ==
- Tyson Alualu
- Eugene Amano
- Doug Baldwin
- Camryn Bynum
- Jason Carthen
- Marcus Davenport
- Gaby Dela Merced
- Jordon Dizon
- Roman Gabriel
- Chris Gocong
- Andrei Iosivas
- Josh Jacobs
- Fred Jones
- Jason Myers
- Nikko Remigio
- Tim Tebow

== Archery ==
- Marvin Agustin
- Ramón Aldea
- Agustina Bantiloc
- Rachel Cabral
- Jennifer Dy Chan
- Jasmin Figueroa
- Bianca Gotuaco
- Mark Javier
- Rowel Merto
- Luis Gabriel Moreno
- Francisco Naranjilla
- Carlos Santos
- Basilisa Ygnalaga

== Auto Racing ==
- Angelo Barretto
- Michele Bumgarner
- Bianca Bustamante
- Eduardo Coseteng
- Zachary David
- Gaby Dela Merced
- Daryl DeLeon
- Arsenio Laurel
- Paolo Lofamia
- Bienvenido Manalo
- Jovy Marcelo
- Enzo Pastor
- Pocholo Ramirez
- Dante Silverio
- Marlon Stöckinger
- Francisco C. Ventura
- Jomari Yllana

== Badminton ==
- Malvinne Alcala
- Kennevic Asuncion
- Christian Bernardo
- Paula Lynn Cao Hok
- Conrado Co
- Philip Joper Escueta
- Alyssa Leonardo
- Amparo Lim
- Alvin Morada
- Karyn Velez

== Baseball ==
- Benny Agbayani
- Chris Aguila
- Bobby Balcena
- Jason Bartlett
- Bobby Chouinard
- Filomeno Codiñera
- Hori Horibata
- Tim Lincecum
- Claudio Manela
- Ryuya Ogawa
- Alfredo Olivares
- Clay Rapada
- Addison Russell
- Regino Ylanan

== Basketball ==
- Dylan Ababou
- Rhenz Abando
- Johnny Abarrientos
- RJ Abarrientos
- Calvin Abueva
- Emilio Achacoso
- Rommel Adducul
- Bogs Adornado
- Japeth Aguilar
- Ato Agustin
- Maverick Ahanmisi
- Jimmy Alapag
- Kevin Alas
- Teddy Alfarero
- Alfie Almario
- Raymond Almazan
- Gelo Alolino
- Chad Alonzo
- Eric Altamirano
- Rich Alvarez
- Baser Amer
- Jack Animam
- Marlou Aquino
- Manuel Araneta Jr.
- Ryan Araña
- Ewon Arayi
- Francis Arnaiz
- Kurt Bachmann
- Carlos Badion
- Cyrus Baguio
- Jason Ballesteros
- Gab Banal
- Mac Baracael
- Rafael Barretto
- Mark Barroca
- Boyet Bautista
- Florentino Bautista
- Orlando Bauzon
- SJ Belangel
- Beau Belga
- Mac Belo
- Stefanie Berberabe
- Afril Bernardino
- Narciso Bernardo
- Aaron Black
- Andray Blatche
- Robert Bolick
- Charles Borck
- Vicki Brick
- Justin Brownlee
- Mary Ellyn Caasi
- Mark Caguioa
- Allan Caidic
- Francisco Calilan
- Ricky Calimag
- Hector Calma
- Ramon Campos Jr.
- KG Canaleta
- Mark Canlas
- Chris Cantonjos
- Ely Capacio
- Glenn Capacio
- Loreto Carbonell
- Johnedel Cardel
- Jeffrey Cariaso
- Bernardo Carpio
- JVee Casio
- Noy Castillo
- Jayson Castro
- Andrian Celada
- Ana Thea Cenarosa
- Philip Cezar
- Jeff Chan
- Jacinto Ciria Cruz
- Camille Clarin
- Jordan Clarkson
- Ricardo Cleofas
- Atoy Co
- Jerry Codiñera
- Carl Bryan Cruz
- Celino Cruz
- Geronimo Cruz
- Jericho Cruz
- Jervy Cruz
- Rey Cuenco
- Ed Daquioag
- Diego Dario
- Gary David
- Vanessa de Jesus
- Ranidel de Ocampo
- Yancy de Ocampo
- Eduardo Decena
- Karl Dehesa
- Andres dela Cruz
- Onchie dela Cruz
- Tony dela Cruz
- Paul Desiderio
- Yves Dignadice
- Jared Dillinger
- Aris Dimaunahan
- Marcus Douthit
- Kenneth Duremdes
- A. J. Edu
- Chris Ellis
- Chip Engelland
- Joseph Eriobu
- Poy Erram
- Russel Escoto
- Dennis Espino
- Rey Evangelista
- Ella Fajardo
- Felicisimo Fajardo
- Gabriel Fajardo
- June Mar Fajardo
- E.J. Feihl
- Boyet Fernandez
- Ramon Fernandez
- Kevin Ferrer
- Danny Florencio
- Larry Fonacier
- Patrick Fran
- Joanna Franquelli
- Edgardo Fulgencio
- Brandon Ganuelas-Rosser
- Matt Ganuelas-Rosser
- RR Garcia
- Tony Genato
- Isaac Go
- José Gochangco
- Frank Golla
- Javi Gómez de Liaño
- Juan Gómez de Liaño
- Norman Gonzales
- Wesley Gonzales
- Dante Gonzalgo
- Alfonzo Gotladera
- Will Gozum
- Rey Guevarra
- Abet Guidaben
- Rudy Hatfield
- Marvin Hayes
- Jordan Heading
- Rafael Hechanova
- Jayjay Helterbrand
- Cliff Hodge
- Dondon Hontiveros
- Danny Ildefonso
- JC Intal
- Jio Jalalon
- Pido Jarencio
- Chris Javier
- Robert Jaworski
- Manuel Jocson
- Raymar Jose
- Glenn Khobuntin
- Ange Kouame
- Garvo Lanete
- Marcio Lassiter
- Jerom Lastimosa
- Jojo Lastimosa
- Paul Lee
- Allana Lim
- Eduardo Lim
- Samboy Lim
- Jun Limpot
- Noli Locsin
- Francis Lopez
- Moro Lorenzo
- Carlos Loyzaga
- Chito Loyzaga
- Chris Lutz
- Ronnie Magsanoc
- Allein Maliksi
- Jamie Malonzo
- Gian Mamuyac
- Jeff Manday
- Vic Manuel
- Ramón Manulat
- Sam Marata
- Dave Marcelo
- Jimmy Mariano
- Alfonso Marquez
- Franco Marquicias
- Leonardo Marquicias
- Antonio Martínez
- James Martinez
- Primitivo Martínez
- Yoyong Martirez
- Jesús Marzán
- Rogelio Melencio
- Jolo Mendoza
- Paolo Mendoza
- Vergel Meneses
- Eric Menk
- Ogie Menor
- Sol Mercado
- Willie Miller
- Emman Monfort
- Kib Montalbo
- Mucha Mori
- Lauro Mumar
- Roehl Nadurata
- Rey Nambatac
- Evan Nelle
- Chris Newsome
- Janine Nicandro
- Gabe Norwood
- Amador Obordo
- Ed Ocampo
- Miguel Oczon
- Calvin Oftana
- Haydee Ong
- Sidney Onwubere
- Emmerson Oreta
- Constancio Ortiz
- Bibiano Ouano
- Victor Pablo
- Eduardo Pacheco
- Ambrosio Padilla
- Raiza Palmera-Dy
- Lexi Pana
- Manny Paner
- Naomi Panganiban
- Jun Papa
- Benjie Paras
- Kobe Paras
- Bobby Ray Parks Jr.
- Jake Pascual
- Kyle Pascual
- Ronald Pascual
- Alvin Patrimonio
- Mick Pennisi
- CJ Perez
- Jason Perkins
- Von Pessumal
- Marc Pingris
- Roger Pogoy
- Janine Pontejos
- Kris Porter
- Stanley Pringle
- Dindo Pumaren
- Franz Pumaren
- Kevin Quiambao
- Francisco Rabat
- Olsen Racela
- Cristobal Ramas
- Aldrech Ramos
- Dwight Ramos
- Ignacio Ramos
- Bong Ravena
- Kiefer Ravena
- Thirdy Ravena
- Kerby Raymundo
- Zaldy Realubit
- Rafi Reavis
- David Regullano
- Elmer Reyes
- Jay-R Reyes
- Renato Reyes
- Alberto Reynoso
- Renren Ritualo
- Ricci Rivero
- Eric Rodriguez
- Larry Rodriguez
- Joaquín Rojas
- Terrence Romeo
- Edgardo Roque
- Troy Rosario
- Chris Ross
- Allan Salangsang
- Ponciano Saldaña
- Nico Salva
- Marte Samson
- Ian Sangalang
- Leonard Santillan
- Arwind Santos
- Rodney Santos
- Meliton Santos
- Andy Seigle
- Greg Slaughter
- Al Solis
- Ervin Sotto
- Kai Sotto
- Christian Standhardinger
- Roi Sumang
- Jay-R Taganas
- Carl Tamayo
- Antonio Tantay
- Jack Tanuan
- Asi Taulava
- Moala Tautuaa
- Jeron Teng
- LA Tenorio
- Scottie Thompson
- Sonny Thoss
- Chris Tiu
- Arvin Tolentino
- Elias Tolentino
- Mariano Tolentino
- Mike Tolomia
- Norbert Torres
- Jong Uichico
- Martin Urra
- Arnold Van Opstal
- Al Vergara
- Francisco Vestil
- Boybits Victoria
- Antonio Villamor
- Enrico Villanueva
- Almond Vosotros
- Jay Washington
- Freddie Webb
- Kelly Williams
- Matthew Wright
- Fortunato Yambao
- James Yap
- Roberto Yburan
- Tonichi Yturri

== Bowling ==
- Arianne Cerdeña
- Angelo Constantino
- Bong Coo
- Lita dela Rosa
- Liza del Rosario
- Paeng Nepomuceno
- Oliver Ongtawco
- Zach Ramin
- Biboy Rivera
- Tito Sotto
- Krizziah Tabora
- Markwin Tee

== Bowls (lawn/indoor) ==
- Elmer Abatayo
- Rosita Bradborn
- Sonia Bruce
- Leo Carreon
- Christopher Dagpin
- Ronalyn Greenlees
- Hazel Jagonoy
- Ainie Knight
- Rodel Labayo
- Ronald Lising
- Angelo Morales
- Emmanuel Portacio
- Milagros Witheridge

== Boxing ==
- Gretchen Abaniel
- Alberto Adela
- Ricardo Adolfo
- Manfredo Alipala
- Alice Aparri
- Nicolas Aquilino
- Rodolfo Arpon
- Vicente Arsenal
- Al Asuncion
- Hergie Bacyadan
- Charlie Baleña
- Eduardo Baltar
- A. J. Banal
- Mark Anthony Barriga
- Genebert Basadre
- Ian Clark Bautista
- Reynaldo Bautista
- Federico Bonus
- Romeo Brin
- Dominador Calumarde
- Christopher Camat
- Leopoldo Cantancio
- John Riel Casimero
- Godfrey Castro
- Arlo Chavez
- Ronald Chavez
- Denver Cuello
- Simplicio de Castro
- Oscar de Larrazábal
- Manuel de los Santos
- Rodolfo Diaz
- Orlando Dollente
- Nonito Donaire
- Gabriel Elorde
- Benjamin Enríquez
- Celedonio Espinosa
- Luisito Espinosa
- Mario Fernandez
- Rene Fortaleza
- Rey Fortaleza
- Ricardo Fortaleza
- Felipe Gabuco
- Josie Gabuco
- Reynaldo Galido
- Ceferino Garcia
- Mercito Gesta
- Z Gorres
- John Gray
- Michael Hormillosa
- Roberto Jalnaiz
- Nelson Jamili
- Sonny Boy Jaro
- Rogen Ladon
- Emmanuel Legaspi
- Arlan Lerio
- Danilo Lerio
- Segundo Macalalad
- Irish Magno
- Eumir Marcial
- Ruben Mares
- John Marvin
- Paulino Meléndres
- Mark Melligen
- Jujeath Nagaowa
- Rolando Navarrete
- Donnie Nietes
- Felipe Nunag
- Felix Ocampo
- Alejandro Ortuoste
- Carlo Paalam
- Bobby Pacquiao
- Manny Pacquiao
- Carlos Padilla Sr.
- José Padilla Jr.
- Violito Payla
- Teogenes Pelegrino
- Dodie Boy Peñalosa
- Gerry Peñalosa
- Nesthy Petecio
- Ernesto Porto
- Elias Recaido
- Erbito Salavarria
- Rudy Salud
- Vic Saludar
- Larry Semillano
- Leopoldo Serantes
- Marvin Sonsona
- Charly Suarez
- Efren Tabanas
- Harry Tañamor
- Joan Tipon
- Arnulfo Torrevillas
- Leon Trani
- Vicente Tuñacao
- Onyok Velasco
- Roel Velasco
- Mariano Vélez
- Isidro Vicera
- Manolo Vicera
- Virgilio Vicera
- Pancho Villa
- Anthony Villanueva
- José Villanueva
- Aira Villegas
- Brian Viloria
- Bonifacio Zarcal

== Chess ==
- Rogelio Antonio Jr.
- Rosendo Balinas Jr.
- Oliver Barbosa
- Rogelio Barcenilla
- Paulo Bersamina
- Richard Bitoon
- Arianne Caoili
- Janelle Mae Frayna
- Jan Jodilyn Fronda
- John Paul Gomez
- Jayson Gonzales
- Darwin Laylo
- Nelson Mariano
- Alekhine Nouri
- Mark Paragua
- Megan Paragua
- Daniel Quizon
- Julio Sadorra
- Joseph Sánchez
- Enrico Sevillano
- Wesley So
- Eugene Torre
- Buenaventura Villamayor

== Cricket ==
- Machanda Biddappa
- Richard Goodwin
- Jonathan Hill
- Haider Kiani
- Vimal Kumar
- Jason Long
- Ruchir Mahajan
- Karweng NG
- Grant Russ
- Kuldeep Singh
- Daniel Smith
- Henry Tyler

== Curling ==
- Kathleen Dubberstein
- Alan Frei
- Christian Haller
- Enrico Pfister
- Marc Pfister

== Cycling ==
- Norberto Arceo
- Deogracias Asuncion
- Christopher Caluag
- Daniel Caluag
- Jonel Carcueva
- Benjamin Evangelista
- Mark Galedo
- Rodolfo Guaves
- Rolando Guaves
- Maximo Junta
- Norberto Oconer
- Daniel Olivares
- Cornelio Padilla
- Edgardo Pagarigan
- Diomedes Panton
- Bernardo Rimarim
- Arturo Romeo
- Roberto Roxas
- Marella Salamat
- Domingo Villanueva

== Darts ==
- Lourence Ilagan
- Noel Malicdem
- Paolo Nebrida
- Christian Perez
- Gilbert Ulang

== Diving ==
- Zardo Domenios
- Rexel Fabriga
- Sheila Mae Pérez

== Equestrian ==
- Joker Arroyo
- Maria Angelica Ayala
- Denise Cojuangco
- Mikee Cojuangco-Jaworski
- Ellesse Gundersen
- Toni Leviste

== Figure Skating ==
- Jules Alpe
- Melissa Bulanhagui
- Christopher Caluza
- Edrian Paul Celestino
- Zhaira Costiniano
- Amanda Evora
- Misha Fabian
- Sofia Frank
- Isabella Gamez
- Aleksandr Korovin
- Kathryn Magno
- Dikki John Martinez
- Michael Christian Martinez
- Michael Novales
- Ashley Ortega
- Alisson Perticheto
- Mericien Venzon

== Football/Soccer/Futsal ==
- Amani Aguinaldo
- David Alaba
- Paulino Alcántara
- Rodolfo Alicante
- Marwin Angeles
- Tahnai Annis
- Ian Araneta
- Jorrel Aristorenas
- Misagh Bahadoran
- Isabella Bandoja
- David Basa
- Buda Bautista
- Angela Beard
- Enrique Beech
- Sarina Bolden
- Reina Bonta
- Aly Borromeo
- Henry Brauner
- Ryley Bugay
- Nate Burkey
- Dennis Cagara
- Shelah Cadag
- Chieffy Caligdong
- Aris Caslib
- Anicka Castañeda
- Sara Castañeda
- Malea Cesar
- Jeffrey Christiaens
- Heather Cooke
- Jessika Cowart
- Kenshiro Daniels
- Jonathan de Guzmán
- Jason de Jong
- Carli de Murga
- Alisha del Campo
- Anton del Rosario
- Armand del Rosario
- Rudy del Rosario
- Maria dela Cruz
- Patrick Deyto
- Curt Dizon
- Ruben Doctora
- Jimmy Doña
- Roxy Dorlas
- Sara Eggesvik
- Neil Etheridge
- Dave Fegidero
- Norman Fegidero
- Isabella Flanigan
- Kiara Fontanilla
- Carleigh Frilles
- Roel Gener
- Rob Gier
- Ali Go
- Freddy Gonzalez
- Chad Gould
- Cathrine Graversen
- Chris Greatwich
- Phil Greatwich
- Simon Greatwich
- Katrina Guillou
- Ángel Guirado
- Juan Luis Guirado
- Leigh Gunn
- Mark Hartmann
- Matthew Hartmann
- Kaya Hawkinson
- Joana Houplin
- Patrice Impelido
- Ray Jónsson
- Chantelle Maniti
- Virgilio Lobregat
- Hali Long
- Jerry Lucena
- Eva Madarang
- Chandler McDaniel
- Griffin McDaniel
- Olivia McDaniel
- Miriam Merlin
- Jessica Miclat
- Lexton Moy
- Paul Mulders
- Roland Müller
- Ernest Nierras
- Samantha Nierras
- Nick O'Donnell
- Natalie Oca
- Demitrius Omphroy
- Satoshi Ōtomo
- Manny Ott
- Inna Palacios
- Marisa Park
- Isabella Pasion
- Javier Patiño
- Gino Pavone
- Marlon Piñero
- OJ Porteria
- Quinley Quezada
- Dominique Randle
- Patrick Reichelt
- Camille Rodriguez
- Simone Rota
- Jason Sabio
- Eduard Sacapaño
- Daisuke Sato
- Jaclyn Sawicki
- Stephan Schröck
- Meryll Serrano
- Jesse Shugg
- Álvaro Silva
- Martin Steuble
- Yuji Takahashi
- Paulo Junichi Tanaka
- Dionesa Tolentin
- Tomas Trigo
- Yannick Tuason
- Sebastian Ugarte
- Iñaki Vicente
- Mark Villon
- Camille Wilson
- Denis Wolf
- Sofia Harrison Wunsch
- James Younghusband
- Phil Younghusband
- Ariel Zerrudo

== Frisbee ==
- Derek Ramsay

== Golf ==
- Ben Arda
- Dottie Ardina
- Dorothy Delasin
- Rico Hoey
- Antonio Lascuña
- Ireneo Legaspi
- Rianne Malixi
- Tommy Manotoc
- Frankie Miñoza
- Clyde Mondilla
- Larry Montes
- Artemio Murakami
- Bianca Pagdanganan
- Juvic Pagunsan
- Angelo Que
- Jennifer Rosales
- Yuka Saso
- Miguel Tabuena
- Celestino Tugot

== Gymnastics ==
- Ernesto Beren
- Juancho Miguel Besana
- Reyland Capellan
- Kaitlin De Guzman
- Aleah Finnegan
- Maria-Luisa Floro
- Norman Henson
- Breanna Labadan
- Lizzy LeDuc
- Beatriz Lucero Lhuillier
- Evelyn Magluyan
- Emma Malabuyo
- Demetrio Pastrana
- Fortunato Payao
- Jasmine Ramilo
- Levi Ruivivar
- Ava Verdeflor
- Carlos Yulo
- Eldrew Yulo

== Luge ==
- Raymond Ocampo

== Martial Artists ==
- Alvin Aguilar
- Percival Alger
- Kirstie Alora
- Hergie Bacyadan
- Erwin Ballarta
- Kurt Bryan Barbosa
- John Baylon
- Amado Benito Jr.
- Jose Caballero
- Paul Cabatingan
- Ciriaco Cañete
- Samantha Catantan
- Samson Co
- Roberto Cruz
- Roland Dantes
- Celso Dayrit
- Francisco Dayrit Sr.
- Ralph de Leon
- Monsour del Rosario
- Phillip Delarmino
- James delos Santos
- Jerry Dino
- Eva Marie Ditan
- Geronimo Dyogi
- Mark Eddiva
- Adriano Directo Emperado
- Maxine Esteban
- Stephen Fernandez
- Joanna Franquelli
- Leo Gaje
- Rey Galang
- Benjamin Galarpe
- Allain Ganapin
- Fernando Garcia
- Narzal García
- Donald Geisler
- Tshomlee Go
- Richard Gomez
- Danny Guba
- Emma Henry
- Tomohiko Hoshina
- Antonio Ilustrisimo
- Mike Inay
- Shishir Inocalla
- Dan Inosanto
- Carlito A. Lanada Sr.
- Jamie Lim
- Japoy Lizardo
- Mara Lopez
- Pauline Lopez
- Gretchen Malalad
- Arnel Mandal
- Maybelline Masuda
- Benjamin McMurray
- Melchor Menor
- Samuel Morrison
- Kodo Nakano
- Meggie Ochoa
- Thomas Ong
- Daniel Parantac
- Elmer Pato
- Lester Pimentel
- Remy Presas
- Nestor Principe
- Harlene Raguin
- Annie Ramirez
- Bernardo Repuyan
- Renato Repuyan
- Christopher Ricketts
- Toni Rivero
- Jean Claude Saclag
- Vic Sanchez
- Mae Soriano
- Jasmin Strachan
- Edgar Sulite
- Jeff Tamayo
- Arvin Ting
- Justine Gail Tinio
- Walter Torres
- Junna Tsukii
- Vicente Uematsu
- Sonny Umpad
- Vic Vargas
- Walter Dean Vargas
- Florendo M. Visitacion
- Almario Vizcayno
- Willy Wang
- Kiyomi Watanabe
- Weng Weng
- Agatha Wong
- Jennifer Yeo

== Mixed Martial Arts ==
- Hyder Amil
- Kevin Belingon
- Amado Benito Jr.
- Rolando Dy
- Mark Eddiva
- Eduard Folayang
- Danny Kingad
- Jenel Lausa
- Stephen Loman
- Mark Muñoz
- Jujeath Nagaowa
- Joshua Pacio
- Mark Sangiao
- Brandon Vera

== Motorsport ==
- Maico Buncio

== Polo ==
- Anthony Garcia
- Mikee Romero

== Pool and Snooker ==
- Joven Alba
- Ronato Alcano
- Rubilen Amit
- Leonardo Andam
- James Aranas
- Carlo Biado
- Francisco Bustamante
- Chezka Centeno
- Johann Chua
- Lee Vann Corteza
- Jeff de Luna
- Antonio Gabica
- Ramil Gallego
- Roland Garcia
- Roberto Gomez
- Warren Kiamco
- Antonio Lining
- Rodolfo Luat
- Marlon Manalo
- Jundel Mazon
- Dennis Orcollo
- Alex Pagulayan
- Jose Parica
- Jharome Peña
- Anton Raga
- Efren Reyes
- Santos Sambajon

== Rowing ==
- Joanie Delgaco
- Edgardo Maerina
- Cris Nievarez
- Benjamin Tolentino

== Rugby Football ==
- Andrew Everingham
- Ben Gonzales
- Richard Goodwin
- Kevin Gordon
- Shane Gray
- Klese Haas
- Gareth Holgate
- Michael Letts
- Ada Milby
- Lito Ramirez
- Matt Saunders
- Oliver Saunders
- Paul Sheedy
- Marcus Smith
- Matt Srama
- Kenneth Stern
- Eric Tai
- Andrew Wolff

== Sailing ==
- Mario Almario
- Teodorico Asejo
- Arnold Balais
- Geylord Coveta
- Francisco Gonzales
- Feliciano Juntareal
- Policarpio Ortega
- Richard Paz
- Cherrie Pinpin
- Fausto Preysler
- Alfonso Qua
- Ambrosio Santos
- Nestor Soriano
- Christian Tio
- Juan Miguel Torres
- Jesús Villareal
- Juan Villareal
- Manuel Villareal

== Skateboarding ==
- Margielyn Didal
- Sean Malto
- Willy Santos

== Snowboarding ==
- Ryan Espiritu

== Softball ==
- Filomeno Codiñera
- Leticia Gempisao
- Laura Lehmann
- Queeny Sabobo

== Speed Skating ==
- Peter Groseclose
- Julian Macaraeg
- Kathryn Magno

== Sports Shooting ==
- José Agdamag
- Eric Ang
- Leopoldo Ang
- Enrique Beech
- Edgar Bond
- Hernando Castelo
- Emerito Concepcion
- Félix Cortes
- Jethro Dionisio
- George Earnshaw
- Albert von Einsiedel
- Lodovico Espinosa
- Adolfo Feliciano
- Martin Gison
- Otoniel Gonzaga
- Ricardo Hizon
- Cesar Jayme
- Teodoro Kalaw III
- Rasheya Jasmin Luis
- Arturo Macapagal
- Jose Medina
- Antonio Mendoza
- Horacio Miranda
- Paterno Miranda
- Mariano Ninonuevo
- Tom Ong
- Nathaniel Padilla
- Raymundo Quitoriano
- Jaime Recio
- Rafael Recto
- Paul Brian Rosario
- Pacifico Salandanan
- Bernardo San Juan
- Manuel Valdes
- Jayson Valdez

== Squash ==
- Jemyca Aribado
- Christopher Buraga
- Robert Garcia

== Sumo Wrestling ==
- Masunoyama Tomoharu

== Surfing ==
- Roger Casugay
- Mara Lopez

== Swimming ==
- Roosevelt Abdulgafur
- Jikirum Adjaluddin
- Maria Claire Adorna
- Abdurahman Ali
- Jasmine Alkhaldi
- Arsad Alpad
- René Amabuyok
- Dakula Arabani
- Ryan Arabejo
- Tony Asamali
- Luis Ayesa
- Ulpiano Babol
- Arnold Balais
- Sambiao Basanung
- Gary Bejino
- Edwin Borja
- Carlos Brosas
- Eric Buhain
- Dionisio Calvo
- Jacinto Cayco
- Pedro Cayco
- Nils Christiansen
- Raphael Matthew Chua
- Daniel Coakley
- Haydée Coloso-Espino
- Lee Concepcion
- René Concepcion
- Lorenzo Cortez
- Lizza Danila
- Nancy Deano
- Enchong Dee
- James Deiparine
- Freddie Elizalde
- Helen Elliott
- Hedy García
- Ernie Gawilan
- Luke Gebbie
- Jocelyn von Giese
- Sandra von Giese
- Leroy Goff
- Francisco Guanco
- Jenny Guerrero
- Amir Hussin Hamsain
- Jarod Hatch
- Dae Imlani
- Chloe Isleta
- Christine Jacob
- Jairulla Jaitulla
- Amman Jalmaani
- Jessie Lacuna
- Rolando Landrito
- Agapito Lozada
- Gertrudes Lozada
- Rizza Maniego
- Miguel Mendoza
- Miguel Molina
- Parsons Nabiula
- Leo Najera
- José Obial
- Nicole Oliva
- Angel Otom
- Jaclyn Pangilinan
- Raymond Papa
- Susan Papa
- Carlo Piccio
- Ahiron Radjae
- Bea Roble
- Maxime Rooney
- Gerardo Rosario
- Remedy Rule
- Bana Sailani
- Antonio Saloso
- Teia Salvino
- Kayla Sanchez
- Christel Simms
- Tuburan Tamse
- Akiko Thomson
- James Walsh
- William Wilson
- Teófilo Yldefonso
- Roxanne Yu

== Table Tennis ==
- Richard Gonzales
- Ian Lariba
- Josephine Medina

== Tennis ==
- Francis Alcantara
- Desideria Ampon
- Felicisimo Ampon
- Robert Angelo
- Johnny Arcilla
- Czarina Arevalo
- Felix Barrientos
- Andres Battad
- Marian Capadocia
- Dyan Castillejo
- Raymundo Deyro
- Miguel Dungo Jr.
- Denise Dy
- Alexandra Eala
- Pamela Floro
- Maricris Gentz
- Ruben Gonzales
- Willie Hernandez
- Treat Huey
- Khim Iglupas
- Marisue Jacutin
- Johnny Jose
- Bryan Juinio
- Francesca La'O
- Katharina Lehnert
- Alberto Lim Jr.
- Joseph Lizardo
- Jean Lozano
- Cecil Mamiit
- Alexander Marcial
- Dianne Matias
- Sofronio Palahang
- Anna Clarice Patrimonio
- Tin Patrimonio
- Jeson Patrombon
- Rod Rafael
- Jennifer Saberon
- Marissa Sanchez
- Jennifer Saret
- Roland So
- Raymond Suarez
- Eric Taino
- Patrick John Tierro
- Manny Tolentino
- Manuel Valleramos
- Riza Zalameda

== Track & Field ==
- Nenita Adan
- Amelita Alanes
- Alejo Alvarez
- Erasma Arellano
- Cendy Asusano
- Andy Avellana
- Alice Cusay Babiera
- Visitación Badana
- Loretta Barcenas
- Ciriaco Baronda
- Enrique Bautista
- Hector Begeo
- Trenten Beram
- Alexie Brooks
- Robyn Lauren Brown
- Eduardo Buenavista
- David Bunevacz
- Marites Burce
- John Cabang
- Fortunato Catalon
- Manolita Cinco
- Eric Cray
- Henry Dagmil
- Nemesio de Guzman
- Agrippina de la Cruz
- Josephine de la Viña
- Lydia de Vega
- Isidro del Prado
- Mark Harry Diones
- Miguel Ebreo
- Andres Franco
- Lerma Gabito
- Isaac Gómez
- Anselmo Gonzaga
- Mervin Guarte
- Rene Herrera
- Lauren Hoffman
- Víctor Idava
- Leonardo Illut
- Arsenio Jazmin
- Kristina Knott
- Lolita Lagrosas
- Orlando Lampa
- Edward Lasquete
- Bernabe Lovina
- Andres Lubin
- Teodoro Malasig
- Jerrold Mangliwan
- Aida Mantawel
- Tukal Mokalam
- Aida Molinos
- William Mordeno
- Elma Muros
- Nancy Navalta
- David Nepomuceno
- EJ Obiena
- Emerson Obiena
- Rogelio Onofre
- Claro Pellosis
- Niño Ramírez
- Nelly Restar
- Genaro Saavedra
- Lucila Salao
- Antonio Salcedo
- Francisca Sanopal
- Benjamin Silva-Netto
- Inocencia Solis
- Pablo Somblingo
- Herman Suizo
- Mona Sulaiman
- Mary Joy Tabal
- Gerald Tabios
- Juan Taduran
- Roger Tapia
- Simeon Toribio
- Carmen Torres
- Marestella Torres-Sunang
- Janry Ubas
- Arnulfo Valles
- Roy Vence
- Isidro Vildosola
- Remegio Vista
- Miguel White
- Regino Ylanan

== Triathlete ==
- Maxie Abad
- Maria Claire Adorna
- John Chicano
- Rudy Fernandez
- Nikko Huelgas
- Kim Mangrobang
- Raymund Torio

== Volleyball ==
- Ranran Abdilla
- Teresita Abundo
- Mark Gil Alfafara
- Kyla Atienza
- Bryan Bagunas
- Ging Balse
- Thelma Barina-Rojas
- Majoy Baron
- Bella Belen
- John Paul Bugaoan
- Angel Canino
- Tots Carlos
- Fille Cayetano
- Cha Cruz-Behag
- Rachel Daquis
- Jia de Guzman
- John Vic De Guzman
- Ella de Jesus
- Vangie de Jesus
- Pitrus de Ocampo
- Rhea Dimaculangan
- Celine Domingo
- Kim Kianna Dy
- Alyssa Eroa
- Marck Espejo
- Kim Fajardo
- Jem Ferrer
- Ara Galang
- Jema Galanza
- Dzi Gervacio
- Jovelyn Gonzaga
- Michele Gumabao
- Gretchen Ho
- Rex Intal
- Jack Kalingking
- Eya Laure
- Denden Lazaro-Revilla
- Jessie Lopez
- Dawn Macandili-Catindig
- Chris Macasaet
- Aiza Maizo-Pontillas
- Kim Malabunga
- Aby Maraño
- Ricky Marcos
- Liz Masakayan
- Kalei Mau
- Alexa Micek
- Shaina Nitura
- Maika Ortiz
- Mylene Paat
- AJ Pareja
- Detdet Pepito
- Bang Pineda
- Bernadeth Pons
- Angge Poyos
- Ish Polvorosa
- Joshua Retamar
- Mika Reyes
- Sue Roces
- Sisi Rondina
- Jonah Sabete
- Tina Salak
- Dindin Santiago-Manabat
- Jaja Santiago
- Fifi Sharma
- Grethcel Soltones
- Charo Soriano
- Pau Soriano
- Angeli Tabaquero
- Peter Torres
- Joshua Umandal
- Alyssa Valdez
- Caitlin Viray
- Deanna Wong
- Joshua Ybañez
- Zenaida Ybañez-Chavez

== Water Polo ==
- Sherwin de la Paz

== Weightlifting ==
- Samuel Alegada
- Elreen Ando
- Arnold Balais
- John Ceniza
- Gregorio Colonia
- Nestor Colonia
- Arturo Dandan
- Arturo del Rosario
- Rodrigo del Rosario
- Salvador del Rosario
- Hidilyn Diaz
- Mary Flor Diaz
- Adeline Dumapong
- Achelle Guion
- Agustin Kitan
- Pedro Landero
- Kristel Macrohon
- Alberto Nogar
- Rose Jean Ramos
- Rosegie Ramos
- Noe Rinonos
- Artemio Rocamora
- Vanessa Sarno
- Ramon Solis
- Renado Song
- Nigel Trance

== Wrestling ==
- Nicolas Arcales
- Fallah Bahh
- Dave Bautista
- Shotzi Blackheart
- Kayden Carter
- Jake de Leon
- Rogelio Famatid
- Fernando Garcia
- Enrique Jurado
- Scott Lost
- Dean-Carlos Manibog
- Job Mayo
- Gonzalo Monte-Manibog
- T. J. Perkins
- Ernesto Ramel
- Eliseo Salugta
- Antonio Senosa
- Gisele Shaw
- Syuri
- Arturo Tanaquin
- Mateo Tanaquin
- Florentino Tirante
- Tortillano Tumasis
- Francisco Vicera
- Joaquin Wilde
- Kris Wolf
- Yappy

== See also ==
- List of Filipino American sportspeople
