= Philippines at the 1964 Summer Olympics =

- Flag of the Philippines
- IOC code: PHI
- NOC: Philippine Amateur Athletic Federation

in Tokyo
- Competitors: 47 in 10 sports
- Flag bearer: Manfredo Alipala
- Medals: Gold 0 Silver 1 Bronze 0 Total 1

Summer Olympics appearances (overview)
- 1924; 1928; 1932; 1936; 1948; 1952; 1956; 1960; 1964; 1968; 1972; 1976; 1980; 1984; 1988; 1992; 1996; 2000; 2004; 2008; 2012; 2016; 2020; 2024; 2028

The Philippines competed at the 1964 Summer Olympics in Tokyo, Japan. 47 competitors (40 men and 7 women) took part in 45 events spread across 10 sports. The Philippines won its first Olympic silver medal in these games, as well as their first medal in boxing since 1932.

== Medalists ==
Medal	Name	Sport	Event	Date
Silver	Anthony Villanueva	Boxing	Men's Featherweight -57kg	21 October

== Background ==
The 1964 Olympics were held from October 10 to 24 in Tokyo, Japan, being the first event to be hosted in Asia. The event marked the 9th Olympic Games the delegation participated in, with the last participation in the 1960 Summer Olympics.

=== Qualification and delegation ===
The Philippines was supposed to host the 1963 FIBA World Championship but declined to issue Visas for players from Russia and Yugoslavia, leading FIBA founder Renato William Jones to threaten that the delegation would be excluded from the basketball events in the 1964 Olympics. To participate in the Olympics, the basketball team had to join a pre-qualifying tournament in Yokohama. The team lost the tournament, marking the first time the Philippines failed to qualify for Olympic basketball since its debut in 1936. 47 athletes were picked to participate in 10 sports in the event. Consuelo Arranz, a member of the Embassy of the Philippines, served as the attaché. Jorge B. Vargas was chosen as a delegate for the Philippine Olympic Committee for the 62nd International Olympic Committee session. The official entries for the delegate in the games were received on August 14.

=== Opening ceremony ===
The delegation was number 70 out of 81 delegates in the opening ceremony. Manfredo Alipala, a boxer, held the flag for the delegation, being the first boxer in the delegation to do so. The capital city of Manila joined the Olympic torch relay on September 3.

== Athletics ==
There were 12 athletes competing in 10 events related to athletics. Rogelio Onofre and Arnulfo Valles participated in the Men's 100 metres from October 14 to 15. Valles participated in heat two, gaining last place with a time of 11.1 seconds. Onofre participated in heat eight, gaining fifth place with a time of 10.7 seconds. None of the delegates qualified for the quarterfinals. Onofre participated in the Men's 200 metres on October 16. He participated in heat seven, gaining seventh place with a time of 22.1 seconds. Arsenio Jazmin participated at the Men's 400 metres on October 17. He participated in heat two, gaining fifth place with a time of 49.9 seconds.

Valles, Miguel Ebreo, Claro Pellosis, and Onofre participated in the Men's 4 × 100 metres Relay on October 20, gaining last place in heat three with a time of 41.7 seconds. Mona Sulaiman joined the Women's 100 metres on October 15, gaining sixth place in heat one with a time of 12 seconds.

== Boxing ==
Men's Featherweight

- Anthony Villanueva

== Cycling ==
Four cyclists represented the Philippines in 1964.

Individual road race

- Arturo Romeo
- Daniel Olivares
- Cornelio Padilla
- Norberto Arceo

Team time trial

- Norberto Arceo
- Daniel Olivares
- Cornelio Padilla
- Arturo Romeo

== Gymnastics ==
Four gymnasts, two male and two female, represented the Philippines.

Men

- Demetrio Pastrana
- Fortunato Payao

Women

- Evelyn Magluyan
- Maria-Luisa Floro

== Shooting ==
Nine shooters represented the Philippines in 1964.

25 m pistol

- Horacio Miranda
- Paterno Miranda

50 m pistol

- Edgar Bond
- Mariano Ninonuevo

300 m rifle, three positions

- Leopoldo Ang
- Bernardo San Juan

50 m rifle, three positions

- Adolfo Feliciano
- Martin Gison

50 m rifle, prone

- Adolfo Feliciano
- Pacifico Salandanan

== Swimming ==
Men

Athlete	Event	Heat		Semifinal		Final	
Athlete	Event	Time	Rank	Time	Rank	Time	Rank
Amman Jalmaani	200 m breaststroke	2:44.7	24	Did not advance			
Rolando Landrito	200 m breaststroke	2:41.9	22	Did not advance			

== Weightlifting ==
Men's Light Heavyweight

- Artemio Rocamora

== Wrestling ==
Men's Greco-Roman bantamweight

- Tortillano Tumasis (18th)

Men's Greco-Roman featherweight

- Antonio Senosa (=24th)

Men's Greco-Roman welterweight

- Job Mayo (19th)

Men's Greco-Roman middleweight

- Fernando García (=18th)

Men's freestyle bantamweight

- Tortillano Tumasis (=18th)

Men's freestyle featherweight

- Antonio Senosa (Note: also competed at the 1968 Summer Olympics) (=19th)

Men's freestyle welterweight

- Job Mayo (20th)

Men's freestyle middleweight

- Fernando García (=12th)
