= Daniel Olivares =

Daniel Olivares may refer to:

- Daniel Olivares (politician), a Peruvian politician
- Daniel Olivares (cyclist), a Filipino cyclist
