= Paolo Lofamia =

Filipino racing driver

Paolo Angelo Lofamia
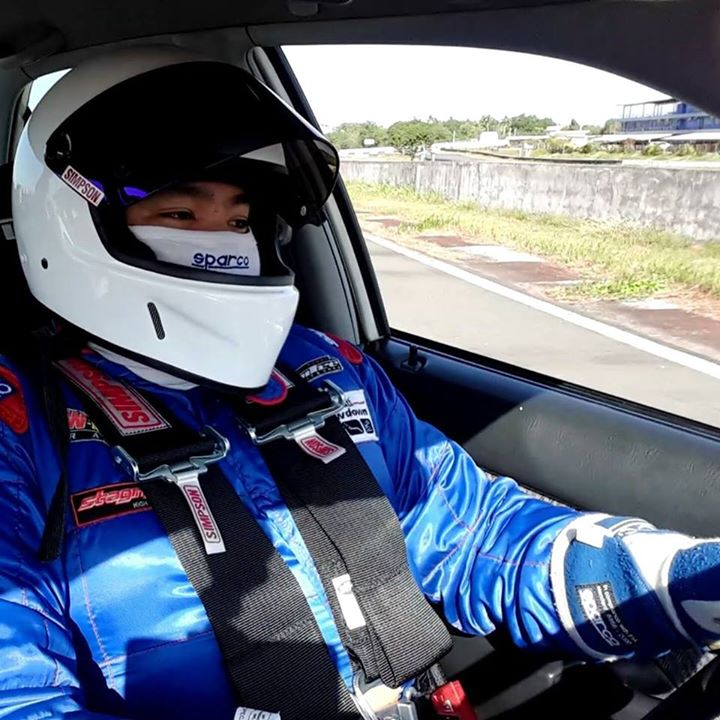
- Paolo Lofamia racing at the Batangas Racing Circuit
- Nationality: Filipino
- Born: 27 May 1989 Manila, Philippines

Racing career
- Current team: Silver Peak Racing
- Car number: 805
- Starts: 51
- Wins: 19
- Podiums: 32
- Poles: 24

Championship titles
- 2016; 2015; 2014; 2014: Flat Out Race Series (Bracket); Flat Out Race Series (Grid); Circuit Showdown (Bracket); Circuit Showdown (Grid)

Paolo Angelo Lofamia (May 27, 1989) is a Filipino racing driver, who competed for Team Staginglanes/W-Autosports from 2013 to 2017 and Silver Peak Racing in 2019.

== Racing career ==
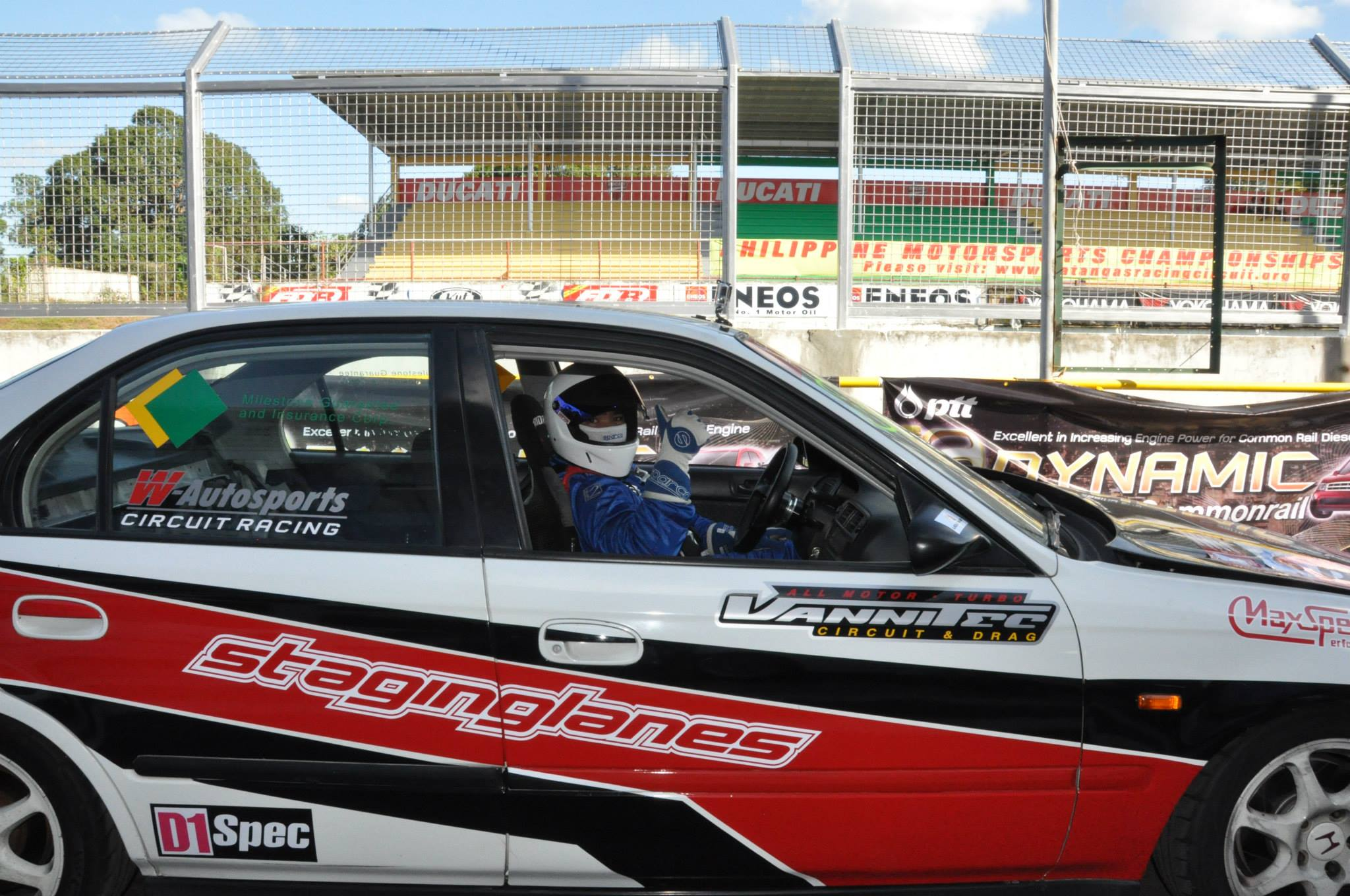
Team Staginglanes / W-Autosports race-prepped Honda Civic, built by Vannitec Racing and driven by Paolo Lofamia

Lofamia made his racing debut at the 2013 Circuit Showdown race series. Lofamia rose to fame in 2014 by winning 3 races and by being on the podium every single race in that season using a race prepped Honda Civic built by Vannitec Racing. Lofamia captured the first ever Grid D Championship of the series and on that same year he also won the Time Attack Championship in Bracket F, a feat that only a few drivers had accomplished. Lofamia is also included in the prestigious list as one of the elite drivers of the late Enzo Pastor's Circuit Showdown race series, he is regarded as one of the "COC", Champion of Champions.

In 2015 Lofamia run in the inaugural season of the Flat Out Race Series. Participating in a much faster grid and bracket than last year, he joined Grid C. He went on to win the Grid C overall championship without winning a single race. He fought his way to the top by having a drive, and managed to finish every race in the points (top 10) and clinch the 2015 Grid C title, making him the first ever Grid C Champion of the series and at the same time making him a two-time back-to-back grid champion and 3rd overall in Bracket D Time Attack Races.

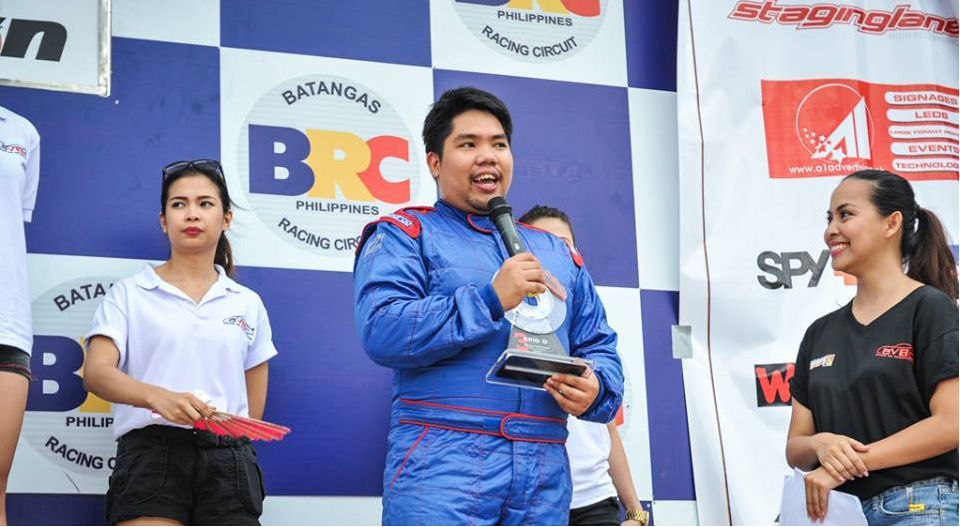
Lofamia on the podium at the Batangas Racing Circuit in 2014

2016 was the year that sealed Lofamia's name as one of the top guns of the Philippine grassroots racing. Set on a quest to win his third consecutive grid title, he went on to win the first Grid C race of the year, and was on the podium every single race after that. Sitting on top of the standings after 4 races, Lofamia is set on to grab his third competitive grid race title, but on the fifth leg of the season, Lofamia was involved in a heavy crash with his rival, Aaron Lao of Blanche Racing, sending his Staginglanes/W-Autosports Honda Civic EG flying into the wall after turn 1 in the third lap of the race. Lofamia escaped the incident unscathed. That was his first DNF of the season allowing his rivals to jump him over in the standings in terms of points, with just 3 races remaining, Lofamia was unable to catch up and finish the 2016 season trailing 6 points behind his rival Joey Howard who went on to win the 2016 Grid C title, Lofamia was 2nd overall. Time Attack races was a different story for Lofamia, where he won the 2016 Time Attack Championship in Bracket C far way ahead of his competitors, he had set the fastest time 5 out of the 8 races giving Lofamia the third Time Attack Championship title of his career.

In 2017 Lofamia took a hiatus from racing.

In 2019 Lofamia made a short and brief comeback, driving for Silver Peak Racing. Lofamia participated in the 2019 Kalayaan Cup, an 8-hour endurance race where he and his team placed 2nd overall in Class B.

== Racing record ==
=== Career summary (Grid Races) ===
Season	Series	Team	Grid	Races	Wins	Poles	Podiums	Points	Position
2013	Circuit Showdown	Staginglanes/W-Autosports	N/A	0	0	0	0	0	N/A
2014	Circuit Showdown	Staginglanes/W-Autosports	Grid D	7	3	4	5	144	1st
2015	Flat Out Race Series	Staginglanes/W-Autosports	Grid C	7	2	3	6	171	1st
2016	Flat Out Race Series	Staginglanes/W-Autosports	Grid C	7	2	5	5	153	2nd
2016	Sparco Cup	Staginglanes/W-Autosports	Group 2	1	0	0	0	0	N/A

=== Career summary (Time Attack Races) ===
Season	Series	Team	Bracket	Races	Wins	Podiums	Points	Position
2013	Circuit Showdown	Staginglanes/W-Autosports	Bracket F	5	0	0	9	19th
2014	Circuit Showdown	Staginglanes/W-Autosports	Bracket F	8	1	4	60	1st
2015	Flat Out Race Series	Staginglanes/W-Autosports	Bracket D	7	0	3	59	3rd
2016	Flat Out Race Series	Staginglanes/W-Autosports	Bracket C	8	5	7	101	1st
2016	Sparco Track Attack Challenge	Staginglanes/W-Autosports	Group 2	1	0	1	12	15th

=== Career summary (Endurance Races) ===
Season	Series	Team	Class	Position
2015	Philippine Endurance Cup	Staginglanes/W-Autosports	FM2	DNF
2019	Kalayaan Cup	Silver Peak Racing	Class B	2nd
