= Joseph Sanchez =

Joseph Sanchez may refer to:

- Joseph Sanchez (artist), artist and museum curator
- Joseph L. Sanchez, member of the New Mexico House of Representatives
- Joseph Sánchez (chess player), Cebuano chess grandmaster
- Joseph Sanchez (crime victim), transgender Belizean killed in 2014

== See also ==
- Joe Sánchez, New York City police officer and author
- Joe Sanchez (politician), politician in the U.S. state of Florida
