= Tiger General =

Tiger General (虎將, Hǔjiàng) is a Sinosphere idiom referencing particularly successful generals or successful figures in any similarly competitive field.

In particular, it may refer to:

- Five Tiger Generals, various groups of legendary and historical generals
- Five Tiger Generals of TVB, five successful actors of 1980s Hong Kong television

== See also ==
- Tiger tally, the imperial symbol of a general officer's authorization
- The Tiger General, a novel about a Vietnamese officer
- Tigers in Chinese culture
