= Benjamin Galarpe =

American father of Filipino Aikido

Benjamin G. Galarpe (US-Veteran, Ret) is considered to be the father of Aikido in the Philippines. He began training in 1957 in Guam under Harry S. Ito. Four years later he earned his Shodan (rank) degree from the Japan Aikido Hombu Dojo. He was the first Aikido representative of the Japan Aikikai Hombu Dojo to spread and propagate Aikido in the Philippines. Morihei Ueshiba, the founder of Aikido, promoted him to the degree of Nidan after advanced training in the World Aikido Hombu in Sanjukuku, Tokyo, Japan. While teaching in the Philippines, he held exhibitions in Bicol, Pampanga, Baguio, Olongapo City, Clark Air Base in Angeles City, Cebu City, Batangas City, and other places within the Philippines. Benjamin Galarpe's students, namely Chan Hok-seng, Ernesto Talag, Max Tian and Manuel "Omar" Camar, became the prime movers of the Aikido Movement in the Philippines.

In 1963, Benjamin began teaching Aikido in San Andres, Bukid, Malate, Philippines. Monching J. Gavileño, later to found the Aikido Association of the Philippines (AAP), became his first student. The school later moved to Avenida Rizal, Philippines and finally settled in Quiapo located within Metro Manila, Philippines. As of 2007 the school was known as the Manila Aikikai and was under the supervision of Manuel "Omar" Camar.

In 1965 Koichi Tohei, the chief instructor of Aikido Hombu in the World Aikido Headquarters in Tokyo, Japan visited the Aikido schools in Manila, Philippines and held Aikido exhibitions along with Benjamin Galarpe throughout the Philippines. Later that year, Koichi Tohei went on to promote Benjamin Galarpe to the rank of Sandan.

The schism between Aikikai dōshu Kisshomaru Ueshiba and the head master Koichi Tohei in the early 1970s pressured Galarpe to take sides and choose his loyalty between the Aikikai and Koichi Tohei's Ki Society. In the end, Galarpe chose Koichi Tohei and joined Shin Shin Toitsu Aikido. The now orphaned Manila Aikido Club, which Galarpe founded for the Aikikai, was left in the hands of his student Manuel "Omar" Camar.

As far as he was concerned, Galarpe's decision to ally himself with Tohei was his personal choice and was not supposed to involve any of his students nor the Manila Aikido Club. However, three of his students, Ernesto Talag of Quezon City, Chan Hok-seng of Pampanga and Max Tian of Cebu, did decide to follow Galarpe's example and remain loyal to Koichi Tohei. Ernesto Talag joined Shin Shin Toitsu Aikido and founded the Ki Society of the Philippines. Max Tian did the same thing and established the Cebu Ki Society. Chan Hok-seng, founder of the Angeles Aikido Club and long-time friend of Galarpe, decided to follow his teacher's example to the letter. But unlike Galarpe, Chan Hok-seng decided to close down his school rather than pass it on to someone else.

Galarpe returned to Guam in 1968. Once established in Guam he began teaching Aikido at the University of Guam Guam Police Science Academy for the next four years. While there, he taught college students and police recruits physical education and the arts of Aikido.

In 1972, Galarpe founded the School of Self-Defense in Guam. The school teaches Aikido under the direction of his students and family members who have gone on to become black belt Aikido instructors.

== See also ==
- John Havan#Martial arts (contributed to the development of Aikido in the Philippines beginning in the 1980s)
