= Rizza Maniego-Eala =

Filipino businesswoman

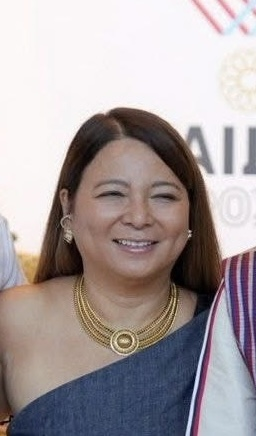
- Maniego-Eala in 2025
- Born: Rosemarie Maniego; 1968 or 1969 (age 56–57)
- Education: Ateneo de Manila University (AB)
- Occupation: Businesswoman
- Years active: c. 1991–present
- Title: Chief financial officer of Globe Telecom (2015–2024)
- Board member of: Kickstart Ventures
- Spouse: Mike Eala
- Children: 2, including Alexandra
- Relatives: Noli Eala (brother-in-law)
- Sports career
- National team: Philippines
- Sport: Swimming
- Strokes: Backstroke
Medal record
Women's swimming
Representing Philippines
Southeast Asian Games
Bronze medal – third place	Bangkok 1985	100 m backstroke

Rosemarie "Rizza" Maniego-Eala (born 1968 or 1969) is a Filipino businesswoman and former competitive swimmer. She was a bronze medalist in the women's 100-meter backstroke at the 1985 SEA Games in Thailand. Maniego-Eala later pursued a corporate career and served as the chief financial officer (CFO) of Globe Telecom, one of the Philippines' largest telecommunications companies, from 2015 until her retirement in 2024. She is also the mother of tennis player Alexandra Eala.

== Early life and swimming career ==
Maniego-Eala comes from a family of athletes. She is one of three siblings raised by Roberto "Bobby" Maniego, a sports enthusiast who would make his children do sports drills. Rizza and her sister, Nikki Maniego (now Maniego-Cachuela), both became national swimmers, while their brother, J.R. Maniego also swam and later played tennis for the UP Fighting Maroons. Growing up, Rizza described herself as an introverted and fiercely dedicated athlete—"imagine being a swimmer… so many hours, like 5 or 6 hours a day just in the water," she recalled of her training routine.

Maniego-Eala was involved in swimming from a young age and became part of the Philippine national swimming team. She achieved her most notable sporting result at the 1985 SEA Games in Bangkok, where she won the bronze medal in the women's 100 m backstroke event. She clocked a time of 1:11.36 in that event, finishing on the podium behind Indonesia's Ratna Pradipta and fellow Filipino swimmer Christine Jacob. Nikki also won a bronze medal in the 4×100 m medley relay event of the same tournament. In an interview, Maniego-Eala revealed that she had held national records in the 200-meter and 400-meter individual medley events at one point. After competing in regional meets, she stepped back from competitive swimming by the late 1980s to focus on her education and future career. Maniego-Eala graduated with a Bachelor of Arts degree in management economics from the Ateneo de Manila University.

== Business career ==
Following college, Maniego-Eala entered the finance industry. Notably, she worked at NatWest Markets, where she rose to become Deputy Research Head.

She joined Globe Telecom in February 1998 and went on to build a nearly 27-year career with the company. In the 2000s, she held key positions in Globe's expanding telecommunications and financial services ventures, including as Assistant Vice President for Financial Planning, President of G-Xchange, Inc., the Globe subsidiary that operates the mobile payment platform GCash, and Senior Vice President for International Business. As G-Xchange president, Maniego-Eala was involved in developing and promoting mobile commerce services; for example, in 2010, she announced international partnerships to expand GCash's reach.

By late 2015, Maniego-Eala was appointed acting Chief Finance Officer (CFO) of Globe Telecom, and she was confirmed as the company's CFO soon in 2017. She concurrently held the titles of treasurer and chief risk officer during her tenure. Maniego-Eala served as Globe's CFO for approximately nine years, from 2015 until October 2024. During this period, Globe underwent significant financial initiatives and industry challenges, including major capital-raising efforts and infrastructure expansion, with Maniego-Eala overseeing the company's financial strategy. Globe's leadership credited her with guiding the firm through some of its most "challenging" periods and driving key achievements for the organization.

Maniego-Eala also sat on the Board of Directors of Kickstart Ventures, Inc., a technology venture capital firm under Globe Telecom.

In 2023, she completed the Advanced Management Program at Harvard Business School.

In September 2024, Globe Telecom announced that Maniego-Eala would step down from her CFO post effective October 15, 2024. The company stated that she opted to retire after almost 27 years at Globe "to pursue other personal and professional goals". She was succeeded by Juan Carlo Puno as the new CFO.

== Personal life ==
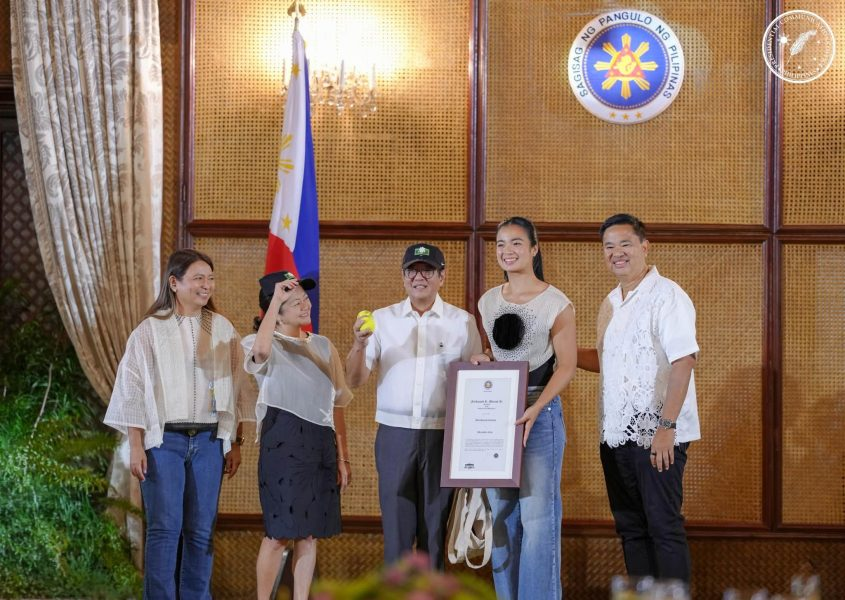
L-R: Maniego-Eala with First Lady Liza Araneta Marcos, President Bongbong Marcos, daughter Alexandra, and husband Mike in July 2026

Maniego-Eala is married to corporate executive Michael "Mike" Eala, brother of former Philippine Sports Commission chairperson and Philippine Basketball Association commissioner Noli Eala. They have two children: son Miko, a scholar at the Rafa Nadal Academy (RNA) who played for the Pennsylvania State University Nittany Lions from 2020 to 2024; and daughter Alexandra, a professional tennis player who was also a scholar at the RNA and is a junior Grand Slam champion.

== Awards and recognitions ==
Maniego-Eala's leadership at Globe earned her widespread recognition in the Asian business community.

In 2019, Maniego-Eala received two major distinctions for chief financial officers—she was named Best CFO by Institutional Investor's All-Asia Executive Team (ASEAN region) and also recognized as Best CFO for Investor Relations at the 9th Asian Excellence Recognition Awards.

In 2020, she was conferred the title of Asia's Best CFO at the 10th Asian Excellence Awards organized by Corporate Governance Asia.

In 2023, FinanceAsia's "Asia's Best Companies" poll granted Maniego-Eala a Best CFO (Bronze) award, placing her among the top chief financial officers in the region for that year.

== See also ==
- List of Ateneo de Manila University alumni
- List of Filipino sportspeople
