= Michele Bumgarner =

Filipino racing driver (born 1989)

- Born: 2 September 1989 (age 37); Mandaluyong, Metro Manila, Philippines
- Occupation: Auto racing driver

Michele Marie Bumgarner (born September 2, 1989, in Mandaluyong) is a Filipina racing driver. She was born to an American father and a Filipina mother. She made her debut into single seater racing with the National Karting Series in the Philippines in 1999 at the age of ten. She has participated in the Asia-Pacific Karting Championships Japan, Shell Super Karting Series, Asian Karting Open Championship (AKOC), and the Italian Masters Series.

In 2006, Bumgarner made her auto racing debut driving in the Asian Formula Three Championship, driving for Team Goddard. She finishing third in the series' Promotion Class standings, 11th overall, and fourth in the Philippine National F3 Driver standings.

Bumgarner competed in the first five rounds of the 2008 Star Mazda Championship season for John Walko Racing. Her best finish was 15th place coming in her final start at Portland International Raceway.

On September 19, 2008, Bumgarner became the first female champion of the Rock Island Grand Prix in Rock Island, Illinois, the world's largest street karting race. The 7th foreign-born winner in its 14-year history, Bumgarner steered the Margay Team to a 1-2-3-4 finish with 11 minutes and 24.144 seconds. She said: “This will stick with me my whole career. Everyone goes on about how great this race is and it’s special that this is my first time here and my first win here. I hope to come back.” On September 6, 2009, she successfully defended that title in a three kart battle.

In November 2008, it was announced that Bumgarner had signed a driver development contract to race in the Firestone Indy Lights series with Walker Racing. She participated in a test with Guthrie Racing However, Walker Racing entered the 2009 Indy Lights season fielding a car for Stefan Wilson rather than Bumgarner and as of 2011 she has not driven in an Indy Lights race and she has not participated in a professional auto race since 2008.

In September 2013, Bumgarner announced that she would join the Mazda Road to Indy program with World Speed Motorsports, to which she made two starts in the Pro Mazda Championship Presented by Cooper Tires at Houston, claiming a top-ten finish and earning the Quarter Master Hard Charger Award for most positions gained in the race.

In 2014, Bumgarner joined the Pro Mazda Championship full-time, racing for World Speed Motorsports Team.

== Motorsport distinctions ==
- 2013 Quarter Master Hard Charger Award for most positions gained in the race, during the Pro Mazda Championship round in Houston
- 2009 Won TaG Senior Class at Rock Island Grand Prix, for second straight year and finished third in WKA TaG Championship
- 2008 Won TaG Senior Class at Rock Island Grand Prix, the first female winner
- Selected for 2005 BMW Scholarship Award by Formula BMW Racing School in Bahrain
- 2004 Overall Champion Asian Karting Zone Championship for Open Class
- 2004 Runner-Up for Super Series Karting Philippines Open Class
- 2004 Recipient of GOLDEN WHEEL for Motorsports Driver of the Year
- 2004 Runner-Up for Formula Toyota Championships BRC
- 2004 Automobile Association of the Philippines Motorsports Award
- 2004 Philippines Sportswriters' Association Citation for Karting
- 2003 Karter of the Year, Philippines
- 2003 Motorsports Driver of the Year, Philippines
- 2003 Asian Intercontinental Junior Karting Champion

== Racing record ==
=== Complete Asian Formula Three Championship results ===
(key)

Year	Team	1	2	3	4	5	6	7	8	9	10	11	12	13	14	15	16	17	18	Rank	Points
2006	Team Goddard	BAT1; 1; 7	BAT1; 2; 11	BAT1; 3; 13	ZZIC1; 1	ZZIC1; 2	ZZIC2; 1	ZZIC2; 2	ZZIC2; 3	ZZIC2; 4	SEN; 1; 9	SEN; 2; 10	SEN; 3; 8	SEN; 4; 10	SEN; 5; 8	BAT2; 1; 6	BAT2; 2; 12	BAT1; 3; 8	BAT1; 4; 11	11th	23

=== Pro Mazda Championship ===
Year	Team	1	2	3	4	5	6	7	8	9	10	11	12	13	14	Rank	Points
2014	World Speed Motorsports	STP; 12	STP; 13	BAR; 14	BAR; 15	IMS; 16	IMS; 13	LOR; 13	HOU; 13	HOU; 11	MOH	MOH	MIL	SON; 12	SON; 20	15th	79
