= Fortunato Payao =

Filipino gymnast

- Full name: Fortunato O. Payao
- Born: March 3, 1940 (age 86)
- Height: 160 cm (5 ft 3 in)

Gymnastics career
- Discipline: Men's artistic gymnastics
- Country represented: Philippines

Fortunato O. Payao (born March 3, 1940) is a Filipino gymnast. He competed in three events at the 1964 Summer Olympics.

== Gymnastics career ==
Payao is one of the first gymnasts who represented the Philippines at the Olympics. He was among four Filipino gymnasts who competed in the 1964 Summer Olympics. The other gymnasts were Demetrio Pastrana, Evelyn Magluyan, and Maria-Luisa Floro. He finished in 129th place in the men's individual all-around with 19.00 points. In the floor exercise, he tallied 11.50 and he tallied 7.50 in vault.
