= Maybelline Masuda =

Filipino jiu-jitsu practitioner

- Born: Maybelline Masuda; May 14, 1989 (age 37); Calamba, Laguna, Philippines
- Nationality: (Philippines) Filipino
- Style: Brazilian Jiu-Jitsu, Japanese ju-jitsu, Yaw-Yan
- Team: Deftac Philippines
- Teacher: Alvin Aguilar
- Rank: Black Belt

Other information
- University: De La Salle University Manila
- Website: ninjamissmasuda.wordpress.com

Maybelline Masuda is a Filipino Brazilian Jiu-Jitsu practitioner. She has earned the Philippines prestige by winning and becoming the first Filipino Brazilian Jiu-Jitsu World Champion as a white belt in 2009 and for winning the country's first gold medal at the Asian Beach Games for Ju Jitsu in 2014.

== Early life ==
Maybelline Masuda was born in Calamba, Laguna. Her mother, Victoria Constantino is a native of Quezon and her father, Douglas Masuda is a Japanese-American from California who is a retired lawyer and an Elvis Tribute Artist, known as the Elvis of Japan.

== Career ==
At age 15, Masuda was introduced to the Filipino martial art of Yaw-Yan and later joined a Yaw-Yan Buhawi Vale Tudo tournament where she won a gold medal. At age 18, during her 3rd year in college at De La Salle University Manila, she was encouraged by a friend to join a Brazilian Jiu-Jitsu class held in school and led by URCC MMA Champion Allan Co and DEFTAC Philippines coach Pichon Garcia, due to her prior experience in Yaw-Yan. They eventually invited her to train and join the team Deftac in 2008, where she met Alvin Aguilar, the first home-grown Filipino Brazilian jiu-jitsu 1st degree blackbelt and founder of the URCC. With Hard work and dedication, she further developed her special talent in Jiu Jitsu under his guidance.

As a white belt, Masuda won the lightfeather weight title at the 2009 World Brazilian Jiu-Jitsu Championships, becoming the first Filipino to win a title at the tournament.

In 2012, she was promoted to purple belt by her mentor Aguilar which made her the first Filipina Purple belt in Brazilian jiu-jitsu.

She is among the two who brought home the first gold medals for the Philippines at the Asian Beach Games during the 2014 edition in Phuket, Thailand. She won a medal in Ju-jitsu in the -50 kg category beating Le Thu Trang Dao of Vietnam in the gold medal match. The other one who bagged the other gold medal following her victory was Annie Ramirez also a jiu-jitsu practitioner.

On September 21, 2016, she was promoted and became the first home-grown Filipina brown belt. On June 30, 2018, she was promoted and became the first homegrown Filipina black belt
