= Arnold Balais =

Filipino paralympic athlete

Personal information
- Nickname: Capt. A
- National team: Philippines
- Born: March 16, 1974 (age 51)
- Home town: Dinalupihan, Bataan, Philippines
- Occupation(s): Athlete, vocational coordinator, orthotic and prosthetic technician, motivationa speaker
- Employer: Cebu Doctors University
- Children: 3

Sport
- Country: Philippines
- Sport: Weightlifting, swimming, boat racing
- Disability: Above-the-knee amputee
- Team: PADS Dragon Boat Team

Arnold "Capt. A" Balais (born March 16, 1974) is an above-the-knee-amputee Filipino paralympic athlete, vocational coordinator, orthotic and prosthetic technician. He is known for being the team captain of the Philippine Accessible Disability Service (PADS) Dragon Boat Team.

== Early life and career ==
At 14, Balais got his right leg amputated, caused by chronic osteomyelitis. In 1990, Balais suffered a broken bone during a freak basketball accident. Doctors decided to amputate his right leg a year after being bedridden to prevent the infection from spreading. He was fitted with an artificial leg at the University of Santo Tomas. Later, Balais was offered a job at the UST Hospital as a vocational coordinator for PWDs (Persons with Disabilities).

== Sports ==
=== Weightlifting ===
Inspired by his brother, who worked in the Middle East as a gym trainer, Balais tried weightlifting at a local gym to restore his confidence. Eventually, Monty Mendigoria, a Philippine powerlifter, discovered him and provided him with a bodybuilding program modified for his needs. In 1996, Balais represented the Philippine team in a Paralympics competition in the United States, where he finished 12th among 24 athletes worldwide.

=== Swimming ===
After moving to Cebu, Balais challenged himself by getting into a new sport. This time, he focused on swimming four hours a day to strengthen the weaker side of his body. In 1999, Balais participated in the Philspada National Games and took home gold medals in swimming. His victory allowed Balais to represent the Philippine team in various competitions in the US, Malaysia, Australia, Thailand, Vietnam, and Korea.

=== Mountain climbing ===
In 2013, Balais became the first amputee to scale Mount Apo, the highest mountain in the Philippines. In two days, he conquered the peak, which was 2,954 meters (9,692 ft) above sea level, with the help of two assistants and two physical therapists. In 2023, Balais organized the "Climb for Everlasting Hope" to raise funds for Everlasting Hope Cebu, a non-profit organization helping around 200 children battling cancer. The climb also marks the 10th anniversary of his first climb on the mountain.

=== Boat racing ===
Balais is the team captain of the Philippine Accessible Disability Service (PADS) Dragon Boat Team, a cross-disability adaptive team. The PADS Dragon Boat Team has brought honor to the country several times in both local and international competitions, including the 1st Naga Invitational Dragon Boat Race, Hong Kong International Dragon Boat Races in 2017 and 2018, the 14th IDBF World Dragonboat Racing Championship and the Club Crew World Championships in Sarasota, Florida in 2022. The team also made history as the first Para-Dragon boat champion in the world.

== Achievements ==
Among Balais' achievements include bagging the gold for bench press powerlifting in the 10th Malaysian Paralympics in 2002, winning both silver and bronze medals for the 100-meter butterfly and freestyle relay swimming events at the 4th ASEAN Paralympic Games in Thailand in 2008, and being the first amputee to reach the peak of Mount Apo in 2013.

Balais was also honored as an outstanding individual by the city government of Cebu during its Charter Day celebration.

== TV commercials/appearances ==
Balais was a television commercial model for Unilab Philippines from 2017 to 2019. He was also featured in several news outlets in the country, including GMA Integrated News' 24 Oras in 2019, ABS-CBN Entertainment in 2021, and CNN Philippines in 2022.

== Personal life ==
Balais is married with three children. He works at Cebu Doctors University in Mandaue City, Cebu as the Laboratory Instructor for Physical and Occupational therapy students, a senior Prosthetic technician, and a patient advocate. Balais is also an inspirational and motivational speaker nationwide.

== See also ==
- Paralympic Games
- Paralympic Committee of the Philippines
- Philippine Dragon Boat Federation
