= Mandarin (Havan novel) =

2008 novel by John Havan

- Author: John Havan
- Language: English
- Genre: Historical fiction
- Publisher: Orchid Press
- Publication date: March 2, 2008
- Publication place: Thailand
- Media type: Print (paperback)
- Pages: 332 p.
- ISBN: 978-9-74-524100-8

Mandarin, subtitled A Novel of Viet Nam, is a novel by John Havan. The protagonist, Bach, is the first-born son of the most powerful mandarin at the Nguyễn dynasty court in Hue.

At the time of Bach's birth, Vietnam's historical feudal system is locked in a struggle with French colonial exploitation, Japanese imperialism, and Ho Chi Minh's communist fanatics. Bach grows up to be a robust and handsome young man, irresistible to the women in his life, brilliant at his studies and with a natural gift for the martial arts, but his way of life is doomed in the cataclysmic birth throes of the modern Vietnamese socialist state. The book is an epic tale of love and war, struggle, loss, and rebirth.

The novel covers the period from 1883 to 1954, spanning the decline of French colonialism through the First Indochina War. The author, John Havan, drew on personal experience: born in Paris in 1933 to a Vietnamese father and a British mother, he worked in South Vietnam from 1955 to 1972 for a US defence contractor, during which time he became fluent in Vietnamese and had direct contact with figures across the political and military spectrum of the era.

A sequel, The Tiger General, chronicles the life of Bach's son, Hai.
