= PADS Dragon Boat Team =

Philippines' first cross-disability adaptive dragon boat racing team

- Full name: Philippine Accessible Disability Service Dragon Boat Team
- Nicknames: PADS Dragon Boat Team
- Short name: Adaptive Dragon Boat Team
- Sport: Dragon boat racing
- Founded: September 2016; 9 years ago
- Location: Cebu City, Philippines
- CEO: John Paul "JP" Maunes
- Manager: John Paul "JP" Maunes
- Captain: Arnold "Capt. A" Balais
- Website: PADS Website

Philippine Accessible Disability Service Dragon Boat Team, also known as PADS Dragon Boat Team, is a non-profit, non-governmental organization that aims to enable persons with disability (PWDs) to grow and develop as independent, integrated, and empowered citizens of society.

The Cebu-based dragon boat team comprises people with disabilities — some are amputees, while others are deaf or blind. PADS Dragon Boat Team is the first cross-disability adaptive dragon boat racing team in the Philippines.

== History ==
John Paul "JP" Maunes, CEO and team manager, founded the Philippine Accessible Deaf Services (PADS), which organized sports, health, and advocacy campaigns for the Deaf community in Cebu and its neighboring communities. Driven by his time spent with Stephanie Kanter and Derek Daniels, mentors at the Rehabilitation Institute of Chicago, Maunes changed the name of his organization from "Deaf" to "Disability" to include people of all disabilities.

Composed of mixed disabilities, PADS Dragon Boat Team was formed around September 2016 and had its first dragon boat competition in Dumaguete City in November.

In June 2022, with support from the Australian Embassy, PADS broke ground with its first Adaptive Sports and Rehabilitation Center in Mandaue City, Cebu. In July 2022, during their Manila preparations, SM Cares supported and treated the PADS athletes with accommodations at Heritage Hotel Manila and a "Fun Day at the Mall" tour at SM Mall of Asia, SM Southmall, and S'Maison.

In December 2022, during their visit to Mandaue City, Australian Ambassador to the Philippines Hae Kyong Yu led the turnover to the PADS of around a million Australian dollars' worth of sports equipment and projects, including a 20-seater dragon boat.

The Department of Tourism also applauds PADS for their historic win at the International Dragon Boat Federation's (IDBF) 13th Club Crew World Championships in Sarasota, Florida.

The team made history as the first Filipino para dragon boat team to compete and won the Para Dragon Boat Category.

== Competitions ==
=== Local ===
Year	Event	Venue	Awards	Category
2017	1st Naga Invitational Dragon Boat Race	Naga City, Cebu	Silver, Bronze	
2019	Sandugo Dragon Boat Festival	Tagbilaran City	Gold (2)	Small Boat Women's Category, Small Boat Open Masters Category

=== International ===
Year	Event	Venue	Awards	Category
2017	Paradragon Division of the Hong Kong International Dragon Boat Races	Hong Kong	Gold	
2018	9th Hong Kong Dragon Boat Festival	Victoria Harbour	Gold	
2019	14th International Dragon Boat Federation (IDBF) World Nations Championships	Pattaya, Thailand	Gold (4), Silver (2), Bronze (4)	
2022	13th International Dragon Boat Federation's Club Crew World Championships	Sarasota, Florida	Gold (4)	2000m PD2, 500m PD2, 200m PD1, 200m PD2

== Recognitions ==
- In 2018, PADS was conferred the Modern-Day Hero Award during the celebration of National Heroes Day.
- In 2019, PADS was named one of the 10 TAYO (Ten Accomplished Youth Organizations) Awards finalists from PLDT wireless unit Smart Communications.
- On November 6, 2019, PADS paid a courtesy visit to then-President Rodrigo Roa Duterte at the Malacañang Palace, awarded a cash incentive of P500,000, and promised to sponsor brand new prosthetic legs for the amputee paddlers.

== See also ==
- Philippine Dragon Boat Federation
