= Francisco C. Ventura =

Francisco "Paco" C. Ventura, also known as Paquito, was a pioneer of motor racing in the Philippines in the 1960s. The Golden Wheel Awards Foundation inducted him into the Hall of Fame on March 3, 2012. This award was presented to Ventura by Dante Silverio in the Tanghalang Aurelio Tolentino Theatre in the Cultural Center of the Philippines.

== Biography ==
Ventura was born in 1931 in Manila, Philippines. Born into a family of 12 siblings, he was the youngest of 4 brothers. Ventura's interest in racing began in 1956, when, while stopping at a red light, a car approached with the intent of racing. The car belonged to Conrado "Dodo" Ayuyao, who later became one of his closest friends. Ayuyao knew a group of car enthusiasts that met on Sundays. They tested their engine's performance by drag racing at Nielson Field in Makati. However, Ventura had other interests outside of racing. In 1958, he established his own business, Win-Dor Steel Mfg.

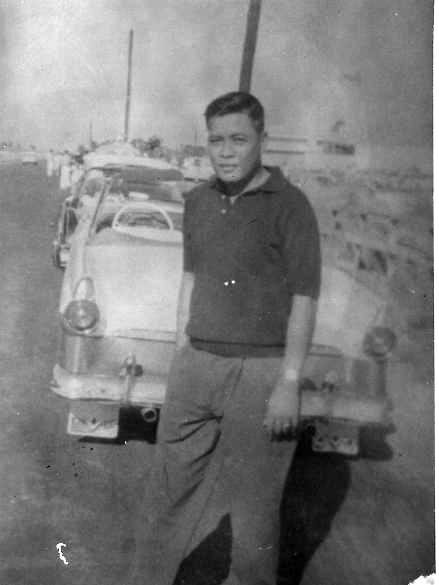
Ventura with the car that began his racing career.

== Cam Wreckers Association ==
Ventura regularly met with other speed aficionados including Dodjie Laurel, Bob Smith, Ruben Saulog, Joe Cacho, Jun Campillo, Eugene, and Sam SyCip. Together with Ayuyao, this group formed the first official motor racing club in the Philippines, the Cam Wreckers Association. When trying to come up with a name, their mechanic kept interrupting and complaining that he needed more cam shafts because they were always breaking, hence, the start of the Cam Wreckers Club. The club's objective was to invite others to race cars, go-karts, boats and to compete locally and internationally.

== Racing achievements ==
1961, Pasig, Philippines. Drag Jamboree Class B. Ventura won third place (Manolo Maceda first and Billy Martinez second).
1962, Tokyo, Japan. International Invitational Go-Kart Race at the Johnson Tachikawa Air Base. Ventura placed third (Dodjie Laurel first and Joe Cacho second).
1962, Macau, China. Ventura won first in a 30-lap ACP class.
1963, Manila, Philippines. Ventura won the Grand Prix Kart Race in Luneta.
1964, Manila, Philippines. Won first at the Shell Car Rally.
1964, Mandaluyong, Philippines. Won first at the Enduro Go Kart Race.
1964, Outstanding Motor Sportsman of the Year. Cover page of the Philippine Herald Magazine.
1966, Manila, Philippines. Won first at the Philippine Karting Prix in Luneta.
1969, Cebu, Philippines. Won second, First Philippine Grand Prix (Chito Montserrat won first).

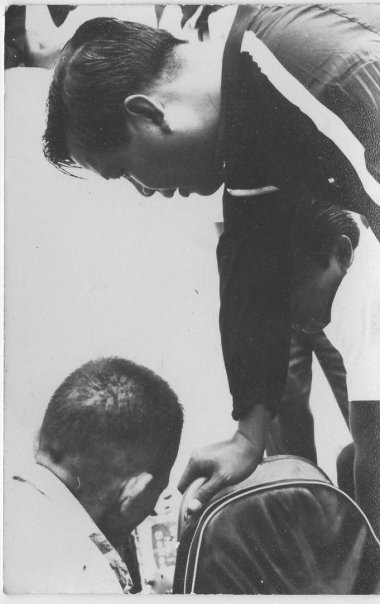
Ventura with his mechanic Temiong setting up for the next go-kart race.

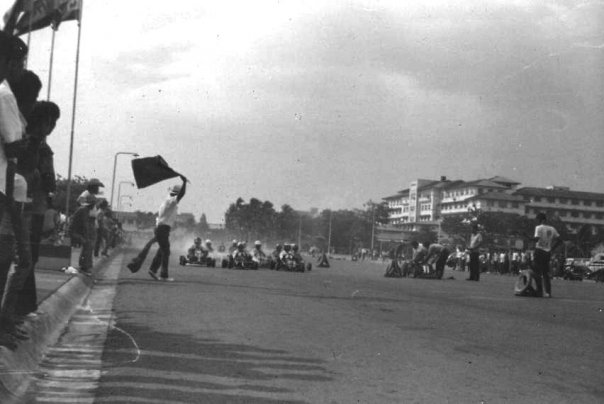
Green flag waves to start the Manila Karting Prix in Luneta.

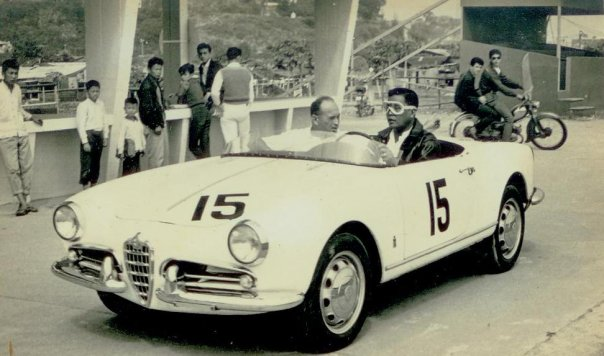
Ventura in Macau in his Alfa Romeo Giulietta Spider that won him first in a 30-lap ACP class race, 1962

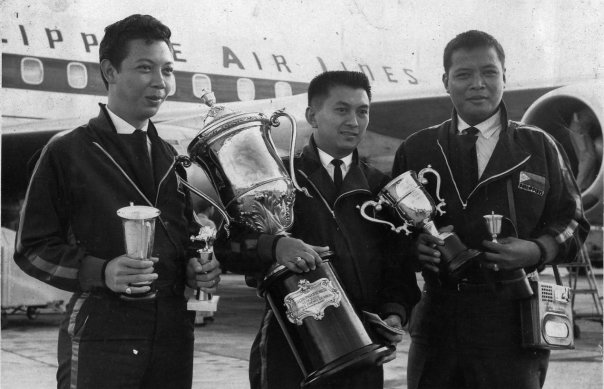
R to L: Ventura, Dodjie Laurel and Joe Cacho arrived from Macau, 1962

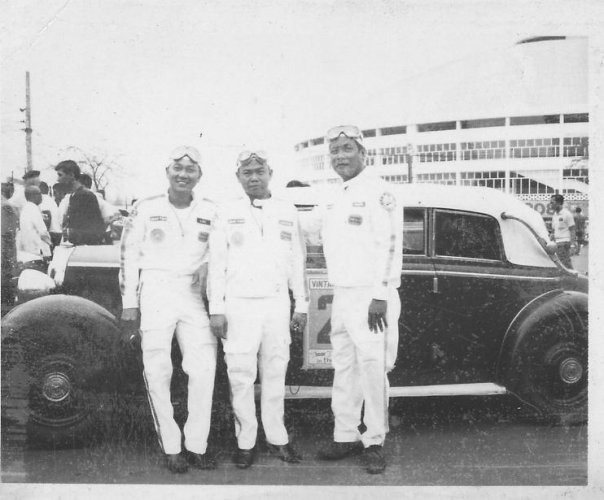
R to L: Ventura, Manolo Maceda, and Johnny Lee team up for a Vintage Car Rally

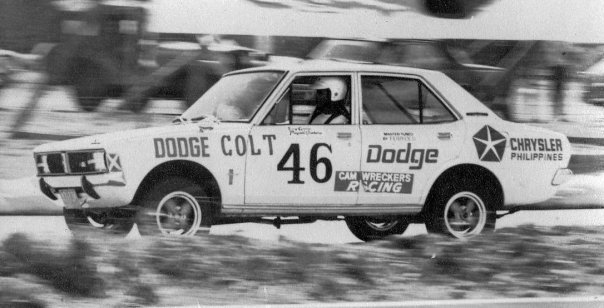
An endurance test of man and machine. Ventura teams up with Tony Gana in this 100-lap race using a Dodge Colt.

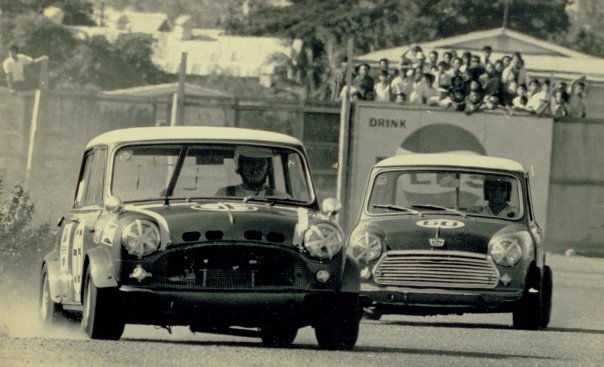
Ventura running first until engine trouble at the last lap, 30 meters to go. Paco Ventura finished second.

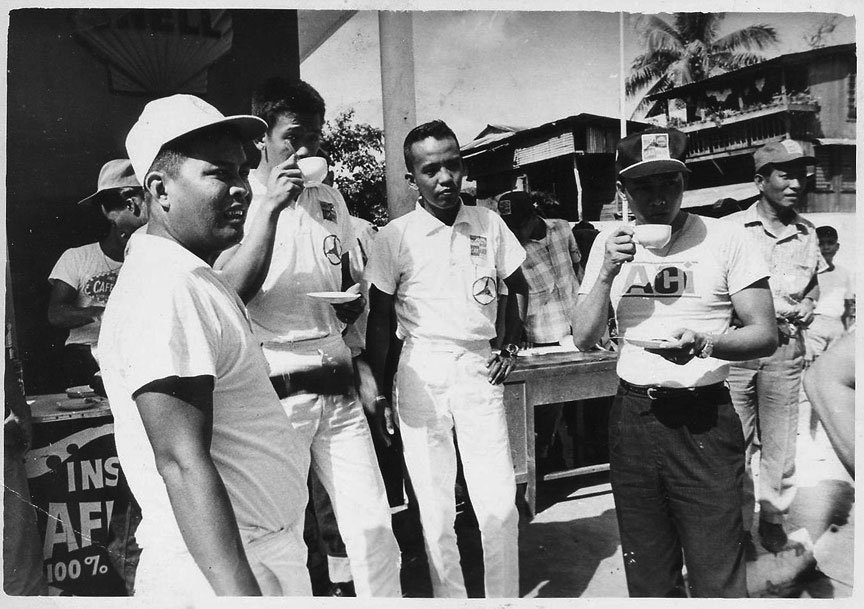
Paco Ventura Team, Winner of the 1964 Philippine Shell Car Rally.
