= Lito Ramirez =

- Born: March 17, 1995 (age 31) Philippines
- Height: 1.70 m (5 ft 7 in)
- Weight: 56 kg (8 st 11 lb)

Rugby union career
- Position: Fly-half / Winger / Full-back
- Current team: Mavericks Rugby Club 2015
Amateur team(s)
Years	Team	Apps	(Points)
2012–	Mavericks Rugby Club		
2014-2015	Clark Jets		
National sevens team
Years	Team		Comps
2015–	Philippines		

Lito Ramirez is a Philippine international rugby union and rugby sevens player. Ramirez is the first homegrown player who was the product of the grassroots program of the Philippine Rugby Football Union to become part of the national rugby team when he was named part of the rugby sevens squad that participated at the 2015 ARFU Men's Sevens Championships in July 2015.fly-half in local rugby union games but a winger and full-back

Ramirez plays as a fly-half locally but plays as a winger and full-back for the Philippine national team.

== Early life ==
Ramirez was a street urchin since the age of five and was later abandoned in the streets of Quezon City, Metro Manila by his parents when he was seven years old. He also has an older brother Jay. He had no birth certificate and is unsure of his age when he was abandoned but celebrates his birthday on March 17, 1995. He was taken to the shelter for children in Quezon City at age 11 and was transferred to the Tuloy Foundation, an orphanage and school for street children in Muntinlupa. His surname was derived from the person who took him to the shelter for children.

== Career ==
At age 13 at the Tuloy Foundation, Ramirez first learned about rugby and took up the sport after having played basketball and football, having mistaken it for the brand of contact cement he used to sniff in the streets. Rocky Evangelista, the priest founder of the institution has discouraged Ramirez and other boys who showed interest to the sport due to its physical nature, although later reluctantly allowed the boys to play touch rugby. Ramirez and his Tuloy peers watched YouTube videos of rugby players Shaun Johnson, Benji Marshall and Dan Carter and imitated their movements. The Tuloy rugby team then came to beat various teams in Manila and the Philippines, including squads from international schools. Ramirez himself was called up to the under-16 and under-18 Philippine national teams. The Tuloy youths however wanted to regular rugby where tackle is allowed.

Ramirez and some of his peers from Tuloy, left the foundation in 2012 to join the Mavericks Rugby Club which was founded in 2011 by New Zealander, Bill Brown, Rick Santos, current PRFU President and Mike Flynn, Head of Operations at International School Manila. He managed to become part of the national men's development squad in 2014. He participated at the 2015 Philippine National Games as part of the Clark Jets team and won a gold medal. It was his stint with the Clark Jets that led to his inclusion to the training squad of the Philippine national rugby sevens team and was later named as part of the squad that participated at the 2015 ARFU Men's Sevens Championships, becoming the first homegrown player to be named as part of the national team.

In July 2016 Lito was awarded a four-week international rugby scholarship by the Inside Running Rugby Academy of New Zealand. Mavericks Rugby Club sponsored him in terms of his airfare and living and spending money, but the Inside Running Academy organization covered his accommodation, breakfast and lunch and more importantly for Lito 4 weeks of intense rugby training, where he even got to play against local club players.

== Personal life ==
As of May 2016, Ramirez along with Jayson Fabon, his Mavericks long-time peer, currently resides in a house he rents in Muntinlupa. His stint as a rugby player helped him secure a job with the Philippine Rugby Football Union as a development officer to coach rugby in schools and universities.
