= Raymund Torio =

Raymund Molano Torio (born August 8, 1988) is a Filipino triathlete and member of the Go For Gold Philippines Triathlon team. He has competed in several international competitions, most notably the Southeast Asian Games for Duathlon in 2021 in Hanoi, Vietnam.

Torio is from Lingayen, Pangasinan, and has been participating in running, duathlon, and triathlon events since childhood. He has been with the Go For Gold Philippines Triathlon team since 2018.

Torio emerged in sixth place in the Standard Men Elite category at the 2023 Asia Triathlon Duathlon Championship. He also won the top overall honors for the male categories in the 2023 Clark Duathlon Classic in March 2023.
