= Richard Goodwin (sportsman) =

Filipino-Australian sportsman

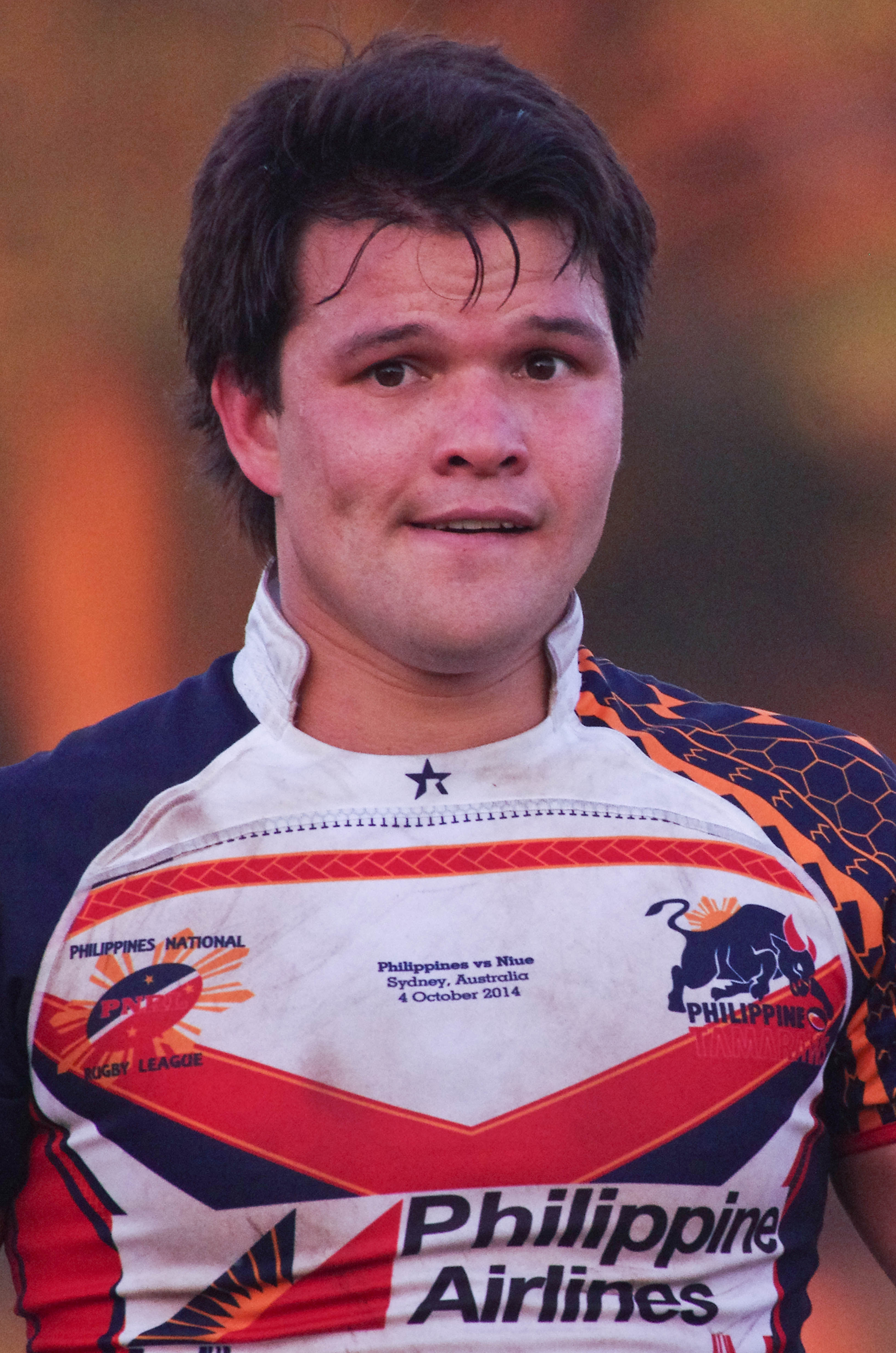

Personal information
- Full name: Richard Goodwin
- Born: 8 March 1987 (age 39)
- Batting: Right-handed
- Bowling: Right-arm offbreak
- Role: Batsman

International information
- National side: Philippines
- T20I debut (cap 2): 22 March 2019 v PNG
- Last T20I: 24 February 2022 v Germany
- Source: Cricinfo, 24 February 2022
- Rugby league career

Playing information
- Position: Fullback
Representative
Years	Team	Pld	T	G	FG	P
2012–21	Philippines	11	6	2	0	28
- Source: Rugby League Project As of 19 October 2021

Rugby union career
National sevens team
Years	Team	Comps
2012	Philippines	1

Richard Goodwin (born 8 March 1987) is a Filipino-Australian sportsman who has represented the Philippines national cricket team, national rugby league team, and national rugby sevens team.

== Sporting career ==
=== Cricket ===
Goodwin plays for the Cromer Cricket Club in the Manly Warringah Cricket Association, where he captains the First Grade side. In March 2019, he was named in the Philippines squad for the Regional Finals of the 2018–19 ICC T20 World Cup East Asia-Pacific Qualifier tournament. He made his Twenty20 International (T20I) debut against Papua New Guinea on 22 March 2019.

He was part of the Philippines team for the 2022 ICC Men's T20 World Cup Global Qualifier A tournament in Oman.

=== Rugby sevens ===
Goodwin represented the Philippines in rugby sevens at the 2012 Shanghai Sevens. He kicked a conversion in the match against Malaysia.

=== Rugby league ===
Goodwin has represented the Philippines in rugby league since the team's formation in 2012. He was a member of their squad for the 2018 Emerging Nations World Championship. After a two-year hiatus from professional competition by the Philippines, Goodwin appeared in their international return against Brazil on 13 June 2021.
