= The Tiger General =

2011 novel by John Havan

- Author: John Havan
- Language: English
- Genre: Historical fiction
- Publisher: Orchid Press
- Publication date: 2011
- Publication place: Thailand
- Media type: Print (paperback)
- Pages: 332 p.
- ISBN: 978-9-74-524135-0

The Tiger General, subtitled The Memoirs of a Vietnamese Intelligence Chief, is a novel by John Havan. It was first published in 2011, and is a sequel to the 2008 novel Mandarin.

== The plot ==
The protagonist, Hai, is the illegitimate son of Bach, the protagonist of the preceding work. A born survivor, Hai continually re-invents himself under the French, Viet Minh and Japanese regimes. At thirty-six years of age, he comes into his own and his rise is unstoppable, emerging as the 'Tiger General' in the South Vietnamese Republic.

The main part of the book is based on the communist Vietnamese spy, Pham Xuan An. who was a friend of the author many years.

== Reviews ==
- Ezra Kyrill Erker (January 29, 2012). "In the eyes of a 'TigerGeneral'". The Bangkok Post. "On the cover it's a memoir, the foreword says the book is indebted to its main subject and the copyright page claims it's a work of fiction. The Tiger General is certainly too accurate in its historical, cultural and espionage details for the characters to be entirely invented, and with a complete absorption in time and place difficult to pull off with such precision in fiction."
- "The Tiger General : The Memoirs of a Vietnamese Intelligence Chief by John Havan". purreview.cf. Archived from the original on January 5, 2018. "A gripping and unforgettable saga of struggle, bravery, love and loss amid one of the most turbulent periods of the 20th century, by an author who writes with the authority of one who lived through many of the events he describes."
