= Philippine Dragon Boat Federation =

- Sport: Dragon Boat Racing
- Jurisdiction: Philippines
- Membership: 37 teams with 3,500 athletes
- Abbreviation: PDBF
- Founded: 2003
- Affiliation: International Dragon Boat Federation
- Regional affiliation: Asian Dragon Boat Federation
- Headquarters: Manila
- President: Atty. Jay Pee Villanueva
- Secretary: Marcia Cristobal

Official website
- pdbfsport.com
- (Philippines)

The Philippine Dragon Boat Federation is the national sports association for dragon boat racing in the Philippines. The Philippine Dragon Boat Federation is one of the founding members of the International Dragon Boat Federation (IDBF) and recognized by the IDBF as the specific Governing Body for Dragon Boat racing in the Philippines. It is also a member of the South East Asian Traditional Boat Federation and the Asian Dragon Boat Federation. It succeeded the Amateur Rowing Association of the Philippines, as the responsible body for handling dragon boat teams in the country.

The PDBF and their member national teams used to be recognized by the Philippine Olympic Committee and the Philippine Sports Commission. But in a politically doubtful move, amid its standing world records, and despite its stellar performance as a national sports association, POC and PSC support was withdrawn, leading to the recognition of a canoeing and kayaking sports organization as NSA for dragon boat.

Despite withdrawal of POC and PSC recognition, sans due process required by the POC bylaws, the International Dragon Boat Federation, the Asian Dragon Boat Federation, and the South East Asian Traditional Boat Federation continue to recognize the PDBF as the sole national governing body for dragon boat sport in the Philippines up to this day. As a private organization, the PDBF continues to win and represent the Philippines in world championships and international dragon boat competitions.

== Members ==
PDBF members
Team	Home town/city
AIMS Blue Sharks	Manila / Pasay City
Amateur Paddlers Philippines (AmPPhi)	Manila / Quezon City
Amateur Paddlers Philippines - Davao (AmPPhi)	Davao
Baghawi Dragon Boat Team	Manila
BJMP Metal Dragons	Manila / Mandaluyong City
Bohol Paddlers Association Inc. (BPAI)	Bohol
Bomba Pilipinas Dragon Boat Team	Manila
Boracay Allstars Dragonboat Team	Boracay Island, Malay, Aklan
Bruins: Racers of the High Seas	Manila
Bugsay San Carlos	San Carlos City, Negros Occidental
Dragons Republic Paddlers Club	Manila
Hurricane Alpha Racing Dragons	Filipinos in Bahrain
Iloilo Paddlers Club	Iloilo City, Province of Iloilo
Maharlika Drakon	Manila
Manila Klasiko Dragon Boat Team	Manila
NTMA	Laguna
One Piece Drakon Sangres (OPDS)	Manila
Onslaught Racing Dragons	Manila
Philippine Accessible Disability Services (PADS) Dragon Boat Racing Team	Cebu
PEMCOR Paddlers Dragon Boat Team	Manila
Philippine Air Force Dragon Boat Team	Manila
Philippine Coast Guard Dragon Boat Team	Manila
Philippine Navy Dragon Boat Team	Taguig City
Pirates Dragon Boat Team	Manila
PNP Maritime Group	Metro Manila
PNP Patriots	Metro Manila
Polillo Dragon Boat Association	Polillo, Quezon
RAMpage Dragonboat Paddlers Club	Metro Manila
Rogue Pilipinas Paddlers Club	Manila
Rowers Club Philippines Sea Dragon	Manila
Seahawks PH Dragon Boat Team	Manila
Sigasig Dragón	Manila
Speed Devilz Dragon Boat Club	Manila
Triton Philippines	Manila
United Paddlers Club	Manila
University of the Philippines Dragonboat Team	Quezon City
Valhalla Dragon Boat Team	Manila
1 Fortis Dracones	Filipinos in Singapore
