= Arturo del Rosario =

Filipino weightlifter

Personal information
- Nationality: Filipino
- Born: 12 May 1953 (age 71)

Sport
- Sport: Weightlifting

Arturo del Rosario (born 12 May 1953) is a Filipino weightlifter. He competed at the 1972 Summer Olympics and the 1976 Summer Olympics.
