= Mario Almario =

Filipino sailor (born 1934)

Personal information
- Nationality: Filipino
- Born: July 18, 1934 (age 92)

Sailing career
- Sport: Sailing
- Club: Philippine Sailing Association
- Class: Sailing

Mario Almario (born July 18, 1934) is a Filipino sailor. He represented the Philippines at the 1972 Summer Olympics in Kiel. Almario took 26th place in the Soling with Alfonso Qua and Ambrosio Santos as fellow crew members. Almario also represented his country at the 1976 Summer Olympics in Kingston, Ontario where he took 28th place in the Finn. His last Olympic appearance was during the 1992 Summer Olympics in Barcelona in the Soling with Juan Miguel Torres and Teodorico Asejo as fellow crew members. The team took the 24th place.
