= Circuit Showdown =

Philippine auto racing series from 2010

- Category: Touring Cars
- Country: Philippines
- Inaugural season: 2010
- Official website: circuitshowdown.com

Circuit Showdown was a Philippine auto racing series that began in 2010 and was organized by Enzo Pastor and Dalia Pastor. It was the only circuit racing series in the country that is open to both amateur and professional drivers.

== Tracks ==
The series runs throughout the year alternating between the major race venues in the Philippines, including the Clark International Speedway (CIS), and the Batangas Racing Circuit. In 2010, the series ran a few legs on the now defunct Subic International Raceway (SIR).

== Entry list ==
Teams from all over the country ranging from car clubs to manufacturers participate. Each team accumulates points through each driver's points. The team with the most points are declared Team Champion at the end of the season. Points are awarded to the top ten drivers in each bracket and points added to each bracket they qualify in. At the end of the season, each of the six brackets for the time trials will have a winner as well as three brackets for the grid.
