= Yaw-Yan =

Filipino martial art

- Also known as: Sayaw ng Kamatayan, Dance of Death, Filipino Martial Art
- Focus: Hybrid
- Country of origin: Philippines
- Creator: Napoleon A. Fernandez. Orlando Boy A. Fernandez Sr, Melvin Manota Fernandez
- Famous practitioners: Alvin Aguilar, Eduard Folayang, George Estregan, Ruben Sumido, Robin Padilla, Benigno "Ekin" Caniga Jr, Henry Kobayashi, Rey Yap, Rennie Ross, Emiliano Zapata
- Parenthood: Boxing, Muay Thai, Panantukan, Escrima, Sikaran, Jeet Kune Do, Japanese martial arts particularly Judo, Jujutsu, and two styles of karate: Shotokan Karate, and Kyokushin Karate, Pankration, Savate, Lethwei, Bokator
- Olympic sport: No

Yaw-Yan (from Filipino Sayaw ng Kamatayan, lit. "Dance of Death"), is a Filipino martial art developed by Napoleon A. Fernandez and based on older Filipino martial arts. Since its inception in the 1970s, it has dominated the kickboxing scene in the Philippines and has proven very effective against other stand-up fighting arts.

Yaw-Yan closely resembles Muay Thai, but differs in the hip-torquing motion as well as the downward-cutting nature of its kicks, the arm strikes resembling bolo knife movements, Melvin Manota Fernandez being bolo instruction specialist In Tiwi Albay, and the emphasis on delivering attacks from long range (while Muay Thai focuses more on clinching).

Yaw-yan practitioners participate in various Filipino mixed-martial arts tournaments such as the Universal Reality Combat Championship and Fearless Fighting.

== History ==
The originator of Yaw-Yan is Napoleon A. Fernandez or "Master Nap", a native of Quezon province, who originally studied Jujutsu. The name Yaw-Yan is an abbreviation of sayaw ng kamatayan, literally "dance of death" (derived from the last two syllables).

Fernandez is a martial artist; he reportedly had a background in Jeet Kune Do, Karate, eskrima, aikido, and judo. He is said to have modified all the martial art forms that he studied and fused them to create a martial art form that is deadly to opponents and "advantageous to the build of Filipinos". Yaw Yan was introduced to the public in 1972. It includes elements of striking, takedowns, grappling, stick and knife fighting, and additional kickboxing material.

It reflected the growing popularity of kickboxing during the 1970s to 1980s, and from the 2000s, the popularity of modern mixed martial arts in the Philippines as well as worldwide.

== Training ==
Training in Yaw-Yan utilizes drills from Muay Thai and boxing, with heavy emphasis on leg striking, basic combinations, defenses, body conditioning, and footwork. So, a beginner usually first undergoes basic boxing drills for punching and basic Muay Thai for leg strikes. It is also common for instructors today to incorporate training from grappling focused martial arts, most popularly brazilian jiu-jitsu since mixed martial arts is also a popular combat sport in the Philippines.

The forearm strikes, elbows, punches, dominating palms, and hand movements are empty-hand translations of the bladed weapons. One of the signature strikes of Yaw-Yan are the twelve "bolo punches" (not to be confused with boxing's bolo punch) which are patterned from twelve striking angles of eskrima (specifically, the striking angles from whom Fernandez learned).

== Famous practitioners ==
- Napoleon Fernandez – Founder of Yaw-Yan and was inducted in the 1st Philippine Martial Arts Hall of Fame.
- Alvin Aguilar – Mixed martial artist and founder of the Universal Reality Combat Championship (URCC)
- Ruben Sumido – Muay Thai gold medalist at the 2007 Asian Indoor Games and veteran Yaw-Yan competitor.
- Benigno "Ekin" Caniga Jr. – Founder of the Yaw-Yan ArDigma Cebu and a 3rd Philippine Martial Arts Hall of Famer.
- Henry Kobayashi – Founder of Hybrid Yaw-Yan, an MMA promoter/coach and a 1st Philippine Martial Arts Hall of Famer.
- Rey Yap – Founder of Yaw-Yan Buhawi and MMA coach.
- Rennie Ross – Founder of Yaw-Yan Kampilan, a national team coach/official and a 1st Philippine Martial Arts Hall of Famer.
- Emiliano Zapata – Dubbed by Napoleon Fernandez as the "Pride of Yaw Yan," and a national team coach.
