= Alvin Aguilar =

Filipino martial artist

Arthur Alvin A. Aguilar
- Born: Arthur Alvin A. Aguilar; Bacolod, Philippines
- Other names: Alvin Aguilar
- Nationality: Filipino
- Style: Gracie Jiu-Jitsu, Shotokan, Yaw-Yan, Pekiti-Tirsia Kali, Greco-Roman wrestling
- Teachers: Royce Gracie, Saulo Ribeiro, Rob Cousart
- Rank: 3rd degree black belt in Brazilian Jiu-Jitsu

Other information
- Notable students: Maybelline Masuda
- Website: http://www.alvinaguilar.com

Alvin Aguilar
Medal record

Representing Philippines

Brazilian Jiu-Jitsu

Asian Jiu-Jitsu Championship
Gold medal – first place	2016 Tokyo	-73kg

Arthur Alvin A. Aguilar is a Filipino martial artist and mixed martial arts promoter better known as Alvin Aguilar. He was born on April 28, 1974, in Bacolod, Philippines. He is the president and founder of the Universal Reality Combat Championship (2002–present); He is also the founder and head coach of DEFTAC Ribeiro Jiu-jitsu Philippines (1996–present.) and is currently serving as the president of the Wrestling Association of the Philippines. He started training in martial arts at the age of 9, first in Karate, Arnis and Greco-Roman wrestling. Having spent over 30 years of his life to the study of multiple martial arts forms including Sari-an, Brazilian jiu-jitsu, Yaw-Yan, Pekiti Tirsia Kali, etc., he has developed his own unique fighting style specialized in grappling, knife, and street fighting. He is also known for being the first home-grown Filipino Brazilian jiu-jitsu black belt.

== Biography ==
Alvin Aguilar is only son of Arthur Aguilar and Madeleine Aguilar. Growing up, Alvin was considered by his parents, teachers, and peers as a very hyperactive child. He was very athletic so his parents were forced to keep him immersed in various extra-curricular activities just to keep him busy. At the early age of nine, he began to show much interest in martial arts, an interest that both his parents supported all the way. His father would even drive him around as he explored different gyms and systems. He had an early exposure to Arnis through his father and later on, he learned Shotokan Karate and Greco-Roman Wrestling throughout the 80s.

He earned his college degree in Behavioral Science at De La Salle University Where he went on to become the leader of his fraternity (Tau Gamma Phi). His involvement in fraternity violence rapidly increased and so did his thirst to seek out the most effective forms of combat. He would later join a group called Sari-An, or Sariling Pamamaraan, a martial arts group founded in the 1980s that was geared towards underground street fighting under the tutelage of the system's originator Robert Cousart. He also started training his Sticks and Knife Fighting skills with Sixto Carlos of Carlos Hermanos and with Leo Gaje of Pekiti Tirsia Kali.

Starting his Gracie Jiu-jitsu training at the Gracie Academy in Los Angeles, California in 1993, he became one of three existing certified International training representatives to the Gracie Association, the other two come from Nassau, Bahamas, and Canada. In 2006, he was promoted to black belt by Brazilian Black Belt Kazeka Muniz. In 2009, he became a member of Gracie Humaita under Royler Gracie. He now trains under Saulo Ribeiro of Ribeiro Jiu Jitsu. In May 2010, he was promoted to 1st-degree black belt by Royler Gracie.

== Martial arts career ==
Aguilar is a decorated fighter and grappler. He is a 3-time Undefeated Fighter, Sari-An Annual Sparing Meet, and he won in many underground fights. His first notable accomplishment was winning silver in the 1999 Gracie Jiu-Jitsu Tournament at Detroit Michigan, United States. Four years after earning the title as the first Filipino BJJ black belt in 2006, Aguilar achieved the record for being the first homegrown Filipino BJJ black belt to win a match at the Mundials. In the same year, Aguilar competed in the Philippine Wrestling National Open where he recorded the fastest pin (17 seconds) in Philippine wrestling history. He settled with a silver in the competition. In September 2016, he won gold in Asian Jiu-Jitsu Championship at Tokyo, Japan

== Controversy ==
In his younger days, he was known to roam bars in Manila looking for fights in bars or clubs to test his fighting skills. He has been involved in numerous street fights including a case involving fraternity violence through which he was expelled by the administrators of De La Salle University due to injuries inflicted on a member of a rival fraternity. He filed a lawsuit against the university and the court eventually ruled in his favor.

In 2003, Aguilar was the victim of a drive-by shooting. A gunman opened fire at Emiliano Familar and Aguilar. Familiar was pronounced dead on arrival while Aguilar survived three gunshots from an M16 rifle.

On February 19, 2011, Aguilar choked out a fighter for attacking the referee during the event at his own promotion, URCC Baguio 3: Invasion. This incident remains the only time a promoter took physical action against a competitor, in defense to the referee being attacked by the fighter.

== DEFTAC Pilipinas ==
In the year 1996, Aguilar formed DEFTAC Philippines a Mixed Martial Arts and Brazilian Jiu-Jitsu Team and is known as one of the biggest BJJ academies in the Philippines. Under Aguilar's complete and direct guidance, DEFTAC has trained and produced martial arts champions in BJJ, MMA, Muay Thai, Wrestling and FMA including first Filipino World BJJ Gold Medalist: Maybelline Masuda, National and International MMA and BJJ Champions: Marcus Valda, Richard Lasprilla, Allan Co, Fritz Rodriguez, Louie Sanggalang, Ali Khatibi, Vince Ortiz, Justin Ceriola, Myron Mangubat, and Red Romero.

== B.A.M.F. Mixed Martial Arts Center ==
In October 2008, Aguilar opened an MMA school, the B.A.M.F. Mixed Martial Arts Center. His MMA gym, located in Paranaque, Philippines, offers instruction in Mixed Martial Arts, Brazilian jiu-jitsu, Muay Thai, Wrestling and Boxing. Professional fighters like Royce Gracie, Saulo Ribeiro, and Mauricio "Tinguinha" Mariano have conducted seminars at the center.

== Personal life ==
Alvin has three children with his ex-wife, former URCC marketing director, Bubbles Bermudez. He's currently running his businesses with his partner, BJJ black belt and first Filipina BJJ Worlds (Mundials) Gold Medalist, Maybelline Masuda, with whom he shares a daughter.
