= John Havan =

French writer (1933–2019)

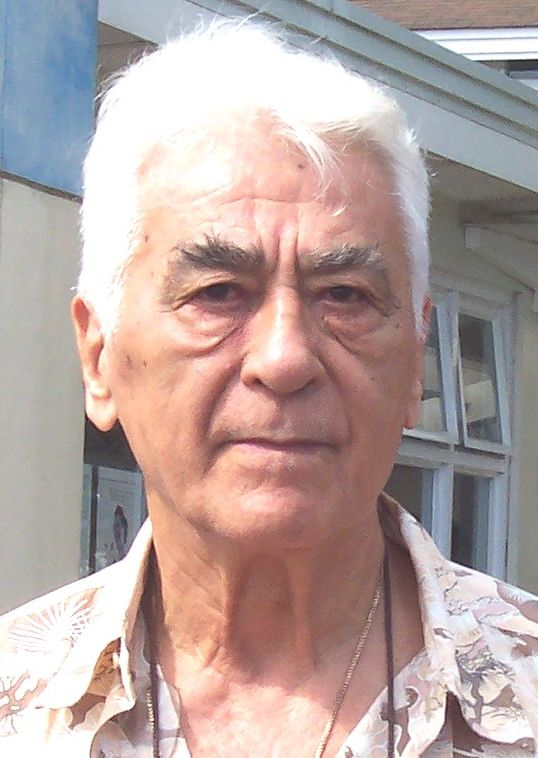
- Born: John Anh Havan; 20 September 1933; Paris, France
- Died: 8 July 2019 (aged 85); Taguig, Philippines
- Education: Oxford University
- Occupation: Writer
- Writing career
- Language: French, Vietnamese, English
- Website: jhavan.com

John Anh Havan (20 September 1933 – 8 July 2019) was a French writer.

== Background ==
John Anh Havan was born in Paris, France, on 20 September 1933. His Vietnamese father, a Sorbonne graduate in law, became Finance Minister under the administration of South Vietnamese President Ngo Dinh Diem. His British mother, enrolled at the London School of Art, eventually became a painter who used Chinese calligraphy as a base for her brush-and-ink drawings of Vietnamese scenes. At home, the family spoke French.

He was educated in England, won a scholarship to St. Peter's Hall, Oxford, where he read Jurisprudence for two years. From 1955 to 1972, he worked with American and European firms in the Asia-Pacific region in the fields of defense contracting, in particular spending the Vietnam War years, working for U.S. firms in South Vietnam. In 1956 he volunteered for two years' service in the Army of the Republic of Vietnam (ARVN) infantry, where he reached the rank of captain. During that period, he became fluent in his father's native language, Vietnamese. The ability to speak, read and write English, French and Vietnamese at a time when the French military was pulling out of Vietnam, the American military was becoming directly involved in that Southeast Asian conflict, and the French-trained Army of the Republic of Vietnam (ARVN) had to be re-trained in the American doctrines of war led to Havan being placed in situations where he had contact with some of the principal actors involved and was able to appreciate their distinctively different mindsets.

After the fall of Saigon in 1975, Havan worked in defense sales as the Southeast Asia consultant for the Office General de l'Air (OGA), a branch of the French Defense Ministry that focused on the promotion of French military equipment. In 1988, he became a Regional Manager, SEA, for Plessey PLC (UK) – radars – and later G.E. (US) – aircraft engines. In 2000 he retired from defense sales and settled down to writing.

Havan died on 8 July 2019, at the age of 85.

== Education ==
- 1946 – Secondary education: Hilsea College, Oakley Hall, Basingstoke, Hampshire, UK.
- 1954 – Tertiary education: scholarship student to St. Peter's Hall, Oxford University, UK (Jurisprudence).

== Martial arts ==
Attendance at boarding schools in London as a French-born teenager taught Havan the importance of standing up for himself. He initially took up boxing, earning a Boxing Blue as a lightweight at St. Peter's Hall, Oxford in 1954. After attending a demonstration in 1953 at the Albert Hall in London by a visiting 6th dan from the Kodokan in Tokyo, he had begun Judo training. Beginning in 1958, he was employed by American defense contractors in Vietnam. He continued his martial arts training during his 17 years in Vietnam, taught martial arts to U.S. Marines, and worked with an elite Korean Army infantry division. He earned his Judo 3rd dan in 1962 with a kataju-jime (half-cross) strangling technique over a heavyweight American from Guam Naval Base.

Havan began Aikido training in Vietnam in 1963, receiving his 2nd dan belt in Saigon in 1967. He eventually practiced and taught Aikido for over 25 years. He took up Taekwondo while in Vietnam, earning his 3rd dan in 1971 after teaching the art nightly to US Marines in Danang for three years. After leaving Vietnam in 1972, Havan continued his Aikido training at the Hombu dojo in Tokyo, the headquarters of the Aikikai.

In 1981, Havan founded what is now known as the Shinbu Dojo Aikido Club of the Philippines. He founded another group now known as the Makati Aikido Club in 1983, and worked to bring these two clubs into the orbit of Aikikai. Since 1983, Aikidoka from both clubs have been taking Tokyo-sanctioned exams before Japanese masters sent by Aikikai. He was a driving force behind the creation of the now-defunct Aikido Association of the Philippines. In 1985, Havan was posted in Thailand and returned at age 52 to regular training in Muay Thai. He had first trained in this sport at different times in the late 1970s and early 1980s, and continued Muay Thai training in Thailand until 1994.

In 1985, after a work related relocation to Thailand and following on previous training at different times in the 1970s, Havan returned to regular training in Muay Thai.

== Self defense ==
By 1990 Havan had concluded that his 40 years of training and experience with several martial arts had not prepared him to deal with a determined attack outside of the tightly regulated combat sport environment. Following on this, he developed a simplified self-defense system, a technique for surviving a real life attack rather than a formal martial art, which he called Counterstrike. He has successfully taught the system in Thailand, Vietnam, France, China, Singapore, Indonesia, and the Philippines. The system was later renamed kick-poke-chop, or KPC, after its three basic strikes.

== Writing ==
In 1999, Havan retired to the Philippines and began work on writing.

Mandarin, Havan's first novel, was released in 2008. It covers the seventy years from 1883 to 1954, which saw the death of French colonialism in the First Indochina War and the birth of communism in Vietnam. The book follows Bach, the Mandarin of the title, whose life mirrors these cataclysmic changes as he grows from a boy in a rich and influential Court family in feudal Vietnam, as an embattled Mandarin struggling with the political and social realities of life under the Japanese occupation, and finally as an old man who looks back on life after surviving a Viet Minh death sentence by the Viet Minh who labeled him a blood-sucking landlord and oppressor of the people.

The Tiger General, Havan's second novel, was released in 2011. Its main character is Hai, one of Bach's many illegitimate children, who was born from a casual affair with a village girl. Mother and son run away from the manor in Thanh Hóa province and end up as vagrants under a bridge in Ha Noi. Before dying of tuberculosis, she tells Hai that he was cursed at birth by three bad stars and has to survive thirty-six years before his lucky star can rise. Buffeted by two World Wars and the Japanese occupation, Hai goes from being a beggar and a pickpocket to a member of the communist underground resistance to a French police informer to a Japanese police analyst to a French intelligence agent. At thirty-six years of age, Hai comes into his own, as his mother predicted, and his rise is unstoppable. Recruited by the CIA, decorated by his president as a police general, Hai cuts a wide swath through his enemies after the Tet Offensive as the Tiger General, ending his career as a senior political consultant at the US State Department, working to bring freedom back to his people.

A third planned book, Kaleidoscope of War, was scheduled for release in 2015. It is planned to be a collage of short stories as seen from the ground by men who fought in the Second Vietnam War from 1955 to 1975.

=== Bibliography ===
- Havan, John (2006). Self Defense. Booklore Publishing Corp. ISBN 971-817-111-8.
- Havan, John (2008). Mandarin: A Novel of Viet Nam. Orchid Press. ISBN 978-974-524-100-8.
- Havan, John (2011). The Tiger General. Orchid Press. ISBN 978-9745241350.
- Havan, John (2012). Counterstrike – a 3-second street survival system. Booklore Publishing Corp. ISBN 978-971-817-179-0.
