= Amado Benito Jr. =

Filipino martial artist

Amado Benito, Jr.
- Born: Philippines
- Other names: Benito; Jojo; Junior
- Education: University of the Cordilleras
- Known for: Wushu Martial Arts, Mixed Martial Arts

Amado Benito Jr. (born 1992) is a Filipino amateur wushu fighter. He competed and medaled in the citywide, regional, national and international wushu competitions. He represented his university, the City of Baguio and the Philippines.

He was a former team member of Team Lakay Wushu – UC Chapter, a former team member of Team Baguio, and a former team member of Team Philippines.

He started wushu martial arts training and competed in a mixed martial arts competitions when he was in high school. He sparred with peers constantly and developed increasingly. His recent lost in the semi-finals of the recently concluded 8th Wushu Championships in Vietnam spurred him to contemplate on adding a wrestling or judo training regimen.

In April 2013, he immigrated to the United States and lived in Anchorage, Alaska.

== Amateur career ==
=== Philippine National Games ===
In April 2008, at the Mall of Asia in Pasay, he participated in his first national championships and took his first silver medal. This was his first platform to one of his numerous overseas competition. He was sent, as a 16-year-old, to represent Team Philippines in Bali, Indonesia.

In May 2009, he won his first gold medal at the Rizal Memorial Sports Complex in Manila, the venue of 2nd National Wushu Championships. This was his gateway to Macau, China international competition as a 17-year-old.

In August 2010, in Manila, he represented again his City of Baguio in the National Wushu Championships – his third. This competition was held at the Rizal Memorial Sports Complex. At the conclusion of the event, another silver medal was placed on his neck as his souvenir. This was his ticket to Singapore Wushu competition as an 18-year-old.

In June 2011, in Bacolod, in his 4th National Games, he mined his third silver medal fighting in the 52 kg division at the Negros Occidental Multipurpose Center. He was 19 years old.

In June 2012, in Dumaguete, he was part of the powerhouse team of Baguio that won the overall championship. In this same competition, he garnered his second gold medal in his 5th National Competition, popularly known as Philippine National Games. Due to this achievement, leaders and representatives of Wushu National Team booked his ticket to the scheduled Asian Wushu Championships – for Seniors – to be held from 19 to 26 August in Vietnam.

=== International Competitions ===
In December 2008, in Bali, Indonesia, he was a team member of Team Philippines in his first international fight at the 2nd World Junior Wushu Championships but did not medal.

In June 2009, in Macau, China, the Philippine flag was on his chest while competing in his 2nd international fight at the 5th Asian Junior Wushu Championships but did not medal.

In December 2010, in Singapore, in the successfully concluded 3rd World Junior Wushu Championships – sanctioned by the International Wushu Federation, he finally had a podium finish and received his first Bronze Medal in international competition by thrashing Kant Shashi in the 48 kg division. In this competition, the Philippine Sports Commission, in compliance of Resolution No. 574-2011, officially released a check in his name an amount of 15,586.00 pesos on 25 August 2011 to pay for his incurred injury.

In August 2012, he was a semi-finalist. In the semi-final fight, he fought a Chinese athlete at the 8th Asian Wushu Championship in Vietnam and lost. But he received his first bronze medal in his first competition at the Seniors Division by defeating the other loser of the other semi-final fight. The event was held at Ho Chi Minh City at the Phu Tho Indoor Stadium.

== Professional career ==
In the 9th Grappler Cup held at the University of the Cordilleras, Junior took the silver medal. The competition was in the 51–57 kg weight division.
