= Bea Roble =

Personal information
- Full name: Beariza Ma. Josephine Roble
- Nationality: Philippines
- Born: October 8, 1991 (age 34)

Sport
- Sport: Swimming
- Strokes: Freestyle
- Classifications: S6, SB6, SM6

Bea Riza Maria Josephine Roble (born October 8, 1991) is a Filipino swimmer who competed in the 2012 Summer Paralympics in London.

Roble acquired osteoporosis when she was nine years old following a hip surgery with her doctors recommending her to take up swimming for therapy reasons. She later focused more on the sport and competed at the dwarfism and orthopedically handicapped paraswimming division. She then went on to compete for the Philippines in international tournaments such as the ASEAN Para Games. In the 2011 edition she garnered a gold, and two silver medals.

Roble qualified for the 2012 Summer Paralympics in London through a qualifier event held in Italy.
