= Juan Miguel Torres =

Olympic sailor from the Philippines

Personal information
- Nationality: Philippines
- Born: 26 February 1968 (age 57)

Sport

Sailing career
- Class: Soling
- Updated on 29 February 2020

Juan Miguel Torres (born: 26 February 1968) is a sailor from the Philippines. who represented his country at the 1992 Summer Olympics in Barcelona, Spain as crew member in the Soling. With helmsman Mario Almario and fellow crew member Teodorico Asejo they took the 24th place.
