= Mary Ellyn Caasi =

Filipino basketball player

Personal information
- Born: 1973 or 1974 (age 51–52)
- Listed height: 5 ft 11 in (1.80 m)
- Listed weight: 200 lb (91 kg)
- Position: Center
Medals
Women's basketball
Representing the Philippines
SEABA Championship
| Silver medal – second place | 1997 Bangkok | Team |

Mary Ellyn Caasi is a Filipino basketball player who played at center position for the Philippines women's national basketball team. She stood 5'11 ft tall and weighed 200 pounds. Caasi is a native of Alaminos, Pangasinan.

== Education ==
Caasi studied criminology at the University of Manila.

== Basketball career ==
Caasi played for the Dagupan-based Luzon Colleges. While playing for Luzon, she was scouted by Nic Jorge, secretary general of the Basketball Association of the Philippines, to play for the national team.

She was part of the squad that participated at the 1997 SEABA Championship for Women. The team defeated Malaysia, 58-53 where Caasi scored 15 points. However, she was fouled-out during the controversial final game against eventual champions, Thailand due to questionable referee calls. The said game ended in a 66–90 defeat.

By 2005, Caasi has participated in three Southeast Asian Games.
