= Alfonso Qua =

Filipino sailor

Personal information
- Full name: Alfonso Qua
- Nationality: Filipino
- Born: c. 1932

Sailing career
- Sport: Sailing
- Class: Soling

Alfonso Maria Qua is a sailor from Philippines. Qua represented his country at the 1972 Summer Olympics in Kiel. Qua took 26th place in the Soling with Mario Almario as helmsman and Ambrosio Santos as fellow crew member.
