= Maria Angelica Ayala =

Filipina dressage rider

Personal information
- Full name: Maria Angelica Ayala
- Nationality: Philippines
- Discipline: Dressage
- Born: August 6, 1964 (age 60)
- Height: 5 ft 7.7 in (1.72 m)
- Weight: 112.43 lb (51.00 kg; 8 st 0.43 lb)
- Horse(s): Saigon; Lazarro 9
Medal record
Equestrian
Representing Philippines
2013 FEI World Dressage Challenge
Gold medal – first place	2013 - Zone 9	Medium

Maria Angelica Ayala, also known as Ina Ayala, is a Filipina dressage rider. Her best result was at the 2013 FEI World Dressage Challenge when she finish first at the medium category of Zone 9, with her horse Saigon. She also finished fourth at the advance category at the same tournament.
