= Teodorico Asejo =

Olympic sailor from the Philippines

Personal information
- Nationality: Filipino
- Born: May 21, 1964 (age 61)

Sport

Sailing career
- Class: Soling
- Updated on February 29, 2020

Teodorico Asejo (born May 21, 1964) is a Filipino sailor who competed at the 1992 Summer Olympics in Barcelona, Spain as crew member in the Soling. With helmsman Mario Almario and fellow crew member Juan Miguel Torres they took the 24th place.
