= Ambrosio Santos =

Filipino sailor

Personal information
- Full name: Ambrosio J. N. Santos
- Nationality: Filipino

Sailing career
- Sport: Sailing
- Class: Soling

Ambrosio J. N. Santos is a sailor from Philippines. Qua represented his country at the 1972 Summer Olympics in Kiel. He took 26th place in the Soling with Mario Almario as helmsman and Alfonso Qua as fellow crew member.
