= Joseph Sánchez (chess player) =

Filipino chess grandmaster (born 1970)

Personal information
- Born: August 19, 1970 (age 55) Cebu City, Philippines

Chess career
- Country: Philippines
- Title: Grandmaster (2009)
- FIDE rating: 2471 (July 2026)
- Peak rating: 2544 (September 2011)

Joseph Sánchez (born August 19, 1970) is a Filipino chess grandmaster of Cebuano descent. He became a grandmaster in 2009 after gaining 6.5 points in the 23rd Cannes International Chess Festival. Becoming the first Cebuano chess grandmaster and the 11th Filipino chess grandmaster. He reportedly began playing chess at the age of 13. Throughout his career he has represented the Philippines and the team placed fourth at the Asian Team Chess Championships in Shenyang. He also jointly won a Round-robin tournament in Milan. On September 1, 2003, his national ranking peaked being the third highest rated Filipino with an Elo of 2544 behind Wesley So and Rogelio Antonio. Jr.
