= Arturo Romeo =

Filipino cyclist (born 1941)

Personal information
- Born: October 20, 1941 (age 84)
- Height: 168 cm (5 ft 6 in)
- Weight: 57 kg (126 lb)

Cycling career
- Sport: Cycling

Arturo M. Romeo (born October 20, 1941) is a Filipino former cyclist. He competed in the individual road race and team time trial events at the 1964 Summer Olympics.
