= Norberto Arceo =

Filipino cyclist

Personal information
- Born: August 28, 1943 (age 83)

Cycling career
- Sport: Cycling

Norberto J. Arceo (born August 28, 1943) is a former Filipino cyclist. He competed in the individual road race and team time trial events at the 1964 Summer Olympics.
