= Batangas Racing Circuit =

Motorsport circuit in Batangas, Philippines

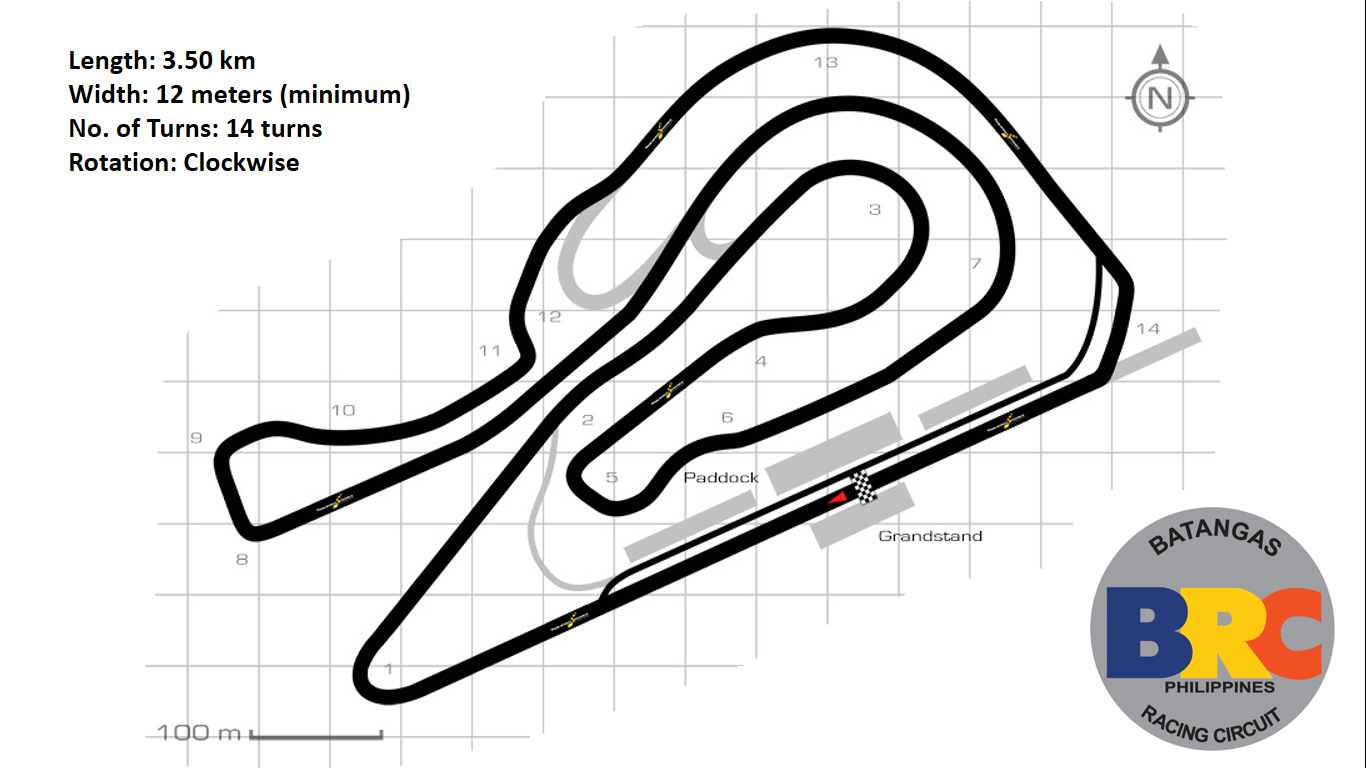
- Full Circuit (2005–present)
- Location: Rosario, Batangas, Philippines
- Coordinates: 13°49′13″N 121°16′38″E
- Opened: 16 October 1996; 29 years ago
- Major events: Asian F3 Series (2003–2005, 2008); Asia Road Racing Championship (1996)
- Website: https://www.batangasracingcircuit.com

Full Circuit (2005–present)
- Length: 3.500 km (2.175 mi)
- Turns: 20
- Race lap record: 1:27.546 ( (Republic of Ireland) John O'Hara, Dallara F301, 2005, F3)

Short Circuit (2005–present)
- Length: 3.006 km (1.868 mi)
- Turns: 13

Full Circuit (2002–2004)
- Length: 3.400 km (2.113 mi)
- Turns: 20
- Race lap record: 1:24.835 ( (Australia) Christian Jones, Dallara F301, 2004, F3)

Original Circuit (1996–2004)
- Length: 2.900 km (1.802 mi)
- Turns: 12

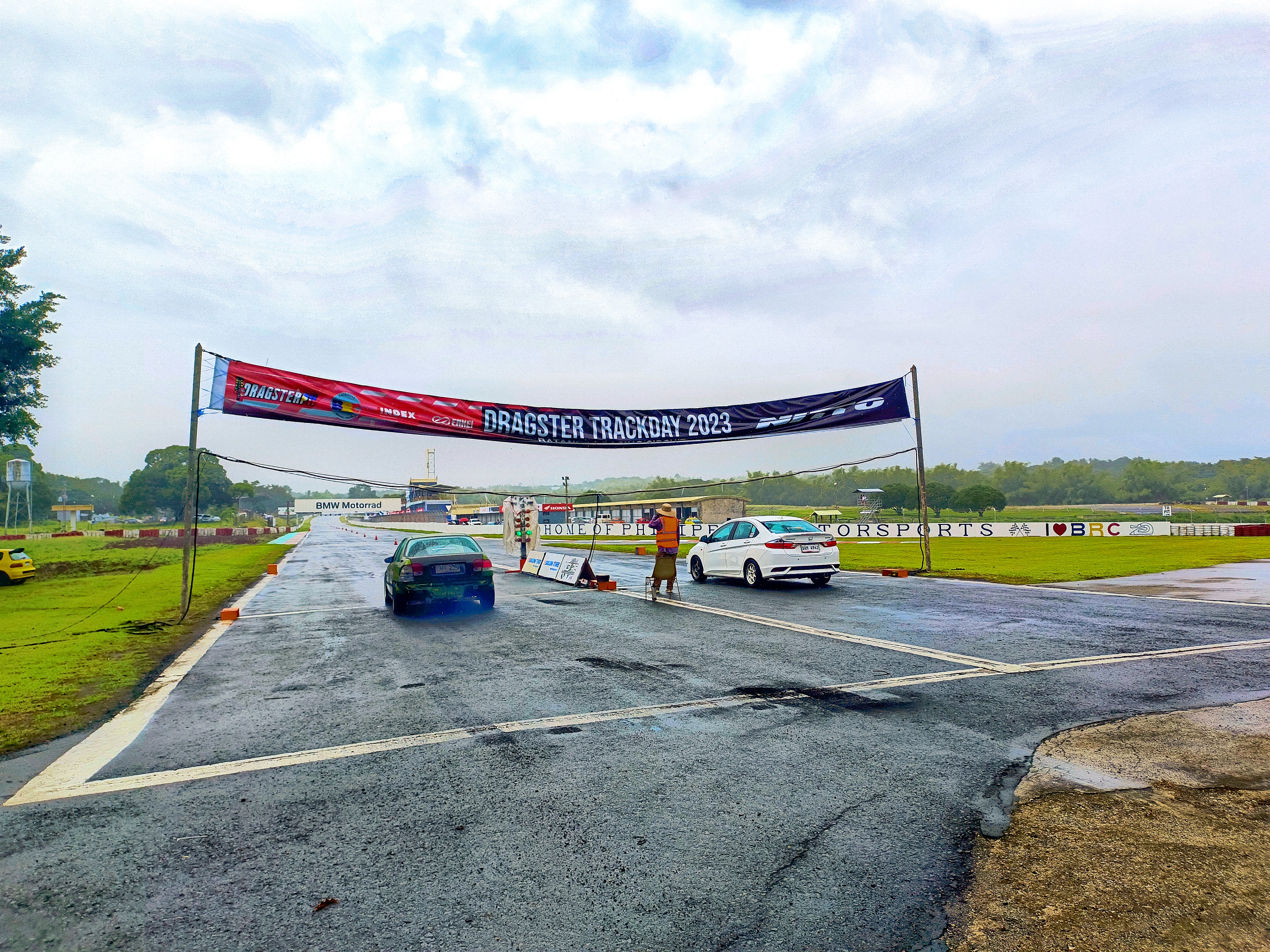
Drag event at BRC

Batangas Racing Circuit is a motorsports circuit in Barrio Maligaya, Rosario, Batangas, Philippines built on October 16, 1996. The circuit is 3.500 km (2.175 mi) long, has 20 turns, and runs in a clockwise direction.

It hosts 2- and 4-wheeled races such as Formula Toyota, Toyota Corolla Cup, National Touring Car Championship, Circuit Showdown, FlatOut Race Series, Philippine GT, and the Philippine Superbike Championship. The layout also features a drag strip that is used by the National Drag Racing Championship.

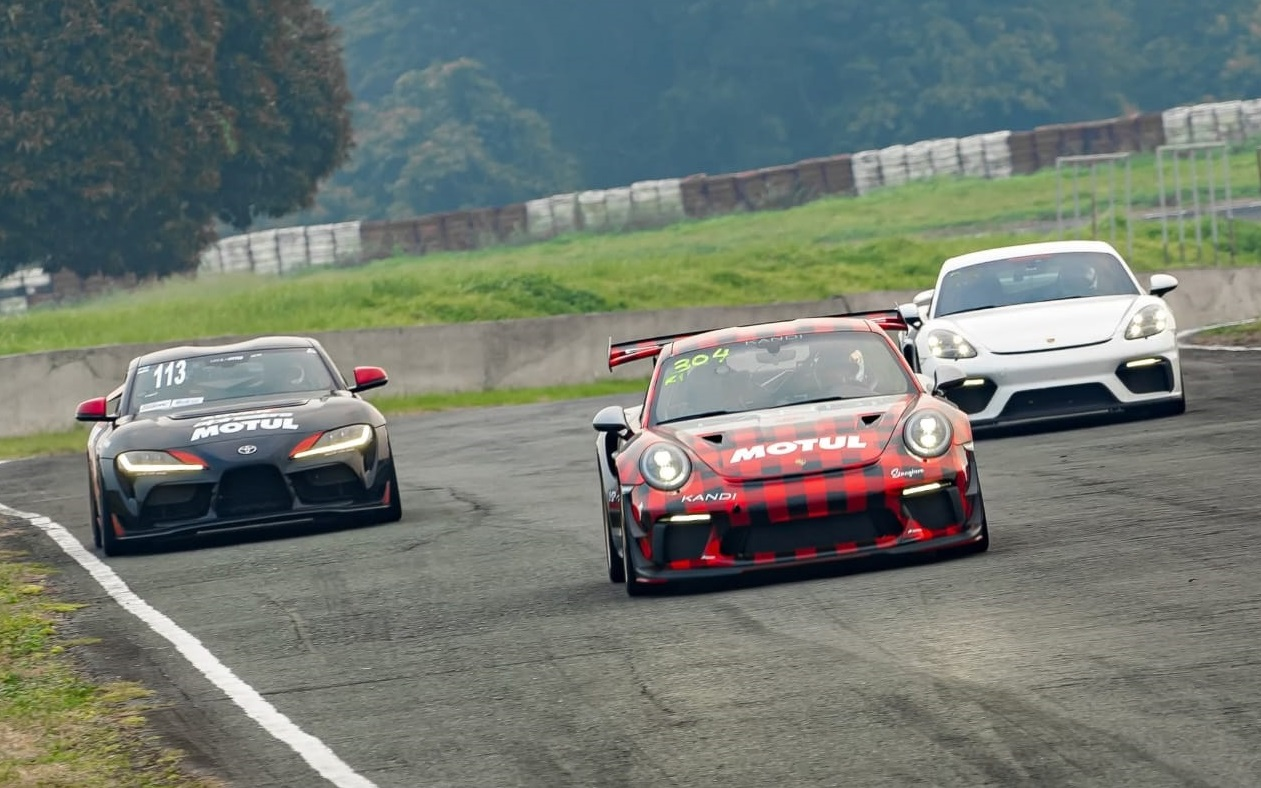
Multiple Sportscars racing around the track.

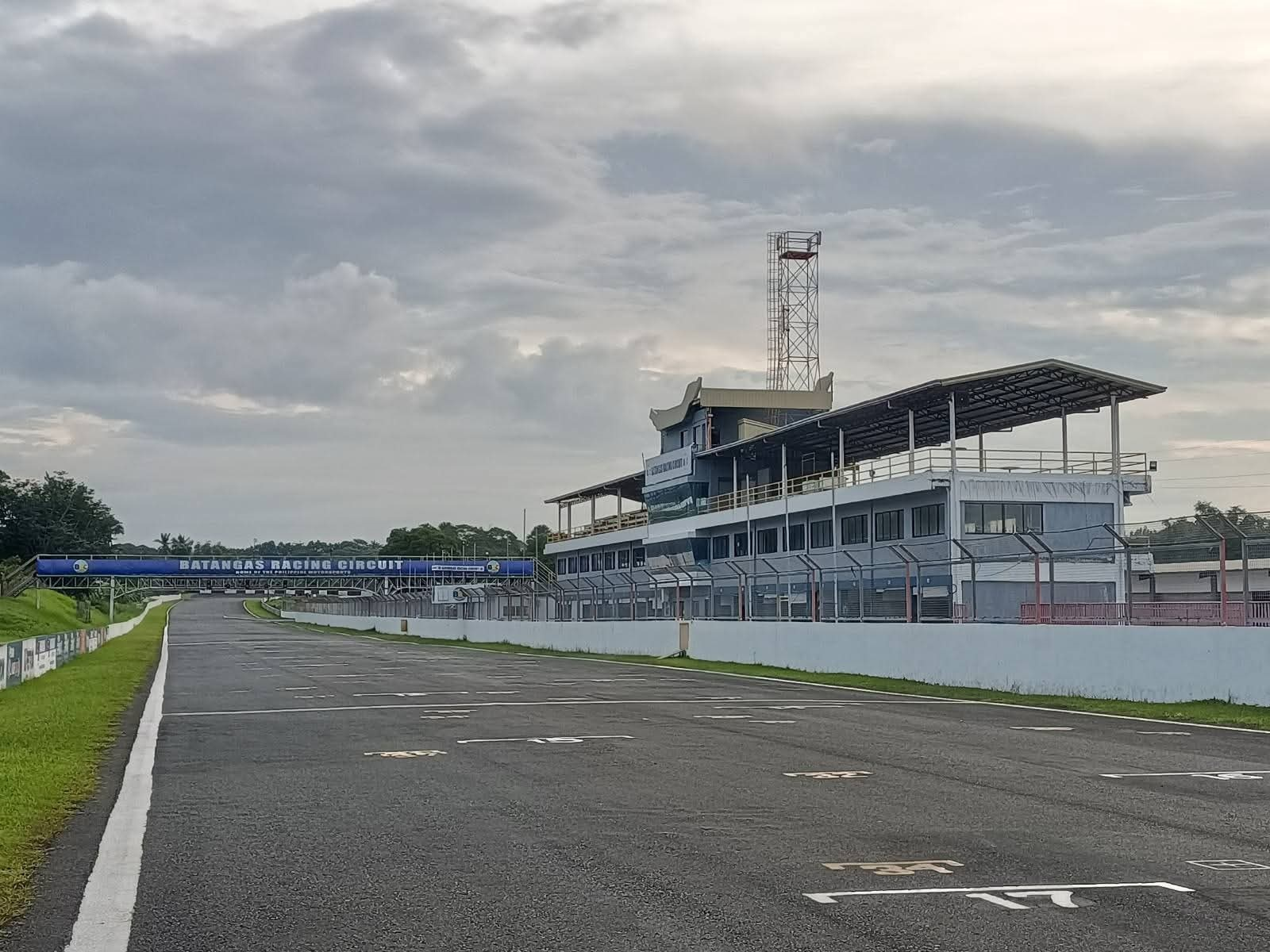
Batangas Racing CIrcuit Starting Line
