= Daniel Olivares (cyclist) =

Filipino cyclist

Personal information
- Born: July 2, 1940 (age 86)
- Height: 165 cm (5 ft 5 in)
- Weight: 57 kg (126 lb)

Cycling career
- Sport: Cycling

Daniel A. Olivares (born July 2, 1940) is a Filipino former cyclist. He competed in the individual road race and team time trial events at the 1964 Summer Olympics.
