= Demetrio Pastrana =

Filipino gymnast

- Full name: Demetrio F. Pastrana
- Born: September 4, 1941 (age 85)
- Height: 152 cm (5 ft 0 in)

Gymnastics career
- Discipline: Men's artistic gymnastics
- Country represented: Philippines

Demetrio F. Pastrana (born September 4, 1941) is a Filipino gymnast. He competed in three events at the 1964 Summer Olympics.
