= Maria-Luisa Floro =

Filipino gymnast (born 1944)

Personal information
- Nationality: Filipino
- Born: June 7, 1944 (age 81)
- Height: 5 ft 1 in (156 cm)

Sport
- Sport: Gymnastics

Maria-Luisa G. Floro (born June 7, 1944) is a Filipino gymnast. She competed in at the 1964 Summer Olympics alongside Evelyn Magluyan. She is inducted in the Far Eastern University's Sports Hall of Fame.
