= Philippines at the 1983 SEA Games =

Philippines at the 1983 Southeast Asian Games
- IOC code: PHI
- NOC: Philippine Olympic Committee
- Website: www.olympic.ph (in English)

in Singapore
- Medals Ranked 2nd: Gold 49 Silver 48 Bronze 54 Total 151

Southeast Asian Games appearances (overview)
- 1977; 1979; 1981; 1983; 1985; 1987; 1989; 1991; 1993; 1995; 1997; 1999; 2001; 2003; 2005; 2007; 2009; 2011; 2013; 2015; 2017; 2019; 2021; 2023; 2025; 2027; 2029

The Philippines participated at the 12th Southeast Asian Games held in Singapore from May 28 to June 6, 1983.

== SEA Games performance ==
The country finished second overall behind Indonesia which became a cause for national celebration. President Marcos personally congratulated the athletes at Malacanang as he expressed the sentiments of the entire Filipino nation for a job well done.

It was in two sports, athletics and boxing, which the Philippines stampled their class in the Singapore SEAG that gave other competing nations a view of the Philippines' resurgence in sports. The Filipinos emerged as the overall champions in track and field. In Boxing, Efren Tabanas (flyweight), Raymundo Suico (light-middleweight), Leopoldo Cantancio (featherweight) and Nelson Jamili (pinweight) gave the country a four gold medals. Swimming came next behind athletics with the most number of medals produced with 10, four of them from American trained swimming marvel Billy Wilson. Christine Jacob accounted for two more, while the ageless Jairulla Jaitulla romped away with two golds to underscore the Filipino tankers' fruitful bid.

Weightlifting was highlighted by a sweep of Jaime Sebastian in the super-super heavyweight division as he confirmed his reputation as the strongest man in Southeast Asia. The Philippine men's basketball team, mentored by Larry Albano, swept the tournament, including a 72–66 victory over arch rival Malaysia, to retain the championship. Their female counterparts finished second anew to defending title holder Malaysia.

In some of the country's stinging setbacks, the most humiliating was the defeat of Lydia de Vega, Asia's sprint queen, to Thailand's Wallapa Pinij in the 100 meters. De Vega, however, returned to win her next duel with Pinij in the 200 meter event. Another heartbreaker was the defeat of the defending champion women's volleyball team at the hands of a well-prepared Indonesian sextet. Badminton, Sepak Takraw and Table Tennis went home empty-handed.

== Medalists ==
=== Gold ===
No.	Medal	Name	Sport	Event
1	Gold	Cherrie Valera	Archery	Women's 60m recurve
2	Gold	Cherrie Valera	Archery	Women's 30m recurve
3	Gold	Isidro del Prado	Athletics	Men's 400m
4	Gold	Leonardo Illut	Athletics	Men's 10,000m
5	Gold	Renato Unso	Athletics	Men's 400m hurdles
6	Gold	Hector Begeo	Athletics	Men's 3000m Steeplechase
7	Gold	Chamberlaine Gonzales	Athletics	Men's pole vault
8	Gold	Agustin Jarina	Athletics	Men's hammer throw
9	Gold	Lydia de Vega	Athletics	Women's 200m
10	Gold	Lucena Alam	Athletics	Women's 800m
11	Gold	Agrippina de la Cruz	Athletics	Women's 100m hurdles
12	Gold	Agrippina de la Cruz	Athletics	Women's 400m hurdles
13	Gold	Elma Muros	Athletics	Women's long jump
14	Gold	Philippines	Basketball	Men's team
15	Gold	Bec Watanabe	Bowling	Women's masters
16	Gold	Bong Coo	Bowling	Women's All Events
17	Gold	Philippines	Bowling	Three-Woman
18	Gold	Philippines	Bowling	Women's Quintet
19	Gold	Nelson Jamili	Boxing	Pinweight
20	Gold	Efren Tabanas	Boxing	Flyweight
21	Gold	Leopoldo Cantancio	Boxing	Featherweight
22	Gold	Raymond Suico	Boxing	Light Middleweight
23	Gold	Maria Teresa Padre	Judo	Women's 61kg
24	Gold	Eleen Tinio	Judo	Women's Above 72kg
25	Gold	Policarpio Ortega	Sailing	Boardsailing Windglider
26	Gold	Margarita Villareal	Sailing	Women's Water Skiing Individual
27	Gold	Margarita Villareal	Sailing	Women's Water Skiing Jumpsl
28	Gold	Margarita Villareal	Sailing	Women's Water Skiing Slalom
29	Gold	Nathaniel Padilla	Shooting	Men's 25m Rapid Fire Pistol
30	Gold	Manuel Versoza Valdes	Shooting	Men's individual Trap
31	Gold	William Wilson	Swimming	Men's 200m freestyle
32	Gold	William Wilson	Swimming	Men's 400m freestyle
33	Gold	Joselito Andaya	Swimming	Men's 1500m freestyle
34	Gold	Jairulla Jaitulla	Swimming	Men's 100m breaststroke
35	Gold	Francisco Guanco	Swimming	Men's 200m breaststroke
36	Gold	William Wilson	Swimming	Men's 200m butterfly
37	Gold	William Wilson	Swimming	Men's 400m individual medley
38	Gold	Christine Jacob	Swimming	Women's 100m backstroke
39	Gold	Christine Jacob	Swimming	Women's 200m backstroke
40	Gold	Manuel Valleramos	Tennis	Men's singles
41	Gold	Gregorio Colonia	Weightlifting	Men's 52kg Clean & Jerk
42	Gold	Gregorio Colonia	Weightlifting	Men's 52kg Overall
43	Gold	Ramon Solis	Weightlifting	Men's 82.5kg Clean & Jerk
44	Gold	Ramon Solis	Weightlifting	Men's 82.5kg Overall
45	Gold	Rogelio Alinbulio	Weightlifting	Men's 110kg Clean & Jerk
46	Gold	Rogelio Alinbulio	Weightlifting	Men's 110kg Overall
47	Gold	Jaime Sebastian	Weightlifting	Men's Over 110kg Snatch
48	Gold	Jaime Sebastian	Weightlifting	Men's Over 110kg Clean & Jerk
49	Gold	Jaime Sebastian	Weightlifting	Men's Over 110kg Overall

=== Silver ===
No.	Medal	Name	Sport	Event
1	Silver	Jimmy Dela Torre	Athletics	Men's Marathon
2	Silver	Renato Unso	Athletics	Men's 110m hurdles
3	Silver	Jaime Grafilo	Athletics	Men's 400m hurdles
4	Silver	Felicito Descutido	Athletics	Men's triple jump
5	Silver	Inocencio Maquiling	Athletics	Men's javelin throw
6	Silver	Lydia de Vega	Athletics	Women's 100m
7	Silver	Susana Arangote	Athletics	Women's 400m hurdles
8	Silver	Philippines	Athletics	Women's 4 × 400 m Relay
9	Silver	Consuelo Lacusong	Athletics	Women's shot put
10	Silver	Erlinda Lavandia	Athletics	Women's javelin throw
11	Silver	Nene Gamo	Athletics	Women's Heptathlon
12	Silver	Philippines	Basketball	Women's team
13	Silver	Paeng Nepomuceno	Bowling	Men's Single 6 Games
14	Silver	Raul Reformado	Bowling	Men's singles
15	Silver	Paeng Nepomuceno	Bowling	Men's All Events
16	Silver	Raul Reformado; Ortega San Jose	Bowling	Men's doubles
17	Silver	Philippines	Bowling	Three-Man
18	Silver	Philippines	Bowling	Five-men
19	Silver	Philippines	Bowling	Men's Trio
20	Silver	Bong Coo	Bowling	Women's Single 6 Games
21	Silver	Bong Coo	Bowling	Women's masters
22	Silver	Philippines	Bowling	Five-Woman
23	Silver	Philippines	Bowling	Women's Trio
24	Silver	Andres Macion	Judo	Men's 71kg
25	Silver	Eleen Tinio	Judo	Women's Open
26	Silver	Jaime Legarda	Sailing	Men's Water Skiing Individual
27	Silver	Jaime Legarda	Sailing	Men's Water Skiing Jumps
28	Silver	Philippines	Sailing	Mixed Team
29	Silver	Nathaniel Padilla	Shooting	Men's Centre Fire Pistol
30	Silver	Philippines	Shooting	Men's team Centre Fire Pistol
31	Silver	Nathaniel Padilla	Shooting	Men's 25m Standard Pistol
32	Silver	Bartholomew Teyab	Shooting	Men's 50m Standard Pistol
33	Silver	Philippines	Shooting	Men's team Standard Pistol
34	Silver	Philippines	Shooting	Men's team Rapid Fire Pistol
35	Silver	Philippines	Shooting	Men's team Trap
36	Silver	Arminda Vallejo	Shooting	Women's Air Rifle
37	Silver	Philippines	Shooting	Women's team Air Rifle
38	Silver	Francisco Guanco	Swimming	Men's 100m breaststroke
39	Silver	Jairulla Jaitulla	Swimming	Men's 400m individual medley
40	Silver	Philippines	Swimming	Men's 4 × 200 m freestyle relay
41	Silver	Philippines	Swimming	Women's 4 × 100 m freestyle relay
42	Silver	Rudolf Gabriel; Alexander Marcial; Manuel Tolentino; Manuel Valleramos	Tennis	Men's team
43	Silver	Philippines	Volleyball	Women's team
44	Silver	Samuel Alegada	Weightlifting	Men's 56kg Snatch
45	Silver	Edmund Cardano	Weightlifting	Men's 67.5kg Snatch
46	Silver	Renato Dio	Weightlifting	Men's 75kg Clean & Jerk
47	Silver	Renato Dio	Weightlifting	Men's 75kg Overall
48	Silver	Ramon Solis	Weightlifting	Men's 82.5kg Snatch

=== Bronze ===
No.	Medal	Name	Sport	Event
1	Bronze	Cherrie Valera; Carla Cabrera; Ludivina Jamlan	Archery	Women's team
2	Bronze	Nestor Trampe	Athletics	Men's 1500m
3	Bronze	David Carmelo	Athletics	Men's 5000m
4	Bronze	Dario De Rosas	Athletics	Men's pole vault
5	Bronze	Artnell Icocanoo	Athletics	Men's high jump
6	Bronze	Susano Erang	Athletics	Men's shot put
7	Bronze	Andry Rosale	Athletics	Men's Decathlon
8	Bronze	Margarita Tagun	Athletics	Women's 1500m
9	Bronze	Philippines	Athletics	Women's 4 × 100 m Relay
10	Bronze	Dorie Cortejo	Athletics	Women's discus throw
11	Bronze	Billy Silanga	Athletics	Women's javelin throw
12	Bronze	Paeng Nepomuceno	Bowling	Men's masters
13	Bronze	Arianne Cerdeña	Bowling	Women's masters
14	Bronze	Bong Coo; Rita Dela Rosa	Bowling	Women's doubles
15	Bronze	Philippines	Bowling	Three-Woman
16	Bronze	Philippines	Bowling	Women's Trio
17	Bronze	Leopoldo Serantes	Boxing	Light Flyweight
18	Bronze	Patticio Gnapi	Boxing	Light Welterweight
19	Bronze	Oscar Bautista	Judo	Men's Below 78kg
20	Bronze	Rolan Llamas	Judo	Men's Below 86kg
21	Bronze	Dina Panganiban	Judo	Women's 48kg
22	Bronze	Agnes Vallejo	Judo	Women's Below 56kg
23	Bronze	Vicente Herrera; Vivian Velasco	Sailing	Yachting Hobbie 16
24	Bronze	Philippines	Sailing	Yachting Maxi Laser
25	Bronze	Prospero Olivas	Sailing	Men's Water Skiing Individual
26	Bronze	Prospero Olivas	Sailing	Men's Water Skiing Jumps
27	Bronze	Jaime Legarda	Sailing	Men's Water Skiing Slalom
28	Bronze	Leobeth Ylaya	Sailing	Women's Water Skiing Slalom
29	Bronze	Danilo Flores	Shooting	Men's 10m Air Rifle
30	Bronze	Philippines	Shooting	Men's team Air Rifle
31	Bronze	Art Macapagal	Shooting	Men's 10m air pistol
32	Bronze	Philippines	Shooting	Men's team Air Pistol
33	Bronze	Philippines	Shooting	Men's team Small Bore
34	Bronze	Joselito Andaya	Swimming	Men's 400m freestyle
35	Bronze	William Wilson	Swimming	Men's 1500m freestyle
36	Bronze	Judy Jaoud	Swimming	Men's 100m backstroke
37	Bronze	Judy Jaoud	Swimming	Men's 200m backstroke
38	Bronze	Rene Concepcion	Swimming	Men's 200m breaststroke
39	Bronze	Renato Padronia	Swimming	Men's 200m butterfly
40	Bronze	Philippines	Swimming	Men's 4 × 100 m freestyle relay
41	Bronze	Philippines	Swimming	Men's 4 × 100 m medley relay
42	Bronze	Lourdes Samson	Swimming	Women's 100m breaststroke
43	Bronze	Philippines	Swimming	Women's 4 × 100 m medley relay
44	Bronze	Jackie Castillejo; Jeannette Gomez; Dyan Castillejo; Edna Olivarez	Tennis	Women's team
45	Bronze	Philippines	Volleyball	Men's team
46	Bronze	Gregorio Colonia	Weightlifting	Men's 52kg Snatch
47	Bronze	Samuel Alegada	Weightlifting	Men's 56kg Overall
48	Bronze	Edmund Cardano	Weightlifting	Men's 67.5kg Clean & Jerk
49	Bronze	Edmund Cardano	Weightlifting	Men's 67.5kg Overall
50	Bronze	Renato Dio	Weightlifting	Men's 75kg Snatch
51	Bronze	Luis Bayanin	Weightlifting	Men's 90kg Snatch
52	Bronze	Luis Bayanin	Weightlifting	Men's 90kg Clean & Jerk
53	Bronze	Luis Bayanin	Weightlifting	Men's 90kg Overall
54	Bronze	Rogelio Alinbulio	Weightlifting	Men's 110kg Snatch

=== Multiple ===
Name	Sport	1st place, gold medalist(s)	2nd place, silver medalist(s)	3rd place, bronze medalist(s)	Total
William Wilson	Swimming	4	0	1	5
Jaime Sebastian	Weightlifting	3	0	0	3
Margarita Villareal	Sailing	3	0	0	3
Ramon Solis	Weightlifting	2	1	0	3
Cherrie Valera	Archery	2	0	1	3
Gregorio Colonia	Weightlifting	2	0	1	3
Rogelio Alinbulio	Weightlifting	2	0	1	3
Agrippina de la Cruz	Athletics	2	0	0	2
Christine Jacob	Swimming	2	0	0	2
Bong Coo	Bowling	1	2	1	4
Nathaniel Padilla	Shooting	1	2	0	3
Eleen Tinio	Judo	1	1	0	2
Lydia de Vega	Athletics	1	1	0	2
Francisco Guanco	Swimming	1	1	0	2
Jairulla Jaitulla	Swimming	1	1	0	2
Manuel Valleramos	Tennis	1	1	0	2
Renato Unso	Athletics	1	1	0	2
Joselito Andayan	Swimming	1	0	1	2
Jaime Legarda	Sailing	0	2	1	3
Paeng Nepomuceno	Bowling	0	2	1	3
Renato Dio	Weightlifting	0	2	1	3
Raul Reformado	Bowling	0	2	0	2
Edmund Cardano	Weightlifting	0	1	2	3
Samuel Alegada	Weightlifting	0	1	1	2
Luis Bayanin	Weightlifting	0	0	3	3
Judy Jaoud	Swimming	0	0	2	2
Prospero Olivas	Sailing	0	0	2	2

== Medal summary ==
=== By sports ===
Sport	Gold	Silver	Bronze	Total
Athletics	11	11	10	32
Weightlifting	9	5	9	23
Aquatics	9	4	10	23
Bowling	4	11	5	20
Sailing	4	3	6	13
Boxing	4	0	2	6
Shooting	2	9	5	16
Judo	2	2	4	8
Archery	2	0	1	3
Tennis	1	1	1	3
Basketball	1	1	0	2
Volleyball	0	1	1	2
Totals (12 entries)	49	48	54	151
