= Malaysia at the 1985 SEA Games =

Malaysia at the 1985 Southeast Asian Games
- IOC code: MAS
- NOC: Olympic Council of Malaysia
- Website: www.olympic.org.my (in English)

in Bangkok
- Competitors: 238 in 17 sports
- Medals Ranked 4th: Gold 26 Silver 28 Bronze 32 Total 86

Southeast Asian Games appearances (overview)
- 1959; 1961; 1965; 1967; 1969; 1971; 1973; 1975; 1977; 1979; 1981; 1983; 1985; 1987; 1989; 1991; 1993; 1995; 1997; 1999; 2001; 2003; 2005; 2007; 2009; 2011; 2013; 2015; 2017; 2019; 2021; 2023; 2025; 2027; 2029

Malaysia competed in the 1985 Southeast Asian Games held in Bangkok, Thailand from 8 to 17 December 1985. IT won 26 gold, 28 silver and 32 bronze medals.

== Medal summary ==
=== Medals by sport ===
Sport	Gold	Silver	Bronze	Total	Rank
Athletics	8	6	6	20	4
Badminton	1	1	3	5	2
Basketball	1	1	0	2	1
Bowling	1	2	2	5	4
Boxing	0	0	4	4	6
Football	0	0	1	1	3
Swimming	8	3	3	14	1
Table tennis	0	3	0	3	4
Water polo	0	1	0	1	2
Total	26	28	32	86	4

=== Medallists ===
Medal	Name	Sport	Event
Gold	Nordin Mohamed Jadi	Athletics	Men's 400 metres
Gold	Ramasamy Subramaniam	Athletics	Men's 800 metres
Gold	Sivalingam Muthiah	Athletics	Men's 1500 metres
Gold	Hanapiah Nasir	Athletics	Men's 110 metres hurdles
Gold	Vellasamy Subramaniam	Athletics	Men's 10,000 metres track walk
Gold	Hanapiah Nasir	Athletics	Men's long jump
Gold	Ramjit Nairulal	Athletics	Men's high jump
Gold	Samreet Singh Dhaliwal	Athletics	Men's hammer throw
Gold	Jalani Sidek; Razif Sidek	Badminton	Men's doubles
Gold	Malaysia national basketball team	Basketball	Women's tournament
Gold		Bowling	Men's singles
Gold	Nurul Huda Abdullah	Swimming	Women's 100 metre freestyle
Gold	Nurul Huda Abdullah	Swimming	Women's 200 metre freestyle
Gold	Nurul Huda Abdullah	Swimming	Women's 400 metre freestyle
Gold	Nurul Huda Abdullah	Swimming	Women's 800 metre freestyle
Gold	Seok Khoon May	Swimming	Women's 100 metre butterfly
Gold	Nurul Huda Abdullah	Swimming	Women's 200 metre butterfly
Gold	Nurul Huda Abdullah	Swimming	Women's 200 metre individual medley
Gold	Nurul Huda Abdullah	Swimming	Women's 400 metre individual medley
Silver	Rabuan Pit	Athletics	Men's 200 metres
Silver	G. Krishnan	Athletics	Men's 10,000 metres
Silver	Nasir Mohd Hanafiah; Nordin Mohamed Jadi; Rabuan Pit; Sivaling Govindasamy	Athletics	Men's 4 × 100 metres relay
Silver	Joseph Phan; Nordin Mohamed Jadi; Rabuan Pit; Sambasivam Murugan	Athletics	Men's 4 × 400 metres relay
Silver	Arjan Singh	Athletics	Men's shot put
Silver		Athletics	Women's high jump
Silver	Malaysia national badminton team	Badminton	Men's team
Silver	Malaysia national basketball team	Basketball	Men's tournament
Silver		Bowling	Women's singles
Silver		Bowling	Men's team
Silver	Seok Khoon May	Swimming	Women's 100 metre freestyle
Silver	Nurul Huda Abdullah	Swimming	Women's 100 metre butterfly
Silver	Seok Khoon May	Swimming	Women's 200 metre butterfly
Silver	Lim Chin Leong	Table tennis	Men's singles
Silver	Kok Chong Fatt (Anthony Kok Weng Xiong's Father); Peong Tah Seng	Table tennis	Men's doubles
Silver	Goh Shwu Fang	Table tennis	Women's singles
Silver	Malaysia national water polo team	Water polo	Men's tournament
Bronze	Sivaling Govindasamy	Athletics	Men's 200 metres
Bronze	G. Krishnan	Athletics	Men's 5000 metres
Bronze	Ramakrishnan M.	Athletics	Men's 3000 metres steeplechase
Bronze	Lou Cwee Peng	Athletics	Men's high jump
Bronze	Anita Ali; Kaur Harbans; Mumtaz Jaaffar; Sajarutuldur Hamzah	Athletics	Women's 4 × 100 metres relay
Bronze	Wong Leh King	Athletics	Women's heptathlon
Bronze	Ong Beng Teong	Badminton	Men's singles
Bronze	Razif Sidek; Leong Chai Lean	Badminton	Mixed doubles
Bronze	Malaysia national badminton team	Badminton	Women's team
Bronze		Bowling	Men's trios
Bronze		Bowling	Women's masters
Bronze	Yahaya Mohd Shad	Boxing	Men's 45 kg
Bronze	Hussin Abdul Rahman	Boxing	Men's 63.5 kg
Bronze	Md Saman Yaacoap	Boxing	Men's 71 kg
Bronze	Hock Singh Amarjit	Boxing	Men's 81 kg
Bronze	Malaysia national football team: Raimi Jamil; Ahmad Yusof; Ibrahim Saad; Gunasegaran; Lim Teong Kim; Serbegeth Singh; Kamarulzaman Yusof; Nasir Yusof; Salim Mahmud; Dollah Salleh; Khan Hung Meng; Saidin Osman; Kamaruddin Ahmad; Zainal Abidin Hassan	Football	Men's tournament
Bronze	Huang Ying Tsang	Swimming	Men's 1500 metre freestyle
Bronze	Seok Khoon May	Swimming	Women's 200 metre freestyle
Bronze	Jutta Mee Poh Tan; Marjorie Tan Suan Su; Nurul Huda Abdullah; Seok Khoon May	Swimming	Women's 4 × 100 metre freestyle relay

== Football ==
=== Men's tournament ===
Group B

Team	Pld	W	D	L	GF	GA	GD	Pts
Thailand	2	1	1	0	8	1	+7	3
Malaysia	2	1	1	0	7	1	+6	3
Philippines	2	0	0	2	0	13	−13	0

8 December 1985

Thailand	1 – 1	Malaysia
Piyapong Pue-on 27'		Dollah Salleh 76'

Suphachalasai Stadium
Attendance: 30.000
Referee: -

10 December 1985

Malaysia	6 – 0	Philippines

Suphachalasai Stadium
Referee: -

Semifinal

15 December 1985

Singapore	2 – 2 (PSO: 6–5)	Malaysia
Fandi Ahmad 57' 74'		Zainal Abidin Hassan 48'; Khan Hung Meng 89'
Penalties
V. Sundramoorthy (penalty scored); Hashim Hosni (penalty scored); Razali Saad (penalty scored); T. Pathmanathan (penalty scored); Salim Moin (penalty scored); Leong Kok Fann (penalty scored)	6 – 5	(penalty scored) Dollah Salleh; (penalty scored) Nasir Yusoff; (penalty scored) Zainal Abidin Hassan; (penalty scored) Khan Hung Meng; (penalty scored) Kamaruddin Ahmad; (penalty missed) Salim Mahmud-

Suphachalasai Stadium

Bronze medal match

16 December 1985

Malaysia	1 – 0	Indonesia
Lim Teong Kim 67'

Suphachalasai Stadium
Referee: -
