= Philippines at the 1985 SEA Games =

Philippines at the 1985 Southeast Asian Games
- IOC code: PHI
- NOC: Philippine Olympic Committee
- Website: www.olympic.ph (in English)

in Bangkok
- Medals Ranked 3rd: Gold 43 Silver 54 Bronze 32 Total 129

Southeast Asian Games appearances (overview)
- 1977; 1979; 1981; 1983; 1985; 1987; 1989; 1991; 1993; 1995; 1997; 1999; 2001; 2003; 2005; 2007; 2009; 2011; 2013; 2015; 2017; 2019; 2021; 2023; 2025; 2027; 2029

The Philippines participated at the 13th Southeast Asian Games held in Bangkok, Thailand from 8 to 17 December 1985.

== Medalists ==
=== Gold ===
No.	Medal	Name	Sport	Event
1	Gold	Joanne Chan	Archery	Women's individual
2	Gold	Joanne Chan	Archery	Women's ARSF 30
3	Gold	Philippines	Archery	Women's team
4	Gold	Hector Begeo	Athletics	Men's 5000m
5	Gold	Mario Castro	Athletics	Men's 10000m
6	Gold	Leopoldo Arnillo	Athletics	Men's 400m hurdles
7	Gold	Hector Begeo	Athletics	Men's 3000m Steeplechase
8	Gold	Isidro del Prado; Marlon Pagalilavan; Romeo Gido; Honesto Larce	Athletics	Men's 4 × 400 m Relay
9	Gold	Agrippina de la Cruz	Athletics	Women's 100m hurdles
10	Gold	Agrippina de la Cruz	Athletics	Women's 400m hurdles
11	Gold	Elma Muros	Athletics	Women's long jump
12	Gold	Erlinda Lavandia	Athletics	Women's javelin throw
13	Gold	Nene Gamo	Athletics	Women's Hepthatlon
14	Gold	Philippines	Basketball	Men's team
15	Gold	Philippines	Bowling	Men's doubles
16	Gold	Philippines	Bowling	Men's masters
17	Gold	Philippines	Bowling	Women's doubles
18	Gold	Philippines	Bowling	Women's team of 5
19	Gold	Leopoldo Serantes	Boxing	Men's 48kg
20	Gold	William Wilson	Swimming	Men's 200m freestyle
21	Gold	William Wilson	Swimming	Men's 400m freestyle
22	Gold	William Wilson	Swimming	Men's 1500m freestyle
23	Gold	Lee Concepcion	Swimming	Men's 200m breaststroke
24	Gold	Eric Buhain	Swimming	Men's 400m individual medley
25	Gold	Ramon Solis	Weightlifting	Men's Weightlifting

=== Silver ===
No.	Medal	Name	Sport	Event
1	Silver	Joanne Chan	Archery	Women's ARSF 50
2	Silver	Joanne Chan	Archery	Women's ARSF 60
3	Silver	Joanne Chan	Archery	Women's ARSF 70
4	Silver	Romeo Gido	Athletics	Men's 400m
5	Silver	Alex Ligtas	Athletics	Men's long jump
6	Silver	Luis Juico	Athletics	Men's high jump
7	Silver	Danilo Jarina	Athletics	Men's hammer throw
8	Silver	Philippines	Basketball	Women's team
9	Silver	Philippines	Bowling	Men's singles
10	Silver	Orlando Tacuyan	Boxing	Men's 51kg
11	Silver	Ruben Mares	Boxing	Men's 60kg
12	Silver	Ernesto Coronel	Boxing	Men's 71kg
13	Silver	René Concepcion	Swimming	Men's 400m freestyle
14	Silver	Enrico Rosquillo	Swimming	Men's 1500m freestyle
15	Silver	René Concepcion	Swimming	Men's 100m breaststroke
16	Silver	Francisco Guanco	Swimming	Men's 200m breaststroke
17	Silver	Jairulla Jaitulla	Swimming	Men's 200m individual medley
18	Silver	René Concepcion	Swimming	Men's 400m individual medley
19	Silver	René Concepcion; William Wilson; Enrico Rosquillo; Lee Concepcion	Swimming	Men's 4 × 200 m freestyle relay
20	Silver	Christine Jacob	Swimming	Women's 100m backstroke
21	Silver	Christine Jacob	Swimming	Women's 200m backstroke
22	Silver	Christine Jacob; Ma. Christina Bautista; Rose Luzelle Papa; Celestial De Leon	Swimming	Women's 4 × 100 m freestyle relay

=== Bronze ===
No.	Medal	Name	Sport	Event
1	Bronze	Karla Cabrera	Archery	Women's individual
2	Bronze	Karla Cabrera	Archery	Women's ARSF 30
3	Bronze	Karla Cabrera	Archery	Women's ARSF 50
4	Bronze	Karla Cabrera	Archery	Women's ARSF 60
5	Bronze	Karla Cabrera	Archery	Women's ARSF 70
6	Bronze	Jeremias Marques; Esmelado Punelas; Roel Pelosis; Raul Abangan	Athletics	Men's 4 × 100 m Relay
7	Bronze	Vidal Ferraren	Athletics	Men's shot put
8	Bronze	Elena Ganosa	Athletics	Women's 200m
9	Bronze	Nenita Dungca	Athletics	Women's 800m
10	Bronze	Dorie Cortejo	Athletics	Women's discus throw
11	Bronze	Philippines	Bowling	Men's team of 5
12	Bronze	Philippines	Bowling	Men's Match Play
13	Bronze	Philippines	Bowling	Women's doubles
14	Bronze	Philippines	Bowling	Women's Match Play
15	Bronze	Nelson Jamili	Boxing	Men's 45kg
16	Bronze	Alfredo Trazona	Boxing	Men's 67kg
17	Bronze	Ramon Napagao	Boxing	Men's 75kg
18	Bronze	Philippines	Football	Women's team
19	Bronze	Eric Buhain	Swimming	Men's 200m backstroke
20	Bronze	Jairulla Jaitulla	Swimming	Men's 100m breaststroke
21	Bronze	Renato Padronia	Swimming	Men's 200m backstroke
22	Bronze	René Concepcion; William Wilson; Enrico Rosquillo; Jairulla Jaitulla	Swimming	Men's 4 × 100 m freestyle relay
23	Bronze	Lee Concepcion; William Wilson; Renato Padronia; Eric Buhain	Swimming	Men's 4 × 100 m Medley Relay
24	Bronze	Rizza Maniego	Swimming	Women's 100m backstroke
25	Bronze	Rose Luzelle Papa	Swimming	Women's 100m breaststroke
26	Bronze	Christine Jacob; Rose Luzelle Papa; Maricar Maniego; Ma. Christina Bautista	Swimming	Men's 4 × 100 m Medley Relay

=== Multiple ===
Name	Sport	1st place, gold medalist(s)	2nd place, silver medalist(s)	3rd place, bronze medalist(s)	Total
William Wilson	Swimming	3	1	2	6
Joanne Chan	Archery	2	3	0	5
Agrippina de la Cruz	Athletics	2	0	0	2
Hector Begeo	Athletics	2	0	0	2
Lee Concepcion	Swimming	1	1	1	3
Romeo Gido	Athletics	1	1	0	2
Eric Buhain	Swimming	1	0	1	2
René Concepcion	Swimming	0	4	1	5
Christine Jacob	Swimming	0	3	1	4
Enrico Rosquillo	Swimming	0	2	1	3
Jairulla Jaitulla	Swimming	0	1	2	3
Rose Luzelle Papa	Swimming	0	1	2	3
Ma. Christina Bautisa	Swimming	0	1	1	2
Karla Cabrera	Archery	0	0	5	5
Renato Padronia	Swimming	0	0	2	2

== Medal summary ==
=== By sports ===
Sport	Gold	Silver	Bronze	Total
Athletics	10	4	5	19
Aquatics	5	10	8	23
Archery	3	3	5	11
Bowling	3	1	4	8
Boxing	1	3	3	7
Basketball	1	1	0	2
Football	0	0	1	1
Totals (7 entries)	23	22	26	71
