= Athletics at the 1983 SEA Games =

The athletics competition at the 1983 SEA Games was held at the National Stadium, Singapore.

== Medal summary ==
=== Men ===
Event	Gold		Silver		Bronze	
100 m	(Thailand) Suchart Jairsuraparp	10.59	(Indonesia) Mohamed Purnomo	10.62	(Thailand) Sumet Promna	10.67
200 m	(Thailand) Sumet Promna	21.62	(Singapore) Haron Mundir	21.76	(Indonesia) Mohamed Purnomo	21.82
400 m	(Philippines) Isidro del Prado	46.40 CR	(Malaysia) Nordin Mohamed Jadi	47.47 sec	(Thailand) Jumpapao Sanu	47.99
800 m	(Malaysia) Batulamai Rajakumar	1:49.31	(Thailand) Pen Kraiket	1:49.80	(Malaysia) Nordin Mohamed Jadi	1:50.95
1500 m	(Malaysia) Batulamai Rajakumar	3:50.13 CR	(Myanmar) Shwe Aung	3:50.79	(Philippines) Nestor Trampe	3:54.70
5000 m	(Myanmar) Maung Hla	14:46.49	(Myanmar) Aung Soe Khiang	14:47.83	(Philippines) David Carmelo	14:51.07
10,000 m	(Philippines) Leonardo Illut	31:57.42	(Myanmar) Aung Soe Khiang	32:11.35	(Singapore) Jagtar Singh	32:44.55
Marathon	(Myanmar) Soe Khin	2:32:51	(Philippines) Jimmy De la Torre	2:36:57	(Indonesia) Ali Sofyan Siregar	2:38:23
110 m hurdles	(Indonesia) Hero Prayogo	14.75	(Philippines) Renato Usno	14.76	(Malaysia) Hanafiah Nasir	14.93
400 m hurdles	(Philippines) Renato Usno	51.26	(Philippines) Jaime Grafilo	51.87	(Indonesia) Elisa Tanata	52.45
3000 m steeplechase	(Philippines) Hector Begeo	8:57.50	(Myanmar) Maung Hla	9:05.58	(Singapore) D. Selvarajoo	9:35.99
4 × 100 m relay	Thailand Somsak Boontud; Suchart Jairsuraparp; Prasit Boon Prasert; Sumet Promna	39.78 CR	Indonesia Mohammed Purnomo; Yulius Affar; Kardiono; I Wayan Budi Astra	40.58	Singapore Haron Mundir; Ong Yeok Phee; Alan Koh; Tang Ngai Kin	41.17
4 × 400 m relay	Thailand Nipon Boonchern; Pin Kraiket; Jumpapao Sanuk; Sumet Promna	3:10.29 CR	Malaysia Joseph Phan; Silvadurai Subramaniam; Batulamai Rajakumar; Nordin Mohamed Jadi	3:11.60	Indonesia Herman Mandagi; Mathias Mamby; I Wayan Budi Astra; Elisa Tanate	3:14.30
10 km walk	(Myanmar) Ferry Apparoa	46:03.19 CR	(Malaysia) Vellasamy Subramaniam	46:34.80	(Singapore) R. Nadarajan	47:24.01
20 km walk	(Myanmar) Ferry Apparoa	1:37:51.70	(Malaysia) Vellasamy Subramaniam	1:38:10.24	(Singapore) R. Nadarajan	1:40:39.30
Pole vault	(Philippines) Chamberlain Gonzales	4.20 m	(Thailand) Kanop Ratajumnong	4.10	(Philippines) Dario De Rosas	4.00
High jump	(Malaysia) Ramjit Nairulal	2.13 m CR	(Malaysia) Beng Tong Eng	2.04	(Philippines) Artnell Icocanoo	1.99
Long jump	(Indonesia) Marwoto	7.39 m	(Malaysia) Ahmad Mazlan	7.24	(Singapore) Ng Yee Meng	7.20
Triple jump	(Thailand) Sungworn Thaveechalermdit	15.37 m CR	(Philippines) Felicito Descutido	14.91	(Malaysia) Sulaiman Batek	14.90
Shot put	(Thailand) Bancha Supanroj	14.68	(Indonesia) Herman Dambuyai	14.00	(Philippines) Susano Erang	13.93
Discus throw	(Thailand) Ardol Kerdsri	45.68 m	(Indonesia) Suhadi Musiri	44.42	(Indonesia) Hanokbaransang	44.30
Hammer throw	(Philippines) Danila Jarina	48.80 m	(Malaysia) Samret Singh Dhalival	47.56	(Indonesia) Budi Dharma	44.26
Javelin throw	(Malaysia) Balang Lasung	67.32	(Philippines) Inocencio Maquiling	66.52	(Indonesia) Frans Mahuse	64.42
Decathlon	(Malaysia) Hanapiah Nasir	6890 pts	(Thailand) Thavorn Phanroeng		(Philippines) Andry Rosale	

=== Women ===
Event	Gold		Silver		Bronze	
100 m	(Thailand) Walapa Tangjitsusorn	11.75	(Philippines) Lydia de Vega	11.78	(Thailand) Jaree Patthaarath	11.87
200 m	(Philippines) Lydia de Vega	24.26	(Thailand) Walapa Tangjitsusorn	24.46	(Thailand) Jaree Patthaarath	24.55
400 m	(Indonesia) Emma Tahapari	55.34	(Myanmar) Thin Thin Maw	55.77	(Thailand) Usha Chanaphant	55.80
800 m	(Philippines) Lucena Alam	2:13.45	(Malaysia) Josephine Mary Singarayar	2:16.69	(Indonesia) Mary Manuhuttu	2:17.32
1500 m	(Myanmar) Mar Mar Min	4:26.73 CR	(Myanmar) Khin Khin Htwe	4:28.58	(Philippines) Margarita Tagun	4:37.47
3000 m	(Myanmar) Mar Mar Min	9:30.31 CR	(Myanmar) Khin Khin Htwe	9:42.48	(Singapore) Kandasamy Jayamani	10:03.32
Marathon	(Singapore) Kandasamy Jayamani	3:02:46	(Thailand) Yupin Lohachart	3:04:23	(Myanmar) Mar Mar Min	3:11:01
100 m hurdles	(Philippines) Agrippina de la Cruz	14.90	(Myanmar) New New Yee	14.97	(Myanmar) San San Aye	15.13
400 m hurdles	(Philippines) Agrippina de la Cruz	61.43	(Philippines) Susana Arangote	61.60	(Indonesia) Eklevia Rumayao	61.94
4 × 100 m relay	Thailand Pusadee Sangvijit; Walapa Tangjitnusorn; Jaree Patthaarath; Wanna Popirom	45.50 CR	Malaysia Can Swee Hua; Vengadasalam Angamah; Saik Oik Cum; Harbans Kaur	46.76	Philippines Perla Balatucan; Lorena Morcilla; Salve Cambonga; Elma Muros	47.13
4 × 400 m relay	Thailand Usa Chanaphani; Walapa Tangjitnusorn; Jaree Patthaarath; Reim Sriteingtrong	3:42.33	Philippines Lucena Alam; Perla Balatucan; Agrippina de la Cruz; Lydia De Vega	3:46.15	Malaysia Zaiton Othman; Josephine Mary Singarayar; Rasarathinan Selvarani; Vengadasalam Angamah	3:49.45
5 km walk	(Myanmar) Win Win	24:42.75 CR	(Indonesia) Iece Magdalena	26:04.75	(Malaysia) Paramasavik Sakthirani	27:04.72
10 km walk	(Myanmar) Su Su Yee	55:03.20 CR	(Singapore) Margaret Tan	55:41.7	(Malaysia) Cheah Bee Tin	55:54.00
High jump	(Thailand) Vannipa Yeepracha	1.77 m CR	(Myanmar) Khin On	1.68	(Indonesia) Yudhikarmani Darmadi	1.65
Long jump	(Philippines) Elma Muros	6.06 m CR	(Myanmar) San San Aye	5.99	(Malaysia) Can Swee Hua	5.75
Shot put	(Myanmar) Jennifer Tinlay	13.17 m	(Philippines) Consuelo Lacusong	12.00	(Indonesia) Yetty Tukayo	11.53
Discus throw	(Myanmar) Jennifer Tinlay	43.42 m	(Indonesia) Juliana Effendi	41.52	(Philippines) Dorie Cortejo	39.48
Javelin throw	(Malaysia) Norsham Yoon	45.74 m	(Philippines) Erlinda Lavandia	44.50	(Philippines) Billy Silanga	41.04
Heptathlon	(Malaysia) Zaiton Othman	5322 pts	(Philippines) Nene Gamo	4770	(Indonesia) Jublina Mangi	4575

== Medal table ==
Rank	Nation	Gold	Silver	Bronze	Total
1	Philippines (PHI)	11	11	10	32
2	Thailand (THA)	11	5	5	21
3	Burma (BIR)	10	10	2	22
4	Malaysia (MAS)	7	8	7	22
5	Indonesia (INA)	3	6	12	21
6	Singapore (SIN)	1	2	7	10
Totals (6 entries)		43	42	43	128
