= Sumet Promna =

Thai sprinter (born 1956)

Personal information
- Nationality: Thai
- Born: 9 January 1956 (age 70)

Sport
- Sport: Sprinting
- Event: 100 metres
Medal record
Men's athletics
Representing Thailand
Asian Championships
Gold medal – first place	1983 Kuwait City	200 m
Silver medal – second place	1981 Tokyo	200 m
Silver medal – second place	1981 Tokyo	4×100 m
Silver medal – second place	1983 Kuwait City	100 m
Silver medal – second place	1983 Kuwait City	4×100 m
Bronze medal – third place	1981 Tokyo	100 m
Southeast Asian Games
Gold medal – first place	1981 Manila	200m
Gold medal – first place	1981 Manila	4×100m relay
Gold medal – first place	1983 Singapore	4×100m relay
Gold medal – first place	1983 Singapore	4×400m relay
Silver medal – second place	1981 Manila	100m
Silver medal – second place	1985 Bangkok	100m
Bronze medal – third place	1983 Singapore	100m

Sumet Promna (born 9 January 1956) is a Thai sprinter. He competed in the men's 100 metres at the 1984 Summer Olympics.
