= Athletics at the 1981 SEA Games =

Events at the Southeast Asian Games

- Venue: Rizal Memorial Stadium
- Location: Manila, Philippines
- Dates: 10–15 December

The athletics competition at the 1981 SEA Games was held from 10 December to 15 December at the Rizal Memorial Stadium, Manila, Philippines.

== Medal table ==
Rank	Nation	Gold	Silver	Bronze	Total
1	Burma (BIR)	13	7	4	24
2	Malaysia (MAS)	11	14	5	30
3	Philippines (PHI)	9	9	11	29
4	Thailand (THA)	6	5	6	17
5	Indonesia (INA)	3	6	10	19
6	Singapore (SIN)	0	1	6	7
Totals (6 entries)		42	42	42	126

== Medal summary ==
=== Men ===
Event	Gold		Silver		Bronze	
100 m	(Thailand) Suchart Jairsuraparp	10.6	(Thailand) Sumet Promna	10.7	(Singapore) Tang Ngai Kin	11.10
200 m	(Thailand) Sumet Promna	21.14 CR	(Malaysia) Rabuan Pit	21.22	(Indonesia) Jeffry Matahelemual	21.47
400 m	(Philippines) Isidro del Prado	47.10 CR	(Malaysia) Rabuan Pit	47.15	(Malaysia) Adaikan Balakrishnan	47.94
800 m	(Philippines) Isidro del Prado	1:48.79	(Thailand) Pichai Pew-Kram	1:49.51	(Thailand) Pen Kraiket	1:51.26
1500 m	(Thailand) Pichai Pewram	4:0.24	(Malaysia) Raju Manusammy	4:04.04	(Malaysia) Mutiah Sivalingam	4:04.30
5000 m	(Myanmar) Aung Soe Khiang	14:40.8	(Philippines) David Carmelo	14:48.09	(Philippines) Arturo Alimbuyao	14.53.08
10,000 m	(Philippines) David Carmelo	31:11.77	(Philippines) Arturo Alimbuyao	31:11.77	(Myanmar) Michael	31:49.15
Marathon	(Philippines) Jimmy De la Torre	2:25:50	(Myanmar) Michael	2:26:28	(Indonesia) Ali Sofyan Siregar	2:28:50
110 m hurdles	(Myanmar) Hpone Myint	14.43	(Malaysia) Masharuddin Mohammad Nor	14.60	(Thailand) Surapol Sublar	14.75
400 m hurdles	(Philippines) Jaime Grafilo	52.19 CR	(Malaysia) Nyan Chong Jong	52.84	(Indonesia) Melly Mofu	53.40
3000 m steeplechase	(Myanmar) Maung Hla	8:56.15	(Myanmar) Aung Soe Khiang	9:0.35	(Philippines) Hector Begeo	9:6.75
4 × 100 m relay	Thailand Somsak Boontud; Suchart Jairsuraparp; Prasit Boon Prasert; Sumet Promna	39.93	Indonesia Mohammad Hariyanto; Suwantoro; Yulius Affar; Leo Kapissa	40.54	Singapore Haron Mundir; Tang Ngai Kin; Andrew Toh; Ganesan Kasee	41.16
4 × 400 m relay	Philippines	3:10.29 CR	Malaysia	3:11.60	Indonesia	3:14.30
10 km walk	(Malaysia) Vellasamy Subramaniam	46:45.1	(Malaysia) Batumali Kumarasamy	47:36.4	(Singapore) Rengasamy Nadarajan	50.59.3
20 km walk	(Malaysia) Vellasamy Subramaniam	1:36:34.5	(Singapore) Rengasamy Nadarajan	1:42:54.1	(Malaysia) Phillip Lim	1:43:57.1
Pole vault	(Myanmar) See Myint Aung	4.36 m	(Myanmar) Thet Tun Kyaw	3.96	(Philippines) Manuel del Oro	3.60
High jump	(Malaysia) Ho Yoon Wah	2.10 m	(Malaysia) Eng Beng Piong	1.99	(Singapore) Nor Azhar Hamid	1.97
Long jump	(Myanmar) Thant Zin	7.32 m	(Philippines) Roger Dumaguit	7.14	(Indonesia) Mochammad Mochtar	7.11
Triple jump	(Indonesia) Yong Tjong Hoo	15.26 m	(Indonesia) Mochammad Mochtar	15.23	(Philippines) Felicito Descutido	15.09
Shot put	(Thailand) Bancha Supanroj	15.46 m CR	(Philippines) Susano Erang	13.64	(Thailand) Sumai Chartmontree	12.92
Discus throw	(Indonesia) Suhadi Musiri	44.93 m	(Thailand) Ardol Kerdsri	44.24	(Philippines) Danilo Jarina	42.23
Hammer throw	(Indonesia) Budi Dharma	49.85 m CR	(Malaysia) Samret Singh Dhalival	47.56	(Philippines) Danilo Jarina	46.40
Javelin throw	(Malaysia) Balang Lasung	68.48 m	(Indonesia) Frans Mahuse	67.00	(Thailand) Piechi Joedee	64.88
Decathlon	(Malaysia) Hanapiah Nasir	6719 pts	(Thailand) Thavorn Phanroeng	6519	(Myanmar) See Myint Aung	4333

=== Women ===
Event	Gold		Silver		Bronze	
100 m	(Malaysia) Mumtaz Jaffar	11.84	(Indonesia) Henny Maspaitella	11.90	(Thailand) Walapa Tangjitsusorn	12.09
200 m	(Philippines) Lydia de Vega	23.54 CR	(Malaysia) Mumtaz Jaffar	24.21	(Indonesia) Henny Maspaitella	24.40
400 m	(Philippines) Lydia de Vega	54.78 CR	(Malaysia) Vengadasalam Angamah	55.76	(Malaysia) Saik Oik Chum	56.65
800 m	(Malaysia) Vengadasalam Angamah	2:11.18	(Philippines) Lucena Alam	2:11.48	(Thailand) Chongchai Bossi	2:12.21
1500 m	(Myanmar) Than Than Lwin	4:46.54	(Myanmar) Khawja	4:46.75	(Philippines) Margarita Tagun	4:47.75
3000 m	(Myanmar) Khawja	9:57.29	(Myanmar) Than Than Lwin	10:00.42	(Indonesia) Welmintje Sombay	10:01.16
100 m hurdles	(Myanmar) Nwee Nwee Yee	14.35	(Philippines) Antonio De la Cruz	14.58	(Philippines) Lucila Tolentino	14.64
400 m hurdles	(Myanmar) Than Than	1:0.29	(Indonesia) Eklevia Rumayao	1:03.3	(Myanmar) Nwe Nwe Yee	1:03.39
4 × 100 m relay	Malaysia Zaiton Othman; Mumtaz Jaffar; Saik Oik Chum; Vengadasalam Angamah	46.62	Philippines Lydia de Vega; Lorena Morcilla; Elma Muros; Perla Balatucan	46.84	Indonesia Vonny Sondakh; Henny Maspaitella; Yudhikarmani Darmadi; Hapsani	48.00
4 × 400 m relay	Malaysia Zaiton Othman; Mumtaz Jaffar; Saik Oik Chum; V. Angamah	3:41.35 CR	Philippines Lydia de Vega; Lucena Alam; Lorena Morcilla; Agrippina de la Cruz	3:49.89	Indonesia Sukarmiati; Eklevina Rumayao; Rosalina Erari; Jeany Sumampauw	3:51.86
5 km walk	(Myanmar) Su Su Yee	26:54.8	(Malaysia) Paramasavik Sakthirani	27:40.75	(Singapore) Margaret Tan	27:47.7
10 km walk	(Malaysia) Paramasavik Sakthirani	55:11.5	(Myanmar) Su Su Yee	56:20.8	(Singapore) Margaret Tan	57:43.1
High jump	(Thailand) Vannipa Yeepracha	1.70 m	(Malaysia) Zaiton Othman	1.61	(Indonesia) Yudhikarmani Darmadi	1.61
Long jump	(Myanmar) San San Aye	5.93 m CR	(Myanmar) Mra Thuza	5.86	(Malaysia) Zaiton Othman	5.70
Shot put	(Myanmar) Jennifer Tinlay	13.77 m	(Indonesia) Mace Siahannenia	13.64	(Philippines) Consuelo Lacusong	12.92
Discus throw	(Myanmar) Jennifer Tinlay	45.88 m	(Philippines) Dorie Cortejo	40.69	(Myanmar) Khin Nye	38.25
Javelin throw	(Philippines) Erlinda Lavandia	46.20 m CR	(Malaysia) Norsham Yoon	45.92	(Philippines) Billy Silanga	41.30
Heptathlon	(Malaysia) Zaiton Othman	5338 pts	(Thailand) Y. Vanipa	4973	(Philippines) Nene Gamo	4302
