= Boxing at the 1983 SEA Games =

The Boxing at the 1983 SEA Games was held between 30 May to 3 June at Singapore University Gymnasium.

== Medal summary ==
Event	Gold	Silver	Bronze
Pinweight	(Philippines) Nelson Jamili	(Indonesia) Wahab Bahari	(Myanmar) Kyaw Han (Singapore) N. Subramaniam
Light-flyweight	(Indonesia) Johny Asadoma	(Thailand) Wansuradej Hayedoror	(Philippines) Leopoldo Serantes (Myanmar) Myint Soe Lay
Flyweight	(Philippines) Efren Tabanas	(Singapore) M. P. Kathirasan	(Indonesia) Mohammad Nasori (Brunei) Adi Duraman
Bantamweight	(Thailand) Wanchai Pongsri	(Singapore) Tang Leong Kok	(Indonesia) Wan Sapulette
Featherweight	(Philippines) Leopoldo Cantancio	(Thailand) Sukum Nobrom	(Brunei) Zaini Rahman (Singapore) R. Rathakrishnan
Light-welterweight	(Thailand) Dhawee Umponmaha	(Indonesia) Adi Suwandana	(Singapore) Ng Tong Chye (Philippines) Patticio Gnapi
Welterweight	(Thailand) Sumruay Mongsont	(Singapore) Mohammad Mukhlis	(Indonesia) Francisco Lisboa
Lightweight	(Myanmar) Zaw Latt	(Indonesia) Mika Tobing	(Thailand) Rahon Sunagkamernd (Singapore) Thomas Lim
Light-middleweight	(Philippines) Raymond Suioo	(Thailand) Boonthan Silakorn	(Indonesia) Minarto (Brunei) Yusof Ismail
Middleweight	(Indonesia) Jonas Giay	(Thailand) Charlee Maluleen	(Brunei) Ismail Ali
Light-heavyweight	(Thailand) Punya Sornnoj	(Singapore) K. Krishnan	(Indonesia) Edward Atarin (Malaysia) Amarjit Singh
Heavyweight	(Indonesia) Ludewig Akwan	(Thailand) Anan Inkarnkat	

== Medal table ==
Rank	Nation	Gold	Silver	Bronze	Total
1	Thailand (THA)	4	5	1	10
2	Philippines (PHI)	4	0	2	6
3	Indonesia (INA)	3	3	5	11
4	Burma (BIR)	1	0	2	3
5	Singapore (SIN)	0	4	4	8
6	Brunei (BRU)	0	0	4	4
7	Malaysia (MAS)	0	0	1	1
Totals (7 entries)		12	12	19	43
