= Bowling at the 1983 SEA Games =

The Bowling at the 1983 SEA Games result. This event was held between 29 May to 4 June at Jackie's Bowl Centre, Singapore City. Singapore became the overall champion after collecting 11 of the 16 available gold medals

== Medal table ==
Rank	Nation	Gold	Silver	Bronze	Total
1	Singapore (SIN)	11	2	4	17
2	Philippines (PHI)	4	11	5	20
3	Thailand (THA)	1	2	3	6
4	Indonesia (INA)	0	1	1	2
5	Malaysia (MAS)	0	0	3	3
Totals (5 entries)		16	16	16	48

== Medal summary ==
=== Men's ===
Event	Gold		Silver		Bronze	
Single 6 games	(Singapore) Samuel Ho	1.267 pts	(Philippines) Paeng Nepomuceno	1.265	(Indonesia) Paulus Poerwadi	1.240
Masters	(Singapore) Ronnie Ng		(Philippines) Raul Reformado		(Philippines) Paeng Nepomuceno	
All Events	(Singapore) Ronnie Ng	5.129 pts	(Philippines) Paeng Nepomuceno	4.916	(Malaysia) Foong Yet Hong	4.815
Doubles	(Thailand) Surachai Kasemsiriroj (Thailand) Somsak Kruasingha	2.482 pts	(Philippines) Raul Reformado (Philippines) Ortega San Jose	2.461	(Singapore) Samuel Ho (Singapore) Ronnie Ng	2.437
Three-man	(Singapore) SINGAPORE	1.857 pts	(Philippines) PHILIPPINES	1.824	(Singapore) SINGAPORE	1.808
Five-man	(Singapore) SINGAPORE	2.905 pts	(Philippines) PHILIPPINES	2.879	(Malaysia) MALAYSIA	2.792
Trio	(Singapore) SINGAPORE	3.620 pinfalls	(Philippines) PHILIPPINES	3.549	(Singapore) SINGAPORE (Malaysia) MALAYSIA	3.511
Quintets	(Singapore) SINGAPORE	5.893	(Indonesia) INDONESIA	5.703	(Malaysia) MALAYSIA	5.702

=== Women ===
Event	Gold		Silver		Bronze	
Single 6 games	(Singapore) Delia Milne	1.185 pts	(Philippines) Bong Coo	1.153	(Thailand) Pranee Kitipongpithya	1.147
Masters	(Philippines) Bec Watanabe		(Philippines) Bong Coo		(Philippines) Arianne Cerdeña	
All events	(Philippines) Bong Coo	4.612 pts	(Singapore) Adelene Wee	4.592	(Thailand) Pranee Kitipongpithya	4.502
Doubles	(Singapore) Adelene Wee (Singapore) Delia Milne	2.249 pts	(Thailand) Orawan Nithinavakorn (Thailand)	2.190	(Philippines) Bong Coo (Philippines) Rita De La Rosa	2.184
Three-woman	(Philippines) PHILIPPINES	1.694 pts	(Singapore) SINGAPORE	1.687	(Philippines) PHILIPPINES	1.602
Five-woman	(Singapore) SINGAPORE	2.760 pts	(Philippines) PHILIPPINES	2.717	(Thailand) THAILAND	2.673
Trio	(Singapore) SINGAPORE	3.472 pinfalls	(Philippines) PHILIPPINES	3.378	(Philippines) PHILIPPINES	3.369
Quintets	(Philippines) PHILIPPINE	5.438	(Thailand) THAILAND	5.379	(Singapore) SINGAPORE	5.369
