= Christian Nenepath =

Indonesian sprinter

Personal information
- Nationality: Indonesian
- Born: 21 April 1961 North Sulawesi, Indonesia
- Died: 2008 (aged 46–47)

Sport
- Sport: Sprinting
- Event: 100 metres
Medal record
Men's athletics
Representing Indonesia
Southeast Asian Games
Gold medal – first place	1985 Bangkok	100 m
Gold medal – first place	1985 Bangkok	4x100 m

Christian Nenepath (21 April 1961 – 2008) was an Indonesian sprinter. He competed in the men's 100 metres at the 1984 Summer Olympics. He surprisingly won the 1985 SEA Games gold medal in the 100 m and 4 x 100 m events.
