= Equestrian at the 1983 SEA Games =

The Equestrian at the 1983 Southeast Asian Games was held between 30 May to 3 June at Bukit Timah Polo Club. The South East Asian Games is held biannually and involves over 11 countries in South East Asia. The 1983 Southeast Asian Games were the 12th year of these games.

== Medal summary ==
=== Men ===
Event	Gold	Silver	Bronze
Dressage and Jumping	(Singapore) Peter Abishegandan	(Indonesia) Samri	(Philippines) Mariella Virata
Dressage team	(Singapore) SINGAPORE	(Indonesia) INDONESIA	(Malaysia) MALAYSIA
Leaders	(Singapore) Peter Abishegandan	(Philippines) Mariella Virata	(Indonesia) Samri
Leaders team	(Singapore) SINGAPORE	(Indonesia) INDONESIA	(Malaysia) MALAYSIA
Team	(Malaysia) MALAYSIA	(Philippines) PHILIPPINES	(Singapore) SINGAPORE

== Medal table ==
Rank	Nation	Gold	Silver	Bronze	Total
1	Singapore (SIN)	4	0	1	5
2	Malaysia (MAS)	1	0	2	3
3	Indonesia (INA)	0	3	1	4
4	Philippines (PHI)	0	2	1	3
Totals (4 entries)		5	5	5	15
