= Here Comes the Groom =

Here Comes the Groom may refer to:

- Here Comes the Groom (1934 film), an American Pre-Code comedy film
- Here Comes the Groom (1951 film), an American musical romantic comedy film
- Here Comes the Groom (2023 film), a Philippine comedy film
- Here Comes the Groom (album), a 1990 album by John Wesley Harding

== See also ==
- Here Comes the Bride (disambiguation)
