= Zaw Latt =

Burmese boxer (born 1957)

Personal information
- Nationality: Burmese
- Born: 4 October 1957 (age 69) Northern Burma
- Years active: 1983–1984
- Height: 167 cm (5 ft 6 in)
- Weight: 60 kg (132 lb; 9 st 6 lb)

Sport
- Sport: Boxing
- Coached by: Khin Maung Win (1983–1984)
Medal record
Gold medal – first place	1983 Singapore	light welterweight

Zaw Latt (born 4 October 1957) is a Burmese boxer. He competed in the light welterweight event at the 1983 Southeast Asian Games, defeating Mika Tobing in the final. He competed in the men's lightweight event at the 1984 Summer Olympics. There, he lost to Christopher Ossai of Nigeria in the first round and was eliminated.

== Early life ==
Latt was born on 4 October 1957 in Northern Burma, and was recruited to the Burmese Army when he was 18 years old. He began his boxing career in the military's athletic program. It was his main job in the military, however he did also learn how to do his combat duties.

== Career ==
=== Southeast Asian Games ===
He competed in the light welterweight class in boxing at the 1983 Southeast Asian Games. His quarterfinal match was against Ganesan Murugesu of Malaysia, which he won on 1 June, advancing him to the next round. He then fought in the semifinals, two days later, against Thomas Lim of Singapore, winning and advancing to the finals. There he had a match against the Indonesian Mika Tobing on 5 June, who he defeated with a knockout in the second round, winning him the gold medal. All of these matches took place at Ngee Ann Polytechnic, Singapore.

=== Olympics ===
He then went to compete at the men's lightweight event at the 1984 Summer Olympics. He was the only Burmese athlete there, as chef de mission, Nyein Aung, said that the nation would only send athletes it believed had a chance of success. Three people went to the Olympics for Burma: Latt, Aung, and his coach, Khin Maung Win, the 1959 South East Asian Peninsular Games champion. Latt was the flagbearer for Burma at the Olympics.

On 29 July, he fought his first round match against Christopher Ossai of Nigeria, nearly knocking him out in the first round. The second round was even, and Ossai won the third and final round, ending the match with a decision 5–0. No judges favored Latt and all five favored Ossai. He placed 33rd overall. While feeling he "had the upper hand" prior to the last round, he indicated he felt the decision was fair.

Points
Boxer	Judges Favoring	Judge 1's Score	Judge 2's Score	Judge 3's Score	Judge 4's Score	Judge 5's Score	Total Score	References
Zaw Latt	0	58	57	55	56	56	282	
Christopher Ossai	5	59	60	60	59	60	298	

After his loss, he stayed with his coach and watched swimming and boxing for training ideas. While waiting for the end of the Olympics in the Olympic Village, he remarked that he was not keen on the food options and missed having curry. However, at the beginning of the Games, his interpreter had said that Latt was happy with the food on offer.

== Personal ==
As of 1984, he was married and has two children. He also did not speak English.

== See also ==
- Burma at the 1984 Summer Olympics
