= Judo at the 1983 SEA Games =

The Judo at the 1983 Southeast Asian Games was held between 30 May to 3 June at Nanyang Technological Institute.

== Medal summary ==
=== Men ===
| Event | Gold | Silver | Bronze |
|---|---|---|---|
| Below 60 kg | (Indonesia) Agus Prijono | (Thailand) Kitti Petdasada | (Singapore) Ding Gee Sing (Malaysia) Zamani Yusoff |
| Above 65 kg | (Indonesia) Bambang Prakarsa | (Thailand) Pakit Santhisiri | (Singapore) Tang Soon Onn |
| 71 kg | (Thailand) Polsak Riatmaneesri | (Philippines) Andres Macion | (Malaysia) Woi Yim Tiong |
| Below 78 kg | (Indonesia) Joh Heng Phie | (Thailand) Marug Techawanit | (Philippines) Oscar Bautista (Malaysia) Teo Yaw Hock |
| Below 86 kg | (Thailand) Hassabodin Rojanachiva | (Indonesia) Oentung Putro Setiono | (Philippines) Rolan Llamas (Malaysia) Manmohan Singh |
| Below 95 kg | (Indonesia) Haryanto Chandra | (Singapore) T. M. Sundram | |
| Over 95 kg | (Indonesia) Perrence George Pantouw | (Singapore) Ho Yen Chye | |
| Open | (Indonesia) Perrence George Pantouw | (Indonesia) Haryanto Chandra | (Thailand) Hussabodin Rajanachiva (Thailand) Panya Diswath |

=== Women ===
| Event | Gold | Silver | Bronze |
|---|---|---|---|
| 48 kg | (Thailand) Chaifrmsrtmuenuichit | (Singapore) Violet Lee | (Myanmar) Thi Thi Sein (Philippines) Dina Panganiban |
| Below 52 kg | (Indonesia) Sri Rahayu | (Thailand) Nantika Jennantakajorn | (Malaysia) Ho Lee Mee |
| Below 56 kg | (Thailand) Lamai Yardtorng | (Indonesia) Enny Tri Astuti | (Philippines) Agnes Vallejo |
| 61 kg | (Philippines) Maria Teresa Padre | (Myanmar) Phyu Phyu Thant | (Indonesia) Sayu Gde Pujiati |
| 66 kg | (Indonesia) Elly Amalia | (Malaysia) Lai Siew Yoong | (Singapore) Neo Lee Hong |
| Below 72 kg | (Myanmar) Khin Mu Mu | (Indonesia) Pujawati Utama | (Thailand) Aree Leelachan |
| Above 72 kg | (Philippines) Eleen Tinio | (Thailand) Suparta Yompakdee | (Indonesia) Ida Iriani Kandi (Singapore) Annette Keet |
| Open | (Myanmar) Khin Mu Mu | (Philippines) Eleen Tinio | (Indonesia) Elly Amalia (Indonesia) Sri Rahayu |

== Medal table ==
| Rank | Nation | Gold | Silver | Bronze | Total |
|---|---|---|---|---|---|
| 1 | Indonesia (INA) | 8 | 4 | 4 | 16 |
| 2 | Thailand (THA) | 4 | 5 | 3 | 12 |
| 3 | Philippines (PHI) | 2 | 2 | 4 | 8 |
| 4 | Burma (BIR) | 2 | 1 | 1 | 4 |
| 5 | Singapore (SIN) | 0 | 3 | 4 | 7 |
| 6 | Malaysia (MAS) | 0 | 1 | 5 | 6 |
| Totals (6 entries) | | 16 | 16 | 21 | 53 |
