= Paeng Nepomuceno =

Filipino ten-pin bowler

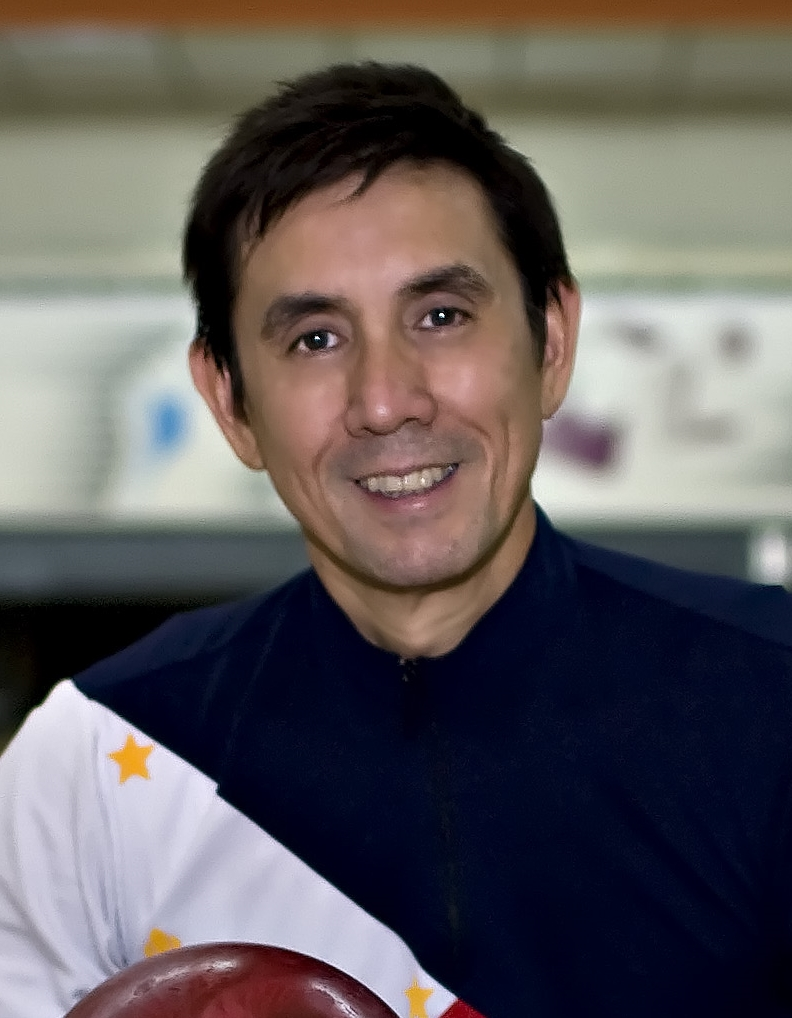
- Paeng Nepomuceno in 2008

Personal information
- Full name: Rafael Villareal Nepomuceno
- Nickname: Paeng
- Born: January 30, 1957 (age 69) Quezon City, Philippines
- Education: La Salle Green Hills; Adamson University
- Occupations: Bowling player and coach
- Years active: 1970–present
- Spouse: Saira Puyat
- Website: www.paengbowling.com

Sport
- Country: Philippines
- Sport: Bowling
- Coached by: Angel Nepomuceno

Achievements and titles
- World finals: 1976 Bowling World Cup: Champion; 1980 Bowling World Cup: Champion; 1992 Bowling World Cup: Champion; 1996 Bowling World Cup: Champion; 1999 World Tenpin Masters: Champion; 1984 World Invitational Tournament: Champion
Medal record
Representing Philippines
Men's Bowling
Event	1st	2nd	3rd
World Bowling Championships	–	3	1
World Games	–	–	2
Asian Games	1	1	–
Asian Championships	6	1	1
Federal Territory	5	–	–
Southeast Asian Games	9	5	5
Asian Seniors Championship	1	-	1
Total	22	10	10
World Tenpin Bowling Championships
Silver medal – second place	1991 Singapore	Team
Bronze medal – third place	1991 Singapore	Doubles
Silver medal – second place	1987 Helsinki	Singles
Silver medal – second place	1983 Caracas	Trios
World Games
Bronze medal – third place	1997 Lahti	Singles
Bronze medal – third place	1993 Hague	Singles
Asian Games
Gold medal – first place	2002 Busan	Doubles
Silver medal – second place	1994 Hiroshima	Team of five
Asian Championships
Gold medal – first place	Taiwan 1998	All Events
Bronze medal – third place	Taiwan 1998	Masters
Gold medal – first place	Guam 1994	Masters
Gold medal – first place	Singapore 1984	All Events
Gold medal – first place	Manila 1982	Doubles
Gold medal – first place	Manila 1982	All Events
Gold medal – first place	Jakarta 1976	Masters
Silver medal – second place	Tokyo 1974	Team of five
Southeast Asian Games
Bronze medal – third place	Jakarta 1997	Singles
Silver medal – second place	1993 Singapore	Trio
Bronze medal – third place	1993 Singapore	Masters
Bronze medal – third place	1993 Singapore	All Events
Gold medal – first place	1991 Manila	Singles
Silver medal – second place	1991 Manila	All Events
Gold medal – first place	1987 Indonesia	Singles
Gold medal – first place	1987 Indonesia	Doubles
Gold medal – first place	1987 Indonesia	All Events
Bronze medal – third place	1987 Indonesia	Team
Gold medal – first place	1985 Bangkok	Doubles
Gold medal – first place	1985 Bangkok	All Events
Silver medal – second place	1983 Singapore	Singles
Silver medal – second place	1983 Singapore	Team
Silver medal – second place	1983 Singapore	All Events
Bronze medal – third place	1983 Singapore	Masters
Gold medal – first place	1981 Manila	Doubles
Gold medal – first place	1981 Manila	Trios
Gold medal – first place	1981 Manila	All Events

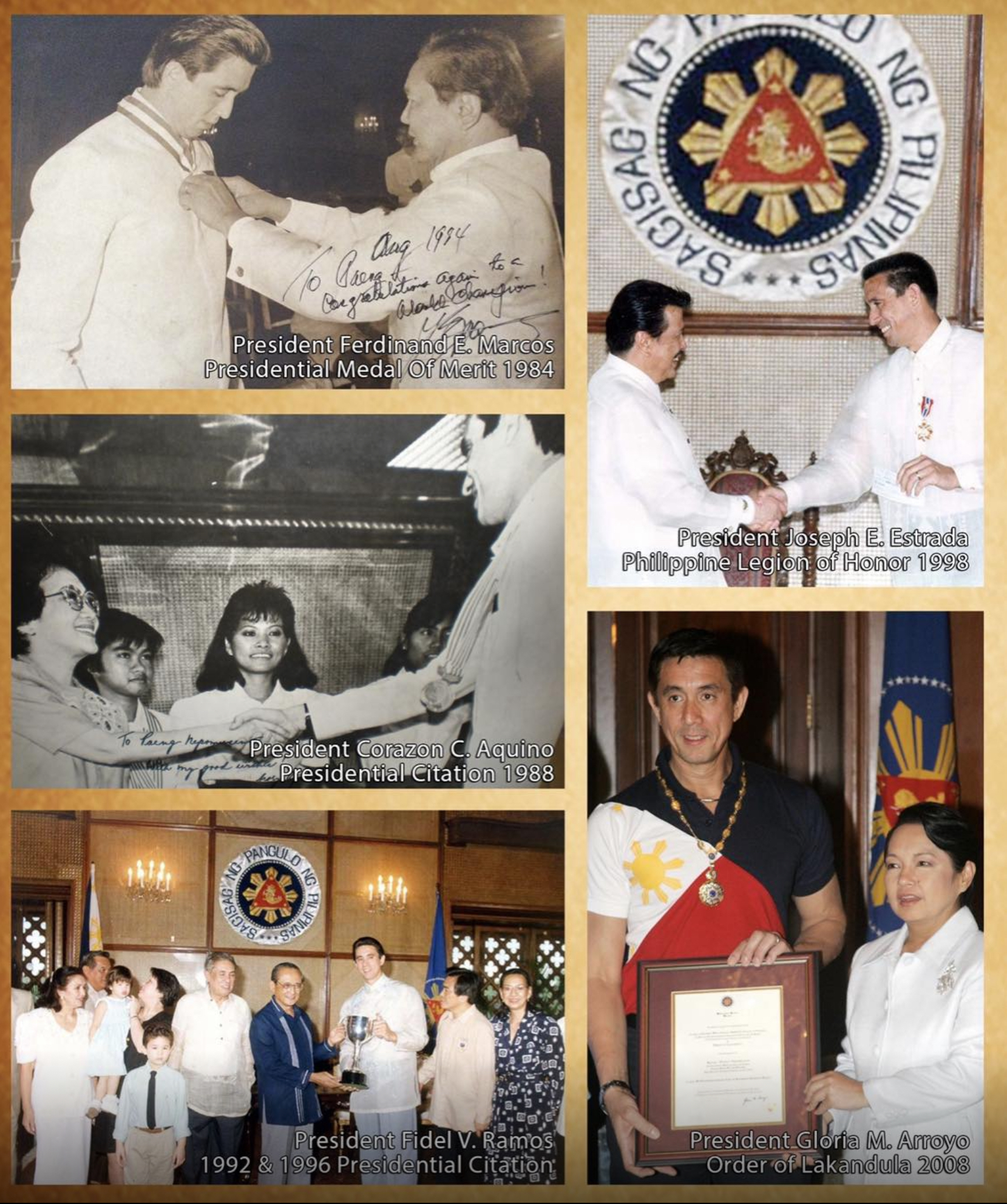
Nepomuceno being honored Six times by Five Philippine Presidents with the Presidential Medal of Merit in 1984, Philippine Legion of Honor in 1999, Order of Lakandula in 2008 and Presidential Citations in 1988, 1992 and 1996.

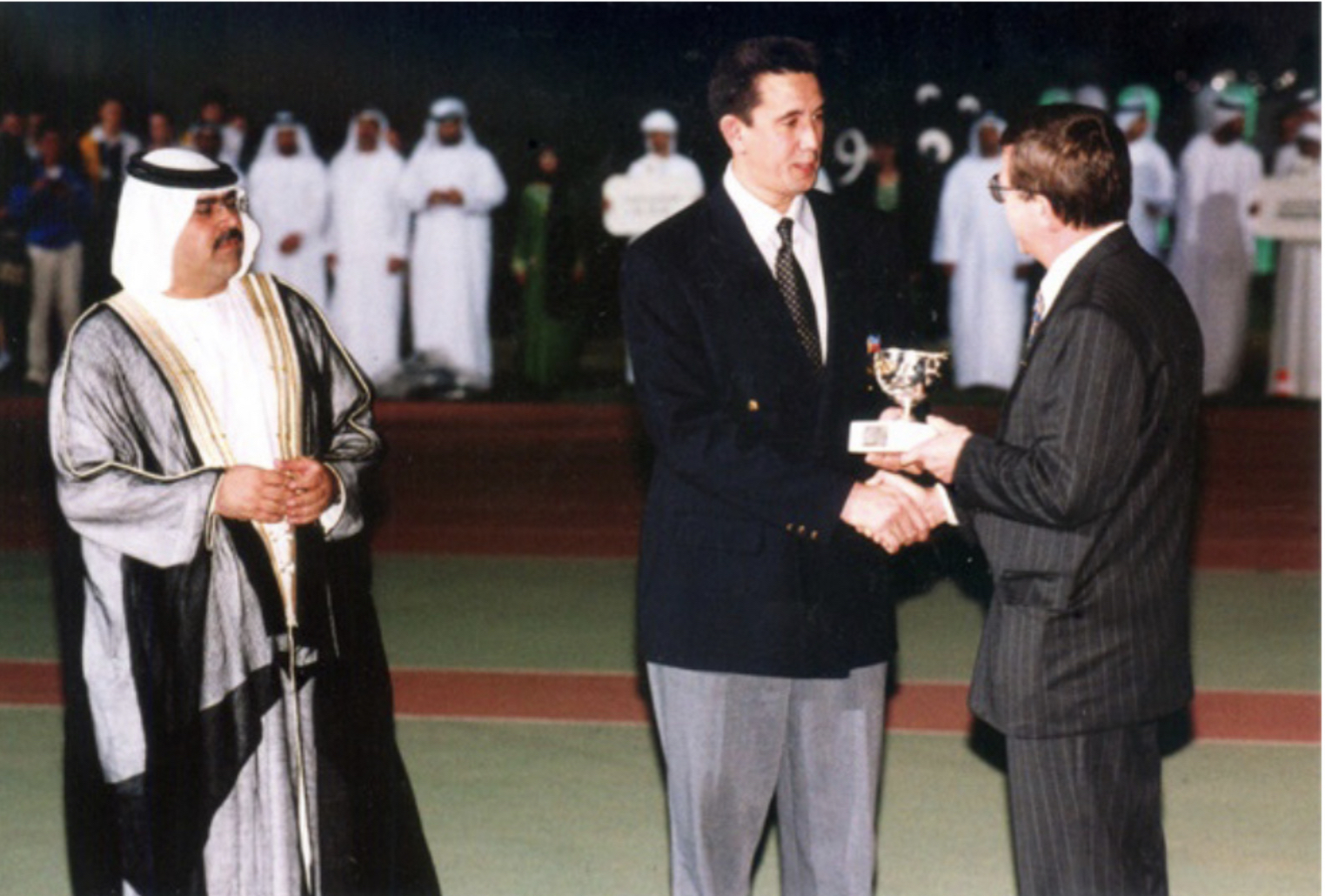
Nepomuceno being awarded the IOC ( International Olympic Committee) Presidents Trophy in 1999 in Abu Dhabi, UAE.

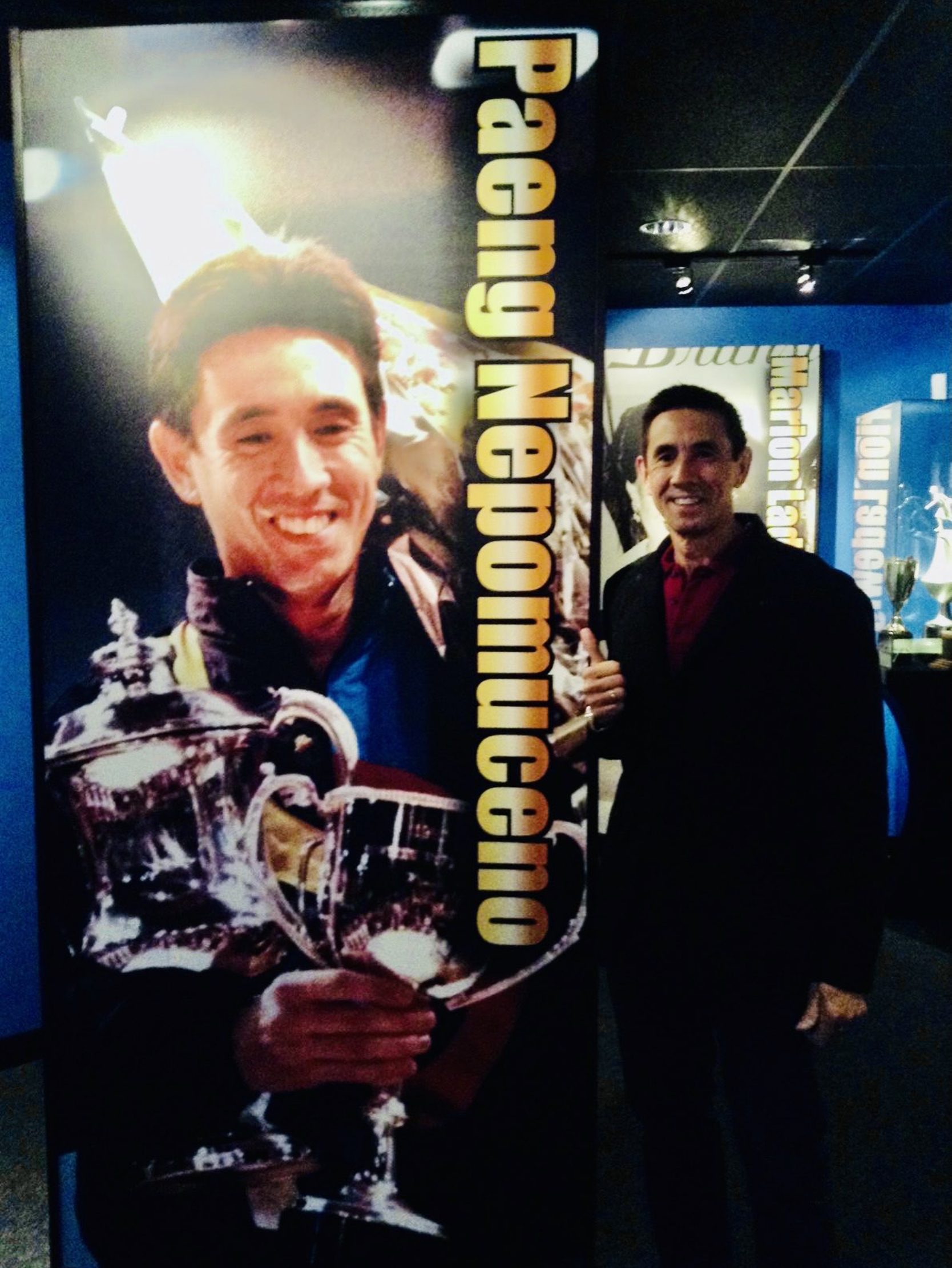
Nepomuceno at the Entrance of the International Bowling Hall of Fame and Museum, Arlington, Texas in 2010.

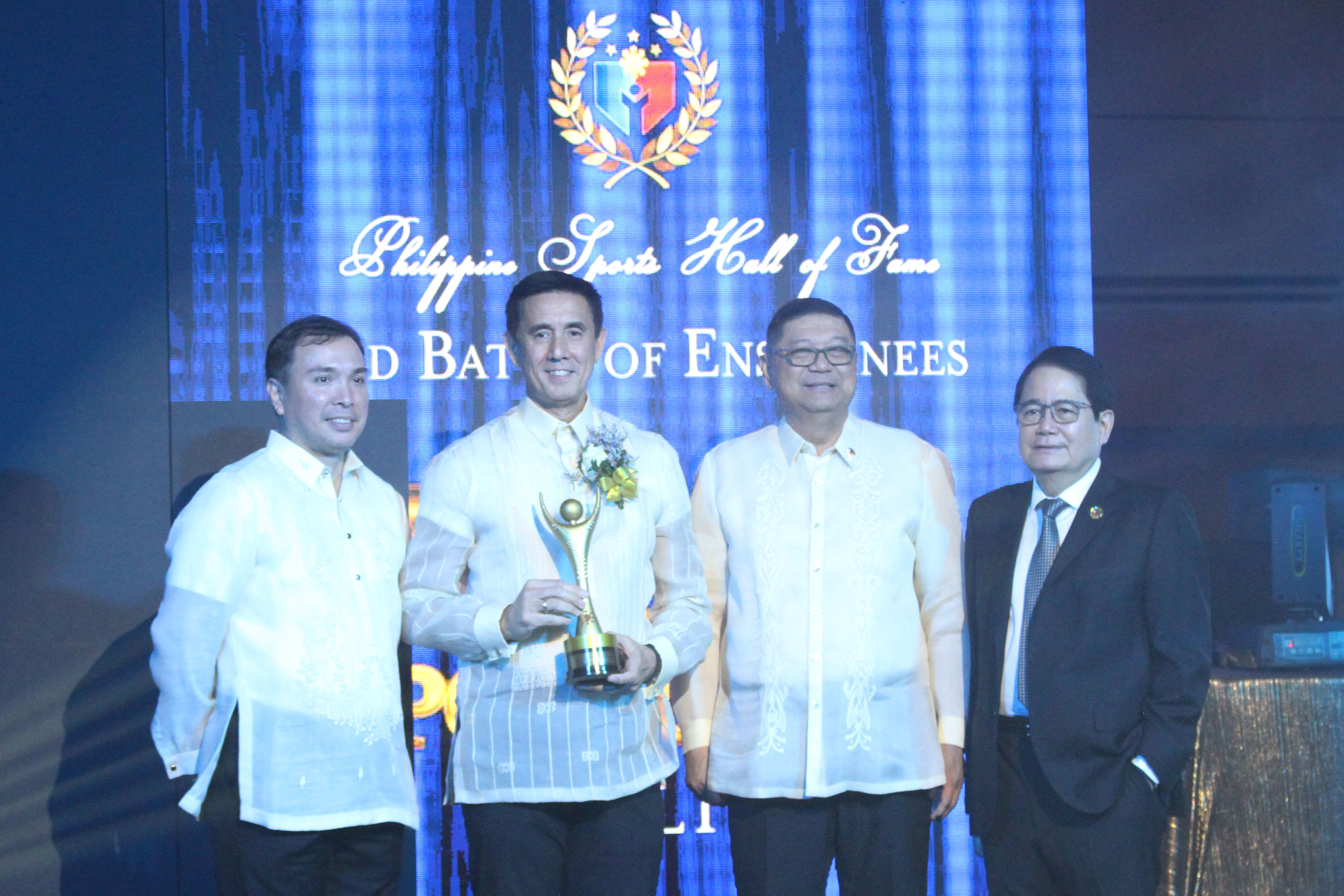
Nepomuceno's induction to the Philippine Sports Hall of Fame in 2019.

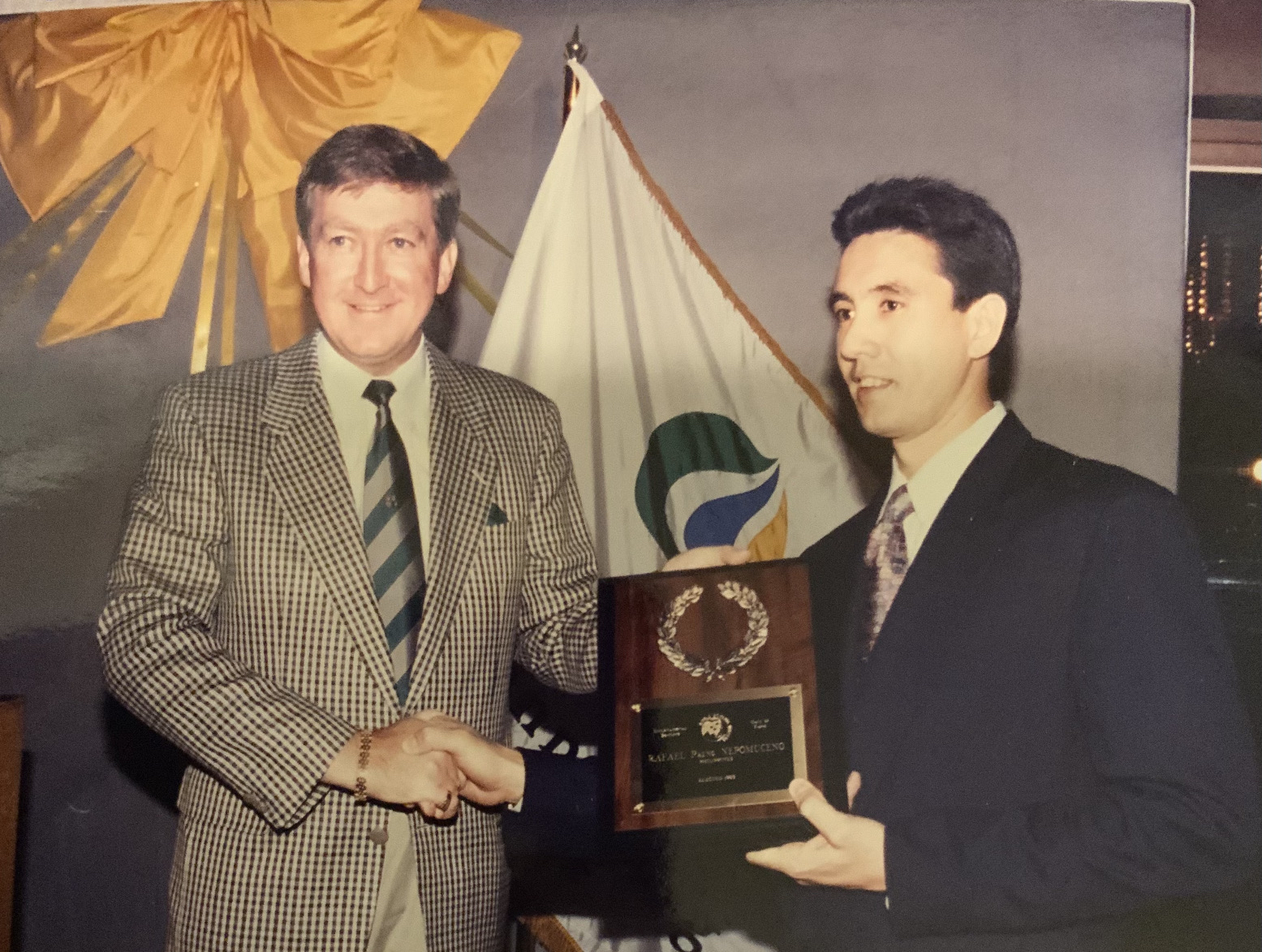
Nepomuceno receives his World Bowling Hall of Fame plaque from Bernard Gibbons in a ceremony in Johannesburg, South Africa 1993.

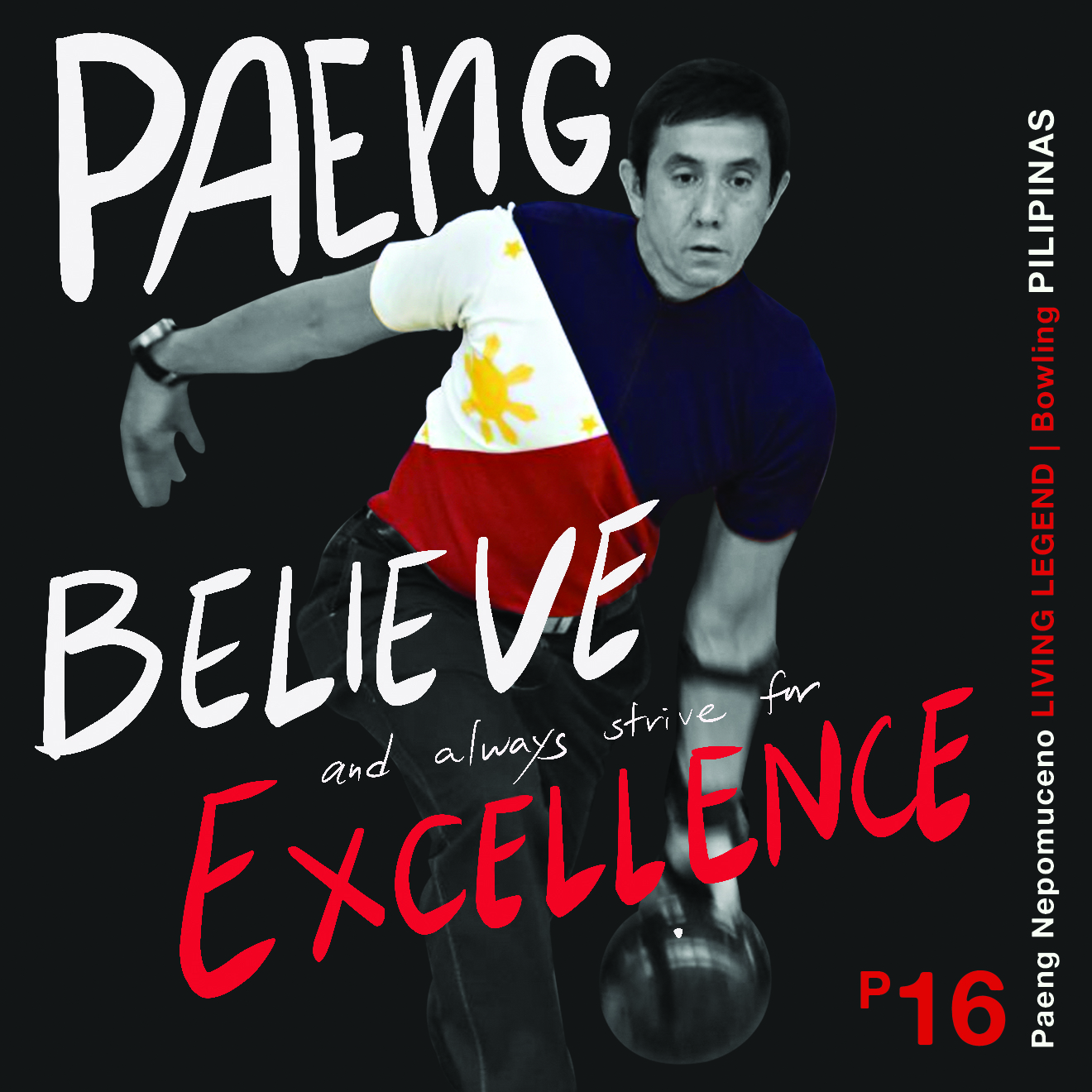
Nepomuceno was honored with a World Renowned Filipino Living Legend commemorative Stamp by Philippine Postal Corporation on November 13, 2021.

Rafael "Paeng" Villareal Nepomuceno (born January 30, 1957) is a Filipino bowler and coach who is a six time World bowling champion. He is a World Bowling Hall of Famer and is the first and only bowling athlete to be awarded with the prestigious IOC (International Olympic Committee) President's Trophy. He was also named International Bowling Athlete of the Millennium by the FIQ (Federation Internationale des Quilleurs) in 1999 and was inducted in the Philippine Sports Hall of Fame in 2018.

Paeng is the first Filipino bowling athlete to be honored with a commemorative stamp when the Philippine Postal corporation issued a World Renowned Filipino Living Legend Stamp bearing his image to celebrate the 75th anniversary of the first Philippine stamp on November 13, 2021.

He has won the World Cup of Bowling four times (1976, 1980, 1992 and 1996). Nepomuceno has also won the World's Invitational Tournament in 1984 and the World Tenpin Masters championship in 1999.

He has been honored by the Guinness World Records FIVE times. His first record was for being the "Youngest Tenpin Bowling World Champion" after winning the 1976 Bowling World Cup at 19 years old in Tehran, then for "The Most wins of the Tenpin Bowling World Cup (1976, 1980, 1992, and 1996)", and for "The Most Tenpin Bowling Titles" with 138 career titles won and he achieved it in Quezon City, Philippines, on 31 August 2026. He has beaten his own record for the most titles in a career worldwide three times. He first established this record in 2007 for winning 118 Career Titles. In 2020 he then again beat his own record after winning a total of 133 career titles. He again rewrote his own record after winning his 138th career title in 2026

Nepomuceno is also a USBC Gold level coach, the only Asian to hold the certification from the United States Bowling Congress. He was named by the Philippine Sportswriters Association the Athlete of the Century in 1999.

The Bowlers Journal International picked Paeng as its Greatest international bowler in its International Edition in September 2004 and also on its November 2013 100-year Anniversary issue.

Paeng at 65 years old rolled his 37th Sanctioned Perfect 300 game at the 24th Sta. Lucia East Bowling Association (SLETBA) Open Masters Finals on October 16, 2022.

== Early life and education ==
Rafael "Paeng" Nepomuceno was born on January 30, 1957, in Quezon City, Philippines to Angel Nepomuceno and Teresa Villareal. Paeng Nepomuceno's father, Angel, is a bowling coach while his mother is a former Miss Philippines (1952). He attended La Salle Green Hills for his elementary and high school studies. He studied in Adamson University for his college education.

== Career ==
=== Competitive career ===
Paeng Nepomuceno was initially into golf at age 10 but later switched to bowling. He got involved in bowling after he and his father sought shelter at the Mile High Bowling Center in Baguio due to rain. He then asked his father to enroll him in a junior league held at Coronado Lanes in Metro Manila.

His first tournament was the Philippine Junior Masters Championship, which he won at age 15. He also won the Philippine International Masters at age 17, becoming the youngest winner of the tournament.

He competed at the Bowling World Cup, becoming the men's champion in four editions (1976, 1980, 1992, and 1996). He was 19 years old when he won the 1976 edition. For this feat he was recognized by Guinness World Records as "youngest tenpin bowling world champion".

Nepomuceno won 9 golds, 5 silvers, and 5 bronze medals in Southeast Asian Games.

He won three gold medals in the 1981 edition which was hosted in Manila. In the 1985 Bangkok Games, he won two Gold medals and a Bronze. He won three gold medals at the 1987 games in Jakarta and one gold medal at the 1991 games in Manila.

He also won the 1984 World Invitational Tournament, a competition held in conjunction with the Summer Olympics held in the same year. Nepomuceno also has represented the Philippines in the World Games winning the two bronze medals in total; in the 1993 and 1997 editions both in the men's single event. He also won the World Tenpin Masters in 1999. That year he suffered a left-hand injury, which required surgery which temporarily sidelined him from bowling.

Nepomuceno was given the Sportsman Award at the 2009 QubicaAMF Bowling World Cup. He is the first Filipino to receive the award.

In 2011, he became the oldest winner of the Philippine International Masters, at age 54. By 2020, he had won 133 career titles, six of which are world titles. His latest title, his 138th, was won at the 2026 PSB Open Bowling Championships Senior Masters on August 31, 2026.

=== Coaching career ===
Nepomuceno joined United States Bowling Congress in 2007 as an International Ambassador to help promote the sport of bowling. In the same year he began aiming to become a USBC certified coach and started training to become a USBC Coaching Level I and Bronze and Silver level Instructor. He hosted seminars discussing coaching and the sport itself. He underwent training the International Training and Research Center in Arlington, Texas, to attain a USBC gold level coaching certification, which he earned by 2013. He received the certification at the World Coaching conference at the USBC headquarters the following year. He is the first and only Asian to attain the certification.

The Philippine Bowling Federation announced on March 21, 2016, that Nepomuceno had been appointed as head coach of the country's national bowlers. Under his watch, Krizziah Tabora became the women's champion of the 2017 QubicaAMF Bowling World Cup.

== Honors ==
=== By world sporting bodies ===
The International Olympic Committee awarded Nepomuceno its highest sports award, the IOC President's Trophy during the term of Juan Antonio Samaranch, in November 1999, in a ceremony in Abu Dhabi. In the same year the Federation Internationale des Quilleurs (FIQ) named him as the "Athlete of the Millennium".

He was the first male bowler to be inducted into the International Bowling Hall of Fame, in 1993. His seven foot image is displayed in front of the entrance of the International Bowling Museum in Arlington, Texas, where the hall of fame is hosted.

=== From the government ===
Nepomuceno has received recognition from the Philippine Presidents for his feats in bowling. Five Philippine presidents have conferred on him orders and medals, including the Presidential Medal of Merit by Ferdinand Marcos, Philippine Legion of Honor by Joseph Estrada, and the Order of Lakandula with Class of Champion for Life by Gloria Macapagal Arroyo. He is the first Filipino athlete to be awarded the Presidential Medal of Merit (1984) and the Philippine Legion of Honor (1999). The other presidents that have honored Paeng are President Corazon C. Aquino and President Fidel V. Ramos.

Both the Philippine Senate and House of Representatives have declared Paeng the "Greatest Philippine Athlete of All Time". He was also named Philippine Athlete of the Century by the Philippine Sportswriters Association in 1999.

=== From sportswriters ===
The Philippine Sportswriters Association recognized Nepomuceno as the Athlete of the Year five times (in 1976, 1980, 1984, 1992, and 1996). The association inducted him to their Hall of Fame in 1997, and in 1999 named him Athlete of the Century and in 2000 he was named among the "Athletes of the Millennium".

The World Bowling Writers awarded him the Mort Luby Jr. Distinguished Service Award. On April 19, 2009, in Barnsley, England. The award is the highest honor given by the World Bowling Writers for lifetime contributions to the sport. He was named World Bowler of the Year three times (1984, 1985, and 1992), and named him to the World Bowling Writers Hall of Fame in 1993 as its first inductee. With this accolade, Nepomuceno became the first and only bowling athlete in the world to have received all major awards and recognitions possible from the World Bowling Writers.

=== Other ===
The Philippine Jaycees gave Nepomuceno a Ten Outstanding Young Men Award in 1978. He was inducted into the De La Salle Alumni Association Sports Hall of Fame in 2003 and was also awarded with the Distinguished Lasallian Award in 2009. He has been part of Adamson University's Hall of Fame since 2012.

He has been honored five times by the Guinness World Records. They recognized him as the "Youngest Tenpin Bowling Champion" by winning the 1976 Bowling World Cup in Tehran, for winning "Most Wins of the Tenpin Bowling World Cup (1976, 1980, 1992, and 1996)", and for "Most Tenpin Bowling Titles" (138 Titles as of 2026 records). He has broken his own record three times. He has now 138 career titles.

== Personal life ==
Paeng Nepomuceno has been married to Saira ("Pinky") Puyat since he was 25. They have a son and two daughters.

Nepomuceno is a physical fitness enthusiast and also participates in runs and lifts weights as cross-training to improve his performance in bowling.

He used to be a professor and a senior lecturer at the University of the Philippines.
