= Sailing at the 1983 SEA Games =

The Sailing at the 1983 Southeast Asian Games was held between 31 May to 4 June at Changi Water Sport Complex.

== Medal summary ==
=== Yachting ===
Event	Gold	Silver	Bronze
Lark	(Singapore) Lock Hong Kit (Singapore) Leow Cheng Hong	(Indonesia) Heryono Soekarno (Indonesia) Sani Hamdani	(Thailand) Vinal Vongtim (Thailand) B. Maneenopaat
470	(Singapore) Khor Chek Leong (Singapore) Siew Shaw Her	(Myanmar) Tun Thein (Myanmar) Than Sein	(Indonesia) Pudji Ganefo Iryanto (Indonesia) Kris Subiantoro
Hobbie 16	(Singapore) Tan Tee Suan (Singapore) Edwin Low	(Thailand) Santi Thamasucharit (Thailand) S. Tipavongse	(Philippines) Vicente Herrera (Philippines) Vivian Veloso
International	(Indonesia) Eddy Sulistyanto	(Malaysia) Tang Wai Chee	(Myanmar) Khin Thein
Maxi Laser	(Singapore) SINGAPORE	(Indonesia) INDONESIA	(Philippines) PHILIPPINES

=== Boardsailing ===
Event	Gold	Silver	Bronze
Windglider	(Philippines) Policarpio Ortega	(Malaysia) Ramli Bain	(Thailand) Bamroong Ruamsap
Mistral	(Thailand) W. Wichithong	(Malaysia) Tan Eng Guan	(Singapore) Ho Kah Soon
Windsurfer	(Thailand) Saard Panyawan	(Singapore) Ramle Mohd Salleh	(Malaysia) Chong Chin Nan

=== Men's Water skiing ===
Event	Gold	Silver	Bronze
Individual	(Indonesia) Fath Daud Wangka	(Philippines) Jaime Legarda	(Philippines) Prospero Olivas
Jumps	(Indonesia) Fath Daud Wangka	(Philippines) Jaime Legarda	(Philippines) Prospero Olivas
Slalom	(Indonesia) Fath Daud Wangka	(Singapore) Jasmin Hussein	(Philippines) Jaime Legarda
Tricks	(Indonesia) Anoy Tulong	(Singapore) William Teo	(Indonesia) Fath Daud Wangka
Mixed Team	(Indonesia) INDONESIA	(Philippines) PHILIPPINES	(Singapore) SINGAPORE (Malaysia) MALAYSIA

=== Women's Water skiing ===
Event	Gold	Silver	Bronze
Individual	(Philippines) Margarita Villareal	(Indonesia) Inawati Setiawan	(Indonesia) Nunik Nudiarty
Jumps	(Philippines) Margarita Villareal	(Indonesia) Inawati Setiawan	(Indonesia) Nunik Nudiarty
Tricks	(Indonesia) Herawati Aisyah	(Indonesia) Inawati Setiawan	(Indonesia) Nunik Nudiarty
Slalom	(Philippines) Margarita Villareal	(Indonesia) Inawati Setiawan	(Philippines) Leobeth Ylaya

== Medal table ==
Rank	Nation	Gold	Silver	Bronze	Total
1	Indonesia (INA)	7	6	5	18
2	Philippines (PHI)	4	3	6	13
3	Singapore (SIN)	4	3	2	9
4	Thailand (THA)	2	1	2	5
5	Malaysia (MAS)	0	3	2	5
6	Myanmar (MYA)	0	1	1	2
Totals (6 entries)		17	17	18	52
