= Rabuan Pit =

Malaysian sprinter

Personal information
- Nationality: Malaysian
- Born: 26 April 1956 (age 70)

Sport
- Country: Malaysia
- Sport: Track and field
- Event: Sprint
Medal record
Men's athletics
Representing Malaysia
Asian Games
Gold medal – first place	1982 New Delhi	100 m
Bronze medal – third place	1982 New Delhi	200 m
Southeast Asian Games
Silver medal – second place	1981 Manila	200m
Silver medal – second place	1981 Manila	400m
Silver medal – second place	1985 Bangkok	200m
Silver medal – second place	1985 Bangkok	4×100m relay
Silver medal – second place	1985 Bangkok	4×400m relay

Rabuan Pit is a Malaysian sprinter from Merlimau, Melaka, Malaysia. He was the Gold medalist in the 100 Metres in the 1982 Asian Games. He was the second Malaysian to do so after Mani Jegathesan.
