= Aquatics at the 1983 SEA Games =

Aquatics at the 1983 Southeast Asian Games included swimming, diving and water polo events. The three sports of aquatics were held at Toa Payoh Swimming Complex, Singapore City, Singapore. Aquatics events was held between 29 May to 3 June.

== Medal winners ==
=== Swimming ===
Men's events

Event	Gold		Silver		Bronze	
100 m freestyle	(Singapore) Ang Peng Siong	53.58 (rec)	(Singapore) Tay Khoon Hean	54.45	(Indonesia) Lukman Niode	54.63
200 m freestyle	(Philippines) William Wilson	1:57.97 (rec)	(Indonesia) Lukman Niode	1:58.18	(Singapore) Tay Khoon Hean	1:59.32
400 m freestyle	(Philippines) William Wilson	4:08.94 (rec)	(Singapore) Soo-Tho Kok Mun	4:16.38	(Philippines) Joselito Andaya	4:18.24
1500 m freestyle	(Philippines) Joselito Andaya	16:50.69	(Singapore) Soo-Tho Kok Mun	17:11.39	(Philippines) William Wilson	17:38.00
100 m backstroke	(Indonesia) Lukman Niode	59.72 (rec)	(Singapore) David Lim	1:01.54	(Philippines) Judy Jaoud	1:03.97
200 m backstroke	(Indonesia) Lukman Niode	2:13.41 (rec)	(Singapore) David Lim	2:14.80	(Philippines) Judy Jaoud	2:19.80
100 m breaststroke	(Philippines) Jairulla Jaitulla	1:08.10 (rec)	(Philippines) Francisco Guanco	1:09.56	(Singapore) Oon Jin Teik	1:10.17
200 m breaststroke	(Philippines) Francisco Guanco	2:29.46 (rec)	(Indonesia) Tjatur Sugiarto	2:33.33	(Philippines) Rene Concepcion	2:34.33
100 m butterfly	(Singapore) Ang Peng Siong	57.87 (rec)	(Singapore) Tay Khoon Hean	59.52	(Indonesia) John Item	60.34
200 m butterfly	(Philippines) William Wilson	2:10.07	(Indonesia) Ridwan Muis	2:12.14	(Philippines) Renato Padronia	2:13.67
400 m individual medley	(Philippines) William Wilson	4:45.72 (rec)	(Philippines) Jairulla Jaitulla	4:50.66	(Singapore) Soo-Tho Kok Mun	4:56.81
4x100 m freestlye relay	Singapore	3:38.42 (rec)	Indonesia	3:43.42	Philippines	3:47.85
4x100 m medley relay	Singapore	4:02.64 (rec)	Indonesia	4:03.62	Philippines	4:09.81
4x200 m freestlye relay	Singapore	8:06.32 (rec)	Philippines	8:06.81	Indonesia	8:13.03

Women's events

Event	Gold		Silver		Bronze	
100 m freestyle	(Singapore) Junie Sng	1:01.77	(Singapore) Chan Mui Pin	1:02.13	(Malaysia) Helen Chow	1:02.57
200 m freestyle	(Singapore) Junie Sng	2:10.31	(Malaysia) May Tan	2:13.36	(Singapore) Chan Mui Pin	2:13.51
400 m freestyle	(Singapore) Junie Sng	4:29.74 (rec)	(Indonesia) Elfira Rosa Nasution	4:38.75	(Singapore) Chan Mui Pin	4:39.28
800 m freestyle	(Singapore) Junie Sng	8:59.46 (rec)	(Malaysia) Katerina Ong	9:33.92	(Indonesia) Elfira Rosa Nasution	9:34.70
100 m backstroke	(Philippines) Christine Jacob	1:10.34	(Singapore) Kwek Leng	1:10.78	(Malaysia) Lai May May	1:10.95
200 m backstroke	(Philippines) Christine Jacob	2:29.00 (rec)	(Singapore) Kwek Leng	2:32.81	(Malaysia) Helen Chow	2:34.82
100 m breaststroke	(Malaysia) Helen Chow	1:18.88	(Malaysia) Ee Yan Hui	1:19.72	(Philippines) Lourdes Samson	1:20.01
200 m breaststroke	(Thailand) Kanogwan Sriprasert	2:25.17	(Singapore) Christina Tham	2:56.93	(Indonesia) Sandra Melani Maksudi	2:57.35
100 m buttertfly	(Singapore) Junie Sng	1:05.32 (rec)	(Malaysia) Helen Chow	1:06.40	(Malaysia) May Tan	1:06.86
200 m butterfly	(Singapore) Junie Sng	2:20.35 (rec)	(Singapore) Mavis Ee	2:24.54	(Indonesia) Selowati Hadi Sujono	2:28.22
400 m butterfly	(Singapore) Junie Sng	4:29.74 (rec)	(Indonesia) Elfira Rosa Nasution	4:38.75	(Malaysia) Katerina Ong	4:39.28
400 m individual medley	(Singapore) Junie Sng	5:04.37 (rec)	(Indonesia) Elfira Rosa Nasution	5:30.11	(Thailand) Pasawan Phantumabumroong	5:38.97
4x100 m freestlye relay	Singapore	4:11.21 (rec)	Philippines; Thailand	4:15.29		
4x100 m medley relay	Singapore	4:39.12 (rec)	Malaysia	4:41.84	Philippines	4:46.89

=== Water polo ===
Event	Gold	Silver	Bronze
Men's	Singapore	Malaysia	Indonesia

=== Diving ===
Event	Gold		Silver		Bronze	
Men's springboard	(Indonesia) Kristiadi Permana	490.85	(Thailand) Sangwal Foungdee	454.70	(Indonesia) Haryo Ramayana	398.45
Men's placing	(Thailand) Somchai Ongkasing (Malaysia) Ong Ka Sing	158.25	(Singapore) Leong Siet Fong	156.35	(Singapore) Richard Tham	155.85
Men's platform diving	(Thailand) Somchai Ongkasing	453.55	(Indonesia) Eko Setiadi	440.65	(Singapore) Richard Tham	415.60
Women's springboard	(Indonesia) Indah Siantiningsih	308.80	(Indonesia) Dwi Setyowati	294.86		
Women's placing	(Indonesia) Indah Siantiningsih	167	(Indonesia) Dwi Setyowati	166	(Singapore) Lee Po Ling	159.45
Women's springboard diving	(Indonesia) Indah Siantiningsih	373	(Indonesia) Dwi Setyowati	331.50	(Singapore) Lee Po Ling	322

== Medal table ==
Rank	Nation	Gold	Silver	Bronze	Total
1	Singapore (SIN)	16	12	9	37
2	Philippines (PHI)	9	4	10	23
3	Indonesia (INA)	6	12	8	26
4	Thailand (THA)	3	2	1	6
5	Malaysia (MAS)	2	6	5	13
Totals (5 entries)		36	36	33	105
