= Here Comes the Bride =

Here Comes the Bride may refer to:

== Music ==
- Bridal Chorus, the standard march played for the bride's entrance at some weddings
- Here Comes the Bride (album), a 1999 album by Spin Doctors

== Film and television ==
- Here Comes the Bride (1919 film), an American silent comedy
- Here Comes the Bride (2010 film), a Filipino comedy
- Here Comes the Bride (TV series), a 2007 Filipino reality series
- "Here Comes the Bride" (The Honeymooners), a 1956 TV episode
- "Here Comes the Bride" (RuPaul's Drag Race), a 2010 TV episode

== See also ==
- Here Comes the Bride, My Mom!, a 2010 Japanese film
- Here Come the Brides, a 1968–1970 American television series
- Here Come the Brides (album), a 2004 album by Brides of Destruction
