= Batulamai Rajakumar =

Malaysian middle-distance runner

Personal information
- Nationality: Malaysian
- Born: 10 December 1964 (age 61) Malaysia
- Height: 170 cm (5 ft 7 in)
- Weight: 59 kg (130 lb)

Sport
- Country: Malaysia
- Sport: Middle-distance running

Batulamai Rajakumar is a Malaysian Olympic middle-distance runner. He represented his country in the men's 1500 meters and the men's 800 meters at the 1984 Summer Olympics. His time was a 3:55.19 in the 1500, and a 1:48.19 in the 800 heats.
