= Here Comes the Bride (TV series) =

2007 Philippine television reality show

- Title card
- Genre: Reality show
- Presented by: Christine Jacob
- Country of origin: Philippines
- Original language: Tagalog

Production
- Camera setup: Multiple-camera setup
- Running time: 60 minutes

Original release
- Network: Q
- Release: March 22 – June 28, 2007

Here Comes the Bride is a 2007 Philippine television reality show broadcast by Q. Hosted by Christine Jacob, it premiered on March 22, 2007. The show concluded on June 28, 2007.

== Accolades ==
Accolades received by Here Comes the Bride
| Year | Award | Category | Recipient | Result | Ref. |
|---|---|---|---|---|---|
| 2007 | 21st PMPC Star Awards for Television | Best Reality Competition Program | Here Comes the Bride | Won | |
| 2007 | 21st PMPC Star Awards for Television | Best Reality Competition Program Host | Christine Jacob | Won | |
