= Thomas Lim =

Thomas Lim (Traditional Chinese: 林毅煒) is Head of Sun Entertainment Culture Los Angeles and a prominent filmmaker in the Macau film industry, originally of Chinese Singaporean descent. He is best known for directing and writing the Macau movie Roulette City, which was commercially released in theaters in Japan and Singapore in 2012, and Macau in 2014. Lim is also known as an actor in leading roles in Chinese TV drama series such as The Game, musicals like The Wizard of Oz (as the Cowardly Lion), and movies like Hong Kong's One Last Dance.

In 2016, Lim began production of his new directorial feature film Sea of Mirrors in Macau. Shot on the iPhone, principal photography was completed in Los Angeles in the summer of 2017. The film stars Toru Uchikado (from NBC serial drama series "Heroes Reborn") and Japanese actress Kieko Suzuki. News of the production were widely reported by all major Macau press: such as the Macao Daily News, The Macau Post Daily, Macau Daily Times, Hoje Macau, Jornal Tribuna de Macau, Macau Closer, Va Kio Daily, M-Art and TDM TV station. The film premiered in Macau on May-24, 2019. Lim is reported to be planning a third feature film to complete a planned trilogy of films set in Macau.

== Career ==
=== China ===
In 2004, Lim moved to Beijing, China, and became a TV and film actor for both American and Chinese productions. He played a principal role "Zhou Fan" in the Chinese TV Series The Game, which aired nationwide in Mainland China, Singapore, Malaysia and Vietnam.

=== Macau ===
Lim moved to Macau in 2008 where he wrote and directed the feature film Roulette City. The film premiered at the Singapore International Film Festival , and was commercially released at cinemas in Japan , Singapore and Macau. The film also aired as a 2013 Chinese New Year film at primetime on Macau Cable TV These releases garnered Lim over 100 press interviews and articles in Japan, Singapore, Macau, Taiwan, and the U.S.

Lim has spoken in interviews about making independent films in Asia, saying: "I personally think the word 'passion' is overrated when it comes to describing filmmakers. Many passionate people end up just talking about what their goals are, but it's the tenacious ones that get things done and make progress."

In 2014, Lim was dubbed "An Ambassador for Local Films" by Macau Closer magazine.

=== Japan ===
Following the release of Roulette City in Japan, Lim began residing in Tokyo, where he made the short films Mari and The Last Room.

Mari is a film about the struggles of single mothers in Japan. When describing his inspirations for the film, he explains: "People don't usually associate Japan with being poor. But upon further research, I learned that two groups of people fell under the country's poverty line in Japan: the net cafe dwellers, and single mothers. I was shocked to discover that there are more than 1 million single mothers in Japan, and even thought it was a typo."

The Last Room is Lim's first attempt at directing a horror project.

=== Los Angeles ===
Roulette City was invited to screen at the University of Southern California in Los Angeles on January 23, 2015 and February 4, 2016. Scenes from the film were included as part of USC's curriculum and final exams in 2016.

Speaking on his move to Los Angeles, Lim states: "If I can make Hollywood films, kids in Macau and my native Singapore will forever be allowed to take their Hollywood dreams seriously. It was something I didn't have as a child." Lim became Head of Sun Entertainment Culture Los Angeles (head office in Hong Kong) in September 2018.

== Filmography ==
Year	Film	Role
2019	Sea of Mirrors	Director-Writer-Producer
2017	Mari	Director-Writer-Producer
2017	The Last Room	Director-Writer-Producer
2015	Returnees	Director-Writer-Producer
2012	Roulette City	Director-Writer-Producer
2011	Incredible Tales	Actor
2008	Foreign Devils	Actor
2008	The Game	Actor
2007	Marco Polo	Actor
2006	Last Seen At Angkor	Actor-Producer
2006	Watch Me	Actor
2006	Son of the Dragon	Actor
2006	One Last Dance	Actor
