= Jaree Patarach =

Thai sprinter

Personal information
- Nationality: Thai
- Born: 13 May 1957 (age 69)

Sport
- Sport: Sprinting
- Event: 4 × 100 metres relay
Medal record
Women's athletics
Representing Thailand
Asian Championships
Gold medal – first place	1983 Kuwait City	4×100 m
Gold medal – first place	1985 Jakarta	4×100 m

Jaree Patarach (born 13 May 1957) is a Thai sprinter. She competed in the women's 4 × 100 metres relay at the 1984 Summer Olympics.
