= Adelene Wee =

Singaporean bowler

Adelene Wee (born 1965) is a retired Singaporean bowling champion. She was the youngest winner, and the first Singaporean person to win the title of World Champion at the World Games.

== Biography ==
Wee was born in 1965 to a large family with six other brothers and sisters. Wee started bowling at age 12. Her father and two of her brothers were also bowlers and they took her with them to the bowling alley.

Wee at fifteen, was the youngest gold medal winner of the Philippines Women's Open Masters in 1981. The next year, she broke the world record for six-game singles in ten-pin bowling at the Sukhumvit Open and won the Singapore International Bowling Championships. In June 1985, she won three gold medals at the Asian FIQ youth championships.

Wee and Al Dy were the two athletes sent to compete in bowling from Singapore at the 1985 World Games. Wee and Dy performed in mixed doubles and singles competitions. Nineteen-year-old Wee won the games for bowling, becoming the first world champion from Singapore and the world's youngest to win at the games. Wee faced competitors from 23 other countries and won with a 200-plus average. She performed despite having a hamstring injury at the time. When she returned to Singapore, she was welcomed warmly at the airport by fans, friends and family.

Wee has a lifetime membership at all bowling centres. She retired from bowling competitively in 1993. After retirement, she worked as an insurance agent and sports therapist and volunteers at a Christian church. She was inducted into the Singapore Women's Hall of Fame in 2014.
