= Football at the 1985 SEA Games =

1985 SEA Games Football
Tournament details
- Host country: Thailand
- Dates: 8–18 December
- Teams: 6
- Venue: 1 (in 1 host city)

Final positions
- Champions: Thailand (5th title)
- Runners-up: Singapore
- Third place: Malaysia
- Fourth place: Indonesia

Tournament statistics
- Matches played: 10
- Goals scored: 35 (3.5 per match)

Football was contested as part of the programme for the 1985 Southeast Asian Games which was hosted in Bangkok, Thailand from 8 to 17 December 1985. It was the 13th edition of the men's football tournament and the inaugural edition of the women's tournament at the multi-sport event organised by the SEA Games Federation Committee.

The men's football tournament began with the first matches of the group stage on 8 December 1985 and ended with the gold medal match on 15 December 1985. Two-time defending champions Thailand and Singapore contested the final. Thailand defeated Singapore 2–0 to win the gold medal. In the bronze medal match, Malaysia defeated Indonesia 1–0.

The women's football tournament began with the first match of the group stage on 9 December 1985 and ended with the final match of the group stage on 13 December 1985. At the end of the round-robin tournament, Thailand won the gold medal, Singapore won silver and the Philippines won the bronze medal.

== Background ==
Football had been part of the Southeast Asian Games programme following the debut of the men's competition at the inaugural 1959 SEAP Games in Thailand. No women's competition had previously been held. Thailand were two-time defending champions of the men's competition after defeating Singapore 2–1 in the gold medal match at the previous edition in 1983. Burma were the most successful team having won the gold medal five times previously.

Burma were due to compete but withdrew from the football tournament and three other sports before the competition began.

== Venue ==
Matches were played at the National Stadium in Bangkok, Thailand.

== Men's tournament ==
=== Format ===
In total, six teams took part in the competition. They were drawn into two single round robin groups of three teams. The winners and runners-up would then contest the semi-finals which would decide the teams contesting the gold and bronze medal matches.

==== Participants ====
- Brunei
- ~~Burma~~
- Indonesia
- Malaysia
- Philippines
- Singapore
- Thailand

=== Group stage ===
==== Group A ====
Singapore and Indonesia advanced to the semi-finals.

===== Table =====
Pos	Team	Pld	W	D	L	GF	GA	GD	Pts	Qualification
1	Singapore	2	2	0	0	4	0	+4	4	Advance to semi-finals
2	Indonesia	2	0	1	1	1	2	−1	1	Advance to semi-finals
3	Brunei	2	0	1	1	1	4	−3	1	

===== Matches =====
9 December 1985

Indonesia	0–1	Singapore

National Stadium, Bangkok

11 December 1985

Brunei	1–1	Indonesia

National Stadium, Bangkok

13 December 1985

Singapore	3–0	Brunei

National Stadium, Bangkok

==== Group B ====
Thailand and Malaysia advanced to the semi-finals.

===== Table =====
Pos	Team	Pld	W	D	L	GF	GA	GD	Pts	Qualification
1	Thailand	2	1	1	0	8	1	+7	3	Advance to semi-finals
2	Malaysia	2	1	1	0	7	1	+6	3	Advance to semi-finals
3	Philippines	2	0	0	2	0	13	−13	0	
4	Burma	0	0	0	0	0	0	0	0	Withdrew

===== Matches =====
8 December 1985

Thailand	1–1	Malaysia

National Stadium, Bangkok

10 December 1985

Malaysia	6–0	Philippines

National Stadium, Bangkok

12 December 1985

Thailand	7–0	Philippines

National Stadium, Bangkok

=== Semi-finals ===
Singapore defeated Malaysia on penalties and Thailand defeated Indonesia to advance to the gold medal match.

15 December 1985

Singapore	2–2 (a.e.t.)	Malaysia
Penalties
	6–5

National Stadium, Bangkok

15 December 1985

Thailand	7–0	Indonesia

National Stadium, Bangkok

=== Bronze medal match ===
Malaysia defeated Indonesia to win the bronze medal.

16 December 1985

Malaysia	1–0	Indonesia

National Stadium, Bangkok

=== Gold medal match ===
Thailand defeated Singapore to win the gold medal.

18 December 1985

Thailand	2–0	Singapore

National Stadium, Bangkok

== Women's tournament ==
=== Format ===
In total, three teams took part in the competition. They contested a single round robin group to decide the winners of the gold, silver and bronze medals.

==== Participants ====
- Philippines
- Singapore
- Thailand

=== Summary ===
In the opening match on 9 December 1985, Thailand defeated the Philippines 4–0. Two days later, the Philippines were confirmed as bronze medalists after losing 2–0 to Singapore in their final game. On 13 December, Thailand defeated Singapore 6–0 in the final and ultimately decisive match to win the gold medal.

=== Table ===
Pos	Team	Pld	W	D	L	GF	GA	GD	Pts	Final Result
1	Thailand	2	2	0	0	10	0	+10	4	Gold medal
2	Singapore	2	1	0	1	2	6	−4	2	Silver medal
3	Philippines	2	0	0	2	0	6	−6	0	Bronze medal

=== Matches ===
9 December 1985

Thailand	4–0	Philippines

National Stadium, Bangkok

11 December 1985

Singapore	2–0	Philippines

National Stadium, Bangkok

13 December 1985

Thailand	6–0	Singapore

National Stadium, Bangkok
