= Christine Jacob =

Filipina television personality

- Born: Christine Marie Sotto Jacob; April 30, 1967 (age 59); Manila, Philippines
- Other name: Christine Jacob-Sandejas
- Occupations: Television host; journalist; actress
- Years active: 1990–present
- Spouse: Francisco Sandejas
- Children: 5
- Sports career
- National team: Philippines
- Height: 1.66 m (5 ft 5 in)
- Sport: Swimming
- Strokes: Backstroke
Medal record
Women's swimming
Representing Philippines
Southeast Asian Games
Gold medal – first place	Singapore 1983	100 m backstroke
Gold medal – first place	Singapore 1983	200 m backstroke
Silver medal – second place	Singapore 1983	4×100 m freestyle
Silver medal – second place	Bangkok 1985	100 m backstroke
Silver medal – second place	Bangkok 1985	200 m backstroke
Silver medal – second place	Bangkok 1985	4×100 m freestyle
Bronze medal – third place	Manila 1981	100 m freestyle
Bronze medal – third place	Manila 1981	4×100 m freestyle
Bronze medal – third place	Singapore 1983	4×100 m medley
Bronze medal – third place	Bangkok 1985	4×100 m medley

Christine Sotto Jacob-Sandejas (born April 30, 1967) is a Filipino television host, newscaster, actress, and former competitive swimmer.

== Early life ==
She was born in Manila to a German American father George Jacob and a former TV host Rosemarie (née Sotto), and grew up in the United States in her elementary years.

== Biography ==
She and her family returned to the Philippines in the 1980s. She joined Southeast Asian Games in Singapore in 1983 where she won a gold medal. Jacob then competed in the swimming competition in the 1984 Summer Olympics.

After joining athletics, she was requested by her aunt to co-host in Eat Bulaga! in 1990 (then airing on ABS-CBN). She became a newscaster for PTV while hosting Eat Bulaga!, where she had a short-lived relationship with the main host Vic Sotto (no blood relationship to Jacob's mother). After her contract with APT Entertainment and TAPE Inc. (then-producer of Eat Bulaga!) expired, Jacob hosted its rival, Magandang Tanghali Bayan, on ABS-CBN.

She stopped hosting in 2001 when she became pregnant with her first child with her husband, Francisco "Paco" Sandejas, the brother of Manu Sandejas (Agot Isidro's ex-husband). After four years, GMA Network gave her her own TV show, Mobile Kusina. This ended in early 2007.

Currently, she is working as a journalist of NewsWatch Plus on both RPTV and its half-sister channel Aliw Channel 23.

== Filmography ==
=== Film ===
- 1991: Rocky Plus V as Lorna
- 1991: Sam & Miguel (Your Basura, No Problema) as Lydia
- 1993: Kuya Kong Siga as Jessica
- 1996: Enteng and the Shaolin Kid as News Anchor
- 1997: Babae as a student

=== Television ===
Year	Title
1990–1995	News on 4
1991–1998; 2023–2025	Eat Bulaga!
1995–1997	GMA Supershow
1996–1997	Miss Asia Pacific International
1998–2001	Magandang Tanghali Bayan
2005–2007	Mobile Kusina
2007	Here Comes the Bride
2009–2012	Full Time Moms
2012	Game
2015–2017	Real Talk
2017–2024	New Day
2018–2024	Wholesome Meals, Better Life
2024–present	NewsWatch Plus

== Awards ==
- 1991 PMPC Star Awards for Television "Best New TV Personality" (Eat Bulaga! / ABS-CBN 2)
- 2006 PMPC Star Awards for Television "Best Educational Show Host" (Mobile Kusina / GMA 7)

== See also ==
- List of Filipino sportspeople
