= Athletics at the 1985 SEA Games =

The athletics competition at the 1985 SEA Games was held at the Suphachalasai Stadium, Bangkok, Thailand between December 11 to December 15.

== Medal summary ==
=== Men ===
Event	Gold		Silver		Bronze	
100 m	(Indonesia) Christian Nenepath	10.54	(Thailand) Sumet Promna	10.54	(Indonesia) Prunomo	10.62
200 m	(Indonesia) Mohamed Purnomo	21.25	(Malaysia) Rabuan Pit	21.33	(Malaysia) Sivaling Govindasamy	21.88
400 m	(Malaysia) Nordin Mohamed Jadi	47.18	(Philippines) Romeo Gido	47.50	(Indonesia) I. Wayan Budi A.	48.03
800 m	(Malaysia) Haridas Ramasymy	1:49.24	(Thailand) Chern Srijudanu	1:50.74	(Indonesia) Dominggus Lutrun	1:52.04
1500 m	(Malaysia) Muthiah Sivalingam	3:49.37	(Thailand) Chern Srijudanu	3:51.37	(Myanmar) Shwe Aung	3:51.73
5000 m	(Philippines) Hector Begeo	14:22.28	(Indonesia) Edwardus Nabunome	14:29.40	(Malaysia) G. Krishnan	14:41.45
10,000 m	(Philippines) Mario Castro	30:51.80	(Malaysia) G. Krishnan	30:58.90	(Myanmar) Dharamann	31:51.90
110 m hurdles	(Malaysia) Nasir Mohd Hanafiah	14.65	(Indonesia) Prayogo Hero	14.66	(Indonesia) Sunardi Fauzan	14.89
400 m hurdles	(Philippines) Leopoldo Arnillo	52.20	(Thailand) Aranyakanont K.	52.53	(Thailand) Chanont Kenchan	53.15
3000 m steeplechase	(Philippines) Hector Begeo	9:02.25	(Indonesia) Salam Abdul	9:15.92	(Malaysia) Ramakrishnan M.	9:17.87
4 x 100 m relay	Indonesia Purnomo; Christian Nenepath; Ernawan Witarsa; Yulius Afaar	40.48	Malaysia Rabuan Pit; Sivaling Govindasamy; Nordin Mohamed Jadi; Nasir Mohd Hanafiah	41.08	Philippines Jeremias Marques; Esmelado Punelas; Roel Pelosis; Raul Abangan	41.82
4 x 400 m relay	Philippines Marlon Pagalilavan; Romeo Gido; Honesto Larce; Isidro del Prado	3:06.58 NR	Malaysia Joseph Phan; Sambasivam Murugan; Rabuan Pit; Nordin Mohamed Jadi	3:09.39	Indonesia Ahlil; Slamet Widodo; Elieser Watubosi; I. Wayan Budi A.	3:10.69
Marathon	(Indonesia) Ali Sofyan Siregar	2.25:52	(Indonesia) Sudarsono Gatot	2.26:45	(Thailand) Chanpongsri S.	2.30:29
10 km walk	(Malaysia) Subramania Vellasamy	45:27.24	(Myanmar) Apparao	45:28.57	(Myanmar) Myint Lwin	47:06.47
Long jump	(Malaysia) Nasir Mohd Hanafiah	7.59	(Philippines) Alex Ligtas	7.43	(Indonesia) Marwoto	7.28
High jump	(Malaysia) Nairu Lal Ramjit	2.07	(Philippines) Luis Juico	2.07	(Malaysia) Lou Cwee Peng	2.03
Triple jump	(Thailand) Thaveechalermdit S.	15.39	(Indonesia) Mochtar	14.93	(Thailand) Natte Kamwatanaphant	14.74
Pole vault	(Myanmar) Soe Myint Aung	4.60	(Indonesia) Wocono Hadi	4.50	(Singapore) Chan Chin Wah (Singapore) Ng Kean Mun	4.45
Shot put	(Thailand) Bancha Supanroj	15.20	(Malaysia) Arjan Singh	14.36	(Philippines) Vidal Ferraren	14.26
Discus throw	(Thailand) Adul Kerdsri	46.48	(Thailand) Surichai Puthisen	45.42	(Indonesia) Geraldus Balagaise	43.70
Javelin throw	(Indonesia) Frans Mahuse	71.60	(Indonesia) Timotius S Ndiken	71.26	(Thailand) Perch Jordee	70.54
Hammer throw	(Malaysia) Dhaliwal Samreet S.	49.04	(Philippines) Danilo Jarina	48.98	(Indonesia) Darma Budi	45.88
Decathlon	(Indonesia) Julius Uwe	6746	(Thailand) Thavorn Phanreong	6728	(Myanmar) Soe Myint Aung	6512

=== Women ===
Event	Gold		Silver		Bronze	
100 m	(Thailand) Walapa Tangjitsusorn	11.72	(Thailand) Ratjai Sripet	11.77	(Indonesia) Henny Maspaitella	11.88
200 m	(Thailand) Ratjai Sripet	24.28	(Thailand) Rewwadee Srithoa	24.30	(Philippines) Elena Ganosa	24.49
400 m	(Thailand) Rewwadee Srithao	54.14	(Myanmar) Thin Thin Maw	54.70	(Thailand) Somsri Chinnook	54.90
800 m	(Thailand) Sasithorn Chantanuhong	2:03.75	(Thailand) Pranee Boonying	2:06.95	(Philippines) Nenita Dungca	2:07.01 (NR)
1500 m	(Thailand) Sasithorn Chantanuhong	4:22.58	(Myanmar) Mar Mar Min	4:22.65	(Myanmar) Khin Khin Htwe	4:31.26
3000 m	(Myanmar) Khin Khin Htwe	9:33.06	(Myanmar) Mar Mar Min	9:37.01	(Indonesia) Maria Aibekop	10:27.04
100 m hurdles	(Philippines) Agrifina Dela Cruz	14.09	(Myanmar) Aye Aye Maw	14.47	(Thailand) Tassanee Plathip	14.77
400 m hurdles	(Philippines) Agrifina Dela Croz	59.29	(Indonesia) Martha Lekransy	1:00.39	(Thailand) Wasana Thimwat	1:01.01
4 × 100 m relay	Thailand Walapa Tangjitsusorn; Ratjai Sripet; Rewwadee Srithoa; Wanna Popirom	45.55	Indonesia Henny Maspaitella; Budi Nurani Soekidi; Rosa Erari; Emma Tahapary	46.46	Malaysia Mumtaz Jaaffar; Sajarutuldur Hamzah; Anita Ali; Kaur Harbans	47.80
4 × 400 m relay	Thailand Somsri Chinnook; Walapa Tangjitnusorn; Chantanuhong S. Rewwadee Srithao	3:39.18	Indonesia Rosa Erari; Emma Tahapary; Wahyudi Indah; Martha Lekransy	3:43.76	Myanmar Mar Mar Oo; Myint Myint Than; Ma Aung Kyi; Thin Thin Maw	3:44.75
Marathon	(Myanmar) Weik Pan	2:57.32	(Indonesia) Tan Siu Chen	3:01.51	(Indonesia) Maria Lawalata	3:11.15
5 km walk	(Indonesia) Ice Magdalena	24:34.10	(Myanmar) Win Win	25:57.59	(Indonesia) Hasiaty	27:18.26
Long jump	(Philippines) Elma Muros	6.11 m	(Thailand) Arunee Supaluek	5.68 m	(Myanmar) San San Aye	5.64 m
High jump	(Myanmar) San San Aye	1.68 m	(Malaysia) Wong Leh King	1.68 m	(Thailand) Vannipa Yeepracha	1.65 m
Shot put	(Indonesia) Josephina Mahuse	13.68 m	(Myanmar) Jennifer Tinlay	13.16 m	(Thailand) Sathit Peunsen	11.83 m
Discus throw	(Indonesia) Juliana Effendy	45.98 m	(Myanmar) Jennifer Tinlay	43.18 m	(Philippines) Dorie Cortejo	42.96 m
Javelin throw	(Philippines) Erlinda Lavandia	47.96 m	(Thailand) Pulsap Plupplee	45.18 m	(Thailand) Sathit Peunsen	38.54 m
Heptathlon	(Philippines) Nene Gamo	4603	(Thailand) Wathaporn Somboon	3962	(Malaysia) Wong Leh King	3866

== Medal table ==
Rank	Nation	Gold	Silver	Bronze	Total
1	Thailand (THA)	10	12	10	32
2	Philippines (PHI)	10	4	5	19
3	Indonesia (INA)	9	12	12	33
4	Malaysia (MAS)	8	6	6	20
5	Myanmar (MYA)	4	7	7	18
6	Singapore (SIN)	0	0	2	2
Totals (6 entries)		41	41	42	124
