= Boxing at the 1985 SEA Games =

Boxing competitions

The Boxing at the 1985 SEA Games was held at the Nimibutr Gymnasium in the National Sport Complex, Bangkok, Thailand. the Boxing was held between December 12 to December 16.

== Medals by event ==
Event	Gold	Silver	Bronze
Men's -45 kg.	(Thailand) Teerachai Semanuson	(Indonesia) Nico Thomas	(Malaysia) Yahaya Bin Mohd Shad (Philippines) Nelson Jamili
Men's -48 kg.	(Philippines) Leopoldo Serantes	(Thailand) Supab Boonrowd	(Myanmar) San Hla (Indonesia) Herry Maitimu
Men's -51 kg.	(Thailand) Khunchai Sumranjit	(Philippines) Orlando Tacuyan	(Singapore) Neo Oon Heng (Myanmar) Myint Soe Lay
Men's -54 kg.	(Indonesia) Adrianus Taroreh	(Thailand) Kumncun Janpeng	(Brunei) PG. Haji Mohiddin AK. (Myanmar) Saw Tin Myint
Men's -57 kg.	(Thailand) Wanchai Pongsri	(Indonesia) Matheos Lewaherilla	(Myanmar) Tun Tun Win (Singapore) Tan Leong Kok
Men's -60 kg.	(Thailand) Somsak Boonta	(Philippines) Ruben Mares	(Brunei) Haji Piut Abu Bakar (Indonesia) Apeles Letty
Men's -63.5 kg.	(Thailand) Sambouy Mongsoni	(Indonesia) Manimbul Silaban	(Malaysia) Hussin Abd Rahman (Myanmar) Myo Kyaw
Men's -67 kg.	(Singapore) Mohamed Mukhlis	(Thailand) Taweewat Islam	(Philippines) Alfredo Trazona (Indonesia) Velentino
Men's -71 kg.	(Thailand) Boontum Silakorn	(Philippines) Ernesto Coronel	(Myanmar) Soe Soe (Malaysia) Md Saman Yaacoap
Men's -75 kg.	(Thailand) Narong Intaprom	(Indonesia) Jonas Giay	(Brunei) MD Ali Ismail (Philippines) Ramon Napagao
Men's -81 kg.	(Indonesia) Liston Siregar	(Thailand) Anant Inkankate	(Malaysia) Hock Singh Amarjit -
Men's -91 kg.	(Thailand) Samrouy Sukeetan	(Indonesia) Lodwyk Akwan	(Singapore) Ong Poh Chye -
Men's +91 kg.	(Thailand) Panya Sonnoi	(Singapore) Mohamed Ismail	- -
