= Basketball at the 1985 SEA Games =

5th SEA Games Basketball Tournament
- Bangkok 1985

Tournament details
- SEA Games: 1985 SEA Games
- Host nation: Thailand
- City: Bangkok
- Venue: Thai-Japanese Bangkok Youth Center
- Duration: 9–16 December

Men's tournament
Medals
Gold medalists	Philippines
Silver medalists	Malaysia
Bronze medalists	Thailand

Women's tournament
Medals
Gold medalists	Malaysia
Silver medalists	Philippines
Bronze medalists	Singapore

Tournaments
← Singapore 1983	Jakarta 1987 →

The Basketball at the 1985 SEA Games was held at the Gymnasium in the Bangkok Youth Centre, Bangkok, Thailand between December 9 to December 16.

== Medals by event ==
Event	Gold	Silver	Bronze
Men's Team	Philippines	Malaysia	Thailand
Women's Team	Malaysia	Philippines	Singapore
