= Nordin Mohamed Jadi =

Malaysian track runner and athlete

Personal information
- Born: Nordin Mohamed Jadi; 12 May 1962 (age 64) Muar, Johor
- Height: 1.70 m (5 ft 7 in)
- Weight: 62 kg (137 lb)

Sport
- Country: Malaysia
Medal record
Men's athletics
Representing Malaysia
Asian Championships
Bronze medal – third place	1991 Kuala Lumpur	4×400 m

Nordin Mohd Jadi (born 12 May 1962 in Muar, Johor, Malaysia) is a former Malaysia track runner and athlete who represented Malaysia in many international and regional events and championships in the 1980s. His favourite athletic events were the 200 metre and 400 metre track events.

== Achievement in Olympic Games ==
Nordin represented Malaysia in the 1984 Summer Olympics in Los Angeles and the 1988 Summer Olympics in Seoul. His personal best for the 200m event was 21.4 seconds, made in 1983. For the 400m event it was 46.56 seconds, made in 1987.

Nordin Jadi was also the flag bearer for the Malaysia contingent during the march past in the opening ceremony of the Seoul, 1988 Summer Olympic Games.

== See also ==
- Malaysia at the 1984 Summer Olympics
- Athletics at the 1984 Summer Olympics – Men's 200 metres Qualifying Heats 2 – Rank 5 – Nordin Mohamed Jadi – 21.88
- Athletics at the 1984 Summer Olympics – Men's 400 metres Preliminary Heats 2 – Rank 5 – Nordin Jadi – 47.12
- Athletics at the 1985 Southeast Asian Games – Medals by event – Athletic – Men 400m – Gold
- Muar – Notable and Famous Prominent Persons from Muar – Sportspersons
