= 1985 SEA Games =

Multi-sport event in Bangkok, Thailand

13th Southeast Asian Games
- Host city: Bangkok, Thailand
- Nations: 8
- Sport: 18
- Opening: 8 December 1985
- Closing: 17 December 1985
- Opened by: Bhumibol Adulyadej; King of Thailand
- Closed by: Sanya Dharmasakti; President of the Privy Council
- Athlete's Oath: Suchart Jairsuraparp
- Torch lighter: Dhawee Umponmaha
- Ceremony venue: National Stadium

The 1985 Southeast Asian Games (Thai: กีฬาแห่งเอเชียตะวันออกเฉียงใต้ 1985, romanized: Kila haeng echeiy tawan oak cheing tai 1985), officially known as the 13th Southeast Asian Games, were a Southeast Asian multi-sport event held in Bangkok, Thailand from 8 to 17 December 1985.

This was the fourth time Thailand hosted the games and its first time since 1975. The country had previously hosted the 1959, 1967 and the 1975 editions, at the time when the games were then known as the Southeast Asian Peninsular (SEAP) Games. The games was opened and closed by Bhumibol Adulyadej, the King of Thailand at the Suphachalasai Stadium.

The final medal tally was led by hosts Thailand, followed by Indonesia and the Philippines. Several Games and National records were broken during the games. With little or no controversies at all, the games were deemed generally successful with the rising standard of competition amongst the Southeast Asian nations.

== Organization ==
=== Development and preparation ===
The Bangkok SEA Games Organising Committee was formed to oversee the staging of the games.

=== Venues ===
Province	Competition venue	Sports
Bangkok	National Sport Complex	
Bangkok	Suphachalasai Stadium	Opening and Closing Ceremony, Athletics, Football
Bangkok	Nimibutr Gymnasium	Boxing, Gymnastics
Bangkok	Chanthanayingyong Gymnasium	Judo
Bangkok	Sport Authority of Thailand Sport Complex (Hua Mak)	
Bangkok	Aquatics Centre	Aquatics sport
Bangkok	Football Field	Archery
Bangkok	Indoor Stadium	Volleyball, Sepak takraw
Bangkok	Shooting Range	Shooting
Bangkok	Sport Training Centre	Table tennis
Bangkok	Tennis Court	Tennis
Bangkok	Velodrome	Cycling
Bangkok	Other	
Bangkok	Bangkok Youth Center Sport Complex	Basketball, Football
Bangkok	Chulalongkorn University	Badminton
Bangkok	Kai Siew Treng Hall	Weightlifting
Chonburi	Pattaya Bay	Sailing
Chonburi	Star Bowl	Bowling

== Marketing ==
Siamese cat, the official mascot of the games.

=== Logo ===
The logo of the 1985 SEA Games is the Grand Palace, one of the most popular tourist attractions in Thailand.

=== Mascot ===
The official 1985 SEA Games mascot was a Siamese cat. The Siamese is one of the first distinctly recognised breeds of Oriental cat. It is called Wichien-maat (Thai: วิเชียรมาศ) in Thailand.

== The games ==
=== Participating nations ===
- Burma
- Brunei
- Cambodia
- Indonesia
- Malaysia
- Philippines
- Singapore
- Thailand (Host)

=== Sports ===
- Aquatics
- Archery
- Athletics
- Badminton
- Basketball
- Bowling
- Boxing
- Cycling
- Football
- Gymnastics
- Judo
- Sepak takraw
- Sailing
- Shooting
- Table tennis
- Tennis
- Volleyball
- Weightlifting

=== Medal table ===
Key

* Host nation (Thailand)

Rank	Nation	Gold	Silver	Bronze	Total
1	Thailand (THA)*	92	66	59	217
2	Indonesia (INA)	62	73	76	211
3	Philippines (PHI)	43	54	32	129
4	Malaysia (MAS)	26	28	32	86
5	Singapore (SIN)	16	11	23	50
6	Burma (BIR)	13	19	34	66
7	Brunei (BRU)	0	0	3	3
8	Cambodia (CAM)	0	0	0	0
Totals (8 entries)		252	251	259	762

Preceded by Singapore	Southeast Asian Games; Bangkok; XIII Southeast Asian Games (1985)	Succeeded by Jakarta
