= Walapa Tangjitnusorn =

Thai sprinter

Personal information
- Nationality: Thai
- Born: Walapa Pinij; 14 June 1953 (age 73)

Sport
- Sport: Sprinting
- Event: 100 metres
Medal record
Women's athletics
Representing Thailand
Asian Championships
Gold medal – first place	1983 Kuwait City	4×400 m
Gold medal – first place	1985 Jakarta	4×100 m

Walapa Tangjitnusorn (born 14 June 1953) formerly known as Walapa Pinij is a Thai sprinter. She competed in the women's 100 metres at the 1984 Summer Olympics.
