= Bowling at the 1985 SEA Games =

The bowling at the 1985 SEA Games was held at the Star Bowl in Bangkok, Thailand between December 10 to December 15.

== Medals by event ==
Event	Gold	Silver	Bronze
Men's Single	Malaysia	Philippines	Thailand
Men's Doubles	Philippines	Thailand	Thailand
Men's Triples	Thailand	Singapore	Malaysia
Men's Team of five	Thailand	Malaysia	Philippines
Men's Master	Philippines	Thailand	Thailand
Men's Match Play	Thailand	Thailand	Philippines
Women's Single	Thailand	Malaysia	Singapore
Women's Doubles	Philippines	Indonesia	Philippines
Women's Triples	Singapore	Indonesia	Thailand
Women's Team of five	Philippines	Indonesia	Singapore
Women's Master	Indonesia	Singapore	Malaysia
Women's Match Play	Thailand	Thailand	Philippines
