= 1983 SEA Games =

Multi-sport event in Singapore

12th Southeast Asian Games
- Host city: Singapore
- Nations: 8
- Sport: 18
- Opening: 28 May 1983
- Closing: 6 June 1983
- Opened by: Devan Nair; President of Singapore
- Closed by: Devan Nair; President of Singapore
- Torch lighter: Tan Eng Yoon
- Ceremony venue: Singapore National Stadium

The 1983 Southeast Asian Games, officially known as the 12th Southeast Asian Games, or informally Singapore 1983, were a Southeast Asian multi-sport event held in Singapore from 28 May to 6 June 1983. Scheduled to be hosted by Brunei in accordance to the renewed alphabetical rotation of hosting duties, the 1983 SEA Games were offered to be hosted by Singapore as Brunei prepared for its forthcoming independence from the United Kingdom. The games also marked the return of Cambodia, as People's Republic of Kampuchea after an 8-year-long absence since the Khmer Rouge seized power in 1975.

The games were opened and closed by Devan Nair, the President of Singapore at the Singapore National Stadium. The final medal tally was led by Indonesia, followed by the Philippines, Thailand and host Singapore.

== The games ==
=== Participating nations ===
Brunei was a British colony at that time until independence on 1 January 1984.

- Burma
- Brunei
- Cambodia
- Indonesia
- Malaysia
- Philippines
- Singapore (Host)
- Thailand

=== Sports ===
- Aquatics
- Archery
- Athletics
- Badminton
- Basketball
- Bowling
- Boxing
- Equestrian
- Football
- Field hockey
- Judo
- Sailing
- Sepak takraw
- Shooting
- Table tennis
- Tennis
- Volleyball
- Weightlifting

== Medal table ==
Key

* Host nation (Singapore)

Rank	Nation	Gold	Silver	Bronze	Total
1	Indonesia (INA)	64	67	54	185
2	Philippines (PHI)	49	48	53	150
3	Thailand (THA)	49	40	38	127
4	Singapore (SIN)*	38	38	58	134
5	Burma (BIR)	18	15	17	50
6	Malaysia (MAS)	16	25	40	81
7	Brunei (BRU)	0	0	5	5
8	Cambodia (CAM)	0	0	0	0
Totals (8 entries)		234	233	265	732

Preceded by Manila	Southeast Asian Games; Singapore; XII Southeast Asian Games (1983)	Succeeded by Bangkok
