= Philippines at the 1987 SEA Games =

Philippines at the 1987 Southeast Asian Games
- IOC code: PHI
- NOC: Philippine Olympic Committee
- Website: www.olympic.ph (in English)

in Jakarta
- Medals Ranked 3rd: Gold 59 Silver 78 Bronze 70 Total 207

Southeast Asian Games appearances (overview)
- 1977; 1979; 1981; 1983; 1985; 1987; 1989; 1991; 1993; 1995; 1997; 1999; 2001; 2003; 2005; 2007; 2009; 2011; 2013; 2015; 2017; 2019; 2021; 2023; 2025; 2027; 2029

The Philippines participated at the 14th Southeast Asian Games held in Jakarta, Indonesia.

== SEA Games Performance ==
Out of 376 Gold medals at stake, the Philippine contingent won 59 or 15.69%. The medal tallies indicate a continuing decline in the performance of Filipino athletes in the Southeast Asian Games, the same trend is noted in the Silver and Bronze medal categories. Philippine Olympic Committee (POC) President Jose Sering was so far happy that the athletes did better and Gintong Alay Director Jose Romasanta said it was good enough.

== Medalists ==
=== Gold ===
| No. | Medal | Name | Sport | Event |
|---|---|---|---|---|
| 1 | Gold | Joanne Chan | Archery | Women's 50m Double Fita |
| 2 | Gold | Hector Begeo | Athletics | Men's 3000m Steeplechase |
| 3 | Gold | Lydia de Vega | Athletics | Women's 100m |
| 4 | Gold | Lydia de Vega | Athletics | Women's 200m |
| 5 | Gold | Agrippina de la Cruz | Athletics | Women's 100m hurdles |
| 6 | Gold | Nenita Adan | Athletics | Women's 400m hurdles |
| 7 | Gold | Lydia de Vega | Athletics | Women's long jump |
| 8 | Gold | Philippines | Basketball | Men's team |
| 9 | Gold | Sammy Ayachok | Bodybuilding | Men's Light Heavyweight |
| 10 | Gold | Paeng Nepomuceno | Bowling | Men's All-Events |
| 11 | Gold | Paeng Nepomuceno | Bowling | Men's singles |
| 12 | Gold | Paeng Nepomuceno; Delfin Garcia | Bowling | Men's doubles |
| 13 | Gold | Crystal Soberano | Bowling | Women's All-Events |
| 14 | Gold | Crystal Soberano | Bowling | Women's masters |
| 15 | Gold | Crystal Soberano; Cecilia Gaffud | Bowling | Women's doubles |
| 16 | Gold | Bong Coo; Crystal Soberano; Cecilia Gaffud | Bowling | Women's Trio |
| 17 | Gold | Bernardo Rimarim | Cycling | Men's 1000m Individual Trial |
| 18 | Gold | Joselito Santos | Cycling | Men's 4000m Individual Pursuit |
| 19 | Gold | Philippines | Cycling | Men's Pursuit Team |
| 20 | Gold | Percival Alger | Fencing | Men's individual Sabre |
| 21 | Gold | Alexander Tolentino | Gymnastics | Men's vaults |
| 22 | Gold | Bea Lucero | Gymnastics | Women's individual |
| 23 | Gold | Bea Lucero | Gymnastics | Balance Beam |
| 24 | Gold | Jerry Dino | Judo | Men's Extra-light +60kg |
| 25 | Gold | Philippines | Shooting | Men's 50m Free Rifle Team |
| 26 | Gold | Julius Valdez | Shooting | Men's Small Bore Free Rifle |
| 27 | Gold | Philippines | Shooting | Men's Small Bore Free Rifle Team |
| 28 | Gold | Nathaniel Padilla | Shooting | Men's Rapid Fire |
| 29 | Gold | Eric Buhain | Swimming | Men's 200m freestyle |
| 30 | Gold | Eric Buhain | Swimming | Men's 100m butterfly |
| 31 | Gold | Eric Buhain | Swimming | Men's 200m butterfly |
| 32 | Gold | Rene Concepcion | Swimming | Men's 200m individual medley |
| 33 | Gold | Eric Buhain | Swimming | Men's 400m individual medley |
| 34 | Gold | Akiko Thomson | Swimming | Women's 100m backstroke |
| 35 | Gold | Stephen Fernandez | Taekwondo | Men's Bantamweight |
| 36 | Gold | Manuel del Rosario | Taekwondo | Men's Lightweight |
| 37 | Gold | Philippines | Volleyball | Women's team |
| 38 | Gold | Samuel Alegada | Weightlifting | Men's 56kg Clean & Jerk |
| 39 | Gold | Samuel Alegada | Weightlifting | Men's 56kg Overall |
| 40 | Gold | Ramon Solis | Weightlifting | Men's 90kg Snatch |
| 41 | Gold | Ramon Solis | Weightlifting | Men's 90kg Clean & Jerk |
| 42 | Gold | Ramon Solis | Weightlifting | Men's 90kg Overall |
| 43 | Gold | Jaime Sebastian | Weightlifting | Men's above 110kg Snatch |
| 44 | Gold | Jaime Sebastian | Weightlifting | Men's above 110kg Clean & Jerk |
| 45 | Gold | Jaime Sebastian | Weightlifting | Men's above 110kg Overall |

=== Silver ===
| No. | Medal | Name | Sport | Event |
|---|---|---|---|---|
| 1 | Silver | Philippines | Archery | Women's team |
| 2 | Silver | Philippines | Archery | Women's Double Fita Team |
| 3 | Silver | Isidro del Prado | Athletics | Men's 400m |
| 4 | Silver | Hector Begeo | Athletics | Men's 5000m |
| 5 | Silver | Leopoldo Arnillo | Athletics | Men's 400m hurdles |
| 6 | Silver | Carlito Donina | Athletics | Men's 3000m Steeplechase |
| 7 | Silver | Dario De Rosas | Athletics | Men's pole vault |
| 8 | Silver | Agrippina de la Cruz | Athletics | Women's 400m hurdles |
| 9 | Silver | Philippines | Athletics | Women's 4 × 100 m Relay |
| 10 | Silver | Philippines | Athletics | Women's 4 × 400 m Relay |
| 11 | Silver | Dorie Cortejo | Athletics | Women's discus throw |
| 12 | Silver | Erlinda Lavandia | Athletics | Women's javelin throw |
| 13 | Silver | Nene Gamo | Athletics | Women's Heptathlon |
| 14 | Silver | Garzon Abraham | Bodybuilding | Men's Middleweight |
| 15 | Silver | Bong Coo | Bowling | Women's masters |
| 16 | Silver | Philippines | Canoeing | Men's Oars Coxed 3000m |
| 17 | Silver | Marcelino Delica | Cycling | Men's 4000m Individual Pursuit |
| 18 | Silver | Joselito Santos | Cycling | Men's 30km Point Race |
| 19 | Silver | Philippines | Fencing | Men's team Foil |
| 20 | Silver | Alex Santos | Fencing | Men's individual Sabre |
| 21 | Silver | Sergio Jasareno | Gymnastics | Pommel Horse |
| 22 | Silver | Bea Lucero | Gymnastics | Women's floor Exercise |
| 23 | Silver | Bea Lucero | Gymnastics | Women's vaults |
| 24 | Silver | Philippines | Gymnastics | Women's team |
| 25 | Silver | Rene McNremmy | Judo | Men's Above 95kg |
| 26 | Silver | Ramoncito Capistrano | Karate | Men's Featherweight |
| 27 | Silver | Edwin Villorente | Karate | Men's Lightweight |
| 28 | Silver | Julius Valdez | Shooting | Men's 50m Free Rifle |
| 29 | Silver | Nathaniel Padilla | Shooting | Men's Fire Pistol |
| 30 | Silver | Jaime Gracio | Shooting | Men's Mixed Runs |
| 31 | Silver | Philippines | Shooting | Men's Mixed Runs Team |
| 32 | Silver | Philippines | Shooting | Men's Rapid Fire Team |
| 33 | Silver | Rene Concepcion | Swimming | Men's 400m freestyle |
| 34 | Silver | Rene Concepcion | Swimming | Men's 400m individual medley |
| 35 | Silver | Akiko Thomson | Swimming | Women's 200m backstroke |
| 36 | Silver | Jesus Morales | Taekwondo | Men's welterweight |
| 37 | Silver | Joal Pamintuan | Taekwondo | Men's Middleweight |
| 38 | Silver | Romyna Almeida | Taekwondo | Women's Featherweight |
| 39 | Silver | Andres Battad | Tennis | Men's singles |
| 40 | Silver | Andres Battad; Rod Rafael; Raymond Suarez; Manuel Tolentino | Tennis | Men's team |
| 41 | Silver | Dyan Castillejo; Nina Castillejo | Tennis | Women's doubles |
| 42 | Silver | Rod Rafael; Jennifer Saberon | Tennis | Mixed doubles |
| 43 | Silver | Gregorio Colonia | Weightlifting | Men's 52kg Snatch |
| 44 | Silver | Gregorio Colonia | Weightlifting | Men's 52kg Clean & Jerk |
| 45 | Silver | Gregorio Colonia | Weightlifting | Men's 52kg Overall |
| 46 | Silver | Samuel Alegada | Weightlifting | Men's 56kg Snatch |
| 47 | Silver | Luis Bayanin | Weightlifting | Men's 100kg Snatch |
| 48 | Silver | Luis Bayanin | Weightlifting | Men's 100kg Clean & Jerk |
| 49 | Silver | Luis Bayanin | Weightlifting | Men's 100kg Overall |

=== Bronze ===
| No. | Medal | Name | Sport | Event |
|---|---|---|---|---|
| 1 | Bronze | Helia Patracios | Archery | Women's 70m |
| 2 | Bronze | Joanne Chan | Archery | Women's Grand Total |
| 3 | Bronze | Romeo Gido | Athletics | Men's 800m |
| 4 | Bronze | Nenita Adan | Athletics | Women's 100m hurdles |
| 5 | Bronze | Jessie Alfonso; Salvador Banquiles; Antonio Mance Jr. Anthony Ave | Badminton | Men's team |
| 6 | Bronze | Philippines | Basketball | Women's team |
| 7 | Bronze | Abesamis David | Bodybuilding | Men's Lightweight |
| 8 | Bronze | Renato Dio | Bodybuilding | Men's welterweight |
| 9 | Bronze | Philippines | Bowling | Men's team of Five |
| 10 | Bronze | Cathy Solis | Bowling | Women's singles |
| 11 | Bronze | Philippines | Bowling | Women's team of Five |
| 12 | Bronze | Benjamin Ramos | Canoeing | Men's Single Culls |
| 13 | Bronze | Philippines | Canoeing | Men's Oars Coxed 2000m |
| 14 | Bronze | Dayanan Feliciano | Cycling | Men's 1000m Individual Sprint |
| 15 | Bronze | Philippines | Cycling | Men's 2nd Stage Tour de Sea Games Team |
| 16 | Bronze | Philippines | Cycling | Men's Tour de Sea Games Team |
| 17 | Bronze | Philippines | Fencing | Men's team sabre |
| 18 | Bronze | Philippines | Fencing | Men's team Épée |
| 19 | Bronze | Philippines | Fencing | Women's team Foil |
| 20 | Bronze | Sergio Jasareno | Gymnastics | Men's floor Exercise |
| 21 | Bronze | Rommel Kong | Gymnastics | Pommel Horse |
| 22 | Bronze | Sergio Jasareno | Gymnastics | Men's vaults |
| 23 | Bronze | Philippines | Gymnastics | Men's team |
| 24 | Bronze | Philippines | Karate | Men's team Kata |
| 25 | Bronze | Benjamin Beran | Karate | Men's Bantamweight |
| 26 | Bronze | Jerome Logan | Karate | Men's Heavyweight |
| 27 | Bronze | Richard Paz | Sailing | Men's Boardsailing |
| 28 | Bronze | Ernesto Roldan | Shooting | Men's individual Air Rifle |
| 29 | Bronze | Philippines | Shooting | Men's Air Rifle Team |
| 30 | Bronze | Nathaniel Padilla | Shooting | Men's Standard Pistol 60 shots |
| 31 | Bronze | Philippines | Shooting | Men's Standard Pistol 60 shots Team |
| 32 | Bronze | Jaime Gracio | Shooting | Men's Running Bear |
| 33 | Bronze | Marilou Samaco | Shooting | Women's Air Rifle |
| 34 | Bronze | Philippines | Shooting | Women's Air Rifle Team |
| 35 | Bronze | Philippines | Shooting | Women's air pistol team |
| 36 | Bronze | Mimi De Castro | Shooting | Women's Sport Pistol |
| 37 | Bronze | Philippines | Shooting | Women's Sport Pistol Team |
| 38 | Bronze | Gemma Javison | Shooting | Women's Small Bore Free Rifle |
| 39 | Bronze | Philippines | Shooting | Women's Small Bore Free Rifle Team |
| 40 | Bronze | Marilou Samaco | Shooting | Women's Small Bore 3 Positions |
| 41 | Bronze | Marilou Samaco | Shooting | Women's Small Bore 3 Positions Team |
| 42 | Bronze | Eric Buhain | Swimming | Men's 100m freestyle |
| 43 | Bronze | Martin Palacios | Swimming | Men's 1500m freestyle |
| 44 | Bronze | Eric Buhain | Swimming | Men's 100m backstroke |
| 45 | Bronze | Lee Patrick Concepcion | Swimming | Men's 100m breaststroke |
| 46 | Bronze | Lee Patrick Concepcion | Swimming | Men's 200m breaststroke |
| 47 | Bronze | Allen Reyes | Swimming | Men's 200m butterfly |
| 48 | Bronze | Philippines | Swimming | Men's 4 × 100 m freestyle relay |
| 49 | Bronze | Philippines | Swimming | Men's 4 × 200 m freestyle relay |
| 50 | Bronze | Philippines | Swimming | Men's 4 × 100 m medley relay |
| 51 | Bronze | Philippines | Swimming | Women's 4 × 100 m freestyle relay |
| 52 | Bronze | Philippines | Swimming | Women's 4 × 100 m medley relay |
| 53 | Bronze | Arnold Baradi | Taekwondo | Men's finweight |
| 54 | Bronze | Robert Vargas | Taekwondo | Men's Flyweight |
| 55 | Bronze | Jose Ernesto Roque | Taekwondo | Men's Heavyweight |
| 56 | Bronze | Manuel Tolentino | Tennis | Men's singles |
| 57 | Bronze | Dyan Castillejo; Nina Castillejo; Sarah Rafael; Jennifer Saberon | Tennis | Women's team |
| 58 | Bronze | Dyan Castillejo; Raymond Suarez | Tennis | Mixed doubles |
| 59 | Bronze | Leah Zuniega | Taekwondo | Women's welterweight |
| 60 | Bronze | Agustine Covelin | Weightlifting | Men's 52kg Snatch |
| 61 | Bronze | Agustine Covelin | Weightlifting | Men's 52kg Clean & Jerk |
| 62 | Bronze | Agustine Covelin | Weightlifting | Men's 52kg Overall |

=== Multiple ===
| Name | Sport | 1st place, gold medalist(s) | 2nd place, silver medalist(s) | 3rd place, bronze medalist(s) | Total |
|---|---|---|---|---|---|
| Eric Buhain | Swimming | 4 | 0 | 2 | 6 |
| Crystal Soberano | Bowling | 4 | 0 | 0 | 4 |
| Jaime Sebastian | Weightlifting | 3 | 0 | 0 | 3 |
| Lydia de Vega | Athletics | 3 | 0 | 0 | 3 |
| Paeng Nepomuceno | Bowling | 3 | 0 | 0 | 3 |
| Ramon Solis | Weightlifting | 3 | 0 | 0 | 3 |
| Bea Lucero | Gymnastics | 2 | 2 | 0 | 4 |
| Samuel Alegada | Weightlifting | 2 | 1 | 0 | 3 |
| Cecilia Gaffud | Bowling | 2 | 0 | 0 | 2 |
| Rene Concepcion | Swimming | 1 | 2 | 0 | 3 |
| Nathaniel Padilla | Shooting | 1 | 1 | 1 | 3 |
| Agrippina de la Cruz | Athletics | 1 | 1 | 0 | 2 |
| Akiko Thomson | Swimming | 1 | 1 | 0 | 2 |
| Bong Coo | Bowling | 1 | 1 | 0 | 2 |
| Hector Begeo | Athletics | 1 | 1 | 0 | 2 |
| Joselito Santos | Cycling | 1 | 1 | 0 | 2 |
| Julius Valdez | Shooting | 1 | 1 | 0 | 2 |
| Joanne Chan | Archery | 1 | 0 | 1 | 2 |
| Nenita Adan | Athletics | 1 | 0 | 1 | 2 |
| Gregorio Colonia | Weightlifting | 0 | 3 | 0 | 3 |
| Luis Bayanin | Weightlifting | 0 | 3 | 0 | 3 |
| Andres Battad | Tennis | 0 | 2 | 0 | 2 |
| Rod Rafael | Tennis | 0 | 2 | 0 | 2 |
| Dyan Castillejo | Tennis | 0 | 1 | 2 | 3 |
| Sergio Jasaerno | Gymnastics | 0 | 1 | 2 | 3 |
| Jaime Gracio | Shooting | 0 | 1 | 1 | 2 |
| Jennifer Saberon | Tennis | 0 | 1 | 1 | 2 |
| Manuel Tolentino | Tennis | 0 | 1 | 1 | 2 |
| Nina Castillejo | Tennis | 0 | 1 | 1 | 2 |
| Raymond Suarez | Tennis | 0 | 1 | 1 | 2 |
| Marilou Samaco | Shooting | 0 | 0 | 3 | 3 |
| Lee Patrick Concepcion | Swimming | 0 | 0 | 2 | 2 |
| Agustine Covelin | Weightlifting | 0 | 0 | 3 | 3 |

== Medal summary ==
=== By sports ===
| Sport | Gold | Silver | Bronze | Total |
|---|---|---|---|---|
| Weightlifting | 10 | 9 | 6 | 25 |
| Bowling | 7 | 1 | 3 | 11 |
| Athletics | 6 | 11 | 2 | 19 |
| Swimming | 5 | 4 | 9 | 18 |
| Cycling | 5 | 3 | 4 | 12 |
| Shooting | 4 | 5 | 12 | 21 |
| Billiards | 4 | 3 | 3 | 10 |
| Gymnastics | 3 | 5 | 3 | 11 |
| Taekwondo | 2 | 3 | 4 | 9 |
| Boxing | 2 | 2 | 1 | 5 |
| Judo | 2 | 1 | 1 | 4 |
| Golf | 2 | 0 | 2 | 4 |
| Softball | 2 | 0 | 0 | 2 |
| Fencing | 1 | 2 | 4 | 7 |
| Archery | 1 | 1 | 2 | 4 |
| Basketball | 1 | 0 | 1 | 2 |
| Volleyball | 1 | 0 | 0 | 1 |
| Wrestling | 0 | 19 | 1 | 20 |
| Tennis | 0 | 5 | 2 | 7 |
| Karate | 0 | 2 | 5 | 7 |
| Rowing | 0 | 2 | 2 | 4 |
| Badminton | 0 | 0 | 1 | 1 |
| Yachting | 0 | 0 | 1 | 1 |
| Totals (23 entries) | 58 | 78 | 69 | 205 |
