= Philippines at the 1988 Summer Olympics =

- Flag of the Philippines
- IOC code: PHI
- NOC: Philippine Olympic Committee

in Seoul
- Competitors: 31 (26 men, 5 women) in 11 sports
- Flag bearer: Joseph Eric Buhain
- Medals Ranked 46th: Gold 0 Silver 0 Bronze 1 Total 1

Summer Olympics appearances (overview)
- 1924; 1928; 1932; 1936; 1948; 1952; 1956; 1960; 1964; 1968; 1972; 1976; 1980; 1984; 1988; 1992; 1996; 2000; 2004; 2008; 2012; 2016; 2020; 2024

The Philippines competed at the 1988 Summer Olympics in Seoul, South Korea. 31 competitors, 26 men and 5 women, took part in 40 events in 11 sports.

== Medalists ==
Medal	Name	Discipline	Event	Date
Bronze	Leopoldo Serantes	Boxing	Light flyweight	29 September

== Competitors ==
The following is the list of number of competitors in the Games.

Sport	Men	Women	Total
Archery	1	1	2
Athletics	1	3	4
Boxing	6	–	6
Cycling	3	0	3
Fencing	1	0	1
Judo	3	–	3
Rowing	1	0	1
Sailing	2	0	2
Swimming	3	1	4
Weightlifting	3	–	3
Wrestling	2	–	2
Total	26	5	31

== Archery ==
Men

Athlete	Event	Ranking round		Eighth-final		Quarterfinal		Semifinal		Final	
Athlete	Event	Score	Rank	Score	Rank	Score	Rank	Score	Rank	Score	Rank
Rowel Merto	Individual	1162	68	Did not advance							

Women

Athlete	Event	Ranking round		Eighth-final		Quarterfinal		Semifinal		Final	
Athlete	Event	Score	Rank	Score	Rank	Score	Rank	Score	Rank	Score	Rank
Basilisa Ygnalaga	Individual	1182	49	Did not advance							

== Athletics ==
=== Men ===
==== Track events ====
Athlete	Events	Heat		Semifinal		Final	
Athlete	Events	Time	Position	Time	Position	Time	Position
Hector Begeo	3000m Steeplechase	8:46.60	24	8:35.09	22	Did not advance	

=== Women ===
==== Track Events ====
Athlete	Events	Heat		Round 2		Semifinal		Final	
Athlete	Events	Time	Position	Time	Position	Time	Position	Time	Position
Lydia de Vega	100m	11.67	35	Did not advance					
Agrippina de la Cruz	100m Hurdles	14.36	31	Did not advance					
Nenita Adan	400m	61.92	35			Did not advance			

== Boxing ==
Athlete	Event	Round of 64	Round of 32	Round of 16	Quarterfinals	Semifinals	Final
Athlete	Event	Opposition Result	Opposition Result	Opposition Result	Opposition Result	Opposition Result	Opposition Result
Leopoldo Serantes	Light Flyweight		Hassan (EGY); W RSCH	Stewart (LBR); W 5-0	M'jirih (MAR); W RSCH	Hristov (BUL); L 5-0 (bronze)	Did not advance
Roberto Jalnaiz	Flyweight		Váradi (HUN); L 4-1	Did not advance			
Michael Hormillosa	Bantamweight	Julio (COL); L RSCH	Did not advance				
Orlando Dollente	Featherweight	Seymour (BAH); L DISQ	Did not advance				
Leopoldo Cantancio	Lightweight	Tszyu (URS); L KOH	Did not advance				
Emmanuel Legaspi	Middleweight		Marcus (CAN); L KOH	Did not advance			

== Cycling ==
Three male cyclists represented the Philippines in 1988.

=== Road ===
Men

Athlete	Event	Time	Rank
Domingo Villanueva	Road race	4:45:20 (+13:58)	103
Norberto Oconer	Road race	DNF	-

=== Track ===
Time Trial

Athlete	Event	Points	Rank
Bernardo Rimarim	Men's track time trial	1:11.647	26

Points races

Athlete	Event	Qualification		Final	
Athlete	Event	Points	Rank	Points	Rank
Bernardo Rimarim	Men's points race	-	AB	did not advance	

== Fencing ==
Athlete	Event	Elimination Round	Round I	Repechage Round I	Round II	Repechage Round II	Round III	Repechage Round III	Round IV	Quarterfinal	Semifinal	Final / BM	
Athlete	Event	Opposition Score	Opposition Score	Opposition Score	Opposition Score	Opposition Score	Opposition Score	Opposition Score	Opposition Score	Opposition Score	Opposition Score	Opposition Score	Rank
Percival Alger	Individual sabre	0–6	Did not advance										

== Judo ==
Athlete	Event	Round of 64	Round of 32	Round of 16	Quarterfinals	Semifinals	Repechage	Final / BM	
Athlete	Event	Opposition Result	Opposition Result	Opposition Result	Opposition Result	Opposition Result	Opposition Result	Opposition Result	Rank
Jerry Dino	Men's −60 kg	Zhang (CHN); L IPO	did not advance						
John Baylon	Men's −78 kg	Bye	Bréchôt (GDR); L IPO	did not advance					
Benjamin McMurray	Men's +95 kg	Bye	Stöhr (GDR); L IPO	did not advance					

== Rowing ==
Athlete	Event	Heats		Repechage		Quarterfinals		Semifinals		Final	
Athlete	Event	Time	Rank	Time	Rank	Time	Rank	Time	Rank	Time	Rank
Edgardo Maerina	Men's single sculls	8:54.90	6 R	8:27.02	5	did not advance					22

Qualification Legend: R=Repechage

== Sailing ==
Athlete	Event	Race							Net points	Final rank
Athlete	Event	1	2	3	4	5	6	7	Net points	Final rank
Richard Paz	Division II	~~42~~	41	39	32	23	28	29	192.0	26
Nestor Soriano	Finn	~~40~~	40	36	36	40	40	40	232.0	33

== Swimming ==
Men

Athlete	Event	Heat		Final B		Final	
Athlete	Event	Time	Rank	Time	Rank	Time	Rank
Joseph Eric Buhain	50 m freestyle	24.26	=33	did not advance			
René Concepcion	100 m freestyle	53.84	51	did not advance			
René Concepcion	200 m freestyle	1:55.58	40	did not advance			
Joseph Eric Buhain	200 m freestyle	1:56.84	44	did not advance			
Lee Concepcion	100 m breaststroke	1:06.74	50	did not advance			
Lee Concepcion	200 m breaststroke	2:29.62	46	did not advance			
Joseph Eric Buhain	100 m butterfly	57.17	31	did not advance			
Joseph Eric Buhain	200 m butterfly	2:05.32	32	did not advance			
René Concepcion	200 m IM	2:10.37	30	did not advance			
Lee Concepcion	200 m IM	-	DNS	did not advance			
René Concepcion	400 m IM	4:48.00	30	did not advance			

Women

Athlete	Event	Heat		Final B		Final	
Athlete	Event	Time	Rank	Time	Rank	Time	Rank
Gillian Thomson	50 m freestyle	27.43	30	did not advance			
Gillian Thomson	100 m freestyle	59.41	39	did not advance			
Gillian Thomson	100 m backstroke	1:06.51	28	did not advance			
Gillian Thomson	200 m backstroke	-	DNS	did not advance			

== Weightlifting ==
Men's 54 kilograms

- Gregorio Colonia

Men's 56 kilograms

- Samuel Alegada

Men's 90 kilograms

- Ramon Solis

== Wrestling ==
Men's Greco Roman (– 52 kg)

- Florentino Tirante

Men's Freestyle (– 52 kg)

- Florentino Tirante

Men's Freestyle (– 60 kg)

- Dean Manibog

== Demonstration Sports ==
=== Bowling ===
Arianne Cerdeña won the gold medal. Because bowling was a demonstration sport and not an official event, Cerdena's gold medal is not included in the medal tally.

=== Taekwondo ===
Men's Flyweight

- Stephen Fernandez

Men's Lightweight

- Monsour del Rosario
