= Weightlifting at the 1983 SEA Games =

Weightlifting at the 1983 Southeast Asian Games was held between 29 May to 31 May at Politeknik Ngee Ann, Singapore.

== Medal summary ==
=== Men ===
Event	Gold	Silver	Bronze
52 kg Snatch	(Singapore) Teo Yong Joo	(Indonesia) Lili Entong	(Philippines) Gregorio Colonia
52 kg Clean & Jerk	(Philippines) Gregorio Colonia	(Singapore) Teo Yong Joo	(Singapore) Lee Jing Wen
52 kg Overall	(Philippines) Gregorio Colonia	(Singapore) Teo Yong Joo	(Singapore) Lee Jing Wen
56 kg Snatch	(Indonesia) Maman Suryaman	(Philippines) Samuel Alegada	(Indonesia) Henry Yasin
56 kg Clean & Jerk	(Indonesia) Henry Yasin	(Indonesia) Maman Suryaman	(Myanmar) Hla Win
56 kg Overall	(Indonesia) Maman Suryaman	(Indonesia) Henry Yasin	(Philippines) Samuel Alegada
60 kg Snatch	(Indonesia) Hadi Wihardja	(Singapore) Chua Koon Siong	(Myanmar) Khin Myint
60 kg Clean & Jerk	(Indonesia) Hadi Wihardja	(Singapore) Chua Koon Siong	(Myanmar) Khin Myint
60 kg Overall	(Indonesia) Hadi Wihardja	(Myanmar) Khin Myint	(Singapore) Chua Koon Siong
67,5 kg Snatch	(Indonesia) Sorie Enda Nasution	(Philippines) Edmund Cardano	(Myanmar) Win Bu
67,5 kg Clean & Jerk	(Indonesia) Sorie Enda Nasution	(Myanmar) Win Bu	(Philippines) Edmund Cardano
67,5 kg Overall	(Indonesia) Sorie Enda Nasution	(Myanmar) Win Bu	(Philippines) Edmund Cardano
75 kg Snatch	(Indonesia) Hendrik Effendi	(Indonesia) Warino Lestanto	(Philippines) Renato Dio
75 kg Clean & Jerk	(Indonesia) Warino Lestanto	(Philippines) Renato Dio	(Singapore) Leong Hon Keong
75 kg Overall	(Indonesia) Warino Lestanto	(Philippines) Renato Dio	(Singapore) Leong Hon Keong
82,5 kg Snatch	(Indonesia) Adi Chandra	(Philippines) Ramon Solis	(Singapore) Raymond Chau
82,5 kg Clean & Jerk	(Philippines) Ramon Solis	(Singapore) Yeo Choon Lin	(Singapore) Raymond Chau
82,5 kg Overall	(Philippines) Ramon Solis	(Singapore) Raymond Chau	(Singapore) Yeo Choon Lin
90 kg Snatch	(Indonesia) Joko Buntoro	(Thailand) Chui Bamroongras	(Philippines) Luis Bayanin
90 kg Clean & Jerk	(Myanmar) Kyaw Htet	(Thailand) Chui Bamroongras	(Philippines) Luis Bayanin
90 kg Overall	(Thailand) Chui Bamroongras	(Myanmar) Kyaw Htet	(Philippines) Luis Bayanin
100 kg Snatch	(Myanmar) Sann Myint	(Indonesia) Syahril Muhammad	(Malaysia) Samah Ali
100 kg Clean & Jerk	(Myanmar) Sann Myint	(Indonesia) Syahril Muhammad	(Malaysia) Samah Ali
100 kg Overall	(Myanmar) Sann Myint	(Indonesia) Syahril Muhammad	(Malaysia) Samah Ali
110 kg Snatch	(Singapore) Sarvindar Singh Chopra	(Thailand) Yosto Udon	(Philippines) Rogelio Alinbulio
110 kg Clean & Jerk	(Philippines) Rogelio Alinbulio	(Thailand) Yosto Udon	(Myanmar) Kyat Mint
110 kg Overall	(Philippines) Rogelio Alinbulio	(Thailand) Yosto Udon	(Myanmar) Kyat Mint
Over 110 kg Snatch	(Philippines) Jaime Sebastian	(Thailand) Premtoon Pornpoj	(Myanmar) Pein Aung
Over 110 kg Clean & Jerk	(Philippines) Jaime Sebastian	(Thailand) Premtoon Pornpoj	(Myanmar) Pein Aung
Over 110 kg Overall	(Philippines) Jaime Sebastian	(Thailand) Premtoon Pornpoj	(Myanmar) Pein Aung

== Medal table ==
Rank	Nation	Gold	Silver	Bronze	Total
1	Indonesia (INA)	14	7	1	22
2	Philippines (PHI)	9	5	9	23
3	Burma (BIR)	4	4	9	17
4	Singapore (SIN)	2	6	8	16
5	Thailand (THA)	1	8	0	9
6	Malaysia (MAS)	0	0	3	3
Totals (6 entries)		30	30	30	90
