= Weightlifting at the 1981 SEA Games =

- Venue: Nichols Air Base Gymnasium
- Location: Pasay, Philippines
- Competitors: 7–9 December

The Weightlifting at the 1981 Southeast Asian Games was held between 07 December to 09 December at Nichols Air Base Gymnasium, Pasay, Philippines.

== Medal table ==
Rank	Nation	Gold	Silver	Bronze	Total
1	Indonesia (INA)	18	7	2	27
2	Philippines (PHI)	6	3	12	21
3	Thailand (THA)	3	4	2	9
4	Singapore (SIN)	2	7	0	9
5	Burma (BIR)	1	11	8	20
6	Malaysia (MAS)	0	0	1	1
Totals (6 entries)		30	32	25	87

== Medal summary ==
Event	Gold		Silver		Bronze	
52 kg Snatch	(Indonesia) Maman Suryaman	105 kg (rec)	(Myanmar) Aung Gyi	95	(Philippines) Salvador del Rosario	95
52 kg Clean & Jerk	(Indonesia) Maman Suryaman	122.5	(Myanmar) Aung Gyi (Philippines) Salvador del Rosario	120		
52 kg Total	(Indonesia) Maman Suryaman	227.5 (rec)	(Myanmar) Aung Gyi	215	(Philippines) Salvador del Rosario	210
58 kg Snatch	(Indonesia) Hadi Wihardja	105 kg (rec)	(Indonesia) Conny Theo	102.5	(Philippines) Samuel Alegada	92.5
58 kg Clean & Jerk	(Indonesia) Hadi Wihardja	127.5	(Indonesia) Conny Theo	125	(Philippines) Samuel Alegada	117.5
58 kg Total	(Indonesia) Hadi Wihardja	232.5	(Indonesia) Conny Theo	227.5	(Philippines) Samuel Alegada	210
60 kg Snatch	(Indonesia) Sorie Enda Nasution	120 kg (rec)	(Singapore) Chua Koon Siong	112.5	(Myanmar) Khin Myint	110
60 kg Clean & Jerk	(Indonesia) Sorie Enda Nasution	142.5 (rec)	(Singapore) Chua Koon Siong (Myanmar) Khin Myint	135		
60 kg Total	(Indonesia) Sorie Enda Nasution	262.5 (rec)	(Singapore) Chua Koon Siong	247.5	(Myanmar) Khin Myint	245
67,5 kg Snatch	(Indonesia) Warino Lestanto	122.5 kg (rec)	(Singapore) Chan Hon Choong	90		
67,5 kg Clean & Jerk	(Indonesia) Warino Lestanto	165	(Singapore) Chan Hon Choong	115		
67,5 kg Total	(Indonesia) Warino Lestanto	287.5 (rec)	(Singapore) Chan Hon Choong	205		
75 kg Snatch	(Philippines) Ramon Solis	120 kg	(Indonesia) Hendrik Effendi	120	(Philippines) Renato Dio	117.5
75 kg Clean & Jerk	(Philippines) Ramon Solis	155	(Indonesia) Hendrik Effendi	152.5	(Myanmar) Kyaw Htet	145
75 kg Total	(Philippines) Ramon Solis	275	(Indonesia) Hendrik Effendi	272.5	(Philippines) Renato Dio	260
82,5 kg Snatch	(Thailand) Chui Banroongras	122.5	(Myanmar) San Si Aye	110	(Philippines) Luis Bayanin	105
82,5 kg Clean & Jerk	(Thailand) Chui Banroongras	155	(Indonesia) Halimana Sindharta	155	(Myanmar) San Si Aye	130
82,5 kg Total	(Thailand) Chui Banroongras	277.5	(Myanmar) San Si Aye	250	(Philippines) Luis Bayanin	235
90 kg Snatch	(Indonesia) Joko Buntoro	125	(Myanmar) Sann Myint	120	(Indonesia) Syahril Noer	115
90 kg Clean & Jerk	(Indonesia) Syahril Noer	160	(Myanmar) Sann Myint	155	(Indonesia) Joko Buntoro	152.5
90 kg Total	(Indonesia) Joko Buntoro	277.5	(Indonesia) Syahril Noer	275	(Myanmar) Sann Myint	275
100 kg Snatch	(Indonesia) Condro Adi	122.5	(Philippines) Peter Moran	115	(Thailand) Yosto Udom	115
100 kg Clean & Jerk	(Indonesia) Condro Adi	160	(Thailand) Yosto Udom	160	(Philippines) Peter Moran	135
100 kg Total	(Indonesia) Condro Adi	282.5	(Philippines) Peter Moran	275	(Thailand) Yosto Udom	250
110 kg Snatch	(Myanmar) Kyaw Mint	110	(Singapore) Sarvindar Singh Chopra	110	(Malaysia) Yoke Teck Chong	105
110 kg Clean & Jerk	(Singapore) Sarvindar Singh Chopra	142.5	(Myanmar) Kyaw Mint	140	(Philippines) Rogelio Alimbullo	137.5
110 kg Total	(Singapore) Sarvindar Singh Chopra	252.5	(Myanmar) Kyaw Mint	250	(Philippines) Rogelio Alimbullo	242.5
>110 kg Snatch	(Philippines) Jaime Sebastian	125 (rec)	(Thailand) Pornpoj Premtoon	115	(Myanmar) Pein Aung	110
>110 kg Clean & Jerk	(Philippines) Jaime Sebastian	175 (rec)	(Thailand) Pornpoj Premtoon	150	(Myanmar) Pein Aung	140
>110 kg Total	(Philippines) Jaime Sebastian	300 (rec)	(Thailand) Pornpoj Premtoon	265	(Myanmar) Pein Aung	250
