= Weightlifting at the 1987 SEA Games =

The Powerlifting at the 1987 Southeast Asian Games was held between 17 September to 18 September at Senayan Sports Complex.

== Medal summary ==
=== Men ===
Event	Gold	Silver	Bronze
52 kg Snatch	(Indonesia) Lili Entong Nurhayadi	(Philippines) Gregorio Colonia	(Philippines) Augustine Covelin
52 kg Clean and Jerk	(Indonesia) Lili Entong Nurhayadi	(Philippines) Gregorio Colonia	(Philippines) Augustine Covelin
52 kg Overall	(Indonesia) Lili Entong Nurhayadi	(Philippines) Gregorio Colonia	(Philippines) Augustine Covelin
56 kg Snatch	(Indonesia) Dirdja Wihardja	(Philippines) Samuel Alegada	(Thailand) Puapaiboon Wanchai
56 kg Clean and Jerk	(Philippines) Samuel Alegada	(Indonesia) Dirdja Wihardja	(Thailand) Puapaiboon Wanchai
56 kg Overall	(Philippines) Samuel Alegada	(Indonesia) Dirdja Wihardja	(Thailand) Puapaiboon Wanchai
60 kg Snatch	(Indonesia) Herry Yasin	(Indonesia) Hadi Wihardja	(Malaysia) Sua Jin Cheng
60 kg Clean and Jerk	(Indonesia) Hadi Wihardja	(Indonesia) Herry Yasin	(Myanmar) Khin Myint
60 kg Overall	(Indonesia) Hadi Wihardja	(Indonesia) Herry Yasin	(Myanmar) Khin Myint
82 kg Snatch	(Indonesia) Effendi	(Thailand) Prayan Nunveera	(Malaysia) Edon Nasaruddin
82 kg Clean and Jerk	(Indonesia) Effendi	(Thailand) Prayan Nunveera	(Malaysia) Edon Nasaruddin
82 kg Overall	(Indonesia) Effendi	(Thailand) Prayan Nunveera	(Malaysia) Edon Nasaruddin
90 kg Snatch	(Philippines) Ramon Solis	(Indonesia) Mohammad Yasin	
90 kg Clean and jerk	(Philippines) Ramon Solis	(Indonesia) Mohammad Yasin	
90 kg Overall	(Philippines) Ramon Solis	(Indonesia) Mohammad Yasin	
100 kg Snatch	(Myanmar) Thet Kyaw	(Philippines) Luis Bayanin	(Thailand) Shamchai Boonlue
100 kg Clean and jerk	(Myanmar) Thet Kyaw	(Philippines) Luis Bayanin	(Thailand) Shamchai Boonlue
100 kg Overall	(Myanmar) Thet Kyaw	(Philippines) Luis Bayanin	(Thailand) Shamchai Boonlue
110 kg Snatch	(Indonesia) Gunadi Usman	(Myanmar) Myint San	(Thailand) Udom Yostoh
110 kg Clean and jerk	(Myanmar) Myint San	(Thailand) Udom Yostoh	(Indonesia) Gunadi Usman
110 kg Overall	(Indonesia) Gunadi Usman	(Myanmar) Myint San	(Thailand) Udom Yostoh
>110 kg Snatch	(Philippines) Jaime Sebastian	(Thailand) Premtoon Pornpoj	(Malaysia) Mohammad Razlan Ghani
>110 kg Clean and jerk	(Philippines) Jaime Sebastian	(Malaysia) Mohammad Razlan Ghani	(Thailand) Premtoon Pornpoj
>110 kg Overall	(Philippines) Jaime Sebastian	(Malaysia) Mohammad Razlan Ghani	(Thailand) Premtoon Pornpoj

== Medal table ==
Rank	Nation	Gold	Silver	Bronze	Total
1	Indonesia (INA)	12	8	1	21
2	Philippines (PHI)	8	7	3	18
3	Myanmar (MYA)	4	2	2	8
4	Thailand (THA)	0	5	10	15
5	Malaysia (MAS)	0	2	5	7
Totals (5 entries)		24	24	21	69
