= Malaysia at the 1987 SEA Games =

Malaysia at the 1987 Southeast Asian Games
- IOC code: MAS
- NOC: Olympic Council of Malaysia
- Website: www.olympic.org.my (in English)

in Jakarta
- Competitors: 314 in 21 sports
- Flag bearer: Malek Noor
- Medals Ranked 4th: Gold 35 Silver 41 Bronze 67 Total 143

Southeast Asian Games appearances (overview)
- 1959; 1961; 1965; 1967; 1969; 1971; 1973; 1975; 1977; 1979; 1981; 1983; 1985; 1987; 1989; 1991; 1993; 1995; 1997; 1999; 2001; 2003; 2005; 2007; 2009; 2011; 2013; 2015; 2017; 2019; 2021; 2023; 2025; 2027; 2029

Malaysia competed in the 1987 Southeast Asian Games held in Jakarta, Indonesia from 9 to 20 December 1987.

== Medal summary ==
=== Medals by sport ===
Sport	Gold	Silver	Bronze	Total	Rank
Athletics	8	2	5	15	
Badminton	0	1	2	3	3
Basketball	1	1	0	2	1
Bowling	1	1	0	2	4
Cycling	2	1	2	5	
Football	0	1	0	1	2
Swimming	9	3	3	15	2
Table tennis	0	0	1	3	4
Total	35	41	67	143	4

=== Medallists ===
Medal	Name	Sport	Event
Gold	Nordin Mohamed Jadi	Athletics	Men's 400 metres
Gold	Sivalingam Muthiah	Athletics	Men's 1500 metres
Gold	Lou Cwee Peng	Athletics	Men's high jump
Gold	Mohamed Zaki Sadri	Athletics	Men's triple jump
Gold		Athletics	Men's 4 × 400 metres relay
Gold	Josephine Mary Singarayar	Athletics	Women's 400 metres
Gold	Josephine Mary Singarayar	Athletics	Women's 800 metres
Gold		Athletics	Women's 4 × 400 metres relay
Gold	Malaysia national basketball team	Basketball	Women's tournament
Gold	Pearly Chong	Bowling	Women's singles
Gold	Rosman Alwi	Cycling	Men's sprint
Gold	Kumaresan Murugayan	Cycling	Men's points race
Gold	Jeffrey Ong	Swimming	Men's 400 metre freestyle
Gold	Jeffrey Ong	Swimming	Men's 1500 metre freestyle
Gold	Nurul Huda Abdullah	Swimming	Women's 100 metre freestyle
Gold	Nurul Huda Abdullah	Swimming	Women's 200 metre freestyle
Gold	Nurul Huda Abdullah	Swimming	Women's 400 metre freestyle
Gold	Nurul Huda Abdullah	Swimming	Women's 800 metre freestyle
Gold	Nurul Huda Abdullah	Swimming	Women's 100 metre butterfly
Gold	Nurul Huda Abdullah	Swimming	Women's 200 metre butterfly
Gold	Nurul Huda Abdullah	Swimming	Women's 400 metre individual medley
Silver	Ahmad Mazlan	Athletics	Men's long jump
Silver	Doris Chong	Athletics	Women's long jump
Silver	Malaysia national badminton team	Badminton	Men's team
Silver	Malaysia national basketball team	Basketball	Men's tournament
Silver	Cheong Yee Fong	Bowling	Women's singles
Silver		Cycling	Men's team pursuit
Silver	Malaysia national football team: Raimi Jamil; Maniam Ravindran; Mahmud Muhaidin Salim; K. Gunalan; Lee Kin Hong; Salim Mahmud; Jailani Wilastra; Muhamad Radhi Mat Din; Azizol Abu Haniffah; Mohd Hashim Mustapha; Nasir Yusof; Hassan Sani; Yunus Alif; Dollah Salleh; Khalid Shahdan; Zulkifli Abdullah	Football	Men's tournament
Silver		Karate	Men's team kata
Silver		Karate	Women's team kata
Silver	Peter Lim	Shooting	Men's clay target
Silver	Sabiahmad Ahmad	Shooting	Men's standard pistol 25 shots
Silver	Sabiahmad Ahmad	Shooting	Men's standard pistol 60 shots
Silver	Huang Ying Tsang	Swimming	Men's 1500 metre freestyle
Silver	May Tan Seok Khoon	Swimming	Women's 100 metre butterfly
Silver	Nurul Huda Abdullah	Swimming	Women's 200 metre individual medley
Bronze	Badrul Jamaluddin	Athletics	Men's 400 metres hurdles
Bronze	Ramjit Nairu	Athletics	Men's high jump
Bronze	Arjan Singh	Athletics	Men's shot put
Bronze	Sajaratuldur Hamzah	Athletics	Women's 100 metres
Bronze	Wong Leh Kin	Athletics	Women's heptathlon
Bronze	Ong Ewe Chye; Rahman Sidek	Badminton	Men's doubles
Bronze	Malaysia national badminton team	Badminton	Women's team
Bronze	Rosman Alwi	Cycling	Men's 1000 metre time trial
Bronze	Ishak Amin	Cycling	Men's points race
Bronze	Paul Vung Ching Chin	Karate	Men's individual kata
Bronze	Jane Liu	Karate	Women's individual kata
Bronze	Jasni Shaari	Shooting	Men's 50 metre rifle prone
Bronze		Shooting	Men's team 50 metre rifle prone
Bronze		Shooting	Men's team standard pistol 25 shots
Bronze	May Tan Seok Khoon	Swimming	Women's 200 metre freestyle
Bronze	May Tan Seok Khoon	Swimming	Women's 200 metre butterfly
Bronze		Swimming	Men's waterpolo team
Bronze	Lim Chin Leong	Table tennis	Men's singles

== Football ==
=== Men's tournament ===
Group A

Team	Pld	W	D	L	GF	GA	GD	Pts
Burma	2	0	2	0	2	2	0	2
Malaysia	2	0	2	0	2	2	0	2
Singapore	2	0	2	0	0	0	0	2

10 September 1987

Singapore	0 – 0	Malaysia

Senayan Stadium, Jakarta

12 September 1987

Malaysia	2 – 2	Burma
Khalid Shahdan 41'; Muhamad Radhi Mat Din 81'		Than Toe Aung 45'; Myint Zaw 54'

Senayan Stadium, Jakarta

Semifinal

16 September 1987

Thailand	0 – 2	Malaysia
		Hassan Sani 68'; Dollah Salleh 73'

Senayan Stadium, Jakarta

Gold medal match

20 September 1987

Indonesia	1 – 0 (a.e.t.)	Malaysia
Ribut Waidi 91'

Senayan Stadium, Jakarta
Attendance: 120,000
