= Indonesia at the 1984 Summer Olympics =

- IOC code: INA
- NOC: Indonesian Olympic Committee

in Los Angeles
- Competitors: 16 in 6 sports
- Flag bearer: Lukman Niode
- Medals: Gold 0 Silver 0 Bronze 0 Total 0

Summer Olympics appearances (overview)
- 1952; 1956; 1960; 1964; 1968; 1972; 1976; 1980; 1984; 1988; 1992; 1996; 2000; 2004; 2008; 2012; 2016; 2020; 2024

Indonesia was represented at the 1984 Summer Olympics in Los Angeles, California, United States by the Indonesian Olympic Committee.

In total, 16 athletes including 13 men and three women represented Indonesia in six different sports including archery, athletics, boxing, shooting, swimming and weightlifting.

== Background ==
The Indonesian Olympic Committee was founded in 1947 but it wasn't recognised by the International Olympic Committee until 1952. Indonesia made their Olympic debut at the 1952 Summer Olympics in Helsinki, Finland. They had missed the 1964 Summer Olympics in Tokyo, Japan and they also took part in the United States-led boycott of the 1980 Summer Olympics in Moscow, Russian Soviet Federative Socialist Republic, Soviet Union. The 1984 Summer Olympics in Los Angeles, California, United States marked their seventh appearance at the Olympics.

== Competitors ==
In total, 16 athletes represented Indonesia at the 1984 Summer Olympics in Los Angeles, California, United States across six different sports.

Sport	Men	Women	Total
Archery	2	0	2
Athletics	4	1	5
Boxing	3	0	3
Shooting	0	2	2
Swimming	1	0	1
Weightlifting	3	0	3
Total	13	3	16

== Archery ==
In total, two Indonesian athletes participated in the archery events – Donald Pandiangan and Suradi Rukimin in the men's individual.

== Athletics ==
In total, five Indonesian athletes participated in the athletics events – Mohamed Purnomo and Christian Nenepath in the men's 100 m, the men's 200 m and the men's 4 x 100 m relay, Johannes Kardiono and Ernawan Witarsa in the men's 4 x 100 m relay and Emma Tahapari in the women's 200 m and the women's 400 m.

Men's Track
Athlete	Event	Heat		Quarterfinal		Semifinal		Final	
Athlete	Event	Result	Rank	Result	Rank	Result	Rank	Result	Rank
Mohamed Purnomo	Men's 100 metres	10.40	2 (Heat 2)	10.43	3 (Heat 4)	10.51	8 (Heat 1)	Did not advance	
Mohamed Purnomo	Men's 200 metres	21.01	3 (Heat 9)	20.93	5 (Heat 1)	Did not advance			
Christian Nenepath	Men's 100 metres	10.66	4 (Heat 3)	Did not advance					
Christian Nenepath	Men's 200 metres	22.20	7 (Heat 3)	Did not advance					
Christian Nenepath; Mohamed Purnomo; Ernawan Witarsa; Johannes Kardiono	Men's 4 × 100 metres	—N/a		40.43	3 (Heat 3)	40.37	6 (Heat 1)	Did not advance	
Emma Tahapari	Women's 200 metres	25.07	6 (Heat 4)	Did not advance					
Emma Tahapari	Women's 400 metres	55.82	5 (Heat 3)	Did not advance					

== Boxing ==
In total, three Indonesian athletes participated in the boxing events – Johny Asadoma in the bantamweight category, Francisco Lisboa in the welterweight category and Alexander Wassa in the featherweight category.

Athlete	Event	Round of 32	Round of 16	Quarterfinals	Semifinals	Final	
Athlete	Event	Opposition Result	Opposition Result	Opposition Result	Opposition Result	Opposition Result	Rank
Johny Asadoma	Bantamweight	López (MEX); L KO-3	did not advance				
Alexander Wassa	Featherweight	Meesuanthong (THA); W w/o	Hegazi (EGY); L 2-3	did not advance			
Francisco Lisboa	Welterweight	Frazer (JAM); L 0-5	did not advance				

== Shooting ==
In total, two Indonesian athletes participated in the shooting events – Selvyana Adrian-Sofyan and Lely Sampoerno in the women's 25 m pistol.

== Swimming ==
In total, one Indonesian athlete participated in the swimming events – Lukman Niode in the men's 100 m freestyle, the men's 100 m backstroke and the men's 200 m backstroke.

Athlete	Event	Heat		
Athlete	Event	Time	Rank	Note
Lukman Niode	Men's 100 metre freestyle	54.10	6 (Heat 8)	Did not advance
Lukman Niode	Men's 100 metre backstroke	58.77	5 (Heat 4)	Did not advance
Lukman Niode	Men's 200 metre backstroke	2:09.79	5 (Heat 5)	Did not advance

== Weightlifting ==
In total, three Indonesian athletes participated in the weightlifting events – Sorie Enda Nasution in the –60 kg category, Maman Suryaman in the –52 kg category and Hadi Wihardja in the –56 kg category.

Athlete	Event	Snatch		Clean & Jerk		Total	Rank
Athlete	Event	Result	Rank	Result	Rank	Total	Rank
Maman Suryaman	–52 kg	102.5	=4	125.0	=4	227.5	5
Hadi Wihardja	–56 kg	~~105.0~~	DNF	~~142.5~~	DNF	—	DNF
Sorie Enda Nasution	–60 kg	115.0	=8	152.5	4	267.5	7

== See also ==
- 1984 Paralympic Games
- Indonesia at the Olympics
- Indonesia at the Paralympics
- Indonesia at the 1984 Summer Paralympics
