= Badminton at the 1987 SEA Games – Men's team =

Badminton – Men's team at the 1987 SEA Games
- Venue: Kuningan Hall
- Dates: 10–12 September 1987
- Nations: 4

Medalists
gold medal	Indonesia (INA)
silver medal	Malaysia (MAL)
bronze medal	Thailand (THA)
bronze medal	Philippines (PHI)

The men's team badminton tournament at the 1987 SEA Games was held from 10 to 12 September 1987 at the Kuningan Hall in Jakarta, Indonesia. The event was originally planned to be held in the Istora Senayan Indoor Stadium but was later switched to the Kuningan Hall.

Only four teams competed in this event. Singapore and Burma withdrew from the event.

== Schedule ==
All times are Western Indonesia Time (UTC+07:00)

Date	Time	Event
Thursday, 10 September	09:00	Semi-finals
Saturday, 12 September	13:00	Gold medal match

== Bracket ==
Semi-finals
Indonesia (INA)	5
Thailand (THA)	0
Philippines (PHI)	0
Malaysia (MAL)	5

Gold medal match
Thailand (THA)	4
Malaysia (MAL)	1

== Semi-finals ==
=== Indonesia vs Thailand ===
Indonesia
5
Kuningan Hall
10 September 1987, 09:00

Thailand
0

			1	2	3
1	(Indonesia) (Thailand)	Icuk Sugiarto; Kasemsak Chatujinda	15; 11	14; 17	15; 5
2	(Indonesia) (Thailand)	Eddy Kurniawan; Sompol Kukasemkij	15; 18	15; 5	15; 7
3	(Indonesia) (Thailand)	Alan Budikusuma; Surachai Makkasasithorn	15; 10	18; 15
4	(Indonesia) (Thailand)	Eddy Hartono / Liem Swie King; Sawei Chanseorasmee / Sakrapee Thongsari	18; 13	15; 5
5	(Indonesia) (Thailand)	Bobby Ertanto / Rudy Heryanto; Komchan Promsarin / Siripong Siripool	15; 9	15; 10

=== Malaysia vs Philippines ===
Malaysia
5
Kuningan Hall
10 September 1987, 19:00

Philippines
0

			1	2	3
1	(Malaysia) (Philippines)	Misbun Sidek; Salvador Banquiles	15; 0	15; 0
2	(Malaysia) (Philippines)	Foo Kok Keong; Jessie Alonzo	15; 10	15; 3
3	(Malaysia) (Philippines)	Cheah Soon Kit / Wong Tat Meng; Salvador Banquiles / Jessie Alonzo	15; 2	15; 3
4	(Malaysia) (Philippines)	Ong Ewe Chye / Rahman Sidek; Antonio Mance Jr. / Anthony Ave	15; 1	15; 5
5	(Malaysia) (Philippines)	Kwan Yoke Meng; Antonio Mance Jr.	15; 4	15; 6

== Gold medal match ==
=== Indonesia vs Malaysia ===
Indonesia
4
Kuningan Hall
12 September 1987, 13:00

Malaysia
1

			1	2	3
1	(Indonesia) (Malaysia)	Icuk Sugiarto; Misbun Sidek	15; 7	15; 9
2	(Indonesia) (Malaysia)	Eddy Kurniawan; Foo Kok Keong	11; 15	15; 8	15; 3
3	(Indonesia) (Malaysia)	Eddy Hartono / Liem Swie King; Cheah Soon Kit / Wong Tat Meng	15; 8	15; 4
4	(Indonesia) (Malaysia)	Bobby Ertanto / Rudy Heryanto; Ong Ewe Chye / Rahman Sidek	12; 15	15; 11	14; 18
5	(Indonesia) (Malaysia)	Alan Budikusuma; Kwan Yoke Meng	15; 4	15; 1

== See also ==
- Individual event tournament
- Women's team tournament
