= Athletics at the 1987 SEA Games =

The athletics competition at the 1987 SEA Games was held at the Senayan Stadium, Jakarta, Indonesia.

== Medal summary ==
=== Men ===
Event	Gold		Silver		Bronze	
100 m	(Thailand) Sumet Promna	10.36 CR	(Indonesia) Mardi Lestari	10.49	(Singapore) Haron Mundir	10.57
200 m	(Thailand) Sumet Promna	20.99	(Indonesia) Mohamed Purnomo	21.26	(Singapore) Haron Mundir	21.30
400 m	(Malaysia) Nordin Jadi	46.56	(Philippines) Isidro del Prado	46.78	(Indonesia) Elieser Wattebosi	
800 m	(Myanmar) Tun Wein Thein	1:51.45	(Thailand) Chern Srichudanu	1:52.07	(Philippines) Romeo Gido	1:52.16
1500 m	(Malaysia) Muthiah Sivalingam	3:56.25	(Myanmar) Shwe Aung	3:56.57	(Thailand) Chera Srichudanu	3:57.94
5000 m	(Indonesia) Eduardus Nabunome	14:35.23	(Philippines) Hector Begeo	15:05.33	(Indonesia) Zainuddin	15:09.04
10,000 m	(Indonesia) Eduardus Nabunome	30:16.45 CR	(Indonesia) Zainuddin	31:32.78	(Myanmar) Phillips	31:57.71
Marathon	(Indonesia) Ali Sofyan Siregar	2:31:58	(Myanmar) Phillips	2:32:35	(Indonesia) Suharyanto	2:35:38
110 m hurdles	(Indonesia) Hero Prayogo	14.29 CR	(Indonesia) Fauzan Sunardi	14.30	(Thailand) Anekpol Mongkoldech	14.78
400 m hurdles	(Indonesia) Herman Mandagi	51.92	(Philippines) Leopoldo Arnillo	53.30	(Malaysia) Badrul Jamaluddin	53.32
3000 m steeplechase	(Philippines) Hector Begeo	9:08.03 CR	(Philippines) Carlito Donina	9:16.35	(Indonesia) Samuel Huwae	9:20.62
4 × 100 m relay	Thailand Chainarong Wangganon; Visut Watanasin; Anuwat Sernsiri; Sumet Promna	39.72 CR	Indonesia Mohammad Fahri; Mardi Lestari; Ernawan Witarsa; Mohamed Purnomo	40.17	Singapore Hong Jin Sheng; Haron Mundir; Francis Nathan; Sandy Ang	41.43
4 × 400 metres relay	Malaysia Ismail Hashim; Joseph Phan; Andrew Scully; Nordin Mohamed Jadi	3:09.40	Thailand Chanvint Insawang; Anucha Santirangsimant; Nipon Boonchern; Sumet Promna	3:10.88	Indonesia Herman Mandagi; Petrus Aprians; Slamet Widodo; Elieser Wattebosi	3:10.95
10 km walk	(Indonesia) Rachmad Sumarsono	45:19.01	(Indonesia) Jamaluddin Lawa	46:51.60	(Myanmar) Apparoa	47:59.56
20 km walk	(Indonesia) Rachmad Sumarsono	1:37:17.70	(Myanmar) Myint Lwin	1:39:10.90	(Indonesia) Jamaludin Lawa	1:39:57.30
Pole vault	(Indonesia) Hadi Wacono	4.55 m	(Philippines) Dario De Rosas	4.40	(Indonesia) Nirman Rampai	4.40
High jump	(Malaysia) Lou Cwee Peng	2.10 m	(Thailand) Pithoon Hreanthong	2.10	(Malaysia) Ramjit Nairu	2.06
Long jump	(Indonesia) Eko Subagyo	7.52 m	(Malaysia) Ahmad Mazlan	7.48	(Indonesia) Marwoto	7.28
Triple jump	(Malaysia) Mohammad Zaki Sadri	15.37 m	(Thailand) S. Thaveechalermdit	15.32	(Malaysia) Sidek Sahak	15.04
Shot put	(Thailand) Bancha Supanroj	15.96 CR	(Indonesia) Geraldus Balagaise	15.29	(Malaysia) Arjan Singh	15.18
Discus throw	(Thailand) Ardol Kerdsri	47.52 m	(Myanmar) Saw Hein Shwee	46.40	(Singapore) James Wong Tuck Yim	44.82
Hammer throw	(Indonesia) Budi Dharma	52.09 m	(Malaysia) Samret Dhaliwal	49.72	(Indonesia) Daniel Gianto	49.38
Javelin throw	(Indonesia) Frans Mahuse	75.38 CR	(Thailand) Perc Jodee	67.98	(Indonesia) Timothius Ndiken	66.48
Decathlon	(Indonesia) Julius Uwe	7001 pts CR	(Thailand) Thavorn Phanroeng	6009	(Indonesia) Joseph Miagan	5873

=== Women ===
Event	Gold		Silver		Bronze	
100 m	(Philippines) Lydia de Vega	11.28 CR	(Thailand) Ratjai Sripet	11.81	(Malaysia) Sajaratuldur Hamzah	11.85
200 m	(Philippines) Lydia de Vega	23.57	(Thailand) Ratjai Sripet	23.93	(Malaysia) Sajaratuldur Hamzah	24.00
400 m	(Malaysia) Josephine Mary Singarayar	54.25	(Myanmar) Thin Thin Maw	54.67	(Myanmar) Mar Mar Oo	54.82
800 m	(Malaysia) Josephine Mary Singarayar	2:09.99	(Thailand) Sukanya Sang-Ngeun	2:12.26	(Indonesia) Esther Sumah	2:15.73
1500 m	(Thailand) Charin Suanangrong	4:40.69	(Indonesia) Marcelina Ina Piran	4:43.06	(Indonesia) Olivia Nieszer	4:58.27
3000 m	(Myanmar) Khin Khin Htwe	9:35.35	(Indonesia) Martha Kase	10:10.76	(Singapore) K. Jayamani	10:53.56
5000 m	(Myanmar) Khin Khin Htwe	16:42.31	(Indonesia) Helena Muslina	17:02.86	(Indonesia) Sarmiati	17:09.38
10,000 m	(Myanmar) Mar Mar Min	35:28.83	(Indonesia) Sarmiyati	36:13.09	(Myanmar) Victoria	37:19.95
Marathon	(Myanmar) Mar Mar Min	2:50:51	(Indonesia) Tan Siu Chen	2:52:11	(Indonesia) Maria Lawalata	2:56:44
100 m hurdles	(Philippines) Agrippina de la Cruz	14.19	(Myanmar) Aye Aye Maw	14.70	(Philippines) Nenita Adan	14.75
400 m hurdles	(Philippines) Nenita Adan	60.38	(Philippines) Agrippina de la Cruz	60.57	(Indonesia) Martha Lekransi	60.62
4 × 100 m relay	Thailand Jaree Patarach; Reawadee Srithoa; Ratjai Sripet; Walapa Tangjitnusorn	45.57	Philippines Elena Ganosa; Nene Gamo; Agrippina de la Cruz; Lydia De Vega	45.92	Indonesia Budi Nurani Soekidi; Henny Maspaitella; Rosalina Erari; Mailen Tawas	46.48
4 × 400 m relay	Malaysia Rathna Devi; Oon Yee Chan; Sajaratuldur Hamzah; Josephine Mary Singarayar	3:42.69	Philippines Elena Ganosa; Nenita Adan; Agrippina de la Cruz; Lydia De Vega	3:44.44	Myanmar Ma Aung Kyi; Nu Nu Yiu; Mar Mar Oo; Thin Thin Maw	3:44.95
5 km walk	(Indonesia) Iece Magdalena	24:42.18	(Myanmar) Win Win	24:54.81	(Singapore) Helen Liew	25:54.36
10 km walk	(Myanmar) Hla Swe	53:52.11	(Myanmar) Kyin Lwan	54:10.15	(Indonesia) Iece Magdalena	55:10.04
Long jump	(Philippines) Lydia de Vega	6.27 m CR	(Malaysia) Doris Chong	6.08	(Thailand) Somboon Wataporn	6.07
High jump	(Thailand) Sangkokorn Rangpodok	1.71 m	(Indonesia) Nini Patriana	1.71	(Myanmar) San San Aye	1.68
Shot put	(Indonesia) Josephine Mahuse	14.34 m	(Malaysia) Lee Chiew Ha	13.85	(Indonesia) Yunita S. Paomey	6.07
Discus throw	(Indonesia) Juliana Effendi	43.98 m	(Philippines) Dorie Cortejo	42.48		
Javelin throw	(Indonesia) Tati Ratnaningsih	51.10 m	(Philippines) Erlinda Lavandia	45.96	(Thailand) Chantha Wongsawas	44.44
Heptathlon	(Indonesia) Jublina Mangi	4687 pts	(Philippines) Nene Gamo	4607	(Malaysia) Wong Leh Kin	4178

== Medal table ==
Rank	Nation	Gold	Silver	Bronze	Total
1	Indonesia (INA)	17	13	19	49
2	Thailand (THA)	8	9	4	21
3	Malaysia (MAS)	8	4	7	19
4	Philippines (PHI)	6	11	2	19
5	Myanmar (MYA)	6	8	6	20
6	Singapore (SIN)	0	0	6	6
Totals (6 entries)		45	45	44	134
