= Badminton at the 1987 SEA Games – Women's team =

Badminton – Women's team at the 1987 SEA Games
- Venue: Kuningan Hall
- Dates: 10–12 September 1987
- Nations: 3

Medalists
gold medal	Indonesia (INA)
silver medal	Thailand (THA)
bronze medal	Malaysia (MAL)

The women's team badminton tournament at the 1987 SEA Games was held from 10 to 12 September 1987 at the Kuningan Hall in Jakarta, Indonesia. The event was originally planned to be held in the Istora Senayan Indoor Stadium but was later switched to the Kuningan Hall.

Only three teams competed in this event. The event was played in a round-robin basis.

== Schedule ==
All times are Western Indonesia Time (UTC+07:00)

Date	Time	Event
Thursday, 10 September	09:00	Indonesia vs Thailand
Thursday, 10 September	19:00	~~Malaysia vs Thailand~~
Saturday, 12 September	13:00	Indonesia vs Malaysia

== Round robin ==
Pos	Team	Pld	W	L	MF	MA	MD	GF	GA	GD	PF	PA	PD	Pts	Qualification
1	Indonesia	2	2	0	10	0	+10	20	1	+19	263	96	+167	2	Gold medal
2	Thailand	2	1	1	0	5	−5	1	10	−9	56	137	−81	1	Silver medal
3	Malaysia	2	0	2	0	10	−10	0	10	−10	40	126	−86	0	Bronze medal

Source: NewspaperSG

=== Indonesia vs Thailand ===
Indonesia
5
Kuningan Hall
10 September 1987, 09:00

Thailand
0

			1	2	3
1	(Indonesia) (Thailand)	Elizabeth Latief; Vilailak Sattayapun	11; 0	11; 2
2	(Indonesia) (Thailand)	Sarwendah Kusumawardhani; Ladawan Mulasartsatorn	8; 11	11; 3	11; 4
3	(Indonesia) (Thailand)	Susi Susanti; Somharuthai Jaroensiri	11; 6	11; 2
4	(Indonesia) (Thailand)	Verawaty Fadjrin / Rosiana Tendean; Amporn Kaipituk / Phanwad Jinasuyanont	15; 3	15; 5
5	(Indonesia) (Thailand)	Yanti Kusmiati / Erma Sulistianingsih; Ladawan Mulasartsatorn / Piyathip Sansaniyakulvilai	18; 13	15; 7

=== Indonesia vs Malaysia ===
Indonesia
5
Kuningan Hall
11 September 1987, 13:00

Malaysia
0

			1	2	3
1	(Indonesia) (Malaysia)	Elizabeth Latief; Leong Chai Lean	11; 6	11; 9
2	(Indonesia) (Malaysia)	Sarwendah Kusumawardhani; Tan Mei Chuan	11; 4	11; 5
3	(Indonesia) (Malaysia)	Lilik Sudarwati; Kok Chan Fong	11; 4	11; 5
4	(Indonesia) (Malaysia)	Verawaty Fadjrin / Rosiana Tendean; Leong Chai Lean / Tan Sui Hoon	15; 1	15; 0
5	(Indonesia) (Malaysia)	Yanti Kusmiati / Erma Sulistianingsih; Kok Chan Fong / Lim Siew Choon	15; 4	15; 2

== See also ==
- Individual event tournament
- Men's team tournament
