= Sabiamad Abdul Ahad =

Malaysian sport shooter (1956–2021)

Personal information
- Nationality: Malaysia
- Born: 20 March 1956 Muar, Johor, Federation of Malaya (now Malaysia)
- Died: 10 April 2021 (aged 65) Hospital Serdang, Kajang, Selangor, Malaysia
- Resting place: Kampung Sungai Ramal Dalam Muslim Cemetery, Kajang, Selangor
- Height: 1.68 m (5 ft 6 in)
- Weight: 68 kg (150 lb)

Sport
- Sport: Shooting
Medal record
Men's Shooting
Representing Malaysia
South-East Asian Games
Gold medal – first place	1983 Singapore	50m pistol
Gold medal – first place	1987 Jakarta	Fire pistol

Sabiamad Abdul Ahad (20 March 1956 – 10 April 2021) was a Malaysian sport shooter.

Sabiamad was born in Muar, Johor and was the Standard Pistol and Free Pistol shooting champion and also national record holder.

He ruled the Air Pistol event at the South-East Asia level and also the Central Pistol, Rapid Pistol and Standard Pistol events. Among his achievements were winning gold medals at the Singapore 1983 SEA Games in the men's 50m pistol and Jakarta 1987 SEA Games in the men's fire pistol shooting events. He had also competed and became the Malaysia's flag bearer in the 1984 Summer Olympics at the Los Angeles, United States.

After retirement in 1990s, he continued to be active in the sport as a coach and manager of the national shooting squad, including stints as the national team manager in the Myanmar 2013 SEA Games, Singapore 2017 SEA Games and the Rio 2016 Summer Olympics. He had also been a board member of the National Athletes Welfare Foundation (YAKEB).

== Death ==
Sabiamad, aged 65, died of heart attack in Hospital Serdang, Selangor at 11.00 p.m. on 10 April 2021. He was laid to rest at the Kampung Sungai Ramal Dalam Muslim Cemetery in Kajang. Selangor.

== Honours ==
=== Honours of Malaysia ===
- Malaysia
  - Member of the Order of the Defender of the Realm (AMN) (1985)
- Federal Territory (Malaysia)
  - Commander of the Order of the Territorial Crown (PMW) – Datuk (2011)

Olympic Games
Preceded by Ahmed Ishtiaq Mubarak	Flagbearer for Malaysia; Los Angeles 1984	Succeeded by Nordin Mohamed Jadi
