= Weightlifting at the 1973 SEAP Games =

The Weightlifting at the 1973 Southeast Asian Peninsular Games was held between 2 and 5 September.

== Medal summary ==
=== Men ===
Event	Gold	Silver	Bronze
Flyweight	(Myanmar) Gyi Aung Maung	(Thailand) Preecha Chiocharn	(Khmer Republic) Eu Heng
Bantamweight	(Myanmar) Tin Sein	(Singapore) Ng Bee Kia	(Thailand) Heng Eng Choon
Featherweight	(Myanmar) Khin Myint	(Singapore) Chua Koon Siong	(Khmer Republic) Ly Sineng
Lightweight	(Myanmar) Aye Win	(Malaysia) Eun Tin Loy	(Thailand) Sam Phon
Light Middleweight	(Thailand) Chul Bumungren	(Myanmar) Pe Aye	(Malaysia) Tan Kim Sun
Middleweight	(Myanmar) Htain Win	(Thailand) Niras Haldon	(Khmer Republic) Ith Sakhan
Middle Heavyweight	(Thailand) Kitti Kanjanajira	(Myanmar) San Ngwee	(Khmer Republic) Hy Sok
Heavyweight	(Myanmar) Myat Khine	(Malaysia) Harban Singh	(Singapore) Quick Ber Ann
Super Heavyweight	(Myanmar) Min Aung	(Thailand) Cheng Jiew Koon	(Khmer Republic) Neau Puth Sakhan

== Medal table ==
Rank	Nation	Gold	Silver	Bronze	Total
1	Burma (BIR)	7	2	0	9
2	Thailand (THA)	2	3	2	7
3	Malaysia (MAS)	0	2	1	3
3	Singapore (SIN)	0	2	1	3
5	Cambodia (KHM)	0	0	5	5
Totals (5 entries)		9	9	9	27

== Sources ==
- Yesterday's results
- Yesterday's Seap results
