= Mardi Lestari =

Indonesian sprinter

Personal information
- Full name: Afdiharto Mardi Lestari
- Born: 16 May 1960 (age 66) Binjai, Sumatra, Indonesia
- Height: 1.66 m (5 ft 5 in)
- Weight: 63 kg (139 lb)

Sport
- Sport: Athletics
- Events: 100 m, 200 m
Medal record
Representing Indonesia
SEA Games
| Gold medal – first place | 1989 Kuala Lumpur | 100m |
| Gold medal – first place | 1989 Kuala Lumpur | 200m |
| Gold medal – first place | 1991 Manila | 100m |
| Gold medal – first place | 1993 Singapore | 100m |
| Silver medal – second place | 1987 Jakarta | 100m |

Afdiharto Mardi Lestari (born 19 January 1968) is a retired Indonesian athlete who competed in sprinting events. His biggest success was reaching the semifinals in the 100 metres at the 1988 Summer Olympics in Seoul. In addition, he won multiple medals on regional level.

== International competitions ==
| Year | Competition | Venue | Position | Event | Notes |
Representing Indonesia
| 1986 | Asian Junior Championships | Jakarta, Indonesia | 3rd | 100 m | 10.53 |
| 1987 | Asian Championships | Singapore | 4th | 100 m | |
| 1987 | Southeast Asian Games | Jakarta, Indonesia | 2nd | 100 m | 10.49 |
| 1988 | Olympic Games | Seoul, South Korea | 13th (sf) | 100 m | 10.39 |
| 1988 | Olympic Games | Seoul, South Korea | – | 4 × 100 m relay | DNF |
| 1989 | World Cup | Barcelona, Spain | 8th | 100 m | 10.48^{1} |
| 1989 | Southeast Asian Games | Kuala Lumpur, Malaysia | 1st | 100 m | |
| 1989 | Southeast Asian Games | Kuala Lumpur, Malaysia | 1st | 200 m | |
| 1991 | Southeast Asian Games | Manila, Philippines | 1st | 100 m | 10.44 |
| 1993 | Southeast Asian Games | Singapore | 1st | 100 m | |

^{1}Representing Asia

== Personal bests ==
Outdoor

- 100 metres – 10.20 (Jakarta 1989)
- 200 metres – 21.00 (+1.1 m/s, Kuala Lumpur 1989)
