= Karate at the 1987 SEA Games =

Karate at the 1987 Southeast Asian Games was held between 9 December to 20 December 1987 in Jakarta, Indonesia.

== Medal summary ==
=== Men ===
Event	Gold	Silver	Bronze
Individual Kata	Sumargono (INA)	Gustaf Linileyan (INA)	Paul Vung Ching Chin (MAS)
Team Kata	Indonesia (INA)	Malaysia (MAS)	Philippines (PHI)
Bantamweight	Arivalagan Poonlyah (MAS)	Tan Boon York (MAS)	Benjamin Beran (PHI) Frankie Karly (INA)
Featherweight	David Sihotang (INA)	Ramonato Capistrano (PHI)	Mursalim Bado (INA) See Seng Kiat (BRU)
Lightweight	Nasir Jasuari (INA)	Edwin Villorente (PHI)	Alan Shim (MAS) Kevin Ling (BRU)
Middleweight	Jeffrey Pontoh (INA)	Sonny Fulok (INA)	Phillip Teo (MAS) Wong Kee Vui (BRU)
Lightheavyeweight	Abdul Somad (INA)	Dany Hindrawan (INA)	Chuan Goh Eng (MAS) Alex Sham (MAS)
Heavyeweight	Versus Bilalu (INA)	P. Sabri (BRU)	Jerome Logan (PHI) Johnny Su (MAS)
Open	Tommy Firman (INA)	Muharno (INA)	See Seng Kiat (BRU) Cyril Yapp (MAS)

=== Women ===
Event	Gold	Silver	Bronze
Individual Kata	Rita Hanafie (INA)	Vera Simatupang (INA)	Jane Liu (MAS)
Team Kata	Indonesia (INA)	Malaysia (MAS)	Brunei Darussalam (BRU)
Bantamweight	Wong Yik Ling (MAS)	M. Dina (INA)	
Lightweight	Anneke Mentari (INA)	Tri Setiati (INA)	Choon Kek Lai (MAS)
Middleweight	Chan Foong Ching (MAS)	Rusyiah Syukur (INA)	Mak Lai Fong (MAS) Rita Murdjiarso (INA)

== Medal table ==
Rank	Nation	Gold	Silver	Bronze	Total
1	Indonesia (INA)	11	8	3	22
2	Malaysia (MAS)	3	3	9	15
3	Philippines (PHI)	0	2	3	5
4	Brunei (BRU)	0	1	5	6
Totals (4 entries)		14	14	20	48
