= Anan Hohsuwan =

Thai windsurfer (born 1966)

Personal information
- Nationality: Thai
- Born: 16 August 1966 (age 59)
- Height: 168 cm (5 ft 6 in)
- Weight: 50 kg (110 lb)

Sailing career
- Sport: Sailing
- Class(es): Lechner, Mistral
Medal record
Men's sailing
Representing Thailand
Southeast Asian Games
Gold medal – first place	1987 Jakarta	Mistral SST

Anan Hohsuwan (Thai: อนันต์ โห้สุวรรณ, born 16 August 1966) is a Thai windsurfer who competed internationally in sailing events. He represented Thailand in the men's Division II windsurfing event at the 1988 Summer Olympics held in Seoul, South Korea. Hohsuwan also competed at the 1987 Southeast Asian Games (SEA Games), participating in sailing competitions.

== Career ==
Anan Hohsuwan is recognized primarily for his contributions to windsurfing as a competitive sport in Thailand. His most notable international appearance was at the 1988 Summer Olympics, where he competed in the men's Division II event, a windsurfing class. Additionally, he took part in sailing competitions at the 1987 SEA Games, a regional multi-sport event among Southeast Asian countries.
