= Shooting at the 1983 SEA Games =

Shooting events at the 1983 Southeast Asian Games was held between 29 May to 5 June at Mount Vernon Shooting Club, Singapore.

== Medal summary ==
=== Men's ===
Event	Gold		Silver		Bronze	
10 m air rifle	(Thailand) Tanin Thaisinlp	573 pts (rec)	(Indonesia) Andi Hendrata	566	(Philippines) Danilo Flores	558
Team air pistol	(Thailand) THAILAND	2.263 pts	(Indonesia) INDONESIA	2.208	(Philippines) PHILIPPINES	2.179
10 m air pistol	(Malaysia) Sabiahmad Abdullah Ahad	571 pts	(Thailand) K. Hantrakool	566	(Philippines) Art Macapagal	558
Team air pistol	(Thailand) THAILAND	2.233 pts	(Indonesia) INDONESIA	2.188	(Philippines) PHILIPPINES	2.170
Centre fire pistol	(Thailand) Charden Pinchinda	575 pts	(Philippines) Nathaniel Padilla	570	(Singapore) Philip Goh	568
Team centre fire pistol	(Thailand) THAILAND	2.287 pts	(Philippines) PHILIPPINES	2.239	(Singapore) SINGAPORE	2.220
50 m free pistol	(Malaysia) Sabiahmad Abdullah Ahad	546 pts (rec)	(Thailand) Samak Chainares	537	(Indonesia) Boy Riswanto	531
Team free pistol	(Thailand) THAILAND	2.129 pts	(Malaysia) MALAYSIA	2.075	(Indonesia) INDONESIA	2.071
25 m standard pistol	(Thailand) Opas Ruengpanyawut	560 pts (rec)	(Philippines) Nathaniel Padilla	542	(Singapore) Kweek See Siong	535
50 m standard pistol	(Thailand) Chakrapan Theinthong	572 pts (rec)	(Philippines) Bartholomew Teyab	552	(Myanmar) Kyaw Sein	550
Team standard pistol	(Thailand) THAILAND	2.190 pts	(Philippines) PHILIPPINES	2.120	(Singapore) SINGAPORE	2.056
25 m rapid fire pistol	(Philippines) Nathaniel Padilla	585 pts	(Thailand) Vit Chaikittikorn	581	(Malaysia) David Hor Tuck Wah	577
Team rapid fire pistol	(Thailand) THAILAND	2.298 pts	(Philippines) PHILIPPINES	2.270	(Singapore) SINGAPORE	2.230
50 m small bore	(Thailand) Padet Vejsavarn	591 pts	(Singapore) Mohd Nor	587	(Malaysia) Mansor Shaher	586
Team small bore	(Thailand) THAILAND	2.341 pts	(Singapore) SINGAPORE	2.329	(Philippines) PHILIPPINES	2.321
Individual Skeet	(Singapore) Peter Lee	187 pts	(Thailand) Pichit Burapavong	187	(Malaysia) Ong Tai Hong	181
Team Skeet	(Malaysia) MALAYSIA	539	(Thailand) THAILAND	534	(Singapore) SINGAPORE	531
Individual Trap	(Philippines) Manuel Verzosa Valdes	183 pts (rec)	(Singapore) Lee Kum Cheok	181	(Thailand) Dipya Ongkollugsana	181
Team Trap	(Singapore) SINGAPORE	539	(Philippines) PHILIPPINES	534	(Indonesia) INDONESIA	531

=== Women's ===
Event	Gold		Silver		Bronze	
10 m air pistol	(Thailand) Tarunee Thientitihus	378 pts (rec)	(Indonesia) Lely Sampurno	376	(Singapore) Khatijah Surattee	365
Team air pistol	(Thailand) THAILAND	1.108 pts	(Indonesia) INDONESIA	1.098	(Malaysia) MALAYSIA	1.058
air rifle	(Thailand) Thiranun Jinda	370 pts (rec)	(Philippines) Arminda Vallejo	367	(Indonesia) Sri Suharti	360
Team air pistol	(Thailand) THAILAND	1.099 pts (rec)	(Philippines) PHILIPPINES	1.082	(Indonesia) INDONESIA	1.056

== Medal table ==
Rank	Nation	Gold	Silver	Bronze	Total
1	Thailand (THA)	16	5	1	22
2	Malaysia (MAS)	3	1	4	8
3	Philippines (PHI)	2	9	5	16
4	Singapore (SIN)	2	3	7	12
5	Indonesia (INA)	0	5	5	10
6	Burma (BIR)	0	0	1	1
Totals (6 entries)		23	23	23	69
