= Fencing at the 1987 SEA Games =

Fencing events at the 1987 Southeast Asian Games was held between 10 September to 15 September at Hall A Senayan.

== Medal summary ==
=== Men ===
Event	Gold	Silver	Bronze
Individual foil	(Indonesia) Alkindi	(Indonesia) Dida Irawan	(Singapore) Ronald Tan (Singapore) Adrian Lee
Team foil	(Indonesia) INDONESIA	(Philippines) PHILIPPINES	(Singapore) SINGAPORE
Individual sabre	(Philippines) Percival Alger	(Philippines) Alex Santos	(Indonesia) Ganefiono Suratmin (Singapore) Tan Yew Seng
Team sabre	(Indonesia) INDONESIA	(Singapore) SINGAPORE	(Philippines) PHILIPPINES
Individual épée	(Indonesia) Hadi Suroso	(Singapore) Ronald Tan	(Indonesia) Johisoa Mauwa
Team épée	(Indonesia) INDONESIA	(Singapore) SINGAPORE	(Philippines) PHILIPPINES

=== Women's ===
Event	Gold	Silver	Bronze
Individual foil	(Indonesia) Silvia Koeswandi	(Indonesia) Sumiani	(Singapore) Chan Lai Ong (Singapore) Choy Fong Leng
Team foil	(Indonesia) INDONESIA	(Singapore) SINGAPORE	(Philippines) PHILIPPINES

== Medal table ==
Rank	Nation	Gold	Silver	Bronze	Total
1	Indonesia (INA)	7	2	2	11
2	Philippines (PHI)	1	2	3	6
3	Singapore (SIN)	0	4	5	9
Totals (3 entries)		8	8	10	26
