= Cycling at the 1987 SEA Games =

The cycling at the 1987 SEA Games result, from 10 September until 19 September 1987.

== Medal summary ==
=== Men ===
Event	Gold		Silver		Bronze	
1000 m Individual trial	(Philippines) Bernardo Rimarim	1:09.67	(Indonesia) Puspita Mustika Adya	1:09.88	(Malaysia) Rosman Alwi	1:11.18
100 km Team trial	Indonesia Ian Tanuwijaya; Ronny Yahya; Robby Yahya; Ungut Ong Kim Hong	2hr:19:18.25	Thailand Kajohnsak Kongpu; Pongsak Sanlom; Taksin Sornsuth; Somchai Buapet	2:21:10.45	Malaysia Murugayan Kumaresan; Khairul Fazal; Tai Cheng Hai; Chen Choong Ming	2:21:36.24
4000 m Individual pursuit	(Philippines) Joselito Santos	2:25.10	(Philippines) Marcellino Delica	3:06.28	(Singapore) Kenneth Tan	5:16.91
Pursuit Team	(Philippines) PHILIPPINES	3:57.88	(Malaysia) MALAYSIA	4:10.34	(Indonesia) INDONESIA	4:26.45
1000 m Individual sprint	(Malaysia) Rosman Alwi	11.45	(Indonesia) Puspita Mustika Adya	11:60	(Philippines) Dayanan Feliciano	11.99
30 km point race	(Malaysia) Murugayan Kumaresan	56pts	(Philippines) Santos Joseito	41	(Malaysia) Ishak Amin	39
2nd stage Tour de Sea Games Team	(Indonesia) INDONESIA	15hr:45:05.01	(Malaysia) MALAYSIA	15:52:00.34	(Philippines) PHILIPPINES	16:03:54.21
2nd stage Tour de Sea Games	(Malaysia) Murugayan Kumaresan	3hr:52:18.17	(Malaysia) Chen Choong Ming	3:52:50.15	(Indonesia) Ronny Yahya	3:54:54.88
Tour de Sea Games Team	(Indonesia) INDONESIA	31hr:12:26.91	(Malaysia) MALAYSIA	1:09.88	(Philippines) PHILIPPINES	1:11.18
General ClassTour de Sea Games	(Malaysia) Murugayan Kumaresan	7hr:41:09.71	(Indonesia) Ronny Yahya	7:43:45.43		

=== Women ===
Event	Gold		Silver		Bronze	
51.7 km Road race	(Indonesia) Rida Farida	1hr:27:25.33	(Thailand) Somjit Kongram	1:27:26.50	(Thailand) Chamchian	1:27:35.33

== Medal table ==
Rank	Nation	Gold	Silver	Bronze	Total
1	Malaysia (MAS)	4	4	3	11
2	Indonesia (INA)	4	3	2	9
3	Philippines (PHI)	3	2	3	8
4	Thailand (THA)	0	2	1	3
5	Singapore (SIN)	0	0	1	1
Totals (5 entries)		11	11	10	32
