= Kelly Chan =

Kelly Chan may refer to:

- Kelly Chan (windsurfer) (1956–1998), Singaporean windsurfer
- Kelly Chen (born 1972), or Chan, Hong Kong singer-actress
