= Pencak silat at the 1987 SEA Games =

The Pencak Silat at the 1987 Southeast Asian Games was held between 14 September to 17 September at TMII, Jakarta.

== Medal summary ==
=== Men ===
Event	Gold	Silver	Bronze
45 kg	(Malaysia) Mohd Rafee Yakub	(Indonesia) Dedi Marani	(Brunei) Edros Mayalin
55 kg	(Indonesia) Joko Widodo	(Singapore) Mohd Anwar Abdul Aziz	(Malaysia) Ahmad Wardi Salim
Class C	(Malaysia) Ahmad Khuesaeri	(Indonesia) Faisal Mahyuddin	(Singapore) Asman Amat
Class D	(Indonesia) Darul Wisnu	(Malaysia) Zakri Ibrahim	(Singapore) Asrin Abdul Rahim
Class E	(Indonesia) Biari	(Malaysia) Abdul Razak Ibrahim	(Singapore) Zakaria Daud
Class F	(Brunei) Zabidi Ali	(Indonesia) Tony Widjaya	(Malaysia) Ahmad Fandi Othman
Class G	(Indonesia) I Wayan Muda	(Thailand) Bordintra Klaimanee	(Malaysia) Wan Mohd Aminuddin Baki
Class H	(Indonesia) I Wayan Muda	(Brunei) Durahman	(Malaysia) Azam Haji Abbas
Class I	(Indonesia) Sarno	(Brunei) Wong Eng Bu	(Malaysia) Fauzi Abdul Aziz
Free Class	(Indonesia) Oong Sumaryono	(Brunei) Mohd Rhusdi Abdullah	(Malaysia) Azam Abdullah

=== Women's ===
Event	Gold	Silver	Bronze
40–45 kg	(Singapore) Hazrah Khanam	(Indonesia) Rina Widayati	(Malaysia) Khatijah Salleh
Class B (45 kg)	(Indonesia) Tri Wahyuni Waidjan	(Singapore) Badriah Hosni	(Malaysia) Salbiah Salleh
Class C (55 kg)	(Indonesia) Nuryani Hamid	(Thailand) Manit Sookaw	(Brunei) Yuszarinah Yusoff
Class D (60 kg)	(Indonesia) Ni Made Wahyuni	(Thailand) Sopis Srivisat	
Class E (65 kg)	(Indonesia) Elvina Lumban Raja	(Malaysia) Zaleha Suradi	
