= Judo at the 1987 SEA Games =

Judo competition

The Judo at the 1987 Southeast Asian Games was held between 11 September to 15 September at Senayan Sports Complex.

== Medal summary ==
=== Men ===
Event	Gold	Silver	Bronze
Below 65 kg	(Thailand) Yosoont Boonyaleka	(Indonesia) Jumantoro	(Singapore) Tan Soon Onn
Extra-light (+60 kg)	(Philippines) Jerry Dino	(Myanmar) Tail Jein	(Indonesia) Agus Priyono Salim
Half-light (60–65 kg)	(Thailand) Yosoont Boonyaleka	(Indonesia) Jumantoro	(Singapore) Tan Soon Onn
Light (65–71 kg)	(Indonesia) Bambang Prakarsa	(Singapore) Edmond Tan	(Thailand) K. Polsak
Half-middle (71–78 kg)	(Philippines) Andrea Macion	(Myanmar) Than Maung	(Indonesia) Liber Sianthri
Middle (78–86 kg)	(Thailand) Hussabo Rajachaniva	(Indonesia) Liber Sianturi	(Philippines) Oscar Bautista
Below 71 kg	(Indonesia) Bambang Prakarsa	(Singapore) Tan Yoke Ban	(Thailand) T. Panulsukk
Below 95 kg	(Indonesia) Hengky Titral	(Thailand) C. Supot	(Myanmar) Than Htay
Above 95 kg	(Singapore) Ho Yen Chye	(Philippines) Rene McNremmy	(Indonesia) Perrence Pantouw
Open	(Indonesia) Perrence Pantouw	(Indonesia) Ceto Cosadek	(Singapore) Ho Yen Chye (Myanmar) Than Maung

=== Women ===
Event	Gold	Silver	Bronze
Up to 48 kg	(Thailand) Piraya Sontanaluck	(Indonesia) Yeni Idayani	(Myanmar) Than Than Tin
Below 53 kg	(Myanmar) Kiu Kiu Myint	(Thailand) Prateet Sirima	(Singapore) Chua Cheng Nei
Half-light (48–52 kg)	(Myanmar) Kyi Kyi Wai	(Thailand) Prateet Sirima	(Singapore) Chua Cheng Nei
Below 56 kg	(Indonesia) Enny Tri Astuti	(Thailand) Y. Lamain	(Myanmar) See See Myint
Light (52–56 kg)	(Indonesia) Enny Tri Astuti	(Thailand) Lani Yardthong	(Myanmar) Hla Hla Mint
Half-middle (56–61 kg)	(Myanmar) Thant Phyu Phyu	(Indonesia) Erna Puspitawati	only two competitors
Half-middle (61–66 kg)	(Indonesia) Helena Papilaya	(Thailand) Somporn Yompdakdee	only two competitors
Below 73 kg	(Myanmar) Khin Mu Mu	(Indonesia) Pujawati Utama	(Thailand) Soonluk
Above 73 kg	(Thailand) Supatra Yompakdee	(Indonesia) Joice Rumampuk	
Open	(Indonesia) Helena Papilaya	(Indonesia) Ida Iriani	(Myanmar) Thant Phyu Phyu (Singapore) Chua Cheng Nei

== Medal table ==
Rank	Nation	Gold	Silver	Bronze	Total
1	Indonesia (INA)	8	9	3	20
2	Thailand (THA)	5	6	3	14
3	Myanmar (MYA)	4	2	6	12
4	Philippines (PHI)	2	1	1	4
5	Singapore (SIN)	1	2	5	8
Totals (5 entries)		20	20	18	58
