= Gymnastics at the 1987 SEA Games =

Gymnastics events at the 1987 Southeast Asian Games was held between 10 September to 12 September at Senayan Convention Center.

== Medal summary ==
=== Men ===
Event	Gold		Silver		Bronze	
All-round	(Thailand) Teeruch Poparnich	54.55 pts	(Indonesia) Jonathan Sianturi	53.40	(Thailand) Sunan Teinrujang	50.15
Floor exercise	(Indonesia) Jonathan Sianturi	17.85 pts	(Thailand) Prawut Sititukuthai	17.65	(Philippines) Sergio Jasareno	17.50
Horizontal bars	(Indonesia) Jonathan Sianturi	18.500 pts	(Thailand) Teeruch Poparnich	18.499	(Thailand) Chan Prampan	17.600
Parallel bars	(Thailand) Teeruch Poparnich	18.450 pts	(Singapore) Sing Hwa Liew	17.350	(Indonesia) Jefri Reza Sanger	16.950
Pommel horse	(Thailand) Prawut Sititukuthai	15.95 pts	(Philippines) Sergio Jasareno	15.45	(Philippines) Rommel Kong	15.00
Rings	(Thailand) Teeruch Poparnich	17.90 pts	(Indonesia) Jonathan Sianturi	17.75	(Thailand) Sunan Teinrujang	17.10
Vaults	(Philippines) Alexander Tolentino	18.175 pts	(Thailand) Prawut Sititukuthai	17.850	(Philippines) Sergio Jasareno	17.850
Men's Team	Thailand	253.80 pts	Indonesia	243.05	Philippines	229.85

=== Women's ===
Event	Gold		Silver		Bronze	
Individual	(Philippines) Bea Lucero	37.355 pts	(Indonesia) Eva Butarbutar	36.60	(Indonesia) Hesty Dewayanti	36.20
Balance beam	(Philippines) Bea Lucero	18.650 pts	(Indonesia) Eva Butarbutar	18.100	(Indonesia) Hesty Dewayanti	17.750
Floor Exercise	(Indonesia) Esther Christanti	19.050 pts	(Philippines) Bea Lucero	18.950	(Indonesia) Eva Butarbutar	18.300
Uneven bars	(Indonesia) Hesty Dewayanti	18.850 pts	(Indonesia) Woro Werdaningsih	18.200	(Thailand) Jidapa Srimuang	15.900
Vaults	(Indonesia) Eva Butarbutar	19.025 pts	(Philippines) Bea Lucero	18.800	(Indonesia) Esther Christanti	18.550
Women's Team	Indonesia	178.10 pts	Philippines	169.80	Thailand	152.50

== Medal table ==
Rank	Nation	Gold	Silver	Bronze	Total
1	Indonesia (INA)	6	6	5	17
2	Thailand (THA)	5	3	5	13
3	Philippines (PHI)	3	4	4	11
4	Singapore (SIN)	0	1	0	1
Totals (4 entries)		14	14	14	42
