= Canoeing at the 1987 SEA Games =

Canoeing events at the 1987 Southeast Asian Games was held between 11 September to 17 September at Jatiluhur sport centre.

== Medal summary ==
=== Men's ===
Event	Gold	Silver	Bronze
Kayak I	(Indonesia) Yanson	(Indonesia) Bambang Kusumowijoyo	(Singapore) Lim Kwee Yan
Kayak I (1,000 m)	(Indonesia) Yanson	(Singapore) Goh Poh Soon	(Indonesia) Subandi
Kayak II	(Indonesia) Subandi (Indonesia) Bambang Kusumowijoyo	(Indonesia) Ramli Umar (Indonesia) Baco Ahmad	(Singapore) Lim Kwee Yan (Singapore) Tan Yew Guan
Kayak II (1,000 m)	(Indonesia) Yanson (Indonesia) Wage Waromi	(Indonesia) Subandi (Indonesia) Bambang Kusumowijoyo	(Singapore) Goh Poh Soon (Singapore) Lim Wee Teck
Single Sculls	(Indonesia) Leopold Luntungan	(Singapore) Liem Kiat Chuan	(Philippines) Benjamin Ramos
Oars coxed (2,000 m)	Indonesia	Singapore	Philippines
Oars coxed (3,000 m)	Indonesia	Philippines	Singapore
10 rowers (2,000 m)	Indonesia	Thailand	Brunei Darussalam
20 rowers (2,000 m)	Indonesia	Brunei Darussalam	Thailand

=== Women's ===
Event	Gold	Silver	Bronze
Kayak I	(Indonesia) Jumina	(Indonesia) Hasimah	(Singapore) Lee Lay Bay
Kayak II	(Indonesia) Jumina (Indonesia) Hasimah	(Singapore) Tan Boon Pheng (Singapore) Tan Geok Lan	(Indonesia) Ardi Subekti (Indonesia) Salmah
2,000 m sculls	(Indonesia) Suparmi	(Singapore) Magdalene Lim	

== Medal table ==
Rank	Nation	Gold	Silver	Bronze	Total
1	Indonesia (INA)	12	4	2	18
2	Singapore (SIN)	0	5	5	10
3	Philippines (PHI)	0	1	2	3
4	Brunei (BRU)	0	1	1	2
4	Thailand (THA)	0	1	1	2
Totals (5 entries)		12	12	11	35
