= Wrestling at the 1987 SEA Games =

List of Wrestling events at the 1987 Southeast Asian Games

Wrestling events at the 1987 Southeast Asian Games was held between 10 September to 12 September at Grogol Youth Center.

== Medal summary ==
=== Freestyle Men ===
Event	Gold	Silver	Bronze
(-48 kg)	(Indonesia) Suryadi Gunawan	(Philippines) Luis Tibon	(Cambodia) Sri Lakhana
(-52 kg)	(Indonesia) Sukarman	(Philippines) Filippe Escote	(Cambodia) Teng Bun
(-68 kg)	(Indonesia) Indra Safri	(Philippines) Juan Tauro	only two competitors
(-82 kg)	(Indonesia) Edi Santoso	(Philippines) Antonio Dime	(Philippines) Jose Mari Bereciarte
(100 kg)	(Indonesia) Sudirman	(Philippines) Jose Mari Bereciarte	only two competitors

=== Greco Roman Men ===
Event	Gold	Silver	Bronze
(-48 kg)	(Indonesia) Suryadi Gunawan	(Philippines) Elmer Alegrado	only two competitors
(-57 kg)	(Indonesia) Sukarman	(Cambodia) Teng Bun	only two competitors
(-68 kg)	(Indonesia) Rusdi	(Philippines) Juan Tauro	only two competitors
(-82 kg)	(Indonesia) Edi Santoso	(Philippines) Antonio Dime	only two competitors
(-100 kg)	(Indonesia) Sudirman	(Philippines) Jose Bereciarte	only two competitors
