= Sailing at the 1987 SEA Games =

The Sailing at the 1987 Southeast Asian Games was held between 15 September to 18 September at Ancol Sports Complex.

== Medal summary ==
=== Men's ===
==== Yachting ====
Event	Gold	Silver	Bronze
Trick Elimination	(Indonesia) Rahardjo Priambodo	(Singapore) William Teo	(Indonesia) Devy Tulong

==== Boardsailing ====
Event	Gold	Silver	Bronze
470	(Singapore) Siew Shaw Her (Singapore) Joe Chan	(Thailand) Panasarn Hasdin (Thailand) Kevin Whitcraft	(Malaysia) Chu Say Ng (Malaysia) Khaw Seng Khoon
Enterprise	(Malaysia) Mohd Khairuddin (Malaysia) Aman Tulos	(Indonesia) Sujatmiko Suprapto (Indonesia) Ujang Supriatna	(Thailand) Vinai Vongtim (Thailand) Oaychai Choompuvises
Laser	(Indonesia) T. Santi	(Malaysia) Puasa Slamat	(Indonesia) S. Benny
Optimist	(Indonesia) Dipo Subagyo	(Thailand) Tosaporn Painupong	(Malaysia) Elya Dato Shariff
Cadet	(Thailand) Damrongsak Vongtim (Thailand) Biranubonges Bhanubanhd	(Indonesia) Joko Suprapto (Indonesia) Kusdiana Adi	(Singapore) Cho Tae Wei (Singapore) Paul Khor
Sailboards	(Thailand) Somchai Imsap	(Indonesia) Miki Sampelan	(Singapore) Lorgan Wong
Sailboards Div 2	(Thailand) Panyawan Leksaard	(Indonesia) Abdul Malik Faisal	(Malaysia) Yeap Leong Soon
Mistral SST	(Thailand) Anan Hohsuwan	(Singapore) Kelly Chan	(Philippines) Richard Paz

=== Women's ===
==== Yachting ====
Event	Gold	Silver	Bronze
Trick Elimination	(Indonesia) Baiq Herawati Aisyah	(Indonesia) Nunik Nurdiaty	(Indonesia) Baiq Yolanda Sari

== Medal table ==
Rank	Nation	Gold	Silver	Bronze	Total
1	Indonesia (INA)	4	5	3	12
2	Thailand (THA)	4	2	1	7
3	Singapore (SIN)	1	2	2	5
4	Malaysia (MAS)	1	1	2	4
5	Philippines (PHI)	0	0	1	1
Totals (5 entries)		10	10	9	29
