= Shooting at the 1987 SEA Games =

Shooting events at the 1987 Southeast Asian Games were held between 10 September to 17 September at Senayan Sports Complex.

== Medal table ==
| Rank | Nation | Gold | Silver | Bronze | Total |
|---|---|---|---|---|---|
| 1 | Thailand (THA) | 20 | 5 | 1 | 26 |
| 2 | Indonesia (INA) | 7 | 14 | 3 | 24 |
| 3 | Philippines (PHI) | 4 | 4 | 14 | 22 |
| 4 | Malaysia (MAS) | 1 | 5 | 8 | 14 |
| 5 | Singapore (SIN) | 0 | 4 | 5 | 9 |
| 6 | Burma (BIR) | 0 | 0 | 1 | 1 |
| Totals (6 entries) | | 32 | 32 | 32 | 96 |

== Medal summary ==
=== Men ===
| Event | Gold | | Silver | | Bronze | |
|---|---|---|---|---|---|---|
| Individual air rifle | (Thailand) Manop Leeprasansakul | 570 pts | (Indonesia) Andi Hedrata | 568 | (Philippines) Ernesto Roldan | 567 |
| Team air rifle | (Thailand) THAILAND | 1.704 pts | (Indonesia) INDONESIA | 1.703 | (Philippines) PHILIPPINES | 1.680 |
| Air pistol | (Indonesia) Alfian Sitompul | 570 pts | (Singapore) Chia Hock San | 568 | (Myanmar) Bo Shoo | 567 |
| Team air pistol 25m | (Thailand) THAILAND | 1.693 pts | (Indonesia) INDONESIA | 1.692 | (Malaysia) MALAYSIA | 1.659 |
| Free rifle 50m | (Thailand) Thanin Thaisilpa | 1.130 pts | (Philippines) Julius Valdez | 1.124 | (Malaysia) Jasni Shaari | 1.121 |
| Team Free rifle 50m | (Philippines) PHILIPPINES | 3.349 pts | (Thailand) THAILAND | 3.335 | (Malaysia) MALAYSIA | 3.290 |
| Small bore free rifle | (Philippines) Julius Valdez | 583 pts | (Malaysia) Abdul Rahman Mejar | 581 | (Thailand) Chira Prabandhayodhin | 580 |
| Team Small bore free rifle | (Philippines) PHILIPPINES | 1.739 pts | (Thailand) THAILAND | 1.736 | (Indonesia) INDONESIA | 1.729 |
| Clay Target | (Indonesia) Gilbert Sumendap | 210 pts | (Malaysia) Peter Lim | 208 | (Singapore) Tan Been Huat | 205 |
| Free pistol | (Thailand) Tawid Chinbunchorn | 539 pts | (Indonesia) Boy Riswanto | 539 | (Malaysia) Sabiahmad Abdullah Ahad | 535 |
| Team Free Pistol | (Indonesia) INDONESIA | 1.593 pts | (Thailand) THAILAND | 1.583 | (Malaysia) MALAYSIA* | 1.550 |
| Fire pistol | (Malaysia) Sabiahmad Abdullah Ahad | 585 pts | (Philippines) Nathaniel Padilla | 581 | (Thailand) B. Vutiphagdee | 578 |
| Team Free Pistol | (Thailand) THAILAND | 1.727 pts | (Malaysia) MALAYSIA | 1.705 | (Indonesia) INDONESIA | 1.698 |
| Standard Pistol (25 shots) | (Thailand) Opas Ruengpanyawut | 566 pts (rec) | (Malaysia) Sabiahmad Abdullah Ahad | 557 | (Indonesia) Suharyono Wisnu | 551 |
| Team Standard Pistol (25 shots) | (Thailand) THAILAND | 1.676 pts (rec) | (Indonesia) INDONESIA | 1.638 | (Malaysia) MALAYSIA | 1.609 |
| Standard Pistol (60 shots) | (Thailand) Opas Ruengpanyawut | 566 pts (rec) | (Malaysia) Sabiahmad Abdullah Ahad | 557 | (Philippines) Nathaniel Padilla | 551 |
| Team Standard Pistol (60 shots) | (Thailand) THAILAND | 1.676 pts | (Indonesia) INDONESIA | 1.638 | (Philippines) PHILIPPINES | 1.014 |
| Running bear | (Indonesia) Budi Winoto | 500 pts | (Singapore) Tan Been Huat | 446 | (Philippines) Jaime Gracio | 439 |
| Mixed runs | (Indonesia) Tjilik Sandiwijaya | 335 pts | (Philippines) Jaime Gracio | 297 | (Singapore) Gan Teck Lee | 290 |
| Team mixed runs | (Indonesia) INDONESIA | 972 pts | (Philippines) PHILIPPINES | 737 | (Singapore) SINGAPORE | 719 |
| Rapid fire | (Philippines) Nathaniel Padilla | 580 pts | (Singapore) Kweek See Siong | 569 | (Malaysia) Lam Wah Kiong | 560 |
| Team rapid fire | (Thailand) THAILAND | 1.730 pts | (Philippines) PHILIPPINES | 1.719 | (Malaysia) MALAYSIA | 1.706 |
| Clay skeet (150 shots) | (Thailand) Somchai Chanatavanich | 214 pts | (Malaysia) Vincent Theo | 209 | (Singapore) Tang Kee Kong | 204 |
| Team clay skeet (150 shots) | (Malaysia) MALAYSIA | 402 pts | (Thailand) THAILAND | 396 | (Singapore) SINGAPORE | 388 |
| Team TRAP | (Singapore) SINGAPORE | 404 | (Malaysia) MALAYSIA | 397 | (Indonesia) INDONESIA | 393 |

=== Women ===
| Event | Gold | | Silver | | Bronze | |
|---|---|---|---|---|---|---|
| Air rifle | (Thailand) Thiranun Jinda | 386 pts | (Indonesia) Sylvia Gani | 381 | (Philippines) Marilu Samaco | 376 |
| Team Air rifle | (Thailand) THAILAND | 1.118 | (Indonesia) INDONESIA | 1.115 | (Philippines) PHILIPPINES | 1.096 |
| Air pistol | (Thailand) Promthida Chakshuraksha | 381 pts | (Singapore) Khatijah Surattee | 375 | (Indonesia) Selvyana Adrian Sofyan | 372 |
| Team air pistol | (Thailand) THAILAND | 1.123 pts | (Indonesia) INDONESIA | 1.105 | (Philippines) PHILIPPINES (Malaysia) MALAYSIA | |
| Sport pistol | (Indonesia) Lely Sampoerno | 579 pts | (Thailand) Rumfai Yamfang | 575 | (Philippines) Mimi De Castro | 556 |
| Team sport pistol | (Thailand) THAILAND | 1.714 pts | (Indonesia) INDONESIA | 1.712 | (Philippines) PHILIPPINES | 1.667 |
| Small bore free rifle | (Thailand) Thiranun Jinda | 579 pts | (Indonesia) Sri Suharti | 578 | (Philippines) Gemma Javison | 573 |
| Team small bore free rifle | (Thailand) THAILAND | 1.735 pts | (Indonesia) INDONESIA | 1.712 | (Philippines) PHILIPPINES | 1.704 |
| Small bore 3 positions | (Thailand) Kanokwan Krittakom | 562 pts | (Indonesia) Susi Supardi | 557 | (Philippines) Marilu Samaco | 546 |
| Team small bore 3 positions | (Thailand) THAILAND | 1.672 pts | (Indonesia) INDONESIA | 1.616 | (Philippines) PHILIPPINES | 1.607 |
