= Bodybuilding at the 1987 SEA Games =

The Bodybuilding at the 1987 Southeast Asian Games was held between 15 September to 16 September at Senayan Convention Hall.

== Medal summary ==
=== Men ===
Event	Gold	Silver	Bronze
Bantam weight	(Singapore) Ibrahim Sihat	(Indonesia) Bachtiar Zarmi	(Malaysia) Bujang Taha
Light weight	(Indonesia) Levi Rumbewas	(Singapore) Ramli Hussein	(Philippines) Abesamis David
Welter weight	(Singapore) Fatholomein Ali	(Malaysia) Mohd Isa Mohd Zukri	(Philippines) Renato Dio
Middle weight	(Singapore) Hashim Salim	(Philippines) Garzon Abraham	(Malaysia) Teh Ah Fook
Light-heavy weight	(Philippines) Sammy Ayachok	(Singapore) Johnny Ong	(Indonesia) Benny Cipta Wijaya

== Medal table ==
Rank	Nation	Gold	Silver	Bronze	Total
1	Singapore (SIN)	3	2	0	5
2	Philippines (PHI)	1	1	2	4
3	Indonesia (INA)	1	1	1	3
4	Malaysia (MAS)	0	1	2	3
Totals (4 entries)		5	5	5	15
