= Kelly Chan (windsurfer) =

Singaporean windsurfer (1956–1998)

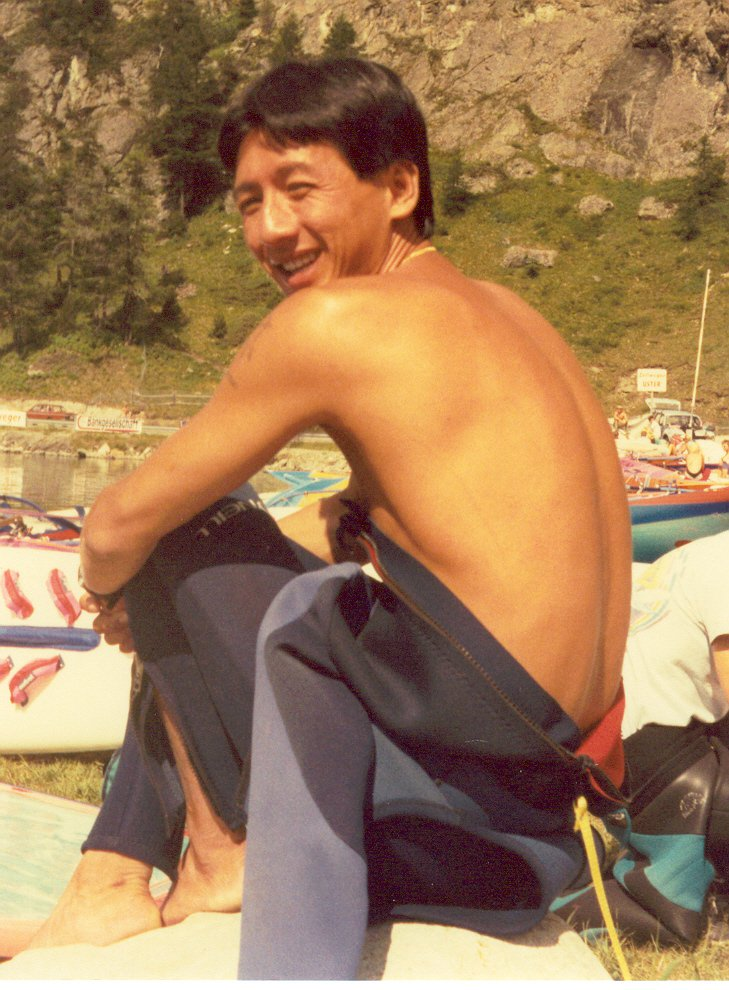
- Kelly Chan sits and shares a joke with friends, while waiting for the wind. Mistral World Championships 1986, Lake Silvaplana. Photo: Francesca Vincenti, Malta

Personal information
- Full name: Kelly Chan Kum Seng
- Nationality: Singapore
- Born: 15 December 1956 Singapore
- Died: 27 August 1998 (aged 41) Singapore
- Height: 1.74 m (5 ft 9 in)
- Weight: 66 kg (146 lb)

Sport
- Country: Singapore
- Sport: Windsurfing
- Club: East Coast Sailing Club

Achievements and titles
- Highest world ranking: 1st (Raceboard Lightweight; March 1992)
Medal record
Men's sailing
Representing Singapore
Southeast Asian Games
Silver medal – second place	1987 Jakarta	Mistral SST

Kelly Chan Kum Seng (Chinese: 陈金星; pinyin: Chén Jīnxīng; 15 December 1956 – 27 August 1998) was a Singaporean windsurfer. He was ranked number one in the Raceboard Lightweight class by the International Boardsailing Association in 1992. Chan represented Singapore from 1982 to 1997, winning several regional championships including a gold, a silver and two bronze medals at the Southeast Asian Games. He was ranked 35th in a list of Singapore's 50 Greatest Athletes of the Century by The Straits Times in 1999.

== Windsurfing career ==
Chan picked up windsurfing from his colleagues at a relatively late age in 1981. He did not undergo formal coaching, learning the sport from friends and through practice instead. A year later, he won his first regional championship, emerging winner of the heavyweight division at the Siam World Cup. At the 1983 Southeast Asian Games, Chan finished fourth in the International Windglider.

In 1984, Chan was ranked first in the lightweight division and second overall in the inaugural Asia-Pacific Mistral Championship in Kuantan, Malaysia.

Chan was selected as the first sailor to represent Singapore in 24 years at the 1984 Summer Olympics in Los Angeles. In the debuting Windglider class, he finished 24th, 24th, 21st, 31st, 24th, 31st, 18th in seven races to place 26th overall out of 38 competitors.

At the 1985 Southeast Asian Games, Chan won a bronze medal in the King Cobra event. Two years later, he won a silver medal in the Semi-Funboard event at the 1987 Southeast Asian Games.

In 1988, Chan won the silver medal in the Division II boardsailing event at the Asian Yachting Federation Regatta in Jakarta.

Chan clinched Singapore's first ever boardsailing gold at the Southeast Asia Games when he won the Sailboard Division I event at the 1989 Southeast Asian Games.

In 1990, Chan was part of the Singapore team that came in second in the Super Finals of the Windsurf World Festival in Italy. Later in the year, he struggled with an unfamiliar sailboard as he finished 7th, 8th, 5th, 8th, 5th, 8th in the races at the 1990 Asian Games.

At the 1991 Southeast Asian Games, Chan placed fourth as he failed to defend his title.

1992 proved to be the defining year for Chan. At the beginning of January, he finished sixth at the Singapore Open. Later that month, he placed eighth in the Raceboard Lightweight Division at the International Boardsailing Association (IBSA) World Boardsailing Championships in Singapore; this was the first time that a Singaporean had finished top ten in a world championship. A couple of weeks later, he won four races and finished second in two other to win the Lightweight Raceboard class at the Siam World Cup. Chan's achievements meant that he topped IBSA Raceboard Lightweight rankings in March 1992. In May, he won all four races at the World Windsurfing Festival Spring Cup in Mondello, Sicily to emerge champion in his category.

At the 1993 Southeast Asian Games held in Singapore, Chan won a bronze medal in the Raceboard Lightweight Open event.

In July 1994, Chan won the European Masters title in Greece. Two months later, he won the Masters title at the World Boardsailing Championship in Canada.

Chan participated at the 1994 Asian Games but did not make any impact. He announced his retirement after the Games, in order to allow Singapore to groom new blood.

Although Chan was selected for the 1997 Southeast Asian Games, he withdrew his place as he felt he could not compete for the gold medal due to work and personal commitments affecting his training.

== Personal life ==
Chan was a regular serviceman who worked as an aircraft technician with the Republic of Singapore Air Force (RSAF). He rose to the rank of Second Warrant Officer.

Chan married company secretary Ann Chua in 1977; the couple have two sons. Elder son, Kelly Junior Chan Wye Chyn (b. June 1979), was also a national sailor and is a pilot. Second son, Keane Chan Guan Zhong (born 1985), is a financial analyst.

== Death ==
On 27 August 1998, Chan was returning to Pekanbaru Air Base during a military exercise in Indonesia, when he was involved in a fatal road crash. He was taken to the local base hospital for immediate treatment before being evacuated via military aircraft to Singapore, where he died from his injuries at Tan Tock Seng Hospital. His ashes were scattered around the Keta Beacon off the eastern coast of Singapore.

A new annual windsurfing marathon was named in honour of him in the same year.
