= Taekwondo at the 1987 SEA Games =

The Taekwondo at the 1987 SEA Games was held between 17 September to 19 September at Grogol Youth Centre.

== Medal summary ==
=== Men's ===
Event	Gold	Silver	Bronze
Fin weight	(Indonesia) D. R. Talumewo	(Malaysia) Low Kam Woe	(Singapore) Boo Koh Ceng Tua (Philippines) Arnold Baradi
Fly weight (50 kg)	(Indonesia) Budi Setiawan	(Thailand) Anan Meksawan	(Malaysia) Ramasamy Selvamuthu (Philippines) Robert Vargas
Bantam weight	(Philippines) Stephen Fernandez	(Indonesia) Abdul Rahman Kamisofa	(Singapore) Tok Moon Chua (Thailand) O. Borsuwan
Feather weight	(Thailand) Pairat Suteeratat	(Indonesia) Parto Kusumo	(Malaysia) Rahim Ahmad (Singapore) Siu Hung Quock
Light weight	(Philippines) Manuel del Rosario	(Malaysia) Moi Chee Keong	(Indonesia) Amril Yusam (Singapore) Ling Keng Hoo
Welter weight	(Indonesia) Lanting	(Philippines) Jesus Morales	(Singapore) Tee Liang Lian (Malaysia) Barry Voon
Middle weight	(Malaysia) Lee Yoke Yeong	(Philippines) Joel Berto	(Indonesia) J.J. Hungan (Singapore) Soon Kok Toh
Heavy weight	(Thailand) A. Rossawong	(Malaysia) Vijesh Kumar Raj	(Indonesia) Rinaldi (Philippines) Jose Ernesto Roque

=== Women's ===
Event	Gold	Silver	Bronze
Fin weight	(Indonesia) Ina S. Sari	(Malaysia) V. Maruthumuthu	
Fly weight	(Singapore) Wong Liang Ming	(Thailand) C. Supatorn	(Indonesia) Yenny Latief (Malaysia) Lisa Yong Po Po
Feather weight	(Indonesia) Anita Wongkah	(Philippines) Romyna Almeda	(Malaysia) Sarah Chung Pit Jin
Bantam weight	(Indonesia) Elvi Kusuma Haryati	(Thailand) Priyadh Chasukumura	(Singapore) Gak Lang Koh (Malaysia) Ng Kim Kee
Welter weight	(Malaysia) Joyce Ong	(Indonesia) Anis Dewi	(Philippines) Leah Zuniega (Singapore) Yong Lai Choo
Light weight	(Malaysia) Rosemary Yap	(Indonesia) Adewani Pingkan	

== Medal table ==
Rank	Nation	Gold	Silver	Bronze	Total
1	Indonesia (INA)	6	4	4	14
2	Malaysia (MAS)	3	4	6	13
3	Philippines (PHI)	2	3	4	9
4	Thailand (THA)	2	3	1	6
5	Singapore (SIN)	1	0	8	9
Totals (5 entries)		14	14	23	51
