= Chainarong Wangganon =

Thai sprinter

Personal information
- Nationality: Thai
- Born: 29 April 1970 (age 56)

Sport
- Sport: Sprinting
- Event: 4 × 100 metres relay
Medal record
Men's athletics
Representing Thailand
Southeast Asian Games
Gold medal – first place	1987 Jakarta	4 × 100m relay
Asian Junior Championships
Silver medal – second place	1988 Singapore	200m

Chainarong Wangganon (ชัยณรงค์•วังกานนท์; born 29 April 1970) is a Thai sprinter. He competed in the men's 4 × 100 metres relay at the 1988 Summer Olympics.
