= Dirdja Wihardja =

Indonesian weightlifter (born 1966)

Personal information
- Nationality: Indonesian
- Born: 10 August 1966 (age 60)

Sport
- Sport: Weightlifting

Dirdja Wihardja (born 10 August 1966) is an Indonesian weightlifter. He competed in the men's bantamweight event at the 1988 Summer Olympics. He later became a coach.
