= Nathaniel Padilla =

Filipino sports shooter

Personal information
- Nickname: Tac

Sport
- Sport: Shooting
- Event(s): Rapid fire, center fire and standard pistol
Medal record
Men's Shooting
Representing Philippines
Southeast Asian Games
Gold medal – first place	2009 Vientiane	Rapid fire
Gold medal – first place	1993 Singapore	Rapid fire
Gold medal – first place	1987 Jakarta	Rapid fire
Gold medal – first place	1983 Singapore	Rapid fire
Gold medal – first place	1979 Jakarta	Rapid fire
Silver medal – second place	2005 Manila	Rapid fire
Bronze medal – third place	1987 Jakarta	Standard pistol (60 shots)

Nathaniel "Tac" Padilla is a Filipino sports shooter.

== Career ==
He learned to use a pistol at age 9 and he was first known in the national sporting scene in 1976 when he became the junior champion of the rapid fire, center fire and standard pistol events at the Benito Juarez World Shooting Championships which was hosted in Mexico City.

He won five gold medals, all in the rapid pistol event at the Southeast Asian Games. He won in the aforementioned event at the 1979, 1983, 1987, 1993, and 2009 editions. He did not win any gold medal in the regional tournament for 16 years until he won at the rapid fire event at the 2009 Southeast Asian Games in Laos. By 2012, Padilla has competed 17 times for the Philippines in the regional tournament. He did not participate in the 1999 and 2013 Southeast Asian Games due to the non-contest of rapid fire pistol event in those two editions.

By January 2010, he has won in nine Southeast Asian Shooting championships and achieved more than a dozen silver and bronze tournaments in other continental tournaments.

== Personal life ==
His father was Olympic shooter Tom Ong and his siblings are Carolina, Kristine, Rose, Donald, and Jeffrey. He is also the general manager of Spring Cooking Oil, his family's business.

Padilla is married to Paola Montelibano with whom he has two children. His second daughter, Mica, is following in his footsteps, and has joined the sport.
