= Rosman Alwi =

Malaysian cyclist (born 1961)

Rosman Alwii
Personal information
- Born: 5 December 1961 (age 64) Kuala Lumpur, Malaysia

Cycling career
- Sport: Cycling

Rosman Alwi (born 5 December 1961) is a Malaysian former cyclist. He competed at the 1984 Summer Olympics and the 1988 Summer Olympics.

== Achievements ==
1983
Asian Cycling Championship - Bronze Medalist
1984
Olympic Games - 20th (1,000 metres Time Trial)
Olympic Games - 2 h5 r5/11 (Track Sprint)
1985
Sea Games - Gold Medalist
1987
Sea Games - Gold Medalist
1997
Sea Games - Gold Medalist
