= Nenita Adan =

Filipino athlete (born 1965)

Personal information
- Nationality: Filipino
- Born: July 4, 1965 (age 61) Libmanan, Camarines Sur, Philippines
- Height: 5 ft 3 in (160 cm)
- Weight: 108 lb (49 kg)

Sport
- Sport: Track and field
- Event: 400 metres hurdles
Medal record
Women's athletics
Representing Philippines
SEA Games
Gold medal – first place	1987 Jakarta	400m hurdles
Silver medal – second place	1987 Jakarta	4×400m relay

Nenita Rodella Adan (born July 4, 1965) is a Filipino hurdler. She competed in the women's 400 metres hurdles at the 1988 Summer Olympics. She also competed in the 1987 SEA Games and in a Makati marathon.

== Early life ==
She was born on July 4, 1965, in Camarines Sur. She was a sprinter in elementary school and competed in various competitions. Once, she entered the national Palarong Pambansa. She gained a scholarship at the Naga College Foundation. She enlisted in the Philippine Navy and became part of the national team.

== Sports career ==
She aspired to be in the SEA Games, being listed as one of the 27 Filipino participants taking part in the SEA games. She participated in the 1987 SEA Games representing the Philippines. She participated in Athletics at the 1987 SEA Games, gaining a gold medal in the 400-meter hurdles with a time of 1:00.38. She gained bronze in the 100-meter hurdles with a time of 14.75 seconds. She was part of the 26 Filipino athletes who were assured to be part of the Olympics. She participated in the 1988 Summer Olympics in Seoul. She participated in the Women's 400 meters hurdles in Athletics. She gained 7th, last place, in the second heat with a time of 1:01.92. In June 1987, she won third place in a marathon in Makati, bringing home P500.
