= Richard Paz =

Filipino windsurfer (born 1968)

Personal information
- Nationality: Filipino
- Born: November 2, 1968 (age 57) Mabini, Batangas, Philippines
- Height: 5 ft 6 in (168 cm)
- Weight: 130 lb (60 kg)

Sailing career
- Sport: Sailing
- Class(es): Lechner, Mistral
Medal record
Men's sailing
Representing Philippines
Southeast Asian Games
Bronze medal – third place	1987 Jakarta	Mistral SST

Richard Cuerdo Paz (born November 2, 1968) is a Filipino windsurfer. He competed at the 1988 Summer Olympics and the 1992 Summer Olympics.
