= Bowling at the 1987 SEA Games =

The Bowling at the 1987 SEA Games result. This event was held between 12 September to 16 September at the Ancol Bowling Centre.

== Medal table ==
Rank	Nation	Gold	Silver	Bronze	Total
1	Philippines (PHI)	7	1	3	11
2	Thailand (THA)	2	4	3	9
3	Singapore (SIN)	2	3	3	8
4	Malaysia (MAS)	1	1	1	3
5	Indonesia (INA)	0	3	3	6
Totals (5 entries)		12	12	13	37

== Medal summary ==
=== Men's ===
Event	Gold		Silver		Bronze	
All-Events	(Philippines) Paeng Nepomuceno	4.969 pts	(Singapore) Sam Goh	4.845	(Thailand) Chalit Duriaraksa	4.786
Masters	(Thailand) Chalit Duriaraksa		(Thailand) Saravut Maneerat		(Indonesia) Lizar Yahya	
Single's	(Philippines) Paeng Nepomuceno	1.258 pts	(Indonesia) Lizar Yahya	1.212	(Singapore) Jansen Chan	1.200
Double's	(Philippines) Paeng Nepomuceno; Delfin Garcia	2.424 pts	(Indonesia) Hendro Pranoto; Rudi Budianto	2.409	(Thailand) Phongchai Sai-Ngow; C. Duriyaraksa	2400
Trio's	(Singapore) SINGAPORE	3.902 pts	(Thailand) THAILAND	3.574	(Indonesia) INDONESIA	3.497
Five's	(Thailand) THAILAND	6.063 pts	(Singapore) SINGAPORE	5.847	(Philippines) PHILIPPINES	5.798

=== Women ===
Event	Gold		Silver		Bronze	
All-Events	(Philippines) Crystal Soberano	4,794	(Singapore) Adelene Wee	4,615	(Indonesia) Charlotte Syamsuddin	4,573
Masters	(Philippines) Crystal Soberano		(Philippines) Bong Coo		(Malaysia) Pearly Chong	
Singles	(Malaysia) Pearly Chong	1.239 pts	(Malaysia) Cheong Yee Fong	1.217	(Singapore) Katherine Lee (Philippines) Cathy Solis	1.115
Doubles	(Philippines) Crystal Soberano; Cecilia Gaffud	2.357 pts	(Indonesia) Charlotte Syamsuddin; Rachmah Ismail	2.307	(Thailand) Linna Kullavanijaya; Daroonprasith Thongterm	2.288
Trios	(Philippines) PHILIPPINES; Bong Coo; Crystal Soberano; Cecilia Gaffud	3,631	(Thailand) THAILAND; Linna Kullavanijaya; Daroonprasith Thongterm; Sukkasung Sudaomying	3,448	(Singapore) SINGAPORE; Adelene Wee; Katherine Lee; Grace Young	3,419
Team of Five	(Singapore) SINGAPORE	5.609 pts	(Thailand) THAILAND	5.547	(Philippines) PHILIPPINES	5.489
