= Sorie Enda Nasution =

Indonesian weightlifter

Personal information
- Nationality: Indonesian
- Born: 28 August 1958 (age 66)

Sport
- Sport: Weightlifting

Sorie Enda Nasution (born 28 August 1958) is an Indonesian weightlifter. He competed in the men's featherweight event at the 1984 Summer Olympics.
