= Sann Myint =

Burmese weightlifter

Personal information
- Nationality: Burmese
- Born: 24 March 1952 (age 73)

Sport
- Sport: Weightlifting

Sann Myint (born 24 March 1952) is a Burmese weightlifter. He competed in the men's middle heavyweight event at the 1980 Summer Olympics.
