= Ramon Solis =

Filipino weightlifter (born 1960)

Ramón Solis
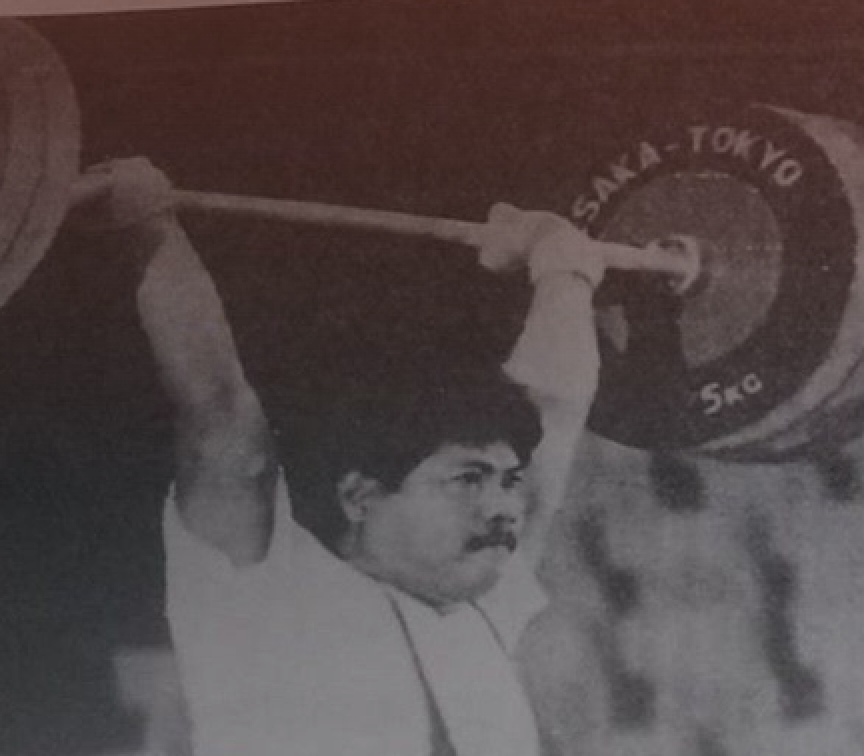
- Solis at a weightlifting competition

Personal information
- Born: 8 July 1960 (age 65) Cebu, Philippines

Sport
- Country: Philippines
- Sport: Weightlifting
- Retired: 1998
- Now coaching: Hidilyn Diaz, Elreen Ando
Medal record
Representing the Philippines
Event	1st	2nd	3rd
Southeast Asian Games	11	3	2
Total	11	3	2

Ramón Solis (born 8 July 1960) is a Filipino weightlifter. He has represented the Philippines internationally from 1975 to 1998. He won several medals in the Southeast Asian Games from 1977 to 1997. He won gold medals in 1981, 1983, 1985, 1987, 1989 and 1991 in the Southeast Asian Games. He competed in the men's middle heavyweight event at the 1988 Summer Olympics. He has also competed at the 1998 Asian Games in the men's 105 kg event.

Solis is also the head coach for the Philippine weightlifting team multiple times with his latest tenure as coach starting in August 2019. He has coached the national weightlifting team at the Southeast Asian Games in four occasions with the first being the 2005 edition and the 2019 edition being the last. Among the weightlifters he coached includes Olympians Hidilyn Diaz and Elreen Ando. He also has coached the varsity weightlifting teams of the University of Cebu and the University of San Jose-Recoletos.

He is also among the coaches involved in the selection of weightlifters that represented that Philippines at the 2017 Summer Universiade in Taipei.
