= Josephine Mary Singarayar =

Malaysian sprinter

Personal information
- Nationality: Malaysian
- Born: 29 June 1967 (age 59) Ipoh, Perak, Malaysia
- Height: 168 cm (5 ft 6 in)
- Weight: 50 kg (110 lb)

Sport
- Sport: Sprinting
- Event: 400 metres
Medal record
Women's athletics
Representing Malaysia
Asian Games
Bronze medal – third place	1986 Seoul	800 m
Bronze medal – third place	1990 Beijing	4×400 m
Asian Championships
Silver medal – second place	1991 Kuala Lumpur	400 m
Bronze medal – third place	1989 New Delhi	400 m
Bronze medal – third place	1993 Manila	4×400 m

Josephine Mary Singarayar (born 29 June 1967) is a Malaysian sprinter. She competed in the women's 400 metres at the 1988 Summer Olympics.
