= Warino Lestanto =

Indonesian weightlifter

Personal information
- Nationality: Indonesian
- Born: 12 November 1952 (age 72)

Sport
- Sport: Weightlifting

Warino Lestanto (born 12 November 1952) is an Indonesian weightlifter. He competed in the men's lightweight event at the 1976 Summer Olympics.
