= Maman Suryaman =

Indonesian weightlifter (born 1962)

Personal information
- Nationality: Indonesian
- Born: 2 November 1962 (age 63) Bandung, Indonesia

Sport
- Sport: Weightlifting

Maman Suryaman (born 2 November 1962) is an Indonesian former weightlifter. He competed in the men's flyweight event at the 1984 Summer Olympics.
