= Chua Koon Siong =

Singaporean weightlifter

Personal information
- Nationality: Singaporean
- Born: 27 August 1948 (age 76)

Sport
- Sport: Weightlifting

Chua Koon Siong (born 27 August 1948) is a Singaporean former weightlifter. He competed in the men's featherweight event at the 1976 Summer Olympics.
