= Percival Alger =

Filipino fencer

Personal information
- Born: October 26, 1964 (age 61)
- Height: 5 ft 6 in (167 cm)
- Weight: 150 lb (68 kg)

Fencing career
- Sport: Fencing
- Weapon: Sabre

Percival Allan Alger (born October 26, 1964) is a Filipino fencer. He competed in the individual sabre event at the 1988 Summer Olympics.
