= Jerry Dino =

Filipino judoka

Personal information
- Nationality: Filipino
- Born: September 20, 1964
- Died: September 7, 2001 (aged 36) Manila, Philippines
- Height: 5 ft 2 in (157 cm)
- Weight: 128 lb (58 kg)

Sport
- Sport: Judo
- Weight class: -60 kg

Jerry Dino (September 20, 1964 – September 7, 2001) was a Filipino judoka. He competed at the 1988 Summer Olympics and the 1992 Summer Olympics. He competed in the men's -60 kg category.

Dino also competed at the Southeast Asian Games, first participating in the 1985 edition in Bangkok. After his stint in the 1992 Summer Olympics in Barcelona, the Baguio native went on to serve as coach of the Philippine judo team. He also established a T-shirt printing business in Baguio.

He died in a hospital after experiencing cardiac arrest on September 7, 2001, after making a visit to Southeast Asian Games-bound athletes at the Rizal Memorial Sports Complex.
