= Lely Sampurno =

Indonesian sports shooter (born 1935)

Personal information
- Nationality: Indonesian
- Born: 2 December 1935 (age 90)

Sport
- Sport: Sports shooting
Medal record
Women's shooting
Representing Indonesia
Asian Games
Silver medal – second place	1962 Jakarta	50 m pistol
GANEFO
Silver medal – second place	1963 Jakarta	50 m pistol

Lely Sampurno (born 2 December 1935) is an Indonesian sports shooter. She competed in the women's 25 metre pistol event at the 1984 Summer Olympics.
