= Hector Begeo =

Filipino athletics competitor

Medal record

Men's athletics

Representing Philippines

Asian Championships
| Silver medal – second place | 1983 Kuwait City | 3000 m st. |

Hector Begeo (born June 19, 1964) is a three-time Olympian representing the Philippines. He is the national record holder in the men's 3000 metres steeplechase. He also placed second in the 1983 Asian Athletics Championships and third in the steeplechase at the 1982 Asian Games. He is the only Filipino to advance to the semi-finals in the 3000 m Steeplechase in an Olympic event during the 1988 Seoul Olympics. He also represented the Philippines at the 1997 World Championships in Athletics.
