= Bernardo Rimarim =

Filipino, former cyclist

Personal information
- Born: March 23, 1962 (age 64)
- Height: 160 cm (5 ft 3 in)
- Weight: 67 kg (148 lb)

Cycling career
- Sport: Cycling

Bernardo Rimarim (born March 23, 1962) is a Filipino former cyclist. He competed in two events at the 1988 Summer Olympics.
