= Agrippina de la Cruz =

Filipino hurdler

Personal information
- Nationality: Filipino
- Born: November 9, 1960 (age 65) Aguilar, Pangasinan, Philippines
- Height: 5 ft 5 in (164 cm)
- Weight: 110 lb (50 kg)

Sport
- Sport: Track and field
- Event: 100 metres hurdles

Agrippina de la Cruz (born November 9, 1960) is a Filipino hurdler. She competed in the women's 100 metres hurdles at the 1988 Summer Olympics.
