= Hadi Wihardja =

Indonesian weightlifter

Personal information
- Nationality: Indonesian
- Born: 24 January 1962 (age 63)

Sport
- Sport: Weightlifting

Hadi Wihardja (born 24 January 1962) is an Indonesian former weightlifter. He competed in the men's bantamweight event at the 1984 Summer Olympics.
