= Gregorio Colonia =

Filipino weightlifter

Personal information
- Born: May 9, 1963 (age 63)
- Height: 152 cm (5 ft 0 in)
- Weight: 52 kg (115 lb)

Sport
- Sport: Weightlifting

Gregorio Colonia (born May 9, 1963) is a retired flyweight weightlifter from the Philippines who competed at the 1988 Summer Olympics. After retiring from competitions he worked as a weightlifting coach. His trainees include his nephew Nestor Colonia.
