= Samuel Alegada =

Filipino weightlifter (born 1962)

Personal information
- Nationality: Filipino
- Born: 4 August 1962 (age 63)

Sport
- Sport: Weightlifting

Samuel Alegada (born 4 August 1962) is a Filipino weightlifter. He competed in the men's bantamweight event at the 1988 Summer Olympics. Alegada later became a coach for the weightlifting national team of the Philippines.

He was also the holder of men's 56kg Philippine national record which he set by lifting 115 kilograms at the 1991 Southeast Asian Games in Manila, until it was broken by Nestor Colonia's 116 kilogram-lift at the 2011 Philippine National Games in Bacolod.
