= 1987 SEA Games =

Multi-sport event in Jakarta, Indonesia

14th Southeast Asian Games
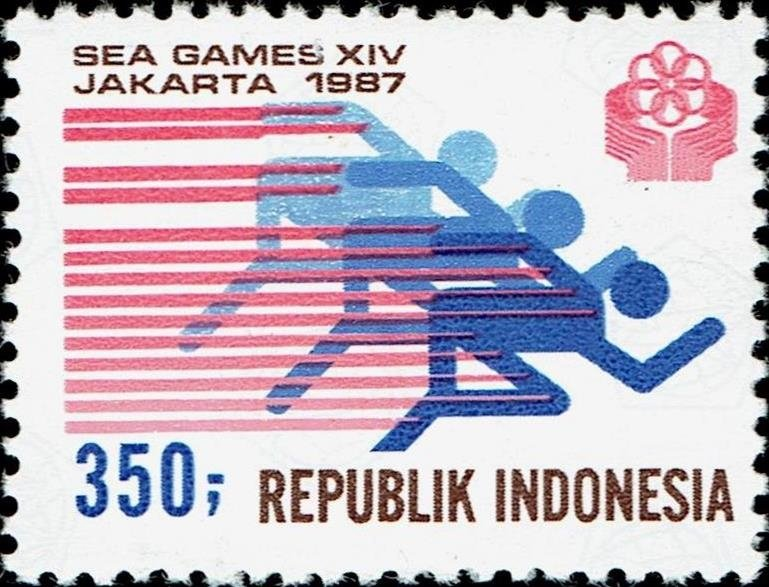
- An Indonesian 1987 stamp, featuring the 1987 Southeast Asian Games logo
- Host city: Jakarta, Indonesia
- Nations: 8
- Sport: 30
- Opening: 9 September 1987
- Closing: 20 September 1987
- Opened by: Suharto; President of Indonesia
- Athlete's Oath: Yuliana Effendi
- Torch lighter: Julius Uwe
- Ceremony venue: Gelora Senayan Stadium

The 1987 Southeast Asian Games (Indonesian: Pesta Olahraga Asia Tenggara 1987), officially known as the 14th Southeast Asian Games, were a multi-sport event held in Jakarta, Indonesia from 9 to 20 September 1987 with 30 sports featured in the games.

This was Indonesia's second time to host the SEA Games, the first being in 1979. The games was opened and closed by President Suharto at the Gelora Senayan Stadium. The final medal tally was led by host Indonesia, followed by Thailand and the Philippines.

== The games ==
=== Participating nations ===
- Brunei
- Burma
- Cambodia
- Indonesia (Host)
- Malaysia
- Philippines
- Singapore
- Thailand

=== Sports ===
- Aquatics
- Archery
- Athletics
- Badminton
- Basketball
- Billiards and snooker
- Bodybuilding
- Bowling
- Boxing
- Canoeing
- Cycling
- Fencing
- Field hockey
- Football
- Golf
- Gymnastics
- Judo
- Karate
- Pencak silat
- Sailing
- Sepak takraw
- Shooting
- Softball
- Table tennis
- Taekwondo
- Tennis
- Volleyball
- Waterskiing
- Weightlifting
- Wrestling

== Venues ==
Jakarta hosted most of the sports of the Games, with outlying venues in West Java and Bali.

Province	Venue	Sports
Jakarta	Senayan Stadium	Ceremonies, Football
Jakarta	Cibubur Stadium	Field hockey
Jakarta	Gajah Mada Plaza	Billiards and snooker
Jakarta	Grogol Youth Center	Taekwondo
Jakarta	Istora Senayan	Boxing
Jakarta	Jakarta–Tangerang Toll Road	Cycling (road)
Jakarta	Jaya Ancol Bowl	Bowling
Jakarta	Jakarta Bay	Sailing
Jakarta	Kuningan Sport Hall	Badminton
Jakarta	Rawamangun Golf Course	Golf
Jakarta	Rawamangun Velodrome	Cycling (track)
Jakarta	Senayan Basketball Hall	Basketball
Jakarta	Senayan Convention Hall	Bodybuilding, Weightlifting
Jakarta	Senayan Shooting Range	Shooting
Jakarta	Senayan Hall B	Judo
Jakarta	Senayan Madya Stadium	Athletics
Jakarta	Senayan Softball Stadium	Softball
Jakarta	Senayan Swimming Pool	Swimming, Diving, Water polo
Jakarta	Senen Youth Center	Table tennis
Jakarta	Trisakti University	Sepak takraw
West Java	Jatiluhur Dam	Canoeing
Bali	Bedugul Lake	Water skiing

=== Medal table ===
A total of 1142 medals, comprising 373 Gold medals, 371 Silver medals and 398 Bronze medals were awarded to athletes. The host Indonesia's performance was their best ever yet and emerged as overall champion of the games.

Key

* Host nation (Indonesia)

Rank	Nation	Gold	Silver	Bronze	Total
1	Indonesia (INA)*	183	136	84	403
2	Thailand (THA)	63	57	67	187
3	Philippines (PHI)	59	78	69	206
4	Malaysia (MAS)	35	41	67	143
5	Singapore (SIN)	19	38	64	121
6	Burma (BIR)	13	15	21	49
7	Brunei (BRU)	1	5	17	23
8	Cambodia (CAM)	0	1	9	10
Totals (8 entries)		373	371	398	1,142

== Broadcasting ==
In Indonesia, TVRI is known to be the broadcaster of the games, especially at football final.

Preceded by Bangkok	Southeast Asian Games; Jakarta; XIV Southeast Asian Games (1987)	Succeeded by Kuala Lumpur
