= Singapore at the 1986 Asian Games =

- IOC code: SIN
- NOC: Singapore National Olympic Council
- Website: www.singaporeolympics.com (in English)

in Seoul, South Korea
- Competitors: 53
- Flag bearer: Ang Peng Siong
- Medals Ranked 18th: Gold 0 Silver 1 Bronze 4 Total 5

Asian Games appearances (overview)
- 1951; 1954; 1958; 1962; 1966; 1970; 1974; 1978; 1982; 1986; 1990; 1994; 1998; 2002; 2006; 2010; 2014; 2018; 2022; 2026

Singapore competed in the 1986 Asian Games in Seoul, South Korea from 20 September to 5 October 1986. Singapore finished the Games with a total of 5 medals, placing eighteenth in the medal table.

== Medal summary ==
=== Medals by sport ===
| Sport | Gold | Silver | Bronze | Total | Rank |
|---|---|---|---|---|---|
| Bowling | 0 | 1 | 0 | 1 | 7 |
| Swimming | 0 | 0 | 3 | 3 | 6 |
| Water polo | 0 | 0 | 1 | 1 | 3 |
| Total | 0 | 1 | 4 | 5 | 18 |

=== Medalists ===
| Medal | Name | Sport | Event |
|---|---|---|---|
| Silver | Mike Wee; Jansen Chan; Ronnie Ng | Bowling | Men's trios |
| Bronze | Ang Peng Siong | Swimming | Men's 100 m freestyle |
| Bronze | Ang Peng Siong; David Lim; Oon Jin Gee; Tay Khoon Hean | Swimming | Men's 4 × 100 m freestyle relay |
| Bronze | David Lim; Oon Jin Gee; Oon Jin Teik; Tay Khoon Hean | Swimming | Men's 4 × 200 m freestyle relay |
| Bronze | Ang Ban Leong; Ang Kiat Wee; Choo Chin Cheng; Edison Foo; Alan Heng; Tony Koh; Leong Hoe Yin; Lim Teck Yin; Tan Hong Boon; Tay Thiam Hua; Teo Keng Soon; Teo Yong Khoon; Daniel Wee | Water polo | Men's team |
