= Singapore at the 1984 Summer Olympics =

- IOC code: SIN
- NOC: Singapore National Olympic Council

in Los Angeles
- Competitors: 5 (5 men and 0 women) in 2 sports
- Flag bearer: Ang Peng Siong
- Medals: Gold 0 Silver 0 Bronze 0 Total 0

Summer Olympics appearances (overview)
- 1948; 1952; 1956; 1960; 1964; 1968; 1972; 1976; 1980; 1984; 1988; 1992; 1996; 2000; 2004; 2008; 2012; 2016; 2020; 2024

Singapore competed at the 1984 Summer Olympics in Los Angeles, United States. The nation returned to the Olympic Games after participating in the American-led boycott of the 1980 Summer Olympics.

== Results and competitors by event ==
=== Swimming at the 1984 Summer Olympics ===
Men's 100m Freestyle

- Ang Peng Siong

- Heat — 51.66
- B-Final — 51.09 (→ 9th place)

- Oon Jin-Gee

- Heat — 54.17 (→ did not advance, 42nd place)

Men's 100m Backstroke

- David Lim Fong Jock

- Heat — 1:00.65 (→ did not advance, 29th place)

Men's 100m Breaststroke

- Oon Jin Teik

- Heat — 1:09.23 (→ did not advance, 42nd place)

Men's 100m Butterfly

- Ang Peng Siong

- Heat — 56.61 (→ did not advance, 27th place)

Men's 4 × 100 m Freestyle Relay

- Ang Peng Siong, Oon Jin Teik, David Lim Fong Jock, Oon Jin-Gee

- Heat — 3:34.63 (→ did not advance, 17th place)

Men's 4 × 100 m Medley Relay

- David Lim Fong Jock, Oon Jin Teik, Ang Peng Siong, and Oon Jin-Gee

- Heat — 4:00.07 (→ did not advance, 16th place)
