= Singapore at the 1988 Summer Olympics =

- IOC code: SIN
- NOC: Singapore National Olympic Council

in Seoul
- Competitors: 8 in 3 sports
- Flag bearer: Ang Peng Siong
- Medals: Gold 0 Silver 0 Bronze 0 Total 0

Summer Olympics appearances (overview)
- 1948; 1952; 1956; 1960; 1964; 1968; 1972; 1976; 1980; 1984; 1988; 1992; 1996; 2000; 2004; 2008; 2012; 2016; 2020; 2024

Singapore competed at the 1988 Summer Olympics in Seoul, South Korea.

== Competitors ==
The following is the list of number of competitors in the Games.

Sport	Men	Women	Total
Sailing	2	0	2
Shooting	0	1	1
Swimming	5	0	5
Total	7	1	8

== Results by event ==
=== Shooting ===
- Khatijah Surattee

=== Swimming ===
Men's 50m Freestyle

- Ang Peng Siong

- Heat — 23.08
- B-Final — 23.39 (→ 11th place)

- Oon Jin Gee

- Heat — 24.86 (→ did not advance, 45th place)

Men's 100m Freestyle

- Ang Peng Siong

- Heat — 52.53 (→ did not advance, 40th place)

- Oon Jin Gee

- Heat — 53.26 (→ did not advance, 43rd place)

Men's 200m Freestyle

- David Lim

- Heat — 1:56.44(→ did not advance, 43rd place)

- Oon Jin Gee

- Heat — 1:57.28 (→ did not advance, 46th place)

Men's 400m Freestyle

- Desmond Koh

- Heat — 4:15.54 (→ did not advance, 44th place)

Men's 100m Backstroke

- David Lim

- Heat — 57.34
- B-Final — 57.72 (→ did not advance, 14th place)

Men's 200m Backstroke

- David Lim

- Heat — 2:08.65 (→ did not advance, 31st place)

Men's 100m Breaststroke

- Ng Yue Meng

- Heat — 1:05.87 (→ did not advance, 41st place)

Men's 200m Breaststroke

- Ng Yue Meng

- Heat — 2:30.74 (→ did not advance, 47th place)

Men's 100m Butterfly

- Ang Peng Siong

- Heat — 57.41 (→ did not advance, 35th place)

Men's 200m Butterfly

- Desmond Koh

- Heat — 2:10.86 (→ did not advance, 37th place)

Men's 200m Individual Medley

- David Lim

- Heat — 2:11.57 (→ did not advance, 34th place)

- Desmond Koh

- Heat — 2:14.77 (→ did not advance, 41st place)

Men's 4 × 100 m Freestyle Relay

- Ang Peng Siong, David Lim, Oon Jin Gee, and Desmond Koh

- Heat — 3:34.54 (→ did not advance, 15th place)

Men's 4 × 100 m Medley Relay

- David Lim, Ng Yue Meng, Ang Peng Siong, and Oon Jin Gee

- Heat — 3:52.86 (→ did not advance, 17th place)

=== Sailing ===
- Chan Joseph
- Siew Shaw Her
