= Aquatics at the 1987 SEA Games =

Aquatics at the 1987 Southeast Asian Games included swimming, diving and water polo events. The three sports of aquatics were held at Senayan Swimming Stadium, Jakarta, Indonesia. Aquatics events was held between 10 September to 16 September.

== Medal winners ==
=== Swimming ===
Men's events

Event	Gold		Silver		Bronze	
100 m freestyle	(Singapore) Ang Peng Siong	52.34	(Singapore) Oon Jin Gee	53.13	(Philippines) Eric Buhain	54.25
200 m freestyle	(Philippines) Eric Buhain	1:56.84	(Singapore) Oon Jin Gee	1:57.01	(Indonesia) Daniel Arief Budiman	1:58.07
400 m freestyle	(Malaysia) Jeffrey Ong	4:05.21	(Philippines) Rene Concepcion	4:10.18	(Indonesia) Daniel Arief Budiman	4:11.10
1500 m freestyle	(Malaysia) Jeffrey Ong	16:14.08	(Malaysia) Huang Ying Tsang	16:51.65	(Philippines) Martin Palacios	17:02.59
100 m backstroke	(Singapore) David Lim	58.62	(Indonesia) Lukman Niode	59.45	(Philippines) Eric Buhain	1:03.23
200 m backstroke	(Singapore) David Lim	2:06.90	(Indonesia) Lukman Niode	2:10.30	(Singapore) Alvin Lim	2:10.34
100 m breaststroke	(Indonesia) Wirmandi Sugriat	1:06.25	(Singapore) Ng Yue Meng	1:06.83	(Philippines) Lee Patrick Concepcion	1:06.91
200 m breaststroke	(Indonesia) Wirmandi Sugriat	2:23.66	(Indonesia) Tjatur Sugiarto	2:25.70	(Philippines) Lee Patrick Concepcion	2:26.03
100 m butterfly	(Philippines) Eric Buhain	56.24	(Singapore) Ang Peng Siong	56.79	(Indonesia) Mustamsikin	57.76
200 m butterfly	(Philippines) Eric Buhain	2:05.34	(Indonesia) Willton Leo	2:11.18	(Philippines) Allen Reyes	2:11.73
200 m individual medley	(Philippines) Rene Concepcion	2:09.86	(Singapore) David Lim	2:10.03	(Singapore) Alvin Lim	2:15.83
400 m individual medley	(Philippines) Eric Buhain	4:39.03	(Philippines) Rene Concepcion	4:46.95	(Singapore) Desmond Koh	4:51.30
4 × 100 m freestyle relay	Singapore	3:33.36	Indonesia	3:38.42	Philippines	3:38.65
4 × 200 m freestyle relay	Singapore	7:53.73	Indonesia	7:56.86	Philippines	8:03.64
4 × 100 m medley relay	Singapore	3:54.27	Indonesia	3:56.92	Philippines	4:04.52

Women's events

Event	Gold		Silver		Bronze	
100 m freestyle	(Malaysia) Nurul Huda Abdullah	59.32	(Indonesia) Elfira Rosa Nasution	1:00.44	(Indonesia) Yen Yen Gunawan	1:01.43
200 m freestyle	(Malaysia) Nurul Huda Abdullah	2:05.95	(Indonesia) Elfira Rosa Nasution	2:08.16	(Malaysia) May Tan Seok Khoon	2:11.72
400 m freestyle	(Malaysia) Nurul Huda Abdullah	4:23.88	(Indonesia) Elfira Rosa Nasution	4:34.90		
800 m freestyle	(Malaysia) Nurul Huda Abdullah	9:12.38	(Thailand) Chatkaew Bulsuk	9:16.36	(Thailand) Kusumarn Thammongkol	9:29.49
100 m backstroke	(Philippines) Akiko Thomson	1:06.86	(Indonesia) Ratna Laurentia Pradipta	1:07.73	(Indonesia) Maya Masita Nasution	1:10.46
200 m backstroke	(Indonesia) Ratna Laurentia Pradipta	2:23.80	(Philippines) Akiko Thomson	2:28.35	(Thailand) Papanee Jirathornwatana	2:33.49
100 m breaststroke	(Thailand) Sornsawan Phuvichit	1:16.35	(Indonesia) Rainy Maria Awuy	1:16.99	(Thailand) Maturada Kunapakorn	1:17.04
200 m breaststroke	(Thailand) Sornsawan Phuvichit	2:43.77	(Indonesia) Rainy Maria Awuy	2:45.44	(Thailand) Maturada Kunapakorn	2:46.99
100 m butterfly	(Malaysia) Nurul Huda Abdullah	1:04.16	(Malaysia) May Tan Seok Khoon	1:05.14	(Indonesia) Elfira Rosa Nasution	1:05.80
200 m butterfly	(Malaysia) Nurul Huda Abdullah	2:18.74	(Indonesia) Elfira Rosa Nasution	2:21.75	(Malaysia) May Tan Seok Khoon	2:24.73
200 m individual medley	(Indonesia) Elfira Rosa Nasution	2:23.85	(Malaysia) Nurul Huda Abdullah	2:24.55	(Thailand) Papanee Jirathornwatana	2:29.32
400 m individual medley	(Malaysia) Nurul Huda Abdullah	5:02.41	(Indonesia) Elfira Rosa Nasution	5:03.71	(Indonesia) Maya Masita Nasution	5:14.61
4 × 100 m freestyle relay	Indonesia	4:03.05	Thailand	4:05.45	Philippines	4:11.75
4 × 100 m medley relay	Indonesia	4:32.81	Thailand	4:37.49	Philippines	4:41.40

=== Diving ===
Event	Gold		Silver		Bronze	
Men's 3 m springboard	(Indonesia) Eko Setiawan	552.42	(Indonesia) P. Diamadi	481.12	(Thailand) Somchai Ongkosak	409.92
Men's 10 m platform	(Indonesia) Eko Setiawan	174.96	(Thailand) Ongkosak Somchai	171.57	(Indonesia) Doddy Wihandjito	161.32
Women's 3 m springboard	(Indonesia) Dwi Mariastuti	442.23	(Indonesia) Sri Retno	382.80	(Myanmar) Aye Aye Soe	381.99
Women's 10 m platform	(Indonesia) Dwi Mariastuti	164.94	(Indonesia) Indah Widyaningsih	152.07	(Myanmar) Aye Aye Soe	151.50

=== Water polo ===
Event	Gold	Silver	Bronze
Men's	Singapore	Indonesia	Malaysia

== Medal table ==
Rank	Nation	Gold	Silver	Bronze	Total
1	Indonesia (INA)	10	19	8	37
2	Malaysia (MAS)	9	3	3	15
3	Singapore (SIN)	7	5	3	15
4	Philippines (PHI)	6	3	11	20
5	Thailand (THA)	2	4	6	12
6	Burma (BIR)	0	0	2	2
Totals (6 entries)		34	34	33	101
