= David Lim =

David Lim may refer to:

- David Lim (mountaineer), Singaporean mountaineer and motivational speaker
- David Lim (swimmer) (born 1966), former Singapore national swimmer and current national coach
- David Lim (water polo) (born 1938), Singaporean Olympic water polo player
- David Lim Kim San (born 1933), Singaporean music educator, administrator and conductor
- David Lim (actor) (born 1983), American actor and model
