= Aquatics at the 1985 SEA Games =

Aquatics at the 1985 Southeast Asian Games included swimming, diving and water polo events. The three sports of aquatics were held at Aquatic Centre in Sport Authority of Thailand Sport Complex, Bangkok, Thailand. Aquatics events was held between 9 December to 12 December.

== Medal winners ==
=== Swimming ===
Men's events

Event	Gold		Silver		Bronze	
100 m freestyle	(Singapore) Ang Peng Siong	52.42	(Singapore) Oon Jin Gee	53.44	(Thailand) Padhanaseth Changkasiri	54.04
200 m freestyle	(Philippines) William Wilson	1:57.25	(Singapore) Oon Jin Gee	1:57.63	(Indonesia) Daniel Arief Budiman	1:57.72
400 m freestyle	(Philippines) William Wilson	4:08.81	(Philippines) René Concepcion	4:13.64	(Indonesia) Daniel Arief Budiman	4:13.84
1500 m freestyle	(Philippines) William Wilson	16:42.19	(Philippines) Enrico Rosquillo	17:08.45	(Malaysia) Huang Ying Tsang	17:19.20
100 m backstroke	(Singapore) David Lim Fong Jock	58.36	(Indonesia) Lukman Niode	58.89	(Thailand) Padhanaseth Changkasiri	1:01.42
200 m backstroke	(Singapore) David Lim Fong Jock	2:08.86	(Indonesia) Lukman Niode	2:09.06	(Philippines) Eric Buhain	2:13.56
100 m breaststroke	(Indonesia) Tjatur Sugiarto	1:06.59	(Philippines) René Concepcion	1:06.83	(Philippines) Jairulla Jaitulla	1:06.84
200 m breaststroke	(Philippines) Lee Concepcion	2:24.56	(Philippines) Francisco Guanco	2:25.81	(Indonesia) Tjatur Sugiarto	2:26.40
100 m butterfly	(Indonesia) Mustamsikin	57.68	(Indonesia) Sudiono Sabeni	57.77	(Singapore) Ang Peng Siong	57.79
200 m butterfly	(Indonesia) Daniel Arief Budiman	2:09.29	(Indonesia) Mustamsikin	2:10.51	(Philippines) Renato Padronia	2:10.85
200 m individual medley	(Singapore) David Lim Fong Jock	2:10.57	(Philippines) Jairulla Jaitulla	2:12.11	(Indonesia) Lukman Niode	2:12.35
400 m individual medley	(Philippines) Eric Buhain	4:43.63	(Philippines) René Concepcion	4:44.19	(Singapore) Soo-tho Kok Mun	4:50.35
4×100 m freestyle relay	Singapore Ang Peng Siong; Tay Khoon Hean; David Lim Fong Jock; Oon Jin Teik	3:34.60	Indonesia Lukman Niode; John David Item; Daniel Arief Budiman; Mustamskin	3:38.82	Philippines René Concepcion; William Wilson; Enrico Rosquillo; Jairulla Jaitulla	3:40.36
4×200 m freestyle relay	Singapore David Lim Fong Jock; Ang Peng Siong; Oon Jin Gee; Oon Jin Teik	7:58.03	Philippines René Concepcion; William Wilson; Enrico Rosquillo; Lee Concepcion	7:58.44	Indonesia Lukman Niode; Daniel Arief Budiman; Mustamsikin; Moh Iqbal Tawaqqal	8:13.44
4×100 m medley relay	Singapore David Lim Fong Jock; Oon Jin Teik; Ang Peng Siong; Oon Jin Gee	3:56.96	Indonesia Tjatur Sugiarto; Lukman Niode; John David Item; Mustamsikin	3:58.17	Philippines William Wilson; Renato Padronia; Eric Buhain; Lee Concepcion	4:02.82

Women's events

Event	Gold		Silver		Bronze	
100 m freestyle	(Malaysia) Nurul Huda Abdullah	59.51	(Malaysia) May Tan Seok Khoon	1:00.83	(Indonesia) Elfira Rosa Nasution	1:00.95
200 m freestyle	(Malaysia) Nurul Huda Abdullah	2:07.77	(Thailand) Chatkaew Bulsuk	2:10.13	(Malaysia) May Tan Seok Khoon	2:10.45
400 m freestyle	(Malaysia) Nurul Huda Abdullah	4:25.39	(Thailand) Kusumarn Thammongkol	4:30.33	(Indonesia) Elfira Rosa Nasution	4:30.35
800 m freestyle	(Malaysia) Nurul Huda Abdullah	8:58.29	(Thailand) Kusumarn Thammongkol	9:15.73	(Thailand) Chatkaew Bulsuk	9:17.87
100 m backstroke	(Indonesia) Ratna Laurentia Pradipta	1:07.93	(Philippines) Christine Jacob	1:10.12	(Philippines) Rizza Maniego	1:11.36
200 m backstroke	(Indonesia) Ratna Laurentia Pradipta	2:26.26	(Philippines) Christine Jacob	2:30.94	(Thailand) Dullaya Phuangthong	2:33.50
100 m breaststroke	(Thailand) Nuntana Khaoplum	1:16.39	(Indonesia) Rainy Maria Awuy	1:16.82	(Philippines) Rose Luzelle Papa	1:20.24
200 m breaststroke	(Thailand) Nuntana Khaoplum	2:44.86	(Indonesia) Rainy Maria Awuy	2:46.37	(Thailand) Kanogwon Sriprasert	2:53.73
100 m butterfly	(Malaysia) May Tan Seok Khoon	1:04.97	(Malaysia) Nurul Huda Abdullah	1:06.07	(Indonesia) Elfira Rosa Nasution	1:06.94
200 m butterfly	(Malaysia) Nurul Huda Abdullah	2:22.54	(Malaysia) May Tan Seok Khoon	2:34.24	(Thailand) Chutiporn Prypiroonroj	2:34.24
200 m individual medley	(Malaysia) Nurul Huda Abdullah	2:24.61	(Indonesia) Elfira Rosa Nasution	2:27.09	(Thailand) Kanongwon Sriprasert	2:32.45
400 m individual medley	(Malaysia) Nurul Huda Abdullah	5:01.19	(Indonesia) Elfira Rosa Nasution	5:09.62	(Indonesia) Maya Masita Nasution	5:19.25
4×100 m freestyle relay	Thailand Chatkaew Bulsuk; Papanee Jirathornwattana; Kusumarn Thammamongkol; Panachit Dhanasin	4:06.70	Philippines Christine Jacob; Ma Christina Bautista; Rose Luzelle Papa; Celestial De Leon	4:07.00	Malaysia May Tan Seok Khoon; Jutta Mee Poh Tan; Marjorie Tan Suan Su; Nurul Huda Abdullah	4:10.55
4×100 m medley relay	Indonesia Laurentia Ratna Pardipta; Rainy Maria Awuy; Elfira Rosa Nasution; Yustina Atmadja	4:32.64	Thailand Dullaya Phuangthong; Nuntana Khaoplum; Kanogwong Sriprasert; Papanee Jirathornwattana	4:38.70	Philippines Christine Jacob; Rose Luzalle Papa; Mari Kaar Maniego; Ma Christina Bautista	4:44.46

=== Diving ===
Event	Gold		Silver		Bronze	
Men's springboard	(Thailand) Somchai Ongkasing	556.41	(Indonesia) Kristedy Permana	548.73	(Indonesia) Djawahir Moc Taufan	547.17
Men's platform	(Thailand) Somchai Ongkasing	527.13	(Indonesia) Eko Setiawan Leoloes	511.26	(Indonesia) Dody Wihaardjito	460.62
Women's springboard	(Indonesia) Dwi Mariastuti	434.94	(Myanmar) Aye Aye Soe	386.76	(Singapore) Lee Po Ling	363.63
Women's platform	(Indonesia) Indah Windyaningsih	351.99	(Indonesia) Dwi Mariastuti	346.41	(Myanmar) Aye Thuzar	320.52

=== Water polo ===
Event	Gold	Silver	Bronze
Men's team	Singapore	Malaysia	Indonesia
