= List of multiple SEA Games medalists =

This article provides a list of multiple Southeast Asian Games medalists, i.e. those athletes who have won multiple Southeast Asian Games medals, including the preceding Southeast Asian Peninsular Games.

As of 2019, Singaporean swimmer Joscelin Yeo has won the most Southeast Asian Games medals with 55 (40 gold, 12 silver, 3 bronze). She managed this feat during the 2005 Games, where her last medal overtook the previous record holder of 39 gold medals by another Singaporean swimmer, Patricia Chan.

== List of most Southeast Asian Games medals over career ==
This is a list of multiple Southeast Asian Games medalists, listing people who have won five or more Southeast Asian Games medals. The years listed for each athlete only include the Games in which they won medals. More detailed information is provided in the linked articles for the individual athletes.

In those instances where more than one athlete has the same number of total medals, the first tiebreaker is the number of gold medals, then the number of silver medals. Where two or more athletes have exactly the same number of gold, silver and bronze medals, the ranking is shown as a tie and the athletes are shown in order by career years and name.

No.	Athlete	Nation	Sport	Years	Gender	Gold	Silver	Bronze	Total
	Joscelin Yeo	Singapore	Swimming	1991–2005	F	40	12	3	55
	Patricia Chan	Singapore	Swimming	1965–1973	F	39	0	0	39
	Quah Ting Wen	Singapore	Swimming	2005–present	F	34	21	5	60
	Quah Zheng Wen	Singapore	Swimming	2011–present	M	32	12	5	50
	Joseph Schooling	Singapore	Swimming	2011–2021	M	29	3	2	34
	Tao Li	Singapore	Swimming	2005–2015	F	29	1	3	33
	Nguyễn Thị Ánh Viên	Vietnam	Swimming	2011–2021	F	25	8	2	35
	Donald Pandiangan	Indonesia	Archery	1977–1987	M	23	6	0	29
	Richard Sam Bera	Indonesia	Swimming	1987–2007	M	22	14	9	45
	Nurul Huda Abdullah	Malaysia	Swimming	1983–1989	F	22	4	1	27
	Teerach Phopanich	Thailand	Gymnastics	1981–1991	M	22	0	0	22
	Shalin Zulkifli	Malaysia	Bowling	1993–2019	F	20	8	5	33
	Quah Jing Wen	Singapore	Swimming	2015–present	F	20	1	2	24
	Ang Peng Siong	Singapore	Swimming	1977–1993	M	20	?	?	20
	Pornchai Kaokaew	Thailand	Sepak takraw	2003–2022	M	18	0	0	18
	Leong Mun Yee	Malaysia	Diving	1999–2017	F	17	5	5	27
	Jiawei Li	Singapore	Table tennis	1999–2007	F	14	3	2	19
	Nguyễn Thị Huyền	Vietnam	Athletics	2011–2023	F	13	1	1	15
	Amanda Lim	Singapore	Swimming	2007–present	F	12	5	2	19
	Miguel Molina	Philippines	Swimming	2001–2009	M	11	7	7	25
	Daniel Bego	Malaysia	Swimming	2003–2013	M	11	6	4	21
	Wynne Prakusya	Indonesia	Tennis	1997–2007	F	11	5	1	17
	Rosalind Singha Ang	Malaysia	Badminton	1965–1977	F	10	10	0	20
	Romana Tedjakusuma	Indonesia	Tennis	1993–2007	F	10	5	4	19
	Rubilen Amit	Philippines	Billiards and Snooker	2005–present	F	10	5	1	16
	Sanchai Ratiwatana	Thailand	Tennis	2003–2019	M	10	4	5	19
	Junhong Jing	Singapore	Table tennis	1995–2003	F	10	2	4	16
	Carlos Yulo	Philippines	Gymnastics	2019–present	M	9	9	0	18
	Sonchat Ratiwatana	Thailand	Tennis	2003–2019	M	9	3	7	19
	Efren Reyes	Philippines	Billiards and Snooker	1991–present	M	7	2	11	20
	Suwandi	Indonesia	Tennis	1995–2007	M	5	8	10	23
	Glenn Victor Sutanto	Indonesia	Swimming	2007–present	M	3	10	7	20
	Nguyễn Thị Oanh	Vietnam	Athletics	2013–present	F	12	1	0	13
	Yayuk Basuki	Indonesia	Tennis	1985–2001	F	11	2	1	14
	Triyaningsih	Indonesia	Athletics	2007–2017	F	11	1	1	13
	Gan Ching Hwee	Singapore	Swimming	2019–present	F	11	1	1	13
	Tuck Yim James Wong	Singapore	Athletics	1987–2013	M	10	1	1	12
	Yeoh Ken Nee	Malaysia	Diving	2001–2011	M	10	1	0	11
	Suzanna Anggarkusuma	Indonesia	Tennis	1981–1989	F	8	6	3	17
	I Gede Siman Sudartawa	Indonesia	Swimming	2011–present	M	8	6	3	17
	Christopher Rungkat	Indonesia	Tennis	2007–present	M	7	6	4	17
	Suthasini Sawettabut	Thailand	Table tennis	2015–present	F	7	4	5	16
	Maria Natalia Londa	Indonesia	Athletics	2009–present	F	6	6	4	16
	Cecil Mamiit	Philippines	Tennis	2005–2011	M	6	6	3	15
	Feng Tianwei	Singapore	Table tennis	2009–present	F	8	5	1	14
	Jessy Rompies	Indonesia	Tennis	2009–present	F	2	4	8	14
	Khoo Cai Lin	Malaysia	Swimming	2007–2013	F	5	7	6	18
	Sylvia Ng	Malaysia	Badminton	1969–1977	F	8	4	1	13
	Hoàng Xuân Vinh	Vietnam	Shooting	2007–present	M	8	2	3	13
	Agus Prayogo	Indonesia	Athletics	2009–present	M	7	4	2	13
	Grace Young	Singapore	Bowling	1987–1995	F	7	2	4	13
	Zhang Guirong	Singapore	Athletics	2003–2017	F	6	3	4	13
	Riau Ega Agatha	Indonesia	Archery	2011–present	M	6	3	3	12
	Bonit Wiryawan	Indonesia	Tennis	1995–2005	M	4	4	4	12
	Susanto Megaranto	Indonesia	Chess	2003–present	M	4	4	4	12
	Ryan Arabejo	Philippines	Swimming	2005–2011	M	4	3	5	12
	Treat Huey	Philippines	Tennis	2009–2021	M	3	5	5	13
	Ng Boon Bee	Malaysia	Badminton	1961–1971	M	8	2	1	11
	Eric Cray	Philippines	Athletics	2013–present	M	8	1	2	11
	Liliyana Natsir	Indonesia	Badminton	2003–2011	F	5	3	3	11
	Zulmazran Zulkifli	Malaysia	Bowling	2005–2011	M	5	1	5	11
	Sam Tan	Singapore	Archery	1974–1980; 1983–1985	F	2	7	1	10
	John Baylon	Philippines	Judo	1991–2011	M	9	1	0	10
	Supriyati Sutono	Indonesia	Athletics	1997–2003	F	8	2	0	10
	Võ Văn Bảy	Vietnam	Tennis	1959–1973	M	7	1	2	10
	Cheah Soon Kit	Malaysia	Badminton	1987–1997	M	4	4	2	10
	Shanti Pereira	Singapore	Athletics	2013–present	F	4	1	5	10
	Susi Susanti	Indonesia	Badminton	1987–1985	F	8	1	0	9
	Markis Kido	Indonesia	Badminton	2003–2011	M	7	2	0	9
	Hendra Setiawan	Indonesia	Badminton	2003–2011	M	7	2	0	9
	Lita Liem Sugiarto	Indonesia	Tennis	1977–1981	F	6	2	1	9
	Luksika Kumkhum	Thailand	Tennis	2015–present	F	5	2	2	9
	Kunalan Canagasabai	Singapore	Athletics	1967–1977	M	4	4	1	9
	Chee Swee Lee	Singapore	Athletics	1969–1975	M	2	6	1	9
	Greysia Polii	Indonesia	Badminton	2005–2022	F	2	5	2	9
	Jeffrey Ong	Malaysia	Swimming	1987–1993	M	8	0	0	8
	Icuk Sugiarto	Indonesia	Badminton	1981–1989	M	7	1	0	8
	Eko Yuli Irawan	Indonesia	Weightlifting	2007–present	M	7	1	0	8
	Vita Marissa	Indonesia	Badminton	2001–2011	F	6	2	0	8
	Simon Santoso	Indonesia	Badminton	2003–2011	M	6	2	0	8
	Kim Mangrobang	Philippines	Triathlon	2015–present	F	6	2	0	8
	Atet Wijono	Indonesia	Tennis	1977–1981	M	6	1	1	8
	Willy Wang	Philippines	Wushu	2001–2007	M	6	1	1	8
	Puripol Boonson	Thailand	Athletics	2021–present	M	6	0	0	6
	Nova Widianto	Indonesia	Badminton	2001–2009	M	5	2	1	8
	Benjamin Tolentino Jr.	Philippines	Rowing	2005–2015	M	5	2	1	8
	Noppawan Lertcheewakarn	Thailand	Tennis	2007–2017	F	5	2	1	8
	Donald Wailan-Walalangi	Indonesia	Tennis	1983–1989	M	4	2	2	8
	Suryo Agung Wibowo	Indonesia	Athletics	2003–2009	M	4	1	3	8
	Ayu Fani Damayanti	Indonesia	Tennis	2005–2011	F	2	4	2	8
	Chelsie Monica Ignesias Sihite	Indonesia	Chess	2011–present	F	2	4	2	8
	Võ Văn Thành	Vietnam	Tennis	1959–1973	M	5	2	0	7
	Sony Dwi Kuncoro	Indonesia	Badminton	2003–2009	M	5	2	0	7
	Varatchaya Wongteanchai	Thailand	Tennis	2009–2015	F	5	2	0	7
	Agatha Wong	Philippines	Wushu	2017–present	F	5	2	0	7
	Taufik Hidayat	Indonesia	Badminton	1999–2011	M	5	1	1	7
	Dennis Orcollo	Philippines	Billiards and Snooker	2005–present	M	5	0	2	7
	Zain Amat	Singapore	Shooting	2005–2015	M	5	0	2	7
	Sheila Mae Pérez	Philippines	Diving	2005–2011	F	4	2	1	7
	Lee Wung Yew	Singapore	Shooting	1995–2007	M	4	2	1	7
	Suharyadi	Indonesia	Tennis	1985–1989	M	4	1	2	7
	Dedeh Erawati	Indonesia	Athletics	2005–2015	F	3	4	0	7
	Gondo Widjojo	Indonesia	Tennis	1977–1979	M	6	0	0	6
	Kiefer Ravena	Philippines	Basketball	2011–present	M	5	1	0	6
	Lukky Tedjamukti	Indonesia	Tennis	1985–1991	F	5	0	1	6
	Josie Gabuco	Philippines	Boxing	2009–present	F	5	0	1	6
	Sheik Alauddin	Singapore	Pencak Silat	1987–1999	M	4	2	0	6
	Chezka Centeno	Philippines	Billiards and Snooker	2015–present	F	4	2	0	6
	Marestella Torres-Sunang	Philippines	Athletics	2005–2017	F	4	0	2	6
	Nguyễn Đình Cương	Vietnam	Athletics	2003–2011	M	4	1	1	6
	Jamras Rittidet	Thailand	Athletics	2009–2017	M	4	1	1	6
	Henry Dagmil	Philippines	Athletics	2005–2013	M	3	2	1	6
	Prima Simpatiaji	Indonesia	Tennis	2003–2005	M	1	1	4	6
	John Herman Murray	Indonesia	Athletics	2003–2007	M	0	2	4	6
	Lý Hoàng Nam	Vietnam	Tennis	2017–present	M	2	1	3	6
	Rene Herrera	Philippines	Athletics	2003–2011	M	5	0	0	5
	Candra Wijaya	Indonesia	Badminton	1997–2001	M	4	1	0	5
	Afril Bernardino	Philippines	Basketball	2019–present	F	3	2	0	5
	Lucas Teo Guang Yi	Singapore	Canoeing	2011–present	M	3	1	1	5
	Maria Kristin Yulianti	Indonesia	Badminton	2003–2009	F	2	1	2	5
	Debby Susanto	Indonesia	Badminton	2011–2015	F	2	1	2	5
	Febi Widhiyanto	Indonesia	Tennis	1999–2003	M	1	2	2	5
	Septi Mende	Indonesia	Tennis	2003–2005	F	1	2	2	5
	Lavinia Tananta	Indonesia	Tennis	2009–2015	F	1	2	2	5
	Eumir Marcial	Philippines	Boxing	2015–present	M	4	0	0	4
	Troy Rosario	Philippines	Basketball	2015–present	M	3	1	0	4
	Juvic Pagunsan	Philippines	Golf	2001–2005	M	3	0	1	4
	Charly Suarez	Philippines	Boxing	2009–present	M	3	0	1	4
	Ronato Alcano	Philippines	Billiards and Snooker	2005–2009	M	4	0	0	4
