= Singapore at the 1960 Summer Olympics =

- IOC code: SIN
- NOC: Singapore National Olympic Council

in Rome
- Competitors: 5 in 3 sports
- Medals Ranked 32nd: Gold 0 Silver 1 Bronze 0 Total 1

Summer Olympics appearances (overview)
- 1948; 1952; 1956; 1960; 1964; 1968; 1972; 1976; 1980; 1984; 1988; 1992; 1996; 2000; 2004; 2008; 2012; 2016; 2020; 2024; 2028

Singapore competed at the 1960 Summer Olympics in Rome, Italy. Five competitors, all men, took part in three events in three sports. This marked the first and only time Singapore competed at the Olympics as a self-governing colony of the United Kingdom under what would later become the national flag. Tan Howe Liang won the territory's first ever Olympic medal, its only medal until 2008.

== Medalists ==
=== Silver ===
- Tan Howe Liang – weightlifting, men's lightweight

The following Singaporean athletes participated in the games:

== Sailing ==
- James Cooke
- Durcan Thomas Kevin
- Holiday Edward Gilbert

== Shooting ==
One shooter represented Singapore in 1960.

50 m pistol

- Kok Kum Woh

== Weightlifting ==
- Tan Howe Liang (2nd place)
