= Singapore at the 2020 Summer Olympics =

- IOC code: SGP
- NOC: Singapore National Olympic Council
- Website: www.singaporeolympics.com

in Tokyo, Japan July 23, 2021 – August 8, 2021
- Competitors: 23 in 11 sports
- Flag bearers (opening): Yu Mengyu; Loh Kean Yew
- Flag bearer (closing): Jonathan Chan
- Medals: Gold 0 Silver 0 Bronze 0 Total 0

Summer Olympics appearances (overview)
- 1948; 1952; 1956; 1960; 1964; 1968; 1972; 1976; 1980; 1984; 1988; 1992; 1996; 2000; 2004; 2008; 2012; 2016; 2020; 2024; 2028

Other related appearances
- Malaysia (1964)

Singapore competed at the 2020 Summer Olympics in Tokyo. Originally scheduled to take place from 24 July to 9 August 2020, the Games were postponed to 23 July to 8 August 2021, because of the COVID-19 pandemic. It is the nation's seventeenth appearance at the Summer Olympics since its debut at the 1948 Games. In addition, Singapore was part of the Malaysian team at the 1964 Summer Olympics in Tokyo, but did not attend at the 1980 Summer Olympics in Moscow, because of its support for the United States boycott. The opening ceremony flag-bearers for Singapore are table tennis player Yu Mengyu and shuttler Loh Kean Yew. Diver Jonathan Chan is the flag-bearer for the closing ceremony.

Singapore failed to win any Olympic medals for the first time since the 2008 Summer Olympics, with the last time being at the 2004 edition.

== Competitors ==
The following is the list of number of competitors in the Games.

| Sport | Men | Women | Total |
|---|---|---|---|
| Athletics | 0 | 1 | 1 |
| Badminton | 1 | 1 | 2 |
| Diving | 1 | 1 | 2 |
| Equestrian | 0 | 1 | 1 |
| Fencing | 0 | 2 | 2 |
| Gymnastics | 0 | 1 | 1 |
| Rowing | 0 | 1 | 1 |
| Sailing | 1 | 3 | 4 |
| Shooting | 0 | 1 | 1 |
| Swimming | 2 | 2 | 4 |
| Table tennis | 1 | 3 | 4 |
| Total | 6 | 17 | 23 |

== Athletics ==
Singapore received a universality slot from IAAF to send a female athlete to the Olympics. Veronica Shanti Pereira finished in sixth place in her heat and did not advance to the next round of the competition.

Key

- Note–Ranks given for track events are within the athlete's heat only
- Q = Qualified for the next round
- q = Qualified for the next round as a fastest loser or, in field events, by position without achieving the qualifying target
- NR = National record
- N/A = Round not applicable for the event
- Bye = Athlete not required to compete in round

Track & road events

| Athlete | Event | Heat | | Semifinal | | Final | |
| Athlete | Event | Result | Rank | Result | Rank | Result | Rank |
|---|---|---|---|---|---|---|---|
| Veronica Shanti Pereira | Women's 200 m | 23.96 SB | 6 | Did not advance | | | |

== Badminton ==
Singapore entered two badminton players (one per gender) into the Olympic tournament. Loh Kean Yew and Yeo Jia Min were selected to compete at the Games in the men's and women's singles, respectively, based on the BWF World Race to Tokyo Rankings.

| Athlete | Event | Group stage | | | Elimination | Quarterfinal | Semifinal | Final / BM | |
| Athlete | Event | Opposition Score | Opposition Score | Rank | Opposition Score | Opposition Score | Opposition Score | Opposition Score | Rank |
|---|---|---|---|---|---|---|---|---|---|
| Loh Kean Yew | Men's singles | Mahmoud (EOR); W (21–15, 21–12) | Christie (INA); L (20–22, 21–13, 18–21) | 2 | Did not advance | | | | |
| Yeo Jia Min | Women's singles | Gaitan (MEX); W (21–7, 21–10) | Kim G-e (KOR); L (13–21, 14–21) | 2 | Did not advance | | | | |

== Diving ==
Singapore sent one diver (Jonathan Chan) to the Olympic competition by winning the gold medal in the men's platform at the 2019 Asian Diving Cup in Kuala Lumpur, Malaysia, marking the country's debut in the sport at the Games. Additionally, Freida Lim qualified in the Olympics after finishing fifteenth in the semifinal round of the women's platform in FINA Diving World Cup thereby making the country's first female diver.

| Athlete | Event | Preliminary | | Semifinal | | Final | |
| Athlete | Event | Points | Rank | Points | Rank | Points | Rank |
|---|---|---|---|---|---|---|---|
| Jonathan Chan | Men's 10 m platform | 311.15 | 26 | Did not advance | | | |
| Freida Lim | Women's 10 m platform | 215.90 | 30 | Did not advance | | | |

== Equestrian ==
With New Zealand withdrawing and Malaysia failing to comply with the minimum eligibility requirements, Singapore received an invitation from FEI to send a dressage rider to the Games, as the next highest-ranked eligible nation within the individual FEI Olympic Rankings for Group G (South East Asia, Oceania). This outcome signified the nation's Olympic debut in the equestrian disciplines. Caroline Chew was selected to represent Singapore at the Games.

=== Dressage ===
| Athlete | Horse | Event | Grand Prix | | Grand Prix Freestyle | | Overall | |
| Athlete | Horse | Event | Score | Rank | Technical | Artistic | Score | Rank |
|---|---|---|---|---|---|---|---|---|
| Caroline Chew | Tribiani | Individual | Eliminated | | Did not advance | | | |

Qualification Legend: Q = Qualified for the final; q = Qualified for the final as a lucky loser

== Fencing ==
Singapore entered two fencers into the Olympic competition for the first time since 1992. Kiria Tikanah (women's épée) and American-based Amita Berthier (women's foil) claimed the fencing spots on the Singaporean roster as the sole winners of their respective individual events at the Asia and Oceania Zonal Qualifier in Tashkent, Uzbekistan.

| Athlete | Event | Round of 64 | Round of 32 | Round of 16 | Quarterfinal | Semifinal | Final / BM | |
| Athlete | Event | Opposition Score | Opposition Score | Opposition Score | Opposition Score | Opposition Score | Opposition Score | Rank |
|---|---|---|---|---|---|---|---|---|
| Kiria Tikanah | Women's épée | Lin (HKG); W 15–11 | Popescu (ROU); L 10–15 | Did not advance | | | | |
| Amita Berthier | Women's foil | Bye | Kiefer (USA); L 4–15 | Did not advance | | | | |

== Gymnastics ==
=== Artistic ===
Singapore entered one artistic gymnast into the Olympic competition for the first time since 2012. As one of the twelve highest-ranked gymnasts, Tan Sze En received a spare berth freed up by host nation Japan. Neither Sze En nor her team qualified directly through the all-around competition, at the 2019 World Championships in Stuttgart, Germany.

Women

| Athlete | Event | Qualification | | | | | | Final | | | | | |
| Athlete | Event | Apparatus | | | | Total | Rank | Apparatus | | | | Total | Rank |
| Athlete | Event | V | UB | BB | F | Total | Rank | V | UB | BB | F | Total | Rank |
|---|---|---|---|---|---|---|---|---|---|---|---|---|---|
| Tan Sze En | Balance beam | —N/a | | 11.033 | —N/a | 11.033 | 84 | Did not advance | | | | | |
| Tan Sze En | Floor | —N/a | | | 11.833 | 11.833 | 75 | Did not advance | | | | | |

== Rowing ==
Singapore received an invitation from World Rowing to send a rower competing in the women's single sculls to the Games, as the next highest-ranked nation vying for qualification at the 2021 FISA Asia & Oceania Olympic Qualification Regatta in Tokyo, Japan. Joan Poh was entered to compete in the Games.

| Athlete | Event | Heats | | Repechage | | Quarterfinals | | Semifinals | | Final | |
| Athlete | Event | Time | Rank | Time | Rank | Time | Rank | Time | Rank | Time | Rank |
|---|---|---|---|---|---|---|---|---|---|---|---|
| Joan Poh | Women's single sculls | 8:31.12 | 6 R | 8:40.06 | 4 SE/F | Bye | | 8:47.77 | 3 FE | 8:21.23 | 28 |

Qualification Legend: FA=Final A (medal); FB=Final B (non-medal); FC=Final C (non-medal); FD=Final D (non-medal); FE=Final E (non-medal); FF=Final F (non-medal); SA/B=Semifinals A/B; SC/D=Semifinals C/D; SE/F=Semifinals E/F; QF=Quarterfinals; R=Repechage

== Sailing ==
Singaporean sailors qualified one boat in each of the following classes through the class-associated World Championships and the continental regattas.

| Athlete | Event | Race | | | | | | | | | | | | | Net points | Final rank |
| Athlete | Event | 1 | 2 | 3 | 4 | 5 | 6 | 7 | 8 | 9 | 10 | 11 | 12 | M* | Net points | Final rank |
|---|---|---|---|---|---|---|---|---|---|---|---|---|---|---|---|---|
| Ryan Lo | Men's Laser | 18 | 15 | 6 | 28 | 21 | 24 | 22 | ~~UFD~~ | 22 | 2 | —N/a | | EL | 158 | 21 |
| Amanda Ng | Women's RS:X | 22 | 17 | 20 | 25 | 26 | ~~27~~ | 26 | 26 | 23 | 26 | 24 | 25 | EL | 260 | 26 |
| Kimberly Lim; Cecilia Low | Women's 49er FX | 12 | 12 | 11 | ~~15~~ | 15 | 13 | 3 | 2 | 7 | 8 | 1 | 13 | 20 | 117 | 10 |

M = Medal race; EL = Eliminated – did not advance into the medal race

== Shooting ==
Singaporean shooters achieved quota places for the following events by virtue of their best finishes at the 2018 ISSF World Championships, the 2019 ISSF World Cup series, and Asian Championships, as long as they obtained a minimum qualifying score (MQS) by 31 May 2020.

| Athlete | Event | Qualification | | Final | |
| Athlete | Event | Points | Rank | Points | Rank |
|---|---|---|---|---|---|
| Adele Tan | Women's 10 m air rifle | 625.3 | 21 | Did not advance | |

== Swimming ==
Singaporean swimmers further achieved qualifying standards in the following events (up to a maximum of 2 swimmers in each event at the Olympic Qualifying Time (OQT) and potentially 1 at the Olympic Selection Time (OST)). Another swimmer qualified via universality places:

| Athlete | Event | Heat | | Semifinal | | Final | |
| Athlete | Event | Time | Rank | Time | Rank | Time | Rank |
|---|---|---|---|---|---|---|---|
| Quah Zheng Wen | Men's 100 m backstroke | 53.94 | 22 | Did not advance | | | |
| Quah Zheng Wen | Men's 100 m butterfly | 52.39 | 34 | Did not advance | | | |
| Quah Zheng Wen | Men's 200 m butterfly | 1:56.42 | 22 | Did not advance | | | |
| Joseph Schooling | Men's 100 m freestyle | 49.84 | 39 | Did not advance | | | |
| Joseph Schooling | Men's 100 m butterfly | 53.12 | 44 | Did not advance | | | |
| Chantal Liew | Women's 10 km open water | —N/a | | | | 2:08:17.9 | 23 |
| Quah Ting Wen | Women's 50 m freestyle | 26.16 | 40 | Did not advance | | | |
| Quah Ting Wen | Women's 100 m freestyle | 56.36 | 36 | Did not advance | | | |

== Table tennis ==
Singapore entered four athletes into the table tennis competition at the Games. The women's team secured a berth by advancing to the quarterfinal round of the 2020 World Olympic Qualification Event in Gondomar, Portugal, permitting a maximum of two starters to compete in the women's singles tournament and men's single at 2021 Asian Olympic Qualification Tournament in Doha, Qatar. Meanwhile, Clarence Chew scored a zonal-match triumph for Southeast Asia to book a men's singles spot at the Asian Qualification Tournament in Doha, Qatar.

| Athlete | Event | Preliminary | Round 1 | Round 2 | Round 3 | Round of 16 | Quarterfinals | Semifinals | Final / BM | |
| Athlete | Event | Opposition Result | Opposition Result | Opposition Result | Opposition Result | Opposition Result | Opposition Result | Opposition Result | Opposition Result | Rank |
|---|---|---|---|---|---|---|---|---|---|---|
| Clarence Chew | Men's singles | Bye | Diaw (SEN); W 4–2 | Habesohn (AUT); L 1–4 | Did not advance | | | | | |
| Feng Tianwei | Women's singles | Bye | | | Xiao (ESP); W 4–1 | Han Y (GER); L 1–4 | Did not advance | | | |
| Yu Mengyu | Women's singles | Bye | | Shao (POR); W 4–0 | Cheng I-c (TPE); W 4–0 | Liu (USA); W 4–2 | Ishikawa (JPN); W 4–1 | Chen M (CHN); L 0–4 | Ito (JPN); L 1–4 | 4 |
| Feng Tianwei; Lin Ye; Yu Mengyu | Women's team | Bye | | | | France; W 3–0 | China; L 0–3 | Did not advance | | |

== See also ==
- Singapore at the 2020 Summer Paralympics
