= Singapore at the 1948 Summer Olympics =

- IOC code: SGP (SIN used at these Games)
- NOC: Singapore National Olympic Council

in London
- Competitors: 1 in 1 sport
- Medals: Gold 0 Silver 0 Bronze 0 Total 0

Summer Olympics appearances (overview)
- 1948; 1952; 1956; 1960; 1964; 1968; 1972; 1976; 1980; 1984; 1988; 1992; 1996; 2000; 2004; 2008; 2012; 2016; 2020; 2024; 2028

Other related appearances
- Malaysia (1964)

Singapore competed in the Summer Olympic Games for the first time at the 1948 Summer Olympics in London, England, as a British Crown Colony. The United Kingdom, the host of the 1948 Olympics, needed more participating nations, subsequently sending invitations to every colony except Singapore. This caused Singapore to establish the Singapore National Olympic Council on May 27, 1947. A delegation of only one man, Lloyd Valberg was sent to participate in the Men's high jump. Valberg gained 14th place, tied with Hércules Azcune of Uruguay.

== Background ==
Singapore was crown colony of the United Kingdom. During World War II, the kingdom focused mainly on Europe. This caused the Empire of Japan to invade Singapore from 1942 to 1945. After the war, commonwealth troops returned to Singapore and made the country the headquarters of the British Military Administration of Malaya.

The 1948 Summer Olympics needed more member nations than the 1936 Summer Olympics in Berlin that had only 49 participating nations. Due to numerous conflicts around the globe, including the Cold War, the organizers of the 1948 Olympics decided to mail invitations to numerous countries and colonies. Even though Singapore was a crown colony, it had not been included in the mailing lists and, thus, had not received an invitation. The main newspaper of Singapore, The Straits Times, reported the lack of an invitation on March 20, 1947, through a commentary by its sports editor. It pointed the blame to the colonial government and the sporting community. The Singapore National Olympic Council was inaugurated on May 27 that same year.

A delegation of only one man, fireman Lloyd Valberg, was sent to the 1948 Summer Olympics in London, competing in the high jump. The London Games, held from 29 July to 14 August 1948, hosted 4,104 athletes from 59 countries in 139 events. O. T. Bussek served as the attaché for the delegation and Valberg was housed at the Wembley County School along with the delegations of Bermuda, British Guiana, Ceylon, Jamaica, Malta, and Trinidad.

== Athletes ==
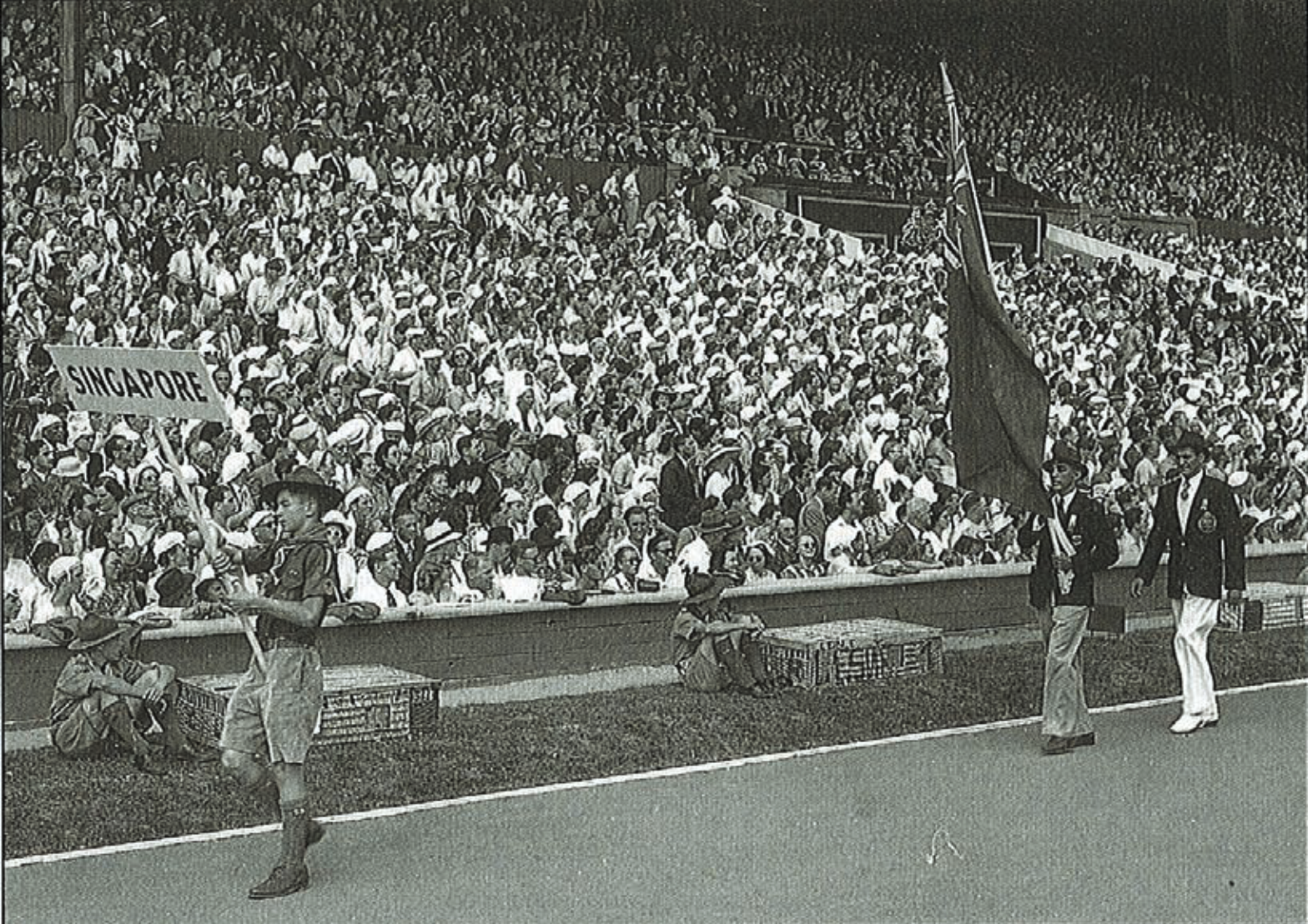
The Singapore delegation at the 1948 Summer Olympics.

Singapore sent its only representative to participate in the high jump competition for men. In the qualifying round held on July 30, Valberg cleared 1.87 metres (6.1 feet), therefore qualifying to the final round. In the final round that same day, Valberg cleared a height of 1.80 m (5.9 ft), getting tied for 14th place with Hércules Azcune of Uruguay.

Key

- Note–Ranks given for track events are within the athlete's heat only
- Q = Qualified for the next round
- q = Qualified for the next round as a fastest loser or, in field events, by position without achieving the qualifying target
- NR = National record
- N/A = Round not applicable for the event
- Bye = Athlete not required to compete in round
- NP = Not placed

Men
Field Events

Athlete	Event	Qualification		Final	
Athlete	Event	Distance	Position	Distance	Position
Lloyd Valberg	High Jump	1.87	Q	1.80	14

== Aftermath ==
After the 1948 Olympics, Singapore went on to participate in every edition of the Olympics except in the 1980 Summer Olympics, where the delegation took part in a boycott. Valberg continued his job as a chief fire officer at the Port of Singapore Authority, gaining the King's Police & Fire Service Medal in 1951 for bravery during a fire. Valberg died in 1997. Valberg's grandnephew, Joseph Schooling, won the Olympic gold medal at the 2016 Summer Olympics in the Men's 100-meter butterfly, stating that he wanted to take part due to his granduncle making "history" as an Olympian.
