= Singapore at the 1952 Summer Olympics =

- IOC code: SGP (SIN used at these Games)
- NOC: Singapore National Olympic Council

in Helsinki
- Competitors: 5 in 3 sports
- Flag bearer: Thong Saw Pak
- Medals: Gold 0 Silver 0 Bronze 0 Total 0

Summer Olympics appearances (overview)
- 1948; 1952; 1956; 1960; 1964; 1968; 1972; 1976; 1980; 1984; 1988; 1992; 1996; 2000; 2004; 2008; 2012; 2016; 2020; 2024

Other related appearances
- Malaysia (1964)

Singapore competed at the 1952 Summer Olympics in Helsinki, Finland.

== Athletes ==
The following Singaporean athletes participated in the games:

=== Athletics ===
- Tang Pui Wah

=== Swimming ===
Men

Ranks given are within the heat.

Athlete	Event	Heat		Semifinal		Final	
Athlete	Event	Time	Rank	Time	Rank	Time	Rank
Neo Chwee Kok	100 m freestyle	1:00.6	3	Did not advance			
Neo Chwee Kok	400 m freestyle	4:57.5	3	Did not advance			

=== Weightlifting ===
- Chay Weng Yew (6th place)
- Lon Bin Mohamed Noor (8th place)
- Thong Saw Pak
