= Singapore at the 1982 Asian Games =

- IOC code: SIN
- NOC: Singapore National Olympic Council
- Website: www.singaporeolympics.com (in English)

in New Delhi
- Competitors: 64
- Flag bearer: Tang Ngai Kin
- Medals Ranked 16th: Gold 1 Silver 0 Bronze 2 Total 3

Asian Games appearances (overview)
- 1951; 1954; 1958; 1962; 1966; 1970; 1974; 1978; 1982; 1986; 1990; 1994; 1998; 2002; 2006; 2010; 2014; 2018; 2022; 2026

Singapore participated in the 1982 Asian Games held in New Delhi, India from 19 November to 4 December 1982. Singapore ranked 16th with 1 gold and 2 bronze medals with a total of 3 over-all medals.

Singapore sent 64 athletes to compete in New Delhi. National water polo team coach, Tan Eng Bock, was assigned as chef de mission for the contingent. On the eve of the games, Tan revealed the target of meeting the same number of medals at the 1978 Asian Games, two golds, one bronze and four silver medals.

== Medalists ==
Medal	Name	Sport	Event	Date
Gold	Ang Peng Siong	Swimming	100 m men's freestyle	
Bronze	Ang Peng Siong	Swimming	100 m men's butterfly	
Bronze	Lai May May; Gillian Chee; Mavis Ee; Chan Mui Pin	Swimming	4 × 100 m women's freestyle relay	

== Field Hockey ==
Team	Event	Group Stage						Semifinal / Pl.	Final / BM / Pl.	
Team	Event	Opposition Score	Opposition Score	Opposition Score	Opposition Score	Opposition Score	Rank	Opposition Score	Opposition Score	Rank
Singapore women's	Women's tournament	South Korea; L 0–5	Malaysia; L 0–1	Japan; L 0–1	Hong Kong; W 4–1	India; L 0–3	5	Did not advance		5

=== Women's tournament ===
Team	Pld	W	D	L	GF	GA	GD	Pts
India	5	5	0	0	37	1	+36	10
South Korea	5	3	1	1	17	8	+9	7
Malaysia	5	3	1	1	7	6	+1	7
Japan	5	2	0	3	15	8	+7	4
Singapore	5	1	0	4	4	11	−7	2
Hong Kong	5	0	0	5	1	47	−46	0

21 November

South Korea	5–0	Singapore

Shivaji Stadium, New Delhi

22 November

Malaysia	1–0	Singapore

Shivaji Stadium, New Delhi

23 November

Japan	1–0	Singapore

Shivaji Stadium, New Delhi

25 November

Singapore	4–1	Hong Kong

Shivaji Stadium, New Delhi

26 November

India	3–0	Singapore

Shivaji Stadium, New Delhi

== Water polo ==
Summary

Key:

- FT – After full time.
- P – Match decided by penalty-shootout.

Team	Event	Group Stage				Semifinal / Pl.	Final / BM / Pl.	
Team	Event	Opposition Score	Opposition Score	Opposition Score	Rank	Opposition Score	Opposition Score	Rank
Singapore men's	Men's tournament	Saudi Arabia; W 27–4	Japan; L 6–15	Bangladesh; W 24–4	2 Q	China; L 5–25	India; L 7–8	4

=== Men's tournament ===
Group B

Pos	Team	Pld	W	D	L	GF	GA	GD	Pts
1	Japan	3	3	0	0	70	7	+63	6
2	Singapore	3	2	0	1	57	23	+34	4
3	Saudi Arabia	3	1	0	2	17	60	−43	2
4	Bangladesh	3	0	0	3	15	69	−54	0

Source: Results

20 November	Singapore	27–4	Saudi Arabia	Talkatora Swimming Pool, New Delhi

21 November	Japan	15–6	Singapore	Talkatora Swimming Pool, New Delhi

23 November	Singapore	24–4	Bangladesh	Talkatora Swimming Pool, New Delhi

Semifinals

24 November	China	25–5	Singapore	Talkatora Swimming Pool, New Delhi

Bronze medal match

28 November	Singapore	7–8	India	Talkatora Swimming Pool, New Delhi
