= Singapore at the 2024 Summer Olympics =

- IOC code: SGP
- NOC: Singapore National Olympic Council
- Website: www.singaporeolympics.com

in Paris, France 26 July 2024 – 11 August 2024
- Competitors: 23 (7 men and 16 women) in 11 sports
- Flag bearers (opening): Ryan Lo & Shanti Pereira
- Flag bearers (closing): Max Maeder & Stephenie Chen
- Medals Ranked 84th: Gold 0 Silver 0 Bronze 1 Total 1

Summer Olympics appearances (overview)
- 1948; 1952; 1956; 1960; 1964; 1968; 1972; 1976; 1980; 1984; 1988; 1992; 1996; 2000; 2004; 2008; 2012; 2016; 2020; 2024; 2028

Other related appearances
- Malaysia (1964)

Singapore competed at the 2024 Summer Olympics in Paris from 26 July to 11 August 2024. It was the nation's eighteenth appearance at the Summer Olympics since its debut at the 1948 Games. Singapore has competed in every edition since except 1964 in Tokyo, as part of the Malaysian team, and 1980 in Moscow, because of its support for the United States boycott.

== Medalists ==
The following Singaporean competitors won medals at the Games. In the by discipline sections below, medalists' names are bolded.

Name	Sport	Event	Medal	Date
Max Maeder	Sailing	Men's Formula Kite	Bronze	9 August

== Competitors ==
On 16 April, former Olympian and sailor Tan Wearn Haw was selected as the Chef De Mission of the Singapore delegation in Paris. In all, 23 athletes will be representing Singapore at the Games with Shanti Pereira and Ryan Lo selected as the flag bearers.

=== Entry by Sport ===
The following is the number of competitors in the Games.

Sport	Men	Women	Total
Athletics	1	1	2
Badminton	2	2	4
Canoeing	0	1	1
Equestrian	0	1	1
Fencing	0	2	2
Golf	0	1	1
Rowing	0	1	1
Sailing	2	0	2
Shooting	0	1	1
Swimming	1	4	5
Table tennis	1	2	3
Total	7	16	23

== Athletics ==
Singaporean track and field athletes achieved the entry standards for Paris 2024, either by passing the direct qualifying mark (or time for track and road races) or by world ranking, in the following events (a maximum of 3 athletes each):

Key

- Note–Ranks given for track events are within the athlete's heat only
- **Q** = Qualified for the next round
- **DNS** = Did not start
- **q** = Qualified for the next round as a fastest loser or, in field events, by position without achieving the qualifying target
- **NR** = National record
- N/A = Round not applicable for the event
- Bye = Athlete not required to compete in round

Track & road events

Athlete	Event	Preliminary Round		Heat		Repechage		Semifinal		Final	
Athlete	Event	Result	Rank	Result	Rank	Result	Rank	Result	Rank	Result	Rank
Marc Brian Louis	Men's 100 m	10.43	3 **q**	DNS		—N/a		Did not advance			
Shanti Pereira	Women's 100 m	Bye		11.63	7	—N/a		Did not advance			
Shanti Pereira	Women's 200 m	Bye		23.21	8 **R**	23.45	7	Did not advance			

== Badminton ==
Singapore entered four badminton players into the Olympic tournament based on the BWF Race to Paris Rankings.

Athlete	Event	Group stage				Elimination	Quarter-final	Semi-final	Final / BM	
Athlete	Event	Opposition Score	Opposition Score	Opposition Score	Rank	Opposition Score	Opposition Score	Opposition Score	Opposition Score	Rank
Loh Kean Yew	Men's singles	Louda (CZE); **W** (21–13, 21–10)	Canjura (ESA); **W** (21–13, 21–16)	—N/a	1 **Q**	Shifeng (CHN); **W** (23–21, 21–15)	Axelsen (DEN); **L** (9–21, 17–21)	Did not advance		
Yeo Jia Min	Women's singles	Yavarivafa (EOR); **W** (21–7, 21–8)	Ludik (MRI); **W** (21–12, 21–6)	—N/a	1 **Q**	Aya Ohori (JPN); **L** (21–11, 14–21, 22–24)	Did not advance			
Terry Hee; Jessica Tan	Mixed doubles	Chen / Toh (MAS); **L** (21–23, 12–21)	Feng / Huang (CHN); **L** (13–21, 17–21)	Chiu / Gai (USA); **W** (21–17, 21–12)	3	—N/a	Did not advance			

== Canoeing ==
=== Sprint ===
For the first time since 2012, Singaporean canoeists qualified one boat for the Games through the result of highest rank eligible nation's, through the 2024 Asian Sprint Canoeing Championships in Tokyo, Japan. Stephenie Chen qualifies after finishing 3rd in the Olympic Qualifier K-1 500m event.

Athlete	Event	Heats		Quarterfinals		Semifinals		Final	
Athlete	Event	Time	Rank	Time	Rank	Time	Rank	Time	Rank
Stephenie Chen	Women's K-1 500 m	1:58.52	5	1:53.88	5	1:55.15	6 **FC**	1:56.55	23

Qualification Legend: FA = Qualify to final (medal); FB = Qualify to final B (non-medal)

== Equestrian ==
Singapore entered one equestrian to compete at Paris 2024. Caroline Chew earned a spot at the Paris Olympics after finishing 2nd in the Group G (South East Asia, Oceania) Olympics ranking.

=== Dressage ===
Athlete	Horse	Event	Grand Prix		Grand Prix Freestyle		Overall	
Athlete	Horse	Event	Score	Rank	Technical	Artistic	Score	Rank
Caroline Chew	Zatchmo	Individual	63.351	56	Did not advance			

Qualification Legend: Q = Qualified for the final; q = Qualified for the final as a lucky loser

== Fencing ==
Singapore entered two fencers into the Olympic competition. Tokyo 2020 Olympian, Amita Berthier qualified in the women's foil event through the Asia & Oceania zone FIE Official ranking. Later on, Kiria Tikanah qualified for the games by winning the gold medal in the women's individual épée event, at the 2024 Asia and Oceania Zonal Qualifying Tournament in Dubai, United Arab Emirates.

Athlete	Event	Round of 64	Round of 32	Round of 16	Quarterfinal	Semifinal	Final / BM	
Athlete	Event	Opposition Score	Opposition Score	Opposition Score	Opposition Score	Opposition Score	Opposition Score	Rank
Kiria Tikanah	Women's épée	Doig (PER); **W** 15–14	Santuccio (ITA); **L** 10–15	Did not advance				
Amita Berthier	Women's foil	Bye	Scruggs (USA); **L** 13–15	Did not advance				

== Golf ==
Singapore entered one golfer into the Olympic tournament. Shannon Tan qualified directly for the games in the women's individual competitions, based on her world ranking positions, on the IGF World Rankings.

Athlete	Event	Round 1	Round 2	Round 3	Round 4	Total		
Athlete	Event	Score	Score	Score	Score	Score	Par	Rank
Shannon Tan	Women's	78	70	73	74	295	+7	40

== Rowing ==
Singapore entered one rower for women's single sculls events, through the 2024 Asia & Oceania Qualification Regatta in Chungju, South Korea.

Athlete	Event	Heats		Repechage		Semifinals		Final	
Athlete	Event	Time	Rank	Time	Rank	Time	Rank	Time	Rank
Saiyidah Aisyah	Women's single sculls	8:17.04	5 **R**	8:23.03	4 **SE/F**	8:47.41	2 **FE**	8:03.29	28

Qualification Legend: FA=Final A (medal); FB=Final B (non-medal); FC=Final C (non-medal); FD=Final D (non-medal); FE=Final E (non-medal); FF=Final F (non-medal); SA/B=Semifinals A/B; SC/D=Semifinals C/D; SE/F=Semifinals E/F; QF=Quarterfinals; R=Repechage

== Sailing ==
Singaporean sailors qualified one boat in each of the following classes through the 2023 Sailing World Championships in The Hague, Netherlands and 2022 Asian Games in Hangzhou, China. Max Maeder is the current Asian, European and 2-time World Champion in Formula Kite. The nation won the first ever medal in Sailing.

Elimination events

Athlete	Event	Race																				Final rank
Athlete	Event	1	2	3	4	5	6	7	QF	SF1	SF2	SF3	SF4	SF5	SF6	F1	F2	F3	F4	F5	F6	Final rank
**Max Maeder**	Men's Formula Kite	5	1	2	21 DNF^{†}	3	10 ^{†}	4	—N/a							2	2	3	—N/a			3rd place, bronze medalist(s)

Medal race events

Athlete	Event	Race											Net points	Final rank
Athlete	Event	1	2	3	4	5	6	7	8	9	10	M*	Net points	Final rank
Ryan Lo	Men's ILCA 7	15	8	11	29	23	25	44 BFD	27	—N/a		EL	138	25

M = Medal race; EL = Eliminated – did not advance into the medal race

== Shooting ==
Singaporean shooters achieved quota places for the following events based on ISSF World Olympic Rankings.

Athlete	Event	Qualification		Final	
Athlete	Event	Points	Rank	Points	Rank
Teh Xiu Hong	Women's 25 m pistol	583	12	Did not advance	
Teh Xiu Hong	Women's 10 m pistol	567	32	Did not advance	

== Swimming ==
Singaporean swimmers achieved the entry standards in the following events for Paris 2024 (a maximum of two swimmers in each event under the Olympic Qualifying Time (OST) and potentially at the Olympic Consideration Time (OCT)):

Athlete	Event	Heat		Semifinal		Final	
Athlete	Event	Time	Rank	Time	Rank	Time	Rank
Jonathan Tan	Men's 50 m freestyle	22.26	32	Did not advance			
Jonathan Tan	Men's 100 m freestyle	49.60	38	Did not advance			
Gan Ching Hwee	Women's 800 m freestyle	8:32.37 **NR**	11	—N/a		Did not advance	
Gan Ching Hwee	Women's 1500 m freestyle	16:10:13 **NR**	9	—N/a		Did not advance	
Letitia Sim	Women's 100 m breaststroke	1:07.75	25	Did not advance			
Letitia Sim	Women's 200 m breaststroke	2:29.46	22	Did not advance			
Gan Ching Hwee; Quah Jing Wen; Letitia Sim; Levenia Sim	Women's 4 × 100m medley relay	4:05.58	14	—N/a		Did not advance	

== Table tennis ==
Singapore entered three table tennis players into Paris 2024. Izaac Quek and Zeng Jian qualified for the games by winning the gold medal in their respective events, at the 2024 Southeast Asia Qualification Tournament in Bangkok, Thailand. Later on, Zhou Jingyi qualified for the games through the Asian continental ranking.

Athlete	Event	Preliminary	Round 1	Round 2	Round of 16	Quarterfinals	Semifinals	Final / BM	
Athlete	Event	Opposition Result	Opposition Result	Opposition Result	Opposition Result	Opposition Result	Opposition Result	Opposition Result	Rank
Izaac Quek	Men's singles	Bye	Jorgić (SLO); **L** 2–4	Did not advance					
Zeng Jian	Women's singles	Bye	Malobabić (CRO); **W** 4–3	Akula (IND); **L** 2–4	Did not advance				
Zhou Jingyi	Women's singles	Bye	Szőcs (ROU); **L** 1–4	Did not advance					

== See also ==
- Singapore at the 2024 Winter Youth Olympics
