= Singapore at the 1972 Summer Olympics =

- IOC code: SIN
- NOC: Singapore National Olympic Council

in Munich
- Competitors: 7 (5 men and 2 women) in 3 sports
- Flag bearer: Patricia Chan
- Medals: Gold 0 Silver 0 Bronze 0 Total 0

Summer Olympics appearances (overview)
- 1948; 1952; 1956; 1960; 1964; 1968; 1972; 1976; 1980; 1984; 1988; 1992; 1996; 2000; 2004; 2008; 2012; 2016; 2020; 2024

Singapore competed at the 1972 Summer Olympics in Munich, West Germany.

== Results by event ==
=== Athletics ===
Men's 100 metres

- Yeo Kian Chye

- Heat Two — 10.92s (→ did not advance)

Men's 200 metres

- Yeo Kian Chye

- Heat Two — 21.89s (→ did not advance)

Men's 5000 metres

- P. C. Suppiah

- Heat One— 15:36.6 (→ did not advance)

Men's 10,000 metres

- P. C. Suppiah

- Heat One— 31:59.2 (→ did not advance)

Men's High Jump

- Nor Azhar Hamid

- Qualification Round — 2.00m (→ did not advance)

=== Boxing ===
Men's Light-Flyweight

- Syed Abdul Kadir

=== Swimming ===
Men's 100 metres Butterfly

- Roy Kum Wah Chan

Men's 200 metres Butterfly

- Roy Kum Wah Chan

Men's 200 metres Individual Medley

- Roy Kum Wah Chan

Women's 100 metres Backstroke

- Patricia Li Yin Chan

Women's 100 metres Butterfly

- Tay Chin Joo

Women's 200 metres Backstroke

- Patricia Li Yin Chan

== Sources ==
- "Official Olympic Reports". aafla.org. Archived from the original on 15 October 2006.
- "Official Olympic Reports". la84foundation.org. Archived from the original on 12 June 2007.
- Evans, Hilary; Gjerde, Arild; Heijmans, Jeroen; Mallon, Bill; et al. "Singapore at the 1972 München Summer Games". Olympics at Sports-Reference.com. Sports Reference LLC. Archived from the original on 5 July 2018.
