= Singapore at the 1992 Summer Olympics =

- IOC code: SIN
- NOC: Singapore National Olympic Council
- Website: www.singaporeolympics.com

in Barcelona
- Competitors: 14 (11 men, 3 women) in 6 sports
- Medals: Gold 0 Silver 0 Bronze 0 Total 0

Summer Olympics appearances (overview)
- 1948; 1952; 1956; 1960; 1964; 1968; 1972; 1976; 1980; 1984; 1988; 1992; 1996; 2000; 2004; 2008; 2012; 2016; 2020; 2024

Singapore competed at the 1992 Summer Olympics in Barcelona, Spain. 14 competitors, 11 men and 3 women, took part in 26 events in 6 sports.

== Competitors ==
The following is the list of number of competitors in the Games.

Sport	Men	Women	Total
Badminton	2	1	3
Fencing	2	0	2
Judo	1	0	1
Sailing	2	0	2
Shooting	1	0	1
Swimming	3	2	5
Total	11	3	14

== Badminton ==
Women's Competition

- Zarinah Abdullah

Men's Competition

- Hamid Khan
- Donald Koh

== Fencing ==
Two male fencers represented Singapore in 1992.

Men's foil

- Wong Liang Hun
- Tan Kim Huat

Men's épée

- Wong Liang Hun
- Tan Kim Huat

== Judo ==
Men's Competition

- Ho Yen Chye

== Sailing ==
- Chan Joseph
- Siew Shaw Her

== Shooting ==
- Chng Seng Mok

== Swimming ==
Men's 50m Freestyle

- Kenneth Yeo

- Heat — 25.29 (→ did not advance, 56th place)

Men's 100m Freestyle

- Kenneth Yeo

- Heat — 54.44 (→ did not advance, 56th place)

Men's 200m Freestyle

- Kenneth Yeo

- Heat — 1:57.80 (→ did not advance, 39th place)

Men's 400m Freestyle

- Kenneth Yeo

- Heat — 4:13.45 (→ did not advance, 43rd place)

Men's 200m Backstroke

- Tan V Meng

- Heat — 2:11.36 (→ did not advance, 38th place)

Men's 200m Breaststroke

- Desmond Koh

- Heat — 2:21.87 (→ did not advance, 32nd place)

Men's 100m Butterfly

- Tan V Meng

- Heat — 58.21 (→ did not advance, 51st place)

Men's 200m Butterfly

- Tan V Meng

- Heat — 2:06.41 (→ did not advance, 37th place)

Men's 200m Individual Medley

- Desmond Koh

- Heat — 2:07.16 (→ did not advance, 31st place)

- Tan V Meng

- Heat — 2:11.14 (→ did not advance, 40th place)

Men's 400m Individual Medley

- Desmond Koh

- Heat — 4:28.95 (→ did not advance, 21st place)

Women's 50m Freestyle

- Joscelin Yeo

- Heat — 27.36 (→ did not advance, 34th place)

- May Ooi Yu-fen

- Heat — 28.77 (→ did not advance, 46th place)

Women's 100m Freestyle

- Joscelin Yeo

- Heat — 58.93 (→ did not advance, 33rd place)

Women's 200m Freestyle

- Joscelin Yeo

- Heat — 2:07.09 (→ did not advance, 28th place)

- May Ooi Yu-fen

- Heat — 2:13.20 (→ did not advance, 36th place)

Women's 400m Freestyle

- Joscelin Yeo

- Heat — 4:29.76 (→ did not advance, 28th place)

- May Ooi Yu-fen

- Heat — 4:37.77 (→ did not advance, 32nd place)

Women's 100m Butterfly

- Joscelin Yeo

- Heat — 1:03.82 (→ did not advance, 31st place)

- May Ooi Yu-fen

- Heat — 1:04.14 (→ did not advance, 34th place)

Women's 200m Butterfly

- May Ooi Yu-fen

- Heat — 2:26.97 (→ did not advance, 32nd place)

Women's 200m Individual Medley

- Joscelin Yeo

- Heat — 2:25.32 (→ did not advance, 33rd place)

- May Ooi Yu-fen

- Heat — 2:27.62 (→ did not advance, 36th place)

Women's 400m Individual Medley

- May Ooi Yu-fen

- Heat — 5:08.19 (→ did not advance, 30th place)
