= Singapore at the 2016 Summer Olympics =

- IOC code: SIN
- NOC: Singapore National Olympic Council
- Website: www.singaporeolympics.com

in Rio de Janeiro
- Competitors: 25 in 7 sports
- Flag bearers: Derek Wong Zi Liang (opening); Griselda Khng (closing)
- Medals Ranked 54th: Gold 1 Silver 0 Bronze 0 Total 1

Summer Olympics appearances (overview)
- 1948; 1952; 1956; 1960; 1964; 1968; 1972; 1976; 1980; 1984; 1988; 1992; 1996; 2000; 2004; 2008; 2012; 2016; 2020; 2024; 2028

Singapore competed at the 2016 Summer Olympics in Rio de Janeiro, Brazil, from 5 to 21 August 2016. This was the nation's sixteenth appearance at the Summer Olympics, except for two different editions. Singapore was part of the Malaysian team at the 1964 Summer Olympics in Tokyo, but did not attend at the 1980 Summer Olympics in Moscow, because of its support for the United States boycott.

The Singapore National Olympic Council sent a team of 25 athletes, 9 men and 16 women, to compete in seven different sports at the Games, matching the nation's full roster size with Beijing. For the fourth consecutive time in its Summer Olympic history, the Singaporean roster also featured more female athletes than males. Sailing had the largest team by sport with a total of ten competitors, roughly forty percent of the nation's full roster size; there was only a single competitor in rowing, the country's Olympic debut in Rio de Janeiro.

The Singaporean roster featured nine returning Olympians, with table tennis players Gao Ning and Feng Tianwei, who held a tally of three medals (one silver and two bronze) throughout her Olympic career, headed to their third straight Games. Seven Singaporean athletes, on the other hand, returned for their second appearance in Rio de Janeiro, including rifle shooter Jasmine Ser Xiang Wei, world-ranked butterfly swimmer Joseph Schooling, along with siblings Quah Zheng Wen and Quah Ting Wen, sailors Colin Cheng and Elizabeth Yue Ling Yin, and badminton player Derek Wong Zi Liang, who was selected to lead the delegation as the nation's flag bearer in the opening ceremony, becoming the first male to do so since 2004.

Singapore left Rio de Janeiro with its first ever gold medal in Olympic history. It was awarded to Schooling, who established a new Olympic record to claim the men's 100 m butterfly title.

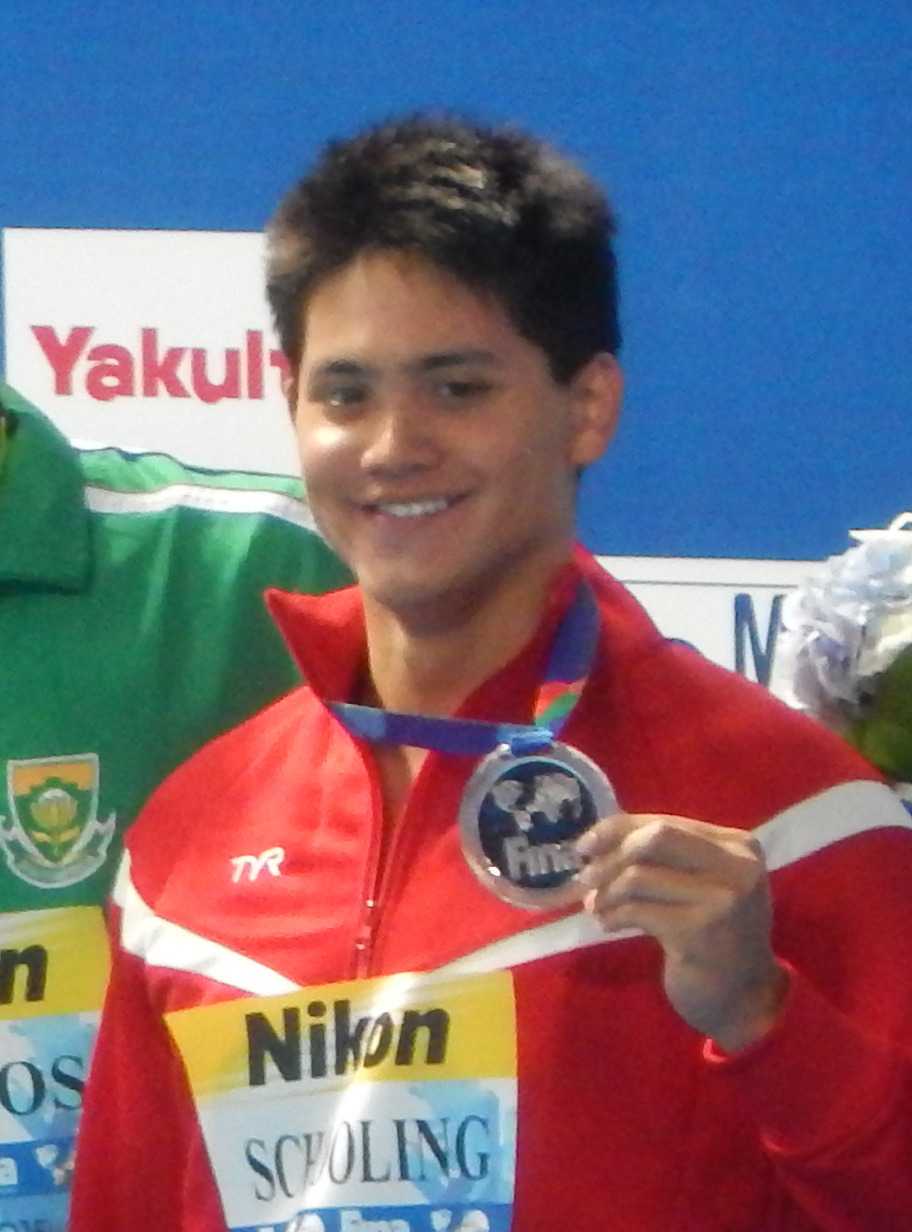
Swimmer Joseph Schooling won Singapore's first ever Olympic gold medal.

== Medalists ==
The following Singaporean competitors won medals at the Games. In the by discipline sections below, medalists' names are bolded.

| Medal | Name | Sport | Event | Date |
|---|---|---|---|---|
| Gold | **Joseph Schooling** | Swimming | Men's 100 m butterfly | 12 August |

== Athletics ==
Singaporean athletes have so far achieved qualifying standards in the following athletics events (up to a maximum of 3 athletes in each event):

Key

- Note–Ranks given for track events are within the athlete's heat only
- **Q** = Qualified for the next round
- **q** = Qualified for the next round as a fastest loser or, in field events, by position without achieving the qualifying target
- **NR** = National record
- N/A = Round not applicable for the event
- Bye = Athlete not required to compete in round

Track & road events

| Athlete | Event | Heat | | Quarterfinal | | Semifinal | | Final | |
| Athlete | Event | Time | Rank | Time | Rank | Time | Rank | Time | Rank |
|---|---|---|---|---|---|---|---|---|---|
| Timothee Yap | Men's 100 m | 10.84 | 2 **Q** | 10.79 | 9 | Did not advance | | | |
| Neo Jie Shi | Women's marathon | —N/a | | | | | | 3:15:18 | 131 |

== Badminton ==
Singapore has qualified two badminton players for each of the following events into the Olympic tournament. London 2012 Olympian Derek Wong Zi Liang and Liang Xiaoyu were selected among the top 34 individual shuttlers each in the men's and women's singles based on the BWF World Rankings as of 5 May 2016.

| Athlete | Event | Group Stage | | | Elimination | Quarterfinal | Semifinal | Final / BM | |
| Athlete | Event | Opposition Score | Opposition Score | Rank | Opposition Score | Opposition Score | Opposition Score | Opposition Score | Rank |
|---|---|---|---|---|---|---|---|---|---|
| Derek Wong Zi Liang | Men's singles | Lee C W (MAS); **L** (18–21, 8–21) | Opti (SUR); **W** (21–5, 21–6) | 2 | Did not advance | | | | |
| Liang Xiaoyu | Women's singles | Sung J-h (KOR); **L** (17–21, 11–21) | Lansac (FRA); **W** (21–7, 21–15) | 2 | Did not advance | | | | |

== Rowing ==
Singapore has qualified one boat in the women's single sculls for the Olympics at the 2016 Asia & Oceania Continental Qualification Regatta in Chungju, South Korea, signifying the nation's Olympic sporting debut.

| Athlete | Event | Heats | | Repechage | | Quarterfinals | | Semifinals | | Final | |
| Athlete | Event | Time | Rank | Time | Rank | Time | Rank | Time | Rank | Time | Rank |
|---|---|---|---|---|---|---|---|---|---|---|---|
| Saiyidah Aisyah | Women's single sculls | 8:44.71 | 3 **QF** | Bye | | 7.56.00 | 6 **SC/D** | 8:22.45 | 6 **FD** | 7:55.73 | 23 |

Qualification Legend: FA=Final A (medal); FB=Final B (non-medal); FC=Final C (non-medal); FD=Final D (non-medal); FE=Final E (non-medal); FF=Final F (non-medal); SA/B=Semifinals A/B; SC/D=Semifinals C/D; SE/F=Semifinals E/F; QF=Quarterfinals; R=Repechage

== Sailing ==
Singaporean sailors have qualified one boat in each of the following classes through the 2014 ISAF Sailing World Championships, the individual fleet Worlds, and Asian qualifying regattas.

Following the completion of the Princess Sofia Trophy, the Singapore Sailing Federation had announced their selection for the men's RS:X, Laser Radial, 49erFX, and Nacra 17 to represent the country at the Rio regatta. The women's 470 crew was added to the squad based on the sailors' results at the World and European Championships. Laser sailor and London 2012 Olympian Colin Cheng Xin Ru rounded out the internal selection for the Singaporeans at the World Championships in Riviera Nayarita, Mexico.

2015 Southeast Asian Games gold medalist Audrey Yong was the last Singaporean sailor chosen to the Olympic team, as the nation received a spare Olympic berth freed up by Canada in the women's RS:X by the International Sailing Federation.

Men

| Athlete | Event | Race | | | | | | | | | | | | | Net points | Final rank |
| Athlete | Event | 1 | 2 | 3 | 4 | 5 | 6 | 7 | 8 | 9 | 10 | 11 | 12 | M* | Net points | Final rank |
|---|---|---|---|---|---|---|---|---|---|---|---|---|---|---|---|---|
| Leonard Ong | RS:X | 33 | 33 | 35 | 33 | ~~DNF~~ | 27 | 36 | DNF | 20 | DNF | 34 | DNF | EL | 362 | 35 |
| Colin Cheng Xin Ru | Laser | 5 | 20 | 13 | 18 | 21 | ~~UFD~~ | 27 | 22 | 25 | 9 | —N/a | | EL | 160 | 20 |

Women

| Athlete | Event | Race | | | | | | | | | | | | | Net points | Final rank |
| Athlete | Event | 1 | 2 | 3 | 4 | 5 | 6 | 7 | 8 | 9 | 10 | 11 | 12 | M* | Net points | Final rank |
|---|---|---|---|---|---|---|---|---|---|---|---|---|---|---|---|---|
| Audrey Yong | RS:X | 25 | 25 | 24 | 25 | 23 | 18 | ~~DNF~~ | 24 | 22 | DNC | DNC | DNC | EL | 266 | 25 |
| Elizabeth Yue Ling Yin | Laser Radial | 19 | 29 | 26 | 11 | 23 | 25 | 20 | 17 | ~~UFD~~ | 23 | —N/a | | EL | 193 | 26 |
| Jovina Choo; Amanda Ng | 470 | 17 | 17 | 20 | ~~21~~ | 18 | 21 | 19 | 17 | 18 | 18 | —N/a | | EL | 166 | 20 |
| Griselda Khng; Sara Tan | 49erFX | 12 | 19 | 17 | 11 | 14 | 11 | 8 | ~~20~~ | 15 | 7 | 8 | 13 | EL | 135 | 15 |

Mixed

| Athlete | Event | Race | | | | | | | | | | | | | Net points | Final rank |
| Athlete | Event | 1 | 2 | 3 | 4 | 5 | 6 | 7 | 8 | 9 | 10 | 11 | 12 | M* | Net points | Final rank |
|---|---|---|---|---|---|---|---|---|---|---|---|---|---|---|---|---|
| Justin Liu; Denise Lim | Nacra 17 | 2 | 14 | 14 | ~~18~~ | 18 | 17 | 14 | 14 | 18 | 17 | 21 | 11 | EL | 157 | 19 |

M = Medal race; EL = Eliminated – did not advance into the medal race

== Shooting ==
Singaporean shooters have achieved quota places for the following events by virtue of their best finishes at the 2014 and 2015 ISSF World Championships, the 2015 ISSF World Cup series, and Asian Championships, as long as they obtained a minimum qualifying score (MQS) by March 31, 2016. For the first time in the nation's Olympic history, Singapore will enter two sport shooters at the Games on a qualifying merit.

| Athlete | Event | Qualification | | Semifinal | | Final | |
| Athlete | Event | Points | Rank | Points | Rank | Points | Rank |
|---|---|---|---|---|---|---|---|
| Jasmine Ser Xiang Wei | Women's 10 m air rifle | 413.5 | 25 | —N/a | | Did not advance | |
| Jasmine Ser Xiang Wei | Women's 50 m rifle 3 positions | 568 | 34 | —N/a | | Did not advance | |
| Teo Shun Xie | Women's 10 m air pistol | 375 | 37 | —N/a | | Did not advance | |
| Teo Shun Xie | Women's 25 m pistol | 571 | 29 | Did not advance | | | |

Qualification Legend: Q = Qualify for the next round; q = Qualify for the bronze medal (shotgun)

== Swimming ==
Singaporean swimmers have so far achieved qualifying standards in the following events (up to a maximum of 2 swimmers in each event at the Olympic Qualifying Time (OQT), and potentially 1 at the Olympic Selection Time (OST)):

2015 Worlds bronze medalist Joseph Schooling, and siblings Quah Ting Wen and Quah Zheng Wen were the only swimmers to be named to the Singaporean roster for the Games, the smallest in more than three decades.

| Athlete | Event | Heat | | Semifinal | | Final | |
| Athlete | Event | Time | Rank | Time | Rank | Time | Rank |
|---|---|---|---|---|---|---|---|
| Quah Zheng Wen | Men's 100 m backstroke | 54.38 | 22 | Did not advance | | | |
| Quah Zheng Wen | Men's 100 m butterfly | 52.08 | 16 **Q** | 52.26 | 15 | Did not advance | |
| Quah Zheng Wen | Men's 200 m butterfly | 1:56.01 | 10 **Q** | 1:56.11 | 10 | Did not advance | |
| **Joseph Schooling** | Men's 100 m freestyle | 48.27 | 6 **Q** | 48.70 | 16 | Did not advance | |
| **Joseph Schooling** | Men's 100 m butterfly | 51.41 | 1 **Q** | 50.83 **AS** | 1 **Q** | 50.39 **OR**, **AS** | 1st place, gold medalist(s) |
| Quah Ting Wen | Women's 100 m butterfly | 1:00.88 | 34 | Did not advance | | | |

== Table tennis ==
Singapore has fielded a team of five athletes into the table tennis competition at the Games. London 2012 bronze medalist Feng Tianwei and 2015 Commonwealth champion Chen Feng secured the Olympic spot each in the men's and women's singles as the highest-ranked player coming from the Southeast Asia zone at the Asian Qualification Tournament in Hong Kong. Meanwhile, Gao Ning and Yu Mengyu were automatically selected among the top 22 eligible players each in their respective singles events based on the ITTF Olympic Rankings.

| Athlete | Event | Preliminary | Round 1 | Round 2 | Round 3 | Round of 16 | Quarterfinals | Semifinals | Final / BM | |
| Athlete | Event | Opposition Result | Opposition Result | Opposition Result | Opposition Result | Opposition Result | Opposition Result | Opposition Result | Opposition Result | Rank |
|---|---|---|---|---|---|---|---|---|---|---|
| Chen Feng | Men's singles | | Oláh (FIN); **L** 1–4 | Did not advance | | | | | | |
| Gao Ning | Men's singles | Bye | | Drinkhall (GBR); **L** 3–4 | Did not advance | | | | | |
| Feng Tianwei | Women's singles | Bye | | | Ni Xl (LUX); **W** 4–2 | Liu J (AUT); **W** 4–1 | Fukuhara (JPN); **L** 0–4 | Did not advance | | |
| Yu Mengyu | Women's singles | Bye | | | Lay J F (AUS); **W** 4–0 | Jeon J-h (KOR); **W** 4–1 | Kim S-i (PRK); **L** 2–4 | Did not advance | | |
| Feng Tianwei; Yu Mengyu; Zhou Yihan | Women's team | —N/a | | | | Egypt; **W** 3–0 | South Korea; **W** 3–2 | China; **L** 0–3 | Japan; **L** 1–3 | 4 |

== See also ==
- Singapore at the 2016 Summer Paralympics
