= Singapore at the 1976 Summer Olympics =

- IOC code: SIN
- NOC: Singapore National Olympic Council

in Montreal
- Competitors: 4 (3 men and 1 woman) in 4 sports
- Flag bearer: Koh Eng Kian
- Medals: Gold 0 Silver 0 Bronze 0 Total 0

Summer Olympics appearances (overview)
- 1948; 1952; 1956; 1960; 1964; 1968; 1972; 1976; 1980; 1984; 1988; 1992; 1996; 2000; 2004; 2008; 2012; 2016; 2020; 2024

Singapore competed at the 1976 Summer Olympics in Montreal, Quebec, Canada.

== Results by event ==
=== Athletics ===
- Chee Swee Lee

=== Judo ===
- Koh Eng Kian

=== Shooting ===
- Frank Oh

=== Weightlifting ===
- Chua Koon Siong
