= Singapore at the 1996 Summer Olympics =

- IOC code: SIN
- NOC: Singapore National Olympic Council
- Website: www.singaporeolympics.com

in Atlanta
- Competitors: 14 (9 men and 5 women) in 6 sports
- Flag bearer: Lee Wung Yew
- Medals: Gold 0 Silver 0 Bronze 0 Total 0

Summer Olympics appearances (overview)
- 1948; 1952; 1956; 1960; 1964; 1968; 1972; 1976; 1980; 1984; 1988; 1992; 1996; 2000; 2004; 2008; 2012; 2016; 2020; 2024

Singapore was represented at the 1996 Summer Olympics in Atlanta, Georgia, United States by the Singapore National Olympic Council.

In total, 14 athletes including nine men and five woman represented Singapore in six different sports including athletics, badminton, sailing, shooting, swimming and table tennis.

== Competitors ==
In total, 14 athletes represented Singapore at the 1996 Summer Olympics in Atlanta, Georgia, United States across six different sports.

Sport	Men	Women	Total
Athletics	1	1	2
Badminton	0	1	1
Sailing	3	1	4
Shooting	1	0	1
Swimming	4	1	5
Table tennis	0	1	1
Total	9	5	14

== Athletics ==
In total, two Singaporean athletes participated in the athletics events – Yvonne Danson in the women's marathon and Wong Yew Tong in the men's high jump.

== Badminton ==
In total, one Singaporean athlete participated in the badminton events – Zarinah Abdullah in the women's singles.

== Sailing ==
In total, four Singaporean athletes participated in the sailing events – Siew Shaw Her and Charles Lim in the men's 470, Benedict Tan in the laser and Tracey Tan in the Europe.

== Shooting ==
In total, one Singaporean athlete participated in the shooting events – Lee Wung Yew in the men's trap.

== Swimming ==
In total, five Singaporean athletes participated in the swimming events – Sng Ju Wei in the men's 50 m freestyle, the men's 100 m freestyle, the men's 200 m freestyle, the men's 400 m freestyle, the men's 4 x 200 metre freestyle relay and the men's 4 × 100 m medley relay, Desmond Koh in the men's 100 m breaststroke, the men's 200 m breaststroke, the men's 200 m individual medley and the men's 400 m individual medley, the men's 4 x 200 metre freestyle relay and the men's 4 × 100 m medley relay, Gerald Koh in the men's 100 m backstroke, the men's 200 m backstroke, the men's 200 m individual medley, the men's 4 x 200 metre freestyle relay and the men's 4 × 100 m medley relay, Thum Ping Tjin in the men's 100 m butterfly, the men's 200 m butterfly, the men's 4 x 200 metre freestyle relay and the men's 4 × 100 m medley relay and Joscelin Yeo in the women's 50 m freestyle, the women's 100 m freestyle, the women's 200 m freestyle, the women's 100 m breaststroke, the women's 100 m butterfly and the women's 200 m individual medley.

== Table tennis ==
In total, one Singaporean athlete participated in the table tennis events – Jing Jun Hong in the women's singles.
