= Singapore at the 1968 Summer Olympics =

- IOC code: SIN
- NOC: Singapore National Olympic Council

in Mexico City
- Competitors: 4 in 3 sports
- Medals: Gold 0 Silver 0 Bronze 0 Total 0

Summer Olympics appearances (overview)
- 1948; 1952; 1956; 1960; 1964; 1968; 1972; 1976; 1980; 1984; 1988; 1992; 1996; 2000; 2004; 2008; 2012; 2016; 2020; 2024

Singapore competed at the 1968 Summer Olympics in Mexico City, Mexico, for the first time as a fully independent country. Four competitors, all men, took part in six events in three sports.

== Athletics ==
Men's 100 metres

- Canagasabai Kunalan

1. First round : 10.4 s
2. Second round : 10.3 s (did not advance)

Men's 200 metres

- Canagasabai Kunalan — Heats: 21.3 s (did not advance)

== Shooting ==
One male shooter represented Singapore in 1968.

25 m pistol

- Loh Kok Heng — 566 points (→ 46th place)

50 m pistol

- Loh Kok Heng — 499 points (→ 66th place)

== Swimming ==
- Patricia Chan — did not start any of the six events she was entered

== Weightlifting ==
Bantamweight

- Chye Hong-Tung

1. Press: 92.5 kg
2. Snatch: 87.5 kg
3. Jerk: 122.5 kg
4. Total: 302.5 kg (→ 12th place)

Featherweight

- Chua Phung Kim — disqualified
