= René Concepcion =

Filipino swimmer, artist, teacher (born 1969)

Rene Francisco Concepcion
Personal information
- Nickname: Guy
- Nationality: Filipino
- Born: 30 January 1969 (age 57) San Francisco, California, USA
- Height: 5'8

Sport
- Sport: Swimming
- College team: University of California Berkeley
Medal record
Representing Philippines
SEA Games
Gold medal – first place	1987 Jakarta	200m individual medley
Silver medal – second place	1985 Bangkok	400m freestyle
Silver medal – second place	1985 Bangkok	100m breaststroke
Silver medal – second place	1985 Bangkok	400m individual medley
Silver medal – second place	1985 Bangkok	4x200m freestyle relay
Silver medal – second place	1987 Jakarta	400m freestyle
Silver medal – second place	1987 Jakarta	400m individual medley
Bronze medal – third place	1985 Bangkok	4x100m freestyle relay

Rene Francisco "Guy" Concepcion (born 30 January 1969) is a Filipino swimmer. He competed in four events at the 1988 Summer Olympics.
