= Lee Concepcion =

Filipino swimmer

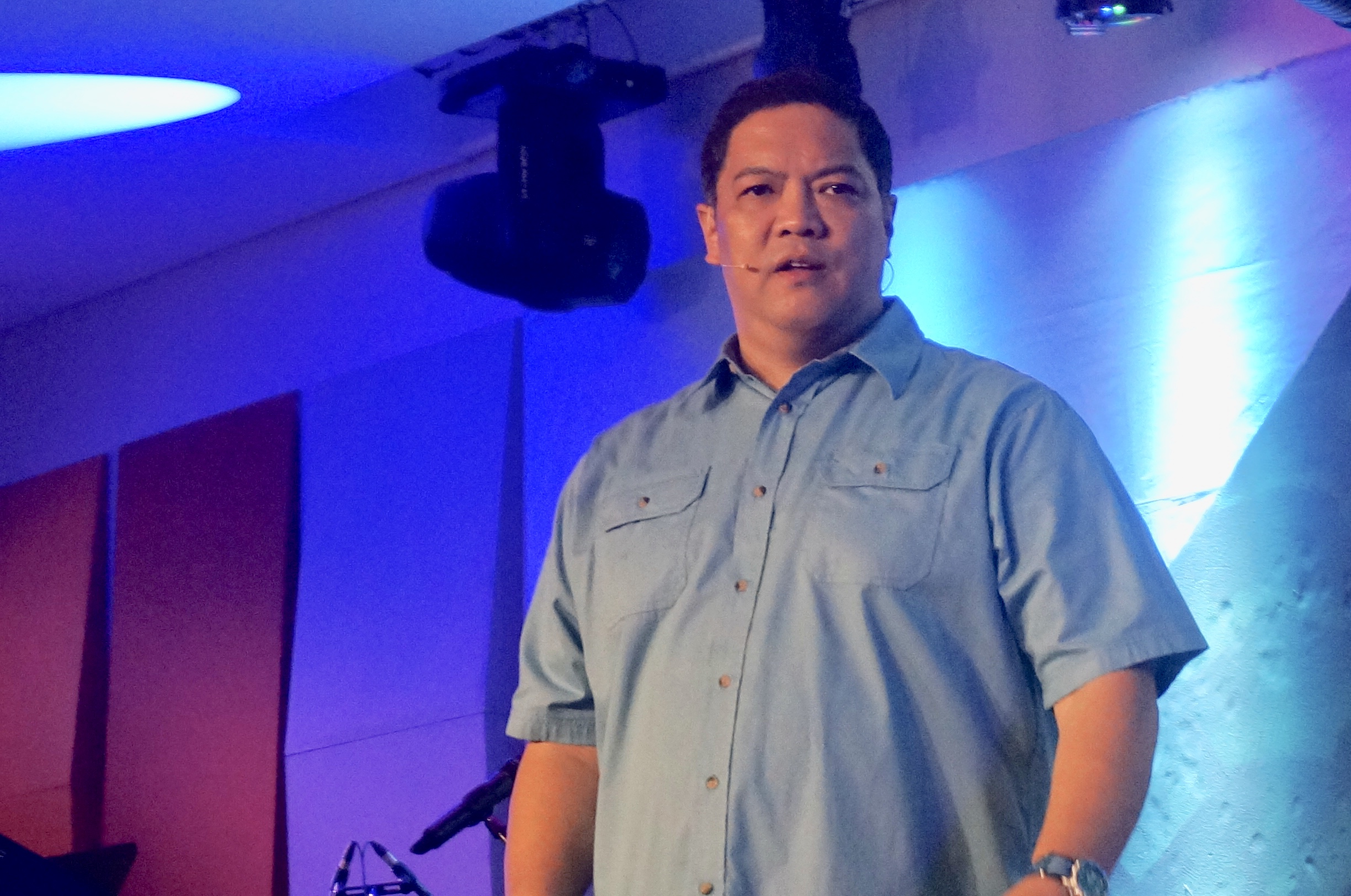

Personal information
- National team: Philippines
- Born: November 17, 1967 (age 58)

Sport
- Sport: Swimming
- Strokes: Breaststroke
Medal record
Men's swimming
Representing Philippines
Southeast Asian Games
Gold medal – first place	1991 Manila	200 m breaststroke
Bronze medal – third place	1993 Jakarta	100 m breaststroke
Bronze medal – third place	1991 Manila	100 m breaststroke
Bronze medal – third place	1987 Jakarta	200 m breaststroke
Bronze medal – third place	1987 Jakarta	100 m breaststroke

Lee Patrick Concepcion (born November 17, 1967) is a Filipino swimmer who has participated at the Summer Olympic Games.

== Education ==
Concepcion graduated from his elementary studies at La Salle Greenhills. He studied at the high school department of the same school as a prep freshman before moving to Serra High School in San Mateo, California in the United States in 1982. For his collegiate studies, he attended the University of California-Berkeley where he attained a degree in political science in 1990. In 2004, he earned a master's degree in leadership ministry at the Victory Leadership Institute in Global City.

== Swimming career ==
Concepcion's mother taught him how to swim when he was five. His first tournament was a novice meet at the Rizal Memorial Sports Complex in October 1975 where he finished first, second, and third in three separate events. He began to pursue to participate at the Olympics after watching the 1976 Summer Olympics and was encouraged by his father. He began to finish well in ASEAN age group competitions in 1978. He finished fourth in the 10-and-under 50 meter breaststroke in that year.

Concepcion held the national record in the 200-meter breaststroke from 1988 to 2004. He participated at the 1985 Southeast Asian Games and 1991 edition where he garnered medals. He participated at the 100-meter and 200-meter breaststroke events at the 1988 Summer Olympics and at the 100-meter and 200-meter breaststroke and the 4x100 medley relay events at the 1992 edition of the Games.

== Post-retirement ==
He has been a pastor of Victory since 2002. Concepcion served as pastor of Victory Ortigas, Victory Greenhills, and at Victory Pioneer.
