= Nurul Huda Abdullah =

Malaysian swimmer

Nurul Huda Abdullah OLY
Personal information
- Full name: Nurul Huda Abdullah OLY
- Nickname: Ch’ng Su-Lin
- Nationality: Malaysia
- Born: 31 July 1972 (age 54) Selangor, Malaysia

Sport
- Sport: Swimming
- Strokes: Freestyle; Individual Medley
Medal record
Women's Swimming
Representing Malaysia
Asian Games
Silver medal – second place	1986 Seoul	400m freestyle
Silver medal – second place	1986 Seoul	800m freestyle
Bronze medal – third place	1986 Seoul	200m freestyle
Bronze medal – third place	1986 Seoul	400m ind. medley
Asian Swimming Championships
Silver medal – second place	1988 Guangzhou	400m freestyle
Silver medal – second place	1988 Guangzhou	800m freestyle
Bronze medal – third place	1988 Guangzhou	200m freestyle
South-East Asian Games
Gold medal – first place	1985 Bangkok	100m freestyle
Gold medal – first place	1985 Bangkok	200m freestyle
Gold medal – first place	1985 Bangkok	400m freestyle
Gold medal – first place	1985 Bangkok	800m freestyle
Silver medal – second place	1985 Bangkok	100m butterfly
Gold medal – first place	1985 Bangkok	200m butterfly
Gold medal – first place	1985 Bangkok	200m ind. medley
Gold medal – first place	1985 Bangkok	400m ind. medley
Bronze medal – third place	1985 Bangkok	4x100m free relay
Gold medal – first place	1987 Jakarta	100m freestyle
Gold medal – first place	1987 Jakarta	200m freestyle
Gold medal – first place	1987 Jakarta	400m freestyle
Gold medal – first place	1987 Jakarta	800m freestyle
Gold medal – first place	1987 Jakarta	100m butterfly
Gold medal – first place	1987 Jakarta	200m butterfly
Silver medal – second place	1987 Jakarta	200m ind. medley
Gold medal – first place	1987 Jakarta	400m ind. medley
Silver medal – second place	1989 Kuala Lumpur	100m freestyle
Gold medal – first place	1989 Kuala Lumpur	200m freestyle
Gold medal – first place	1989 Kuala Lumpur	400m freestyle
Gold medal – first place	1989 Kuala Lumpur	800m freestyle
Silver medal – second place	1989 Kuala Lumpur	100m butterfly
Gold medal – first place	1989 Kuala Lumpur	200m butterfly
Gold medal – first place	1989 Kuala Lumpur	200m ind. medley
Gold medal – first place	1989 Kuala Lumpur	400m ind. medley
Gold medal – first place	1989 Kuala Lumpur	200m backstroke
Gold medal – first place	1989 Kuala Lumpur	4x100m medley relay

Nurul Huda Abdullah OLY, also known as Ch'ng Su-Lin, AMN (born 31 July 1972) is a Malaysian former competitive swimmer.

She is the most successful Malaysian athlete at the Southeast Asian Games (SEA Games), with the highest number of gold medals won - a total of 22 gold, 4 silver and 1 bronze medal in the swimming events at three SEA Games editions from 1985 to 1989 – a record that remains until today.

She was the first Malaysian swimmer to win medals at the Asian Games and remains the only Malaysian female swimmer to have won medals at the Asian Games and Asian Swimming Championships, with a total of 4 silver and 3 bronze medals.

She participated in the swimming events at the 1988 Summer Olympic Games in Seoul, South Korea.

As a result of her swimming achievements, she was the first Malaysian to be awarded an IOC Trophy from the International Olympic Committee in 1987, and was inducted into the Olympic Council of Malaysia (OCM) Hall of Fame in 2004. She was awarded the Malaysian Sportswoman of the Year for five consecutive years from 1985 to 1989.

She was the Chef-de-Mission for the Malaysian Contingent to the 33rd SEA Games (2025) in Thailand, and Deputy Chef-de-Mission to the 30th SEA Games (2019) in Philippines.

== Swimming career ==
=== Southeast Asian Games ===
Nurul competed in 4 editions of the SEA Games from 1983 to 1989, and won a total of 22 gold, 4 silver and 1 bronze medals.

This achievement makes her Malaysia's most successful athlete at the SEA Games, holding the record of the most number of gold medals won at the SEA Games, a record which still stands today.

==== 12th SEA Games Singapore (1983) ====
This was Nurul's first participation at the SEA Games, as a young 10-year old.

She competed in 2 events, where she ranked 4th in the 400m individual medley, and 8th in the 800m freestyle.

==== 13th SEA Games Bangkok (1985) ====
1985 SEA Games Bangkok
Gold medal – first place	100m freestyle	59.51 (GR, NR)
Gold medal – first place	200m freestyle	2:07.77 (GR, NR)
Gold medal – first place	400m freestyle	4:25.39 (GR, NR)
Gold medal – first place	800m freestyle	8:58.29 (GR, NR)
Gold medal – first place	200m butterfly	2:22.54 (NR)
Gold medal – first place	200m ind. medley	2:24.61 (NR)
Gold medal – first place	400m ind. medley	5:01.19 (GR, NR)
Silver medal – second place	100m butterfly	1:06.07
Bronze medal – third place	4x100m free relay	4:10.55

Nurul's second SEA Games outing proved more successful.

Competing in 9 events, she won a total of 7 gold, 1 silver and 1 bronze medals, and breaking 6 SEA Games records at the same time.

During this competition, she became the first female in Southeast Asia to break 1 minute for the 100m freestyle, and 9 minutes for the 800m freestyle.

==== 14th SEA Games Jakarta (1987) ====
1987 SEA Games Jakarta
Gold medal – first place	100m freestyle	59.32 (GR, NR)
Gold medal – first place	200m freestyle	2:05.95 (GR, NR)
Gold medal – first place	400m freestyle	4:23.88 (GR, NR)
Gold medal – first place	800m freestyle	9:12.38
Gold medal – first place	100m butterfly	1:04.16 (GR, NR)
Gold medal – first place	200m butterfly	2:18.74 (GR, NR)
Gold medal – first place	400m ind. medley	5:02.41
Silver medal – second place	200m ind. medley	2:24.55 (NR)

Despite experiencing a health setback 3 months prior to the Games where she contracted glandular fever, Nurul managed to continue her winning streak at the 1987 SEA Games.

She showed her prowess in the 8 events she competed in, winning a total of 7 gold and 1 silver medals.

==== 15th SEA Games Kuala Lumpur (1989) ====
1989 SEA Games Kuala Lumpur
Gold medal – first place	200m freestyle	2:05.75 (GR)
Gold medal – first place	400m freestyle	4:21.58 (GR)
Gold medal – first place	800m freestyle	9:06.67
Gold medal – first place	200m backstroke	2:23.65 (NR)
Gold medal – first place	200m butterfly	2:18.76
Gold medal – first place	200m ind. medley	2:22.74 (GR, NR)
Gold medal – first place	400m ind. medley	4:59.61 (GR)
Gold medal – first place	4x100m medley relay	4:28.94
Silver medal – second place	100m freestyle	1:00.04
Silver medal – second place	100m butterfly	1:04.81

Nurul's fourth and last participation in the regional multi-sport games was also her most successful.

Competing in 10 events in this edition, she won a total of 8 gold and 2 silver medals, breaking 4 SEA Games records and 2 national records in the process.

As a result of her performances at the Games, she was awarded the Most Valuable Athlete (Female) of the 15th SEA Games Kuala Lumpur 1989.

=== Commonwealth Games ===
Despite being selected to participate in two editions of the Commonwealth Games, Nurul was never able to participate in the Commonwealth Games, due to circumstances out of her control.

==== 13th Commonwealth Games Edinburgh (1986) ====
Nurul did not participate in this edition of the Commonwealth Games due to Malaysia's decision to boycott the 1986 Commonwealth Games.

==== 14th Commonwealth Games Auckland (1990) ====
Nurul withdrew from participation for this edition of the Commonwealth due to minor injuries suffered when her family vehicle was involved in a minor collision with a semi-trailer in the weeks leading up to the Games.

=== Asian Games ===
Nurul competed in 2 editions of the Asian Games, in 1986 and 1990, and won a total of 2 silver and 2 bronze medals in the swimming events.

This achievement makes her Malaysia's most successful athlete (female) in the swimming events at the Asian Games.

She was the first Malaysian athlete to win medals in the swimming events at the Asian Games, and remains the only Malaysian female swimmer to have done so.

==== 10th Asian Games Seoul (1986) ====
1986 Asian Games Seoul
Silver medal – second place	400m freestyle	4:20.49 (NR)
Silver medal – second place	800m freestyle	8:50.44 (NR)
Bronze medal – third place	200m freestyle	2:06.24
Bronze medal – third place	400m ind. medley	4:57.73 (NR)

In her maiden appearance at the Asian Games, she won 2 silver and 2 bronze medals out of the 4 swimming events she competed in.

She was the first Malaysian athlete to win medals in the swimming events at the Asian Games.

During this competition, she also became the first female in Southeast Asia to break 5 minutes for the 400m individual medley.

==== 11th Asian Games Beijing (1990) ====
This edition of the Asian Games was the final competition in Nurul's swimming career.

She competed in 3 swimming events but did not win any medals.

==== 3rd Asian Swimming Championships Guangzhou (1988) ====
1988 Asian Swimming Championships Guangzhou
Silver medal – second place	400m freestyle	4:17.66 (NR)
Silver medal – second place	800m freestyle	8:47.98
Bronze medal – third place	200m freestyle	2:05.59 (NR)

She competed in 3 events and won 2 silver and 1 bronze medals.

=== Olympic Games ===
==== XXIVth Summer Olympic Games Seoul (1988) ====
Nurul competed in 3 swimming events at the 1988 Seoul Olympic Games where she ranked 19th in the 800m freestyle, ranked 23rd in the 400m freestyle, and ranked 27th in the 200m freestyle.

== Other sporting achievements and accolades ==
- Malaysian athlete with the most number of gold medals won at the Southeast Asian Games (SEA Games)
- First Malaysian to win medals in the swimming events at the Asian Games
- The only Malaysian female swimmer to win medals at the Asian Games and Asian Swimming Championships
- Winner of the Malaysian Sportswoman of the Year in 1985, 1986, 1987, 1988, 1989
- Winner of the IOC Trophy for Women in Sport (in 1987) and the first Malaysian to win this trophy
- First female swimmer in Southeast Asia to break the 5 minute mark for the 400m individual medley
- First female swimmer in Southeast Asia to break the 60 seconds mark for the 100m freestyle
- First female swimmer in Southeast Asia to break the 9 minute mark for the 800m freestyle
- Held Malaysian Open records in swimming in 10 individual events out of 12 during her swimming career
- Had faster times than the Malaysian Open records for men in 2 events during her swimming career

== Personal life ==
Nurul is the granddaughter of the 4th President of Singapore, Dr. Wee Kim Wee.

== Honour ==
=== Honour of Malaysia ===
- Malaysia :
  - Member of the Order of the Defender of the Realm (AMN) (1989)
