= P. C. Suppiah =

Malaysia-born Singaporean long-distance runner

Personal information
- Born: 10 August 1949 (age 76) Malacca Town, Malacca, Malaysia
- Height: 168 cm (5 ft 6 in) (1972)
- Weight: 54 kg (119 lb) (1972)

Sport
- Country: Singapore
- Sport: Athletics
- Events: 5000 metres, 10,000 metres

Achievements and titles
- Personal bests: 5000 m – 15:10.6 (1973); 10,000 m – 31:19.0 (1973)
Medal record
Men's athletics
Representing Singapore
Southeast Asian Peninsular Games
Gold medal – first place	1971 Kuala Lumpur	10,000 metres
Silver medal – second place	1971 Kuala Lumpur	5000 metres
Silver medal – second place	1973 Singapore	5000 metres

P. C. Suppiah (born 10 August 1949) is a Malaysia-born Singaporean former athlete. His full name may be P. Chinakaruppan Suppiah or Phang Cue Suppiah. He was Singapore's first long-distance runner at the Olympics.

Suppiah was born in Malacca Town, in the Malaysian state of Malacca. He moved to Singapore as a child after his father's death. Suppiah became a citizen of Singapore one day before competing in the 1971 Southeast Asian Peninsular Games, where he won a gold medal in the 10,000 metres and a silver in the 5000 metres. A year later, he competed for Singapore at the 1972 Summer Olympics in the men's 5000 metres and 10,000 metres events. At the 1973 Southeast Asian Peninsular Games, he won a silver medal in the 5000 metres event.
