= Ng Yue Meng =

Singaporean swimmer (born 1970)

Personal information
- Nationality: Singaporean
- Born: 21 February 1970 (age 56)

Sport
- Sport: Swimming
Medal record
Representing Singapore
SEA Games
Gold medal – first place	1987 Jakarta	4x100m medley relay
Silver medal – second place	1987 Jakarta	100m breaststroke

Ng Yue Meng (born 21 February 1970) is a retired Singaporean breaststroke swimmer. He competed in three events at the 1988 Summer Olympics.
