= Ang Peng Siong =

Singaporean swimmer (born 1962)

Ang Peng Siong BBM
Personal information
- Nickname: Asia’s "Flying Fish"
- Nationality: Singapore
- Born: 27 October 1962 (age 64) State of Singapore
- Height: 180 cm (71 in)
- Weight: 75 kg (165 lb)
- Spouse: Wendy (m. 1990)

Sport
- Sport: Swimming
- Strokes: Freestyle; butterfly
- Coach: Phil Hansel (1980–1986)
Medal record
Men's swimming
Representing Singapore
Asian Games
Gold medal – first place	1982 New Delhi	100 m freestyle
Silver medal – second place	1990 Beijing	50 m freestyle
Bronze medal – third place	1982 New Delhi	100 m butterfly
Bronze medal – third place	1986 Seoul	100 m freestyle
Bronze medal – third place	1986 Seoul	4×100 m freestyle
Bronze medal – third place	1990 Beijing	4×100 m freestyle
SEA Games
Gold medal – first place	1983 Singapore	100 m freestyle
Gold medal – first place	1985 Bangkok	100 m freestyle
Gold medal – first place	1985 Bangkok	4×100 m freestyle
Gold medal – first place	1985 Bangkok	4×200 m freestyle
Gold medal – first place	1985 Bangkok	4×100 m medley
Gold medal – first place	1987 Jakarta	100 m freestyle
Gold medal – first place	1989 Kuala Lumpur	100 m butterfly
Gold medal – first place	1991 Manila	50 m freestyle
Gold medal – first place	1993 Singapore	50 m freestyle
Silver medal – second place	1977 Kuala Lumpur	4×100 m freestyle
Silver medal – second place	1989 Kuala Lumpur	100 m freestyle
Silver medal – second place	1991 Manila	4×100 m freestyle
Bronze medal – third place	1991 Manila	4×100 m medley

Ang Peng Siong (Note: Chinese: 洪秉祥; Pe̍h-ōe-jī: Âng Péng-siông; pinyin: Hóng Bǐngxiáng) BBM (born 27 October 1962) is a Singaporean former competitive swimmer and coach. A two-time Olympian, Ang set national records in swimming for the 50 m freestyle at 22.69 seconds and the 100 m freestyle at 51.09 seconds, which stood for 33 and 27 years, respectively.

Having trained in swimming since he was young, he made his swimming debut at the 1977 SEA Games and participated at the 1978 Asian Games. Ang's performance at the 1980 Hawaii International Invitational Swimming Championship, where he attained a time of 23.22 seconds in the 50 m freestyle, led him to be offered a scholarship and he subsequently attended the University of Houston, where he trained under American coach Phil Hansel from 1980 to 1986. At the 1982 United States Swimming Championships, he set the national record in the 50 m freestyle with 22.69 seconds, being named the "World's Fastest Swimmer" by magazine Swimming World. He would make subsequent appearances at the SEA Games and the Asian Games throughout the 1980s to 1990s in swimming.

Upon not receiving sufficient funding for training in the United States for the 1994 Asian Games, Ang announced his retirement from competitive swimming in August 1993. He has since worked as a coach, previously serving as Singapore's head national swimming coach from 1998 to 2012. Ang was ranked fifth in a public poll of Singapore's fifty best sportspeople of the century held by The Straits Times in 1999. He was also named Sportsman of the Year by the Singapore National Olympic Council for three consecutive years from 1982 to 1984.

== Early life and education ==
Ang was born on 27 October 1962 in the State of Singapore, the fourth of five children to Ang Teck Bee and Lily Ho; his father Teck Bee was a judoist who had previously participated in judo at the 1964 Summer Olympics. Ang was taught how to swim at the age of five by his father, who set him on a weight training routine. He studied at Anderson Secondary School while training with swim coaches from Anglo-Chinese School, later moving to Anglo-Chinese School and continuing his education and training with them. Ang first represented Singapore at the 1977 SEA Games in Kuala Lumpur, Malaysia, where he won a silver medal in the 4 × 100 m freestyle relay. He then participated at the 1978 Asian Games in Bangkok, Thailand.

In 1980, Ang participated at the Hawaii International Invitational Swimming Championship, where he attained a personal best time of 23.22 seconds in the 50 m freestyle, placing him fourth in the event. Additionally, Ang was the only non-American swimmer to reach the 50 m freestyle finals, and his time ranked him as the world's fifteenth fastest swimmer at the time. As a result of his performance, he received four-year scholarship offers from both the University of Hawaii and the University of Houston. Ang subsequently took up the University of Houston's scholarship, where he trained under American swimming coach Phil Hansel from 1980 to 1986.

== Career ==
=== Competitive swimming career ===
In August 1982, he participated at the World Aquatics Championships in Guayaquil, Ecuador, being the sole representative of Singapore; Ang was invited by the Singapore Amateur Swimming Association (SASA) to participate. Although he failed to qualify, he set a personal best of 52.56 seconds in the 100 m freestyle. He also swam a time of 58.02 seconds in the 100 m butterfly, beating the previous national record holder Richard Quek's time of 59.72 seconds. Later that month, Ang participated at the United States Swimming Championships in Indiana, where he won the 50 m freestyle in 22.69 seconds, which was a national record; it stood for 33 years before being broken by Joseph Schooling at the 2015 SEA Games. For his achievement, he was named the "World's Fastest Swimmer" that year by magazine Swimming World.

Ang then represented Singapore at the 1982 Asian Games in Delhi, India, where he won gold in the 100 m freestyle and bronze in the 100 m butterfly. In October, Ang participated at the 1982 Commonwealth Games in Brisbane, Australia, where he placed fourth in the 100 m butterfly. In 1983, Ang won the 50-yard freestyle race at the National Collegiate Athletic Association's (NCAA) Division One Swimming Championships. In the following year, he placed second in the same event. In acknowledgement of his efforts, Ang was named Sportsman of the Year by the Singapore National Olympic Council for three consecutive years from 1982 to 1984.

Ang represented Singapore at the 1984 Summer Olympics in Los Angeles, California, where he participated in the 100 m freestyle. He won the 100 m freestyle consolation finals, (Note: The first eight fastest swimmers advanced to the finals, or "Final A", while the next eight advanced to the consolation finals, or "Final B". By placing first in the consolation finals, he placed ninth overall.) placing ninth overall in the event. With a time of 51.09 seconds, it was his new personal best in 100 m freestyle, and it stood as a national record for 27 years, later being broken by Bryan Tay at the 2007 SEA Games with his time of 51.00 seconds. (Note: Tay's time was set as the first leg of a 4 × 100 m relay.) That same year, it was reported that he had switched majors from physical education to recreation as he "[didn't] want to have to spend more time [in the United States] than [he had] to".

At the 1985 SEA Games in Bangkok, Thailand, Ang participated in the 100 m freestyle, where he won gold with a time of 52.42 seconds. He was named in the Singapore Sport Hall of Fame in 1985, alongside other sportspeople. At the 1986 Asian Games, Ang competed in the 100 m freestyle and the 100 m butterfly, where he earned a bronze in the 100 m freestyle with his time of 51.09 seconds. He also won bronze in the 4 × 100 m freestyle relay alongside David Lim, Tay Khoon Hean, and Oon Jin Gee. That same year, he was drafted into mandatory national service, where he trained at Basic Military Training Centre in Pulau Tekong. Afterwards, he worked as a naval officer, before requesting deferment to participate in the 1988 Summer Olympics, which was granted by the Ministry of Defence. Ang trained in the United States ahead of the Olympics. He had attained the rank of lance-corporal while with the Republic of Singapore Navy.

In April 1988, he participated in the Asian Swimming Championships in Guangzhou, China, where he won Singapore's first gold medal at that competition with a time of 23.12 seconds in the 50 m freestyle. In August, he was awarded the Bintang Bakti Masyarakat. In September, at the Summer Olympics in Seoul, South Korea, Ang participated in the 50 m freestyle. He placed ninth, one spot away from qualifying for the finals, with his time of 23.09 seconds; he placed third in the consolation finals with a time of 23.39 seconds. In an interview with The Straits Times, he stated that he was "disappointed that despite all the hard work, [he] did not qualify for the 50 m freestyle final". At the 1989 SEA Games in Kuala Lumpur, Malaysia, he participated in the 50 m freestyle, 100 m freestyle, 100 m butterfly, 4 × 100 m freestyle, and 4 × 100 medley relays. Ang won gold in the 100 m butterfly and silver in the 100 m freestyle. That same year he participated in the 1989 Pan Pacific Swimming Championships in Tokyo, Japan, in the 50 m freestyle, placing fifth overall.

At the 1990 Asian Games in Beijing, China, he won silver in the 50 m freestyle with a time of 23.30 seconds and bronze in the 4 × 100 m freestyle relay alongside Lim, Kenneth Yeo, and Harold Gan, with a time of 3 minutes 31.46 seconds. At the 1991 SEA Games in Manila, Philippines, he won gold in the 50 m freestyle with a time of 23.89 seconds, along with a silver in the 4 × 100 m freestyle relay with Lim, Yeo, and Gan, and a bronze in the 4 × 100 m medley relay with Lim, Yeo, and Desmond Koh. Ahead of the Games, Shirlynn Ho of The Straits Times wrote that the Singaporean swimming team might not perform well, seeing as their best swimmers, Ang and Lim, were "at the tailend of their careers". Head coach Edmund Lim stated that Ang and Lim would serve more mentor-like roles by supporting the team's newer swimmers.

In 1992, Ang sought sponsorships to fund his swimming training in the United States, ahead of the 1994 Asian Games in Hiroshima, Japan, as he aimed to achieve a gold in the 50 m freestyle. He planned to raise S$75,000 (US$46,416.9) for his training, and he quit his job as a gym and swimming coordinator at the Singapore Island Country Club to focus on it. Sports reporter Hakikat Rai, writing for The Straits Times, opined that his age would prevent him from performing at his peak and achieving this goal, while his fellow swimmers, Steven Cheak, Eadelin Lim, and Gan, disagreed. In 1993, Ang announced his retirement from competitive swimming, stating that "It was time, though there is no right time to retire." The Straits Times reported that several factors led to the decision, including that he had not received appropriate sponsors to raise the money.

=== Post-competitive career ===
In January 1994, Ang joined swimwear business TYR Sport. In September, Ang set up Swimfast Aquatic School with former water polo player David Lim. In 1995, he set up the Aquatic Performance Swim Club and the Ang Peng Siong Swim School; swimmers he trained through the Aquatic Performance Swim Club include Leslie Kwok and Mark Chay. In 1997, he was named the head coach of Singapore's SEA Games swim team, having previously filled the role in 1995. Beginning in 1998, he served as the head coach of the Singapore national swimming team, a position he held until 2012. He was ranked fifth in a public poll of Singapore's best sportspeople of the century held by The Straits Times in 1999. In 2000, he participated in the World Aquatics Masters Championships in Munich, Germany, in the 50 m freestyle and won gold with a time of 24.25 seconds. He additionally won silver in the 50 m butterfly.

In 2001, Ang protested against the SASA's decision to exclude him from the coaches chosen for the 2001 SEA Games in Kuala Lumpur, Malaysia. He stated "how are our swimmers going to reach their optimum levels if they do not even have their personal coaches there with them?", with his protégé swimmer Gary Tan agreeing. SASA administrator Kenneth Chan responded that "there is nothing Ang can do there which the chosen coaches cannot perform". Ang participated in the 2002 World Aquatics Masters Championships in Christchurch, New Zealand, in the 50 m butterfly, the 100 m freestyle, the 50 m freestyle, and the 50 m breaststroke. He achieved gold in the 50 m butterfly with a time of 26.52 seconds, bronze in the 100 m freestyle with a time of 57.42 seconds, gold in the 50 m freestyle, and bronze in the 50 m breaststroke.

In 2004, he quit his role as the managing director of the Aquatic Performance Swim School to focus on coaching the national team with the Singapore Swimming Association (SSA). In 2006, Ang was confirmed to be a part of the Ministry of Community Development, Youth and Sports' Sporting Culture Committee and spoke about improving sports-related education. At the 2007 SEA Games, two of Ang's national records were broken, namely his 100 m freestyle time by Bryan Tay and his time of 56.00 seconds in 100 m butterfly by Tan Xue-wei's time of 55.79 seconds. He stated of the occasion that "It's been a great day," and "the two new national records have made it even better". In 2009, he was appointed the national head coach by the SSA for a four-year term. In 2010, he failed to submit the Singapore men's 4 × 200 m freestyle relay team in time for the 2010 Commonwealth Games, leading to their exclusion in that event. Ang apologised for the oversight, while an SSA chief described his mistake as "trivial".

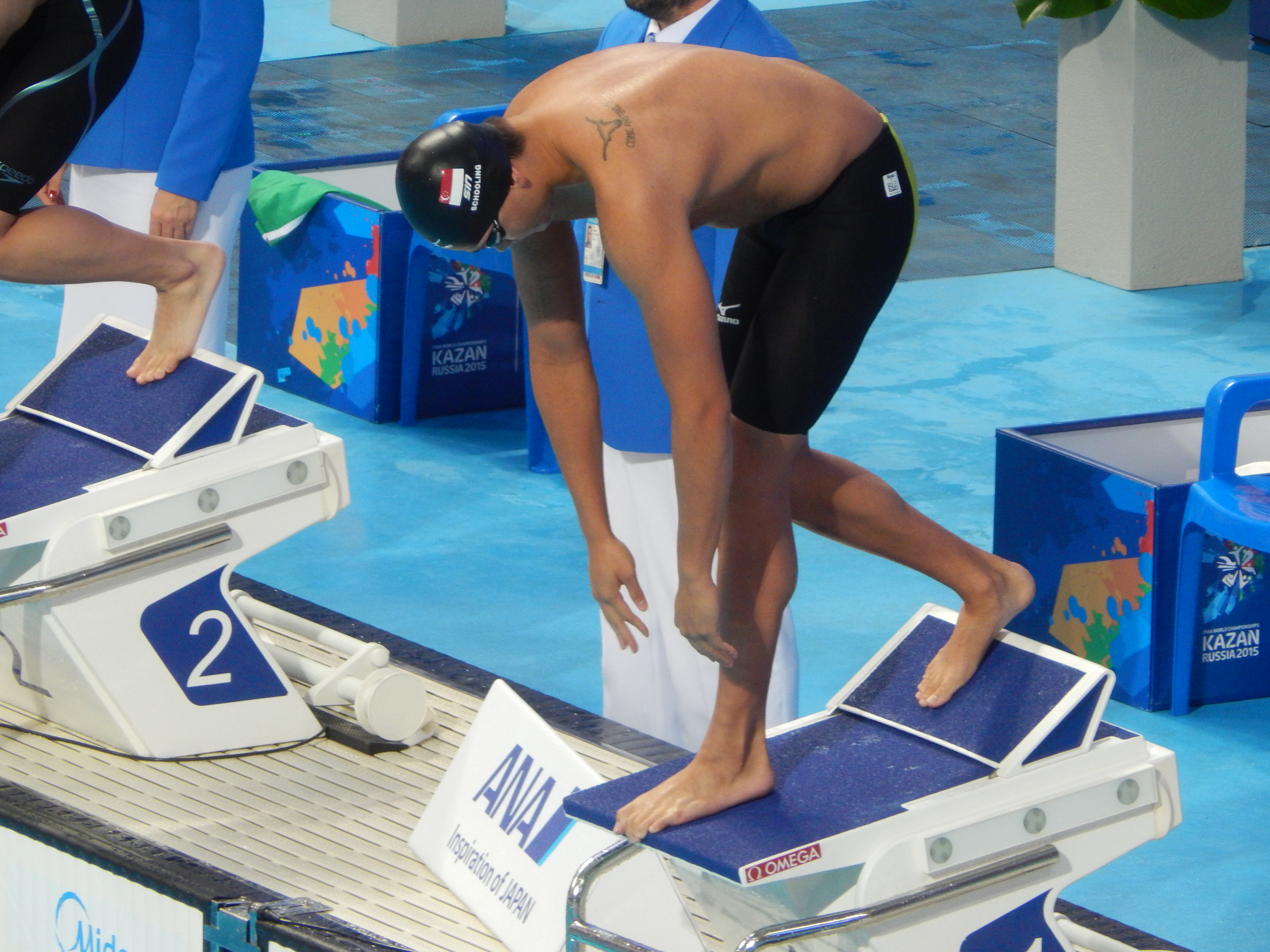
Joseph Schooling (pictured) broke Ang's long-standing national record in the 50 m freestyle.

In 2015, Joseph Schooling broke the 50 m freestyle record at the 2015 SEA Games with a time of 22.47 seconds. Ang stated that Schooling was the "most deserving athlete" to have done so. In 2017, Ang was involved in the foundation of a charity organisation set up by former politician Chiam See Tong. Named the Chiam See Tong Sports Foundation, Ang served as its chairman. It provides financial aid and networking opportunities for athletes. He also appeared in the 2019 short film PS Farrer Park by Ray Pang, a film intended to address the redevelopment of the Farrer Park area. In 2022, after Schooling confessed to cannabis use, Ang spoke about the mental health of athletes. In 2024, he was inducted into the Singapore Aquatics' Hall of Fame for his gold-winning performance at the 1982 Asian Games.

== Personal life ==
In 1989, Ang's family and fiancée were robbed of S$36,000 (1989) (US$18,459.09) in Kuala Lumpur, Malaysia. He married his fiancée, flight stewardess Wendy, the following year. They have one son.

Ang's father, Ang Teck Bee, died on 12 September 2005 of liver cancer. His brother, Ang Peng Wee, is a swimmer, actor, and coach, who was involved in the 2024 Summer Olympics as a swimming technical official.
