= Singapore at the Olympics =

- IOC code: SGP
- NOC: Singapore National Olympic Council
- Website: www.singaporeolympics.com
- Medals Ranked 101st: Gold 1 Silver 2 Bronze 3 Total 6

Summer appearances
- 1948; 1952; 1956; 1960; 1964; 1968; 1972; 1976; 1980; 1984; 1988; 1992; 1996; 2000; 2004; 2008; 2012; 2016; 2020; 2024

Winter appearances
- 2018; 2022; 2026

Other related appearances
- Malaysia (1964)

Singapore has sent athletes to the celebration of the Olympic Games since 1948, when it was established as a separate British crown colony from the Straits Settlements just over three months before the commencement of the 1948 Summer Olympics. (Note: Prior to 1948, ethnic Chinese from Singapore had also competed for China at the Olympics as part of their football team, namely Chua Boon Lay in 1936, and Chia Boon Leong and Chu Chee Seng in 1948.) It continued to send a team to the Games until 1964 when the Singaporean delegation competed with Malaysia, which sent a combined team.

Upon Singapore's full independence from Malaysia in 1965, the country continued to participate in all subsequent editions of the Summer Olympics except in 1980 when the country participated in a large United States–led boycott against the Soviet invasion of Afghanistan. Singapore was the host of the inaugural Summer Youth Olympic Games in 2010.

Singapore made its debut at the Winter Olympic Games in 2018, with speed skater, Cheyenne Goh, competing in the short track speed skating event. The Singapore National Olympic Council (SNOC) is the National Olympic Committee for Singapore.

== Prize ==
Under the Major Games Award Programme by the Singapore National Olympics Council, individual gold, silver and bronze medalists are awarded S$1 million, S$500,000 and S$250,000 respectively. Team event and team sport medalists are awarded different amounts for each medal type.

== Timeline of participation ==
Olympic Year/s	Teams		
1948–1952	Singapore (SIN)		
1956	Singapore (SIN)	Malaya (MAL)	North Borneo
1960	Singapore (SIN)	Malaya (MAL)	
1964	Malaysia (MAL)		
1968–1988	Singapore (SIN)	Malaysia (MAL)	
1992–2016	Singapore (SIN)	Malaysia (MAS)	
2020–present	Singapore (SGP)	Malaysia (MAS)	

== History ==
The country has won six Olympic medals, the first was at the 1960 Summer Olympics, the second at the 2008 Summer Olympics and the third and fourth at the 2012 Summer Olympics. At the 2016 Summer Olympics Singapore won their first ever gold medal and the fifth overall. At the 2024 Summer Olympics, Singapore won their third bronze medal, bringing the total number of Olympic medals won to six.

Singapore's first Olympic medal was won by Tan Howe Liang, who won silver in lightweight weightlifting in 1960 Summer Olympics. The first and to date only Olympic gold medal was won by Joseph Schooling in the men's 100 metre butterfly at the 2016 Summer Olympics. In table tennis, Jing Junhong, Li Jiawei and Yu Mengyu came close to winning medals by finishing in fourth place for the women's singles events at the 2000 Sydney Olympics, 2004 Athens Olympics and 2020 Tokyo Olympics respectively.

The organizers of the 1948 Summer Olympics had sent invitations to numerous countries and colonies but excluded Singapore. The Straits Times, a local newspaper, reported the lack of an invitation on 20 March 1947, through a commentary by its sports editor. It pointed the blame to the colonial government and the sporting community. As a result, the Singapore National Olympic Council was formed and inaugurated on 27 May that same year. Singapore then obtained its invitation to the Olympics.

Singapore sent its first delegation to the Olympics in 1948. A delegation of only one man, fireman Lloyd Valberg, was sent to the 1948 Summer Olympics in London, competing in the high jump. O. T. Bussek served as the attaché for the delegation and Valberg was housed at the Wembley County School along with the delegations of Bermuda, British Guiana, Ceylon, Jamaica, Malta, and Trinidad. Valberg participated in the high jump competition for men. In the qualifying round held on 30 July, Valberg cleared 1.87 metres (6.1 feet), therefore qualifying to the final round. In the final round that same day, Valberg cleared a height of 1.80 m (5.9 ft), getting tied for 14th place with Hércules Azcune of Uruguay.

On 16 September 1963, Singapore, Malaya, North Borneo and Sarawak were merged and Malaysia was formed. In 1964, Singapore competed as part of Malaysia at the 1964 Summer Olympics.

In 1965, Singapore became independent as the "Republic of Singapore" on 9 August 1965. After independence, Singapore competed as an independent country at the Olympics Games.

During the 2008 Beijing Olympics, Singapore sent its largest contingent at that time, since it first participated, and was considered the best prepared to win a medal. Li Jiawei, together with Feng Tianwei and Wang Yuegu, beat the South Korea women's table tennis team, composed of Dang Ye-seo, Kim Kyung-ah and Park Mi-young 3–2 in the semi-finals, assuring Singapore of at least a silver medal and ending Singapore's 48-year Olympic medal drought. Singapore faced host China in the gold medal final and lost in straight sets but won the silver medal.

In the 2012 London Olympics, Feng beat Kasumi Ishikawa from Japan 4–0 in the table tennis women's singles bronze medal match, winning Singapore's first individual Olympic medal in 52 years since Tan won the silver medal at the 1960 Rome Games. In the table tennis women's team bronze medal match, Li, together with Feng and Wang, beat the South Korea team composing Dang Ye-seo, Kim Kyung-ah and Seok Ha-jung 3–0, winning another bronze medal. The two bronze medals won at the 2012 London Summer Olympics marked the first time that Singapore won more than one medal in an Olympiad.

In the 2016 Rio Olympics, Olympic swimmer Joseph Schooling won a gold medal in the Men's 100 metre butterfly in an Olympics record of 50.39 seconds, becoming the first gold Olympic medallist of Singapore. This was also the first gold medal by a Southeast Asian male swimmer and the first Olympic gold that Singapore achieved.

After the Olympics Games, the IOC code for Singapore was changed from SIN to SGP in September 2016.

During the 2020 Summer Olympics held in Tokyo, Japan, Singapore sent 23 athletes to the Games but did not manage to win any medals.

In the 2024 Summer Olympics in Paris, kitefoiler Maximilian Maeder won a bronze medal in the Men’s Kite category at the age of only 17, coming behind second place Toni Vodišek from Slovenia and first place Valentin Bontus from Austria. This makes Maeder the youngest individual to win a medal in the Olympics from Singapore.

Athletes from Singapore have won a total of six medals at the Olympics including one gold.

== Medal tables ==
=== Medals by Summer Games ===
Games	Athletes	Gold	Silver	Bronze	Total	Rank
1948 London	1	0	0	0	0	–
1952 Helsinki	5	0	0	0	0	–
1956 Melbourne	52	0	0	0	0	–
1960 Rome	5	0	1	0	1	32
1964 Tokyo	as part of Malaysia					
1968 Mexico City	4	0	0	0	0	–
1972 Munich	7	0	0	0	0	–
1976 Montreal	4	0	0	0	0	–
1980 Moscow	boycotted					
1984 Los Angeles	5	0	0	0	0	–
1988 Seoul	8	0	0	0	0	–
1992 Barcelona	14	0	0	0	0	–
1996 Atlanta	14	0	0	0	0	–
2000 Sydney	14	0	0	0	0	–
2004 Athens	16	0	0	0	0	–
2008 Beijing	21	0	1	0	1	70
2012 London	23	0	0	2	2	75
2016 Rio de Janeiro	25	1	0	0	1	54
2020 Tokyo	23	0	0	0	0	–
2024 Paris	23	0	0	1	1	84
2028 Los Angeles	future event					
2032 Brisbane	future event					
Total		1	2	3	6	101

=== Medals by Winter Games ===
Games	Athletes	Gold	Silver	Bronze	Total	Rank
2018 Pyeongchang	1	0	0	0	0	–
2022 Beijing	did not participate					
2026 Milano Cortina	1	0	0	0	0	–
2030 French Alps	future event					
2034 Utah	future event					
Total		0	0	0	0	–

=== Medals by summer sport ===
Sport	Gold	Silver	Bronze	Total
Swimming	1	0	0	1
Table tennis	0	1	2	3
Weightlifting	0	1	0	1
Sailing	0	0	1	1
Totals (4 entries)	1	2	3	6

== List of medalists ==
Medal	Name	Games	Sport	Event
Silver	Tan Howe Liang	1960 Rome	Weightlifting	Lightweight
Silver	Feng Tianwei; Li Jiawei; Wang Yuegu	2008 Beijing	Table tennis	Women's team
Bronze	Feng Tianwei	2012 London	Table tennis	Women's singles
Bronze	Feng Tianwei; Li Jiawei; Wang Yuegu	2012 London	Table tennis	Women's team
Gold	Joseph Schooling	2016 Rio de Janeiro	Swimming	Men's 100 m butterfly
Bronze	Max Maeder	2024 Paris	Sailing	Men's Formula Kite

== See also ==
- List of flag bearers for Singapore at the Olympics
- Singapore at the Paralympics
