= David Lim (water polo) =

Singaporean water polo player

Personal information
- Full name: David Lim Tin Kiang
- Nationality: Singaporean
- Born: 6 January 1938 (age 87); Singapore, Straits Settlements

Sport
- Sport: Water polo

David Lim Tin Kiang OLY (born 6 January 1938) is a Singaporean former water polo player. He competed in the men's tournament at the 1956 Summer Olympics.
