= Aye Aye Soe =

Burmese bodybuilder

Aye Aye Soe အေးအေးစိုး
- Professional bodybuilder

Personal info
- Born: 1990; Myanmar

Best statistics

Aye Aye Soe () is a Burmese female top professional bodybuilder.

She is the first female Burmese bodybuilder to win a gold medal in an international competition at Women's Athletic Physique contest held in Singapore’s NUS center. She won the Miss Fitness Physique 2012 and the 12th Southeast Asia Bodybuilding in 2014.

== Biography ==
Aye Aye Soe was born in Myanmar. She graduated with a chemical engineering degree. At 20, she started her passion in bodybuilding.

== Competitive placings ==
- 2012 Miss.Fitness Physique (Winner)
- 2012 Model Physique (1st runner-up)
- 2012 46th Asia Bodybuilding(2nd runner-up)
- 2012 46th Model Physique and Fitness Physique (3rd runner-up)
- 2012 4th World Bodybuilding Physique sports Championship (4th runner-up)
- 2013 Miss.Champion Challenge (Winner)
- 2014 12th Southeast Asia Bodybuilding (Winner)
- 2014 48th Asia Bodybuilding (2nd Runner Up)
