= Oon Jin Teik =

Singaporean swimmer (born 1963)

Personal information
- Nationality: Singaporean
- Born: 27 March 1963 (age 63)

Sport
- Sport: Swimming
Medal record
Representing Singapore
Asian Games
| Bronze medal – third place | 1986 Seoul | 4x200m freestyle relay |
SEA Games
| Gold medal – first place | 1985 Bangkok | 4x100m freestyle relay |
| Gold medal – first place | 1985 Bangkok | 4x200m freestyle relay |
| Gold medal – first place | 1985 Bangkok | 4x100m medley relay |

Oon Jin Teik (born 27 March 1963) is a Singaporean breaststroke and freestyle swimmer. He competed in three events at the 1984 Summer Olympics. His younger brother, Oon Jin Gee, also competed at the Olympics.
