= Oon Jin Gee =

Singaporean swimmer (born 1967)

Personal information
- Nationality: Singaporean
- Born: 13 June 1967 (age 59)

Sport
- Sport: Swimming
Medal record
Representing Singapore
Asian Games
Bronze medal – third place	1986 Seoul	4x100m freestyle relay
Bronze medal – third place	1986 Seoul	4x200m freestyle relay
SEA Games
Gold medal – first place	1985 Bangkok	4x200m freestyle relay
Gold medal – first place	1985 Bangkok	4x100m medley relay
Silver medal – second place	1985 Bangkok	100m freestyle
Silver medal – second place	1985 Bangkok	200m freestyle

Oon Jin Gee (born 13 June 1967) is a retired Singaporean freestyle swimmer. He competed at the 1984 Summer Olympics and the 1988 Summer Olympics. His older brother, Oon Jin Teik, also competed at the Olympics.
