= David Lim (swimmer) =

Singaporean swimmer

Personal information
- Full name: David Lim Fong Jock
- Nationality: Singapore
- Born: 8 September 1966 (age 59) Singapore
- Height: 1.80 m (5 ft 11 in)
- Weight: 75 kg (165 lb) (1988)

Sport
- Sport: Swimming
- Strokes: Backstroke, Medley, Freestyle
- College team: BYU Cougars
Medal record
Men's swimming
Representing Singapore
Asian Games
Bronze medal – third place	1986 Seoul	4×100 m freestyle relay
Bronze medal – third place	1986 Seoul	4×200 m freestyle relay
Bronze medal – third place	1990 Beijing	4×100 m freestyle relay
SEA Games
Silver medal – second place	1981 Manila	200m backstroke
Silver medal – second place	1981 Manila	4x100m freestyle relay
Bronze medal – third place	1981 Manila	100m backstroke
Bronze medal – third place	1981 Manila	4x200m freestyle relay

David Lim Fong Jock, BBM (Chinese: 林方育; pinyin: Lín Fāngyù; born 8 September 1966) is a retired Singaporean swimmer. He won 28 medals, including ten individual and nine relay gold medals, at the Southeast Asian Games from 1981 to 1991. He was part of the Singapore freestyle relay teams that won three bronze medals at the 1986 and 1990 Asian Games. A two-time Olympian, Lim represented Singapore at the 1984 and 1988 Summer Olympics.

Lim is a three-time Singapore National Olympic Council Sportsman of the Year in 1986, 1988 and 1989, and a member of the Men's Swimming 4 × 100 m Freestyle Team of the Year in 1991. He was honoured with the Public Service Star for his contribution to sports by the Singapore government in 1990.

Lim currently coaches the Singapore national swimmers. He is the managing director of Swimfast Aquatic Group, a swimming school he founded in 1995.
