= Singapore National Olympic Council =

National Olympic Committee

- Country: Singapore
- Code: SGP
- Created: 27 May 1947; 78 years ago
- Recognized: 1948
- Continental Association: OCA
- President: Grace Fu
- Secretary General: Mark Chay
- Website: www.singaporeolympics.com

The Singapore National Olympic Council (SNOC) is the National Olympic Committee for the Republic of Singapore. It was founded in 1947 as the Singapore Olympic and Sports Council (SOSC) before renaming to its current iteration in 1970.

The SNOC is responsible for supporting, entering and overseeing Team Singapore for the Olympic Games, Youth Olympic Games, Winter Olympic Games, Winter Youth Olympic Games, SEA Games, Asian Games, Asian Youth Games and the Commonwealth Games.

The SNOC is currently headed by Grace Fu, who was elected on 5 January 2024 following the resignation of former President Tan Chuan Jin.

== History ==
Before the 1948 Summer Olympics organised by Britain, Britain sent out invitations to its colonies and dependencies to participate in the Games. However, due to a lack of an Olympic Council, Singapore, despite being a Crown Colony, was omitted. This led to the formation of the Singapore Olympic and Sports Council on 27 May 1947. It was planned that the Council would merge with a similar Olympic Council of Malaya.

Singapore Olympic and Sports Council became an affiliate of the International Olympic Committee (IOC) in 1948. That same year, Singapore sent its first two-men team to the Olympics in London. Lloyd Valberg became the first Singaporean to participate in the Olympic Games. He was accompanied by a manager, Jocelyn de Souza.

Singapore has since participated at other international and regional games which included the 1951 inaugural Asian Games, the Commonwealth Games at Cardiff, Wales in 1958 and the inaugural South East Asian Peninsular Games (which was renamed as Southeast Asian Games later) in 1959. Since then, Singapore has been a regular participant in these games.

In 1970, Singapore Olympic and Sports Council was renamed as Singapore National Olympic Council.

The IOC code for Singapore was changed from SIN to SGP in September 2016, and is first used in Danang 2016, Asian Beach Games.

== Singapore Sports Awards ==
In 1968, the SNOC introduced the Singapore Sports Awards to recognise athletes who made significant achievements. It includes awards such as Sportsman and Sportswoman of the Year, as well as Team of the Year and Coach of the Year. The awards cover a wide variety of categories, and also honour other parts of the fraternity apart from athletes and officials.

A new award category, Best Sports Photo of the Year, was also introduced in 2017.

== List of presidents ==
- H. P. Bryson (1947–1948)
- Andrew Gilmour (1948–1951)
- Tan Chye Cheng (1951–1962)
- A. T. Rajah (1962–1966)
- Othman Wok (1966–1970)
- E. W. Barker (1970–1990)
- Yeo Ning Hong (1990–1998)
- Teo Chee Hean (1998–2014)
- Tan Chuan-Jin (2014–2023)
- Jessie Phua (acting) (2023–2024)
- Grace Fu (2024–present)

== See also ==
- Singapore at the Olympics
- Singapore at the Commonwealth Games
- Sport in Singapore
- List of Singapore world champions in sports
