= 2025 in Colombia =

- Decades: 2000s; 2010s; 2020s
- See also: Other events of 2025; Timeline of Colombian history

Events of the year 2025 in Colombia.

== Incumbents ==
- President: Gustavo Petro (2022–2026).
- Vice President: Francia Márquez (2022–2026).

== Events ==
=== Ongoing ===
- Colombian conflict
  - Catatumbo campaign
  - United Nations Verification Mission in Colombia

=== January ===
- 1 January – The minimum wage in Colombia is raised from 1.3 million to 1.4 million Colombian pesos per month, a 9.54% rise.
- 3 January – Thirteen people die and 28 are injured after a bus carrying 42 people falls into a gorge while traveling on a road connecting Ipiales with Pasto in Nariño Department.
- 8 January – A Cessna 402 operated by Pacifica de Aviación (registered as HK-2522) crashes in Antioquia Department, killing all 10 occupants on board.
- 10 January – Venezuela closes its border with Colombia ahead of President Nicolás Maduro's third inauguration.
- 17 January – 2025 Catatumbo clashes: The government suspends peace talks with the National Liberation Army (ELN) following separate clashes between the group and dissident Revolutionary Armed Forces of Colombia (FARC) members in Norte de Santander Department and the Clan del Golfo in Bolívar Department that leaves at least 39 people dead.
- 21 January:
  - 2025 Catatumbo clashes:
    - The death toll of the ELN attacks in northeastern Colombia rises to at least 80 people, with thousands more displaced.
    - The government officially declares a state of internal commotion and launches a military offensive against ELN guerillas. The National Police begin evacuating people from affected areas.
    - Fourteen FARC dissidents from the 33rd front surrender to the National Army to avoid attacks by the ELN in El Tarra and Tibú municipalities of Norte de Santander.
- 22 January:
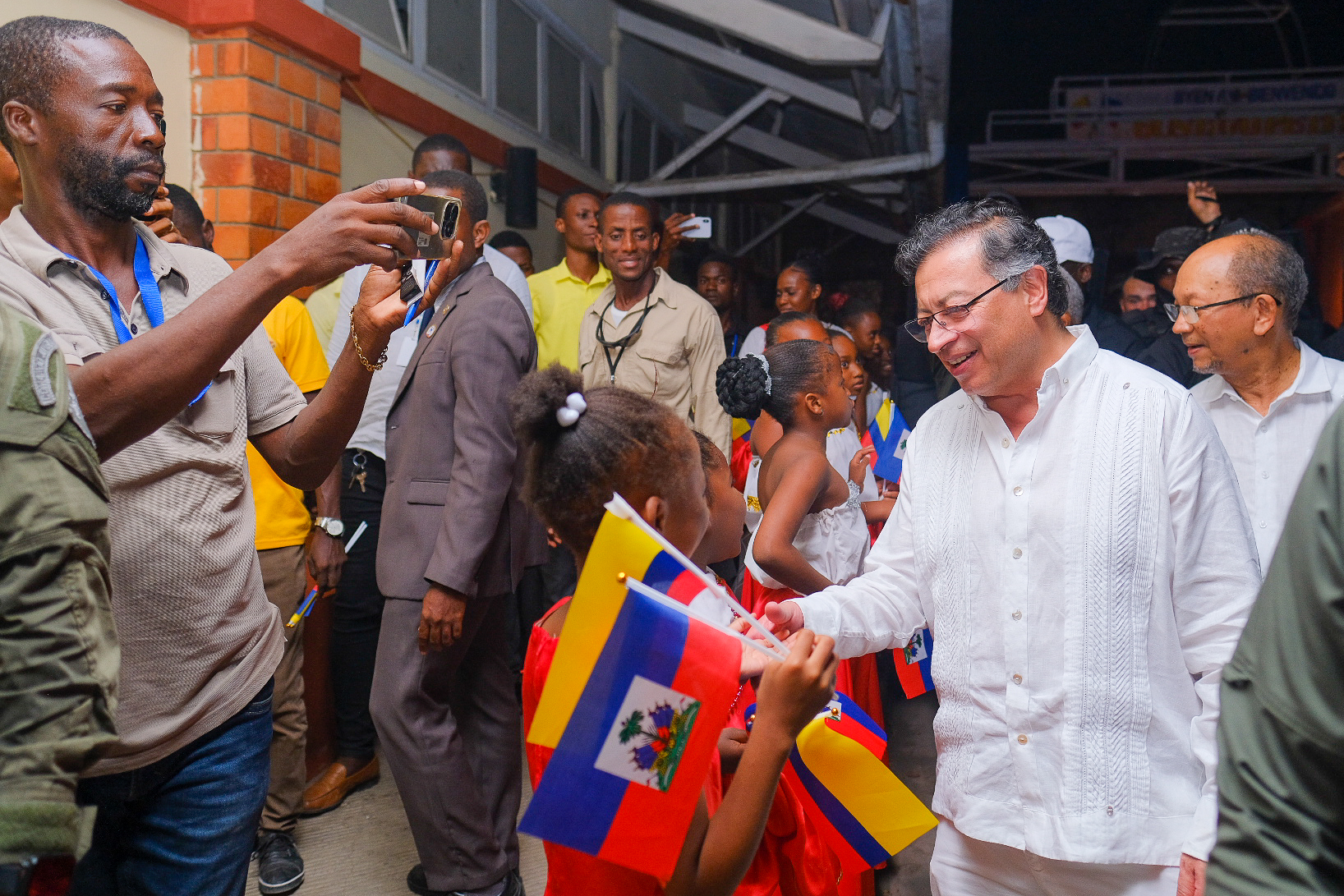
  President of Colombia Gustavo Petro visiting Haiti (22 January 2025)
  - 2025 Catatumbo clashes: The Attorney General reactivates arrest warrants for 31 ELN leaders, including some who had represented the ELN during peace talks.
  - President Petro travels to Haiti in an official state visit and meets with members of the transitional government.
- 24 January – 2025 Catatumbo clashes: President Petro issues a decree giving himself emergency powers to restore order in the Catatumbo region for a period of 270 days.
- 25 January – 2025 Catatumbo clashes: Eighty-four ELN combatants surrender to authorities and 20 child soldiers are rescued from the ELN's 33rd Front. Fifty-five rifles, five machine guns, a sniper rifle, 25 pistols, 80 mortar shells, explosives, 300 anti-personnel mines, 20,327 rounds of ammunition and communications equipment are also seized.
- 26 January – US President Donald Trump threatens to impose sanctions, tariffs, a travel ban, and visa revocations against Colombia as retaliation for not accepting two U.S. military deportation flights. President Petro says that the country will not accept any deportation flights until the United States creates a process that treats the migrants with "dignity and respect," and that civilian aircraft flights would be accepted. Later in the day, the White House announces that Colombia had agreed to accept deportees.
- 29 January –The first leg of the 2025 Superliga Colombiana is held at Estadio Atanasio Girardot in Medellín.

=== February ===
- 4 February – President Petro orders the cancellation of a joint petroleum production venture between the state oil company Ecopetrol and the US firm Occidental Petroleum, citing concerns over the usage of fracking.
- 6 February –The second leg of the 2025 Superliga Colombiana is held at Estadio Américo Montanini in Bucaramanga. Atlético Nacional wins 4–3 on penalties, winning their fourth title.
- 9 February – President Petro asks his entire cabinet to resign amid an ongoing internal dispute.
- 18 February – The ELN launches a three-day "armed strike" in Chocó Department.
- 20 February – A police officer is injured in a bomb attack on a police station in Cúcuta.

=== March ===
- 6 March – Twenty-eight soldiers and a police officer are abducted in an attack by FARC dissidents in El Plateado, Cauca Department. They are released on 8 March.
- 11 March – Five soldiers are killed in a roadside bombing of their vehicle by FARC dissidents in the Micay Canyon, Cauca Department.
- 20 March – Match 63 of the 2026 FIFA World Cup qualifications is played between Brazil and Colombia at Estádio Nacional Mané Garrincha in Brasília, Brazil. Brazil wins 2-1 in a last minute goal.
- 25 March – Match 66 of the 2026 FIFA World Cup qualifications is played between Colombia and Paraguay at the Estadio Metropolitano Roberto Meléndez in Barranquilla.
- 25–27 March – The World Health Organization's (WHO) Second Global Conference on Air Pollution and Health is held in Cartagena.
- 28 March:
  - Former Medellín Cartel leader Carlos Lehder is arrested upon arrival at El Dorado International Airport in Bogotá from Germany. He is released on 31 March after a court rules that his 24-year prison sentence for drug trafficking in Colombia had expired in 2019.
  - Deportation in the second presidency of Donald Trump: Felipe Zapata Velázquez, a Colombian student studying in the United States on an F-1 visa at the University of Florida, is pulled over in a traffic stop for alleged traffic violations and deported back to Colombia.

=== April ===
- 1–6 April – The 64th annual Cartagena Film Festival is held.
- 5 April:
  - The Comuneros del Sur, an ELN splinter group, signs a peace agreement with the government.
  - Sara Millerey González, a 32 year old trans woman, dies after being assaulted, raped, and thrown into a stream near Bello, Antioquia. Her assault and death spark protests and vigils in Bello as well as Barranquilla, Bogotá, Cali, and Medellín.
- 6 April – The dismembered remains of Italian biologist Alessandro Coatti are found in multiple locations in the Santa Marta area.
- 12 April – Authorities in Bogotá lift a water-rationing scheme that had been implemented in the city since 2024 due to drought.
- 29 April – A Bell 412EP helicopter of the Colombian Navy crashes into a lake near Mahates, Bolívar Department, killing one of the four occupants on board.

=== May ===
- 10 May – President Petro grants asylum to former Panamanian president Ricardo Martinelli, who had been taking refuge in the Nicaraguan embassy in Panama City following a conviction for money laundering in 2023.
- 14 May:
  - Colombia officially joins China's Belt and Road Initiative with the signing of an agreement in Beijing.
  - The Senate votes down a proposal by President Petro to hold a referendum on labor reforms.
- 15 May:
  - The Peruvian Ministry of the Interior announces that a suspect in the kidnapping and murder of 13 gold miners in Pataz province has been arrested in Colombia.
  - Model and influencer María José Estupiñán Sánchez is shot dead outside her home in Cúcuta, Santander Department.
- 25 May – A bus carrying students and professors from Humboldt University in Armenia crashes on the Helicoidal Bridge in Calarcá, killing ten people and injuring eleven others.
- 26 May:
  - A pipeline supplying gas to Boyacá Department is damaged, affecting 15 municipalities.
  - The Council of State publishes its opinion rejecting The Coca-Cola Company's resquest for trademark protection of its "Agua Brisa" brand against Alvisa Alcohol Group, allowing Alvisa to trademark "La Brisa Alvisa" for its product.
- 28 May – A two-day strike is launched to demand a referendum on President Petro's proposed labor reforms which failed in Congress.

=== June ===
- 2 June – A Guatemalan appeals court acting on a request by the office of the Attorney General of Guatemala orders the arrest of attorney-general Luz Adriana Camargo and defense minister Iván Velásquez Gómez over their role in the International Commission against Impunity in Guatemala.
- 3 June – Colombia is elected to a rotating seat at the United Nations Security Council.
- June –2026 FIFA World Cup qualifications: Colombia v. Peru at the Estadio Metropolitano Roberto Meléndez in Barranquilla.
- 7 June –
  - 2026 presidential election pre-candidate and senator Miguel Uribe Turbay is shot at a campaign event in Bogotá. He dies of his injuries on 11 August.
  - Four people are killed in a rafting accident along the Güegar River in Meta Department.
- 8 June – A magnitude 6.3 earthquake hits Cundinamarca Department, injuring six people.
- 10 June –
  - Seven people are killed in a series of bomb and gun attacks on police stations blamed on the FARC-EMC across Cauca and Valle del Cauca Departments, including in Cali.
  - Match 80 of the 2026 FIFA World Cup qualifications is held between Argentina and Colombia in Buenos Aires, Argentina, ending with a 1 – 1 draw.
- 12 June – President Petro bypasses Congress and issues a decree to hold a referendum on labor reforms in August 2025.
- 21–22 June – Fifty-seven soldiers are abducted by residents in the Micay Canyon in Cauca Department. The soldiers are released following a military operation on 24 June.
- 25 June –
  - At least 22 people are killed and eight others are reported missing following a landslide in Medellín and Bello in Antioquia Department.
  - President Petro signs into law the contested labor reform laws.
- 26 June –
  - The Constitutional Court of Colombia stops an investigation by the National Electoral Council into allegations of illicit campaign financing by labor unions and unreported spending by President Petro during his 2022 electoral campaign. It orders the council to refer the case to the Chamber of Representatives, ruling it is the body with the authority to investigate the matter.
  - President Petro suspends the extradition of FARC-EMC commander Willington Henao Gutiérrez, also known as "Mocho Olmedo", to the United States to face drug trafficking charges, citing his importance in peace negotiations with rebels in the Catatumbo region.

=== July ===
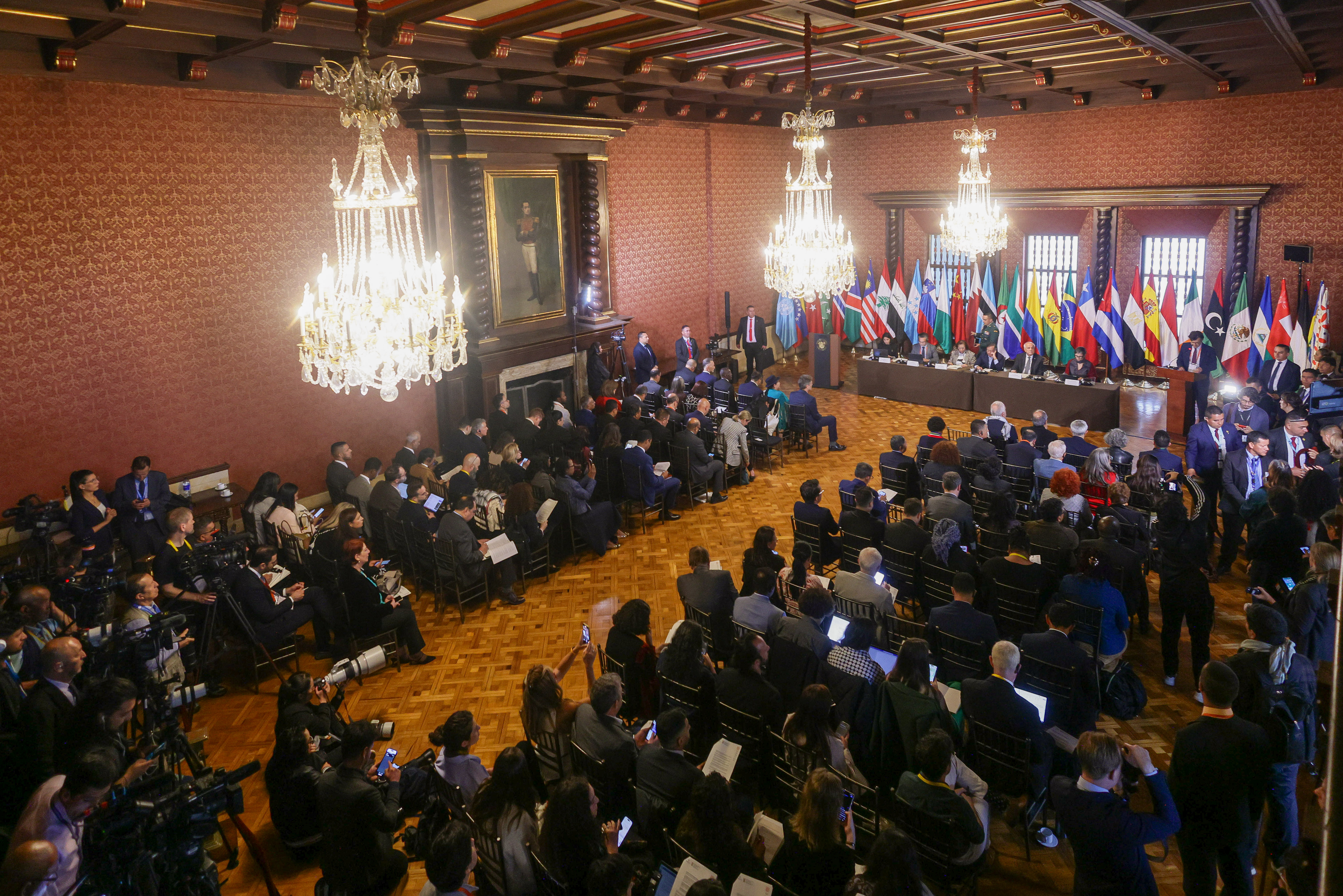
- The emergency conference on Palestine, convened by the Hague Group in Bogotá (16 July).
  3 July – The United States recalls its charge d’affaires to Colombia in response to criticism by President Petro over Washington's position over an alleged plot to overthrow him.
- 9 July – A soldier is killed in a bomb attack on an army patrol blamed on the ELN near Valdivia, Antioquia.
- 11 July – Giuseppe Palermo, a suspected leader of the Italian 'Ndrangheta, is arrested in Bogotá following an Interpol red notice against him.
- 15–16 July – Bogotá hosts an emergency conference of the Hague Group amid the Gaza genocide, attended by representatives of 32 countries.
- 18 July – Eighteen miners are rescued from a collapsed gold mine in Remedios, Antioquia.
- 20 July – Three soldiers are killed in a drone attack on a military patrol blamed on the ELN in El Carmen, Norte de Santander.
- 23 July – The 6th Criminal Court of the Specialized Circuit of Antioquia sentences seven former Chiquita executives to 135 months in prison and fines them COP$13.876 billion (US$3.4 million) for financing the now-defunct United Self-Defense Forces of Colombia paramilitary in Urabá Antioquia.
- 26 July – Ecuador deports 600 Colombian detainees through the Rumichaca Bridge, prompting criticism from the Colombian government accusing its counterparts of failing to coordinate the transfer.
- 28 July – Former president Alvaro Uribe is convicted of witness tampering and bribery involving a case about Uribe's alleged links with paramilitary groups. He is sentenced on 1 August to 12 years' home confinement, but has his conviction overturned on appeal on 21 October.

=== August ===
- 5 August – President Petro accuses Peru of fully annexing the disputed island of Santa Rosa along their common border in the Amazon River.
- 12 August – Three soldiers are killed in drone attack on a military checkpoint blamed on dissident FARC rebels along the Naya River.
- 21 August –
  - At least five people are killed in a vehicle bombing near a military aviation school in Cali.
  - A helicopter carrying police officers is shot down in a drone attack in Antioquia Department, killing 12 officers.
- 24 August – Thirty-three soldiers are abducted by villagers near El Retorno in Guaviare Department following clashes that left 10 FARC dissidents dead. They are released on 28 August.
- 27 August – The teenage gunman accused of killing Miguel Uribe Turbay in June is sentenced to a seven-year confinement at a youth rehabilitation facility.

=== September ===
- 3 September – FIFA issues a CHF70,000 ($87,000)-fine on the Colombian Football Federation over racist behavior by fans during a 2026 FIFA World Cup qualification match between the national team and Peru in June.
- 4 September –
  - The Constitutional Court of Colombia upholds a 2024 law banning bullfighting nationwide, and separately issues a nationwide ban on cockfighting.
  - Colombia qualifies for the 2026 FIFA World Cup after defeating Bolivia 3-0 at the 2026 FIFA World Cup qualification.
- 7 September –
  - Forty-five soldiers are abducted during an anti-narcotics operation in the Micay Canyon, Cauca Department. They are released the next day.
  - A magnitude 5.1 earthquake hits Antioquia Department, killing one person and destroying several houses.
- 9 September – 2026 FIFA World Cup qualifications: Colombia v. Bolivia at the Estadio Metropolitano Roberto Meléndez in Barranquilla.
- 12 September – The Constitutional Court rules that Meta Platforms had unlawfully deleted the Instagram account of adult actress Esperanza Gómez and inconsistently applied its policies against nudity and sexual services.
- 14 September –
  - A police officer is killed in an attack by FARC dissidents on a police station in Carmelo, Cauca Department.
  - 14 September –2026 FIFA World Cup qualifications: Venezuela v. Colombia.
- 15 September –
  - The United States decertifies Colombia as a cooperative partner in the war on drugs for the first time since 1997.
  - President Petro accuses the United States of killing a Colombian fisherman in a strike by the US military on his boat during anti-drug operations off the Caribbean coast of Colombia.
- 16 September –
  - The Special Jurisdiction for Peace convicts seven former FARC leaders for the kidnapping of 21,000 people during the Colombian conflict and sentences them to eight years of rehabilitation and reparations work.
  - The government suspends the purchase of weapons from the United States in response to the US decision to decertify Colombia in its drug control obligations.
- 18 September – The Special Jurisdiction for Peace orders 12 former officers of the Colombian military to do eight years of rehabilitation and reparations work for their role in the killings of 135 civilians falsely accused of being rebels during the Colombian conflict.
- 20 September – The bodies of seven miners are recovered from a collapsed illegal gold mine in Cauca Department.
- 22 September – The La Reliquia mine in Segovia, Antioquia, collapses, trapping 23 people who are rescued on 24 September.
- 25 September – At least 11 people are reported to have died after consuming bootleg alcohol in Barranquilla.
- 26 September – The United States revokes president Petro's visa after he publicly calls for US soldiers to disobey president Donald Trump during a pro-Palestine rally in New York City on the sidelines of his attendance at the Eightieth session of the United Nations General Assembly.
- 27 September – American musician Kendrick Lamar performs for the first time in Colombia following a concert at the Foro Vive Claro in Bogotá as part of his Grand National Tour.

=== October ===
- 13 October – Two exiled Venezuelan human rights activists are injured in a targeted shooting in Bogotá.
- 17 October – The United States announces that it had killed three people in a strike on a drug-smuggling boat used by the ELN off the Caribbean coast of Colombia.
- 20 October – Colombia recalls its ambassador to the United States, Daniel García-Peña, following disparaging comments made by US president Donald Trump against President Petro.
- 24 October – The United States imposes sanctions on President Petro, his family, and interior minister Armando Benedetti on charges of involvement in drug-trafficking.

=== November ===
- 9–10 November – The 4th CELAC-EU summit is held in Santa Marta.
- 11 November – The governor of Arauca Department, Renson Martínez, survives an ambush on his vehicle while traveling between Tame and Fortul.
- 12 November – The military carries out an airstrike on a suspected FARC dissidents camp in Guaviare Department, killing 19 people.
- 14 November – Nine guerillas are killed in a military airstrike in Arauca Department.
- 17 November – President Petro orders the Financial Information and Analysis Unit to release his bank records to the public.
- 21 November – Police seize 14 tonnes of cocaine valued at more than $388.9 million from a warehouse in Buenaventura, Valle del Cauca.
- 23 November – Colombia Migration rescues 17 minors from the Lev Tahor sect following a raid on a hotel in Yarumal.
- 25 November — Santiago Uribe, the brother of former president Alvaro Uribe, is sentenced to 28 years' imprisonment for murder and aggravated conspiracy over his support of The 12 Apostles paramilitary group during the 1990s.
- 27 November –
  - Catalina Duque is crowned Miss International 2025 in Japan.
  - An army general and an official of the National Intelligence Directorate are suspended amid allegations that they had shared sensitive information with a FARC dissident commander.

=== December ===
- 1 December – Colombia expels 26 members of the Lev Tahor sect to the United States amid an investigation into the group's involvement in child abuse.
- 7 December – Two police officers are killed in a bomb attack blamed on the ELN in Cúcuta.
- 9 December – The United States imposes sanctions on several individuals and entities linked to a transnational network that recruited former Colombian soldiers to work as mercenaries for the Rapid Support Forces during the Sudanese civil war.
- 14 December
  - The ELN imposes a three-day armed strike over Bogotá, Medellín, Cali, Popayán and Barrancabermeja in response to proposed military offensives against the group.
  - A school bus carrying students returning from a field trip falls off a cliff in Remedios, Antioquia, killing 17 people and injuring 20 others.
- 16 December – Two police offices are killed in a bomb attack carried out by the ELN in Cali.
- 17 December – The United States designates the Clan del Golfo as a foreign terrorist organization.
- 18 December – Seven soldiers are killed in an ELN attack on their outpost in Aguachica, Cesar Department.
- 22 December – President Petro declares an economic state of emergency allowing his government to issue taxes by decree.

== Arts and entertainment ==
- List of 2025 box office number-one films in Colombia

== Deaths ==
=== January ===
- 1 January – Bayardo Ardila, 55, actor and voice actor (b. 1969).
- 4 January:
  - Elver Cerón, politician and mayor of Mocoa (2004–2007, 2012–2015), shot.
  - Víctor Manuel Zapata, 39, footballer (b. 1985).
- 5 January:
  - María Páramo, 61, paleontologist and geologist (b. 1963).
  - Orlando Cabrales Martínez, 85, politician and chemical engineer (b. 1939).
- 8 January – Jorge Cáceres, 77, Argentine-born footballer.
- 9 January – Manuel Elkin Patarroyo, 78, immunologist, pathologist, and academic (b. 1946).
- 10 January – Nelson Silva Pacheco, 80, Uruguayan-born footballer (b. 1944).
- 11 January – Vanessa "Galena" Ochoa, 33, radio journalist (found).
- 14 January – Rubén Ardila, 82, psychologist.
- 16 January – Miguel de la Espriella, 77, painter and sculptor (b. 1947).

=== February ===
- 2 February – Gabriel Melo Guevara, 85, judge and politician, associate justice of the supreme court (1972–1978), senator (1991–1994) (b. 1939).
- 10 February – Fabio de Jesús Morales Grisales, 90, Roman Catholic prelate and bishop (b. 1934).

=== March ===
- 28 March – Armando Osma, 63, football player (Deportivo Cali, Deportes Tolima) and manager (Manta), heart attack.

=== April ===
- 6 April:
  - Alessandro Coatti, Italian biologist (found).
  - Jorge Bolaño, 47, footballer (Atlético Junior, Parma, national team), heart attack.
- 9 April – Abel Rodríguez, artist and plant expert.

=== May ===
- 22 May – Carmenza Duque, singer (b. 1951)

=== June ===
- 30 June – Nydia Quintero Turbay, First Lady of Colombia (1978–1982) (b. 1932)

=== August ===
- 8 August – Eugenio Baena Calvo, 71, journalist.
- 11 August – Miguel Uribe Turbay, senator (since 2022) (b. 1986)
- 12 August – Nel Beltrán Santamaría, 83, Roman Catholic prelate, bishop of Sincelejo (1992–2014).
- 19 August – Ney López, 95, Olympic weightlifter (1956, 1960).

=== September ===
- 11 September – Libardo Ramírez Gómez, 91, Roman Catholic prelate, bishop of Armenia (1972–1986) and of Garzón (1986–2003).
- 25 September – Jacques Mosseri, 89, architect.

=== October ===
- 10 October – Carlos Barbosa, 81, actor (La saga, negocio de familia, Holy Expectations, Bermúdez).
- 16 October – Gustavo Angarita, 83, actor (The Strategy of the Snail, The 33, Memories of My Father).

=== November ===
- 15 November – Víctor Delgado Mallarino, 96, police officer, director general of the National Police (1983–1986).
