= Weightlifting at the 1956 Summer Olympics – Men's 67.5 kg =

Weightlifting at the Olympics

Men's 67.5 kg at the Games of the XVI Olympiad
- Venue: Royal Exhibition Building
- Date: 24 November 1956
- Competitors: 18 from 17 nations
- Winning total: 380 kg OR

Medalists
1st place, gold medalist(s)		Ihor Rybak	Soviet Union
2nd place, silver medalist(s)		Ravil Khabutdinov	Soviet Union
3rd place, bronze medalist(s)		Kim Chang-hee	South Korea

The men's 67.5 kg weightlifting competitions at the 1956 Summer Olympics in Melbourne took place on 24 November at the Royal Exhibition Building. It was the eighth appearance of the lightweight class.

== Competition format ==
Each weightlifter had three attempts at each of the three lifts. The best score for each lift was summed to give a total. The weightlifter could increase the weight between attempts (minimum of 5 kg between first and second attempts, 2.5 kg between second and third attempts) but could not decrease weight. If two or more weightlifters finished with the same total, the competitors' body weights were used as the tie-breaker (lighter athlete wins).

== Records ==
Prior to this competition, the existing world and Olympic records were as follows.

World record	Press	Ravil Khabutdinov (URS)	123 kg		1956
World record	Snatch	Nikolay Kostylev (URS)	125 kg		1956
World record	Clean & Jerk	Ibrahim Shams (EGY)	153.5 kg		1939
World record	Total	Nikolay Kostylev (URS)	382.5 kg	Munich, West Germany	13 October 1955
Olympic record	Press	John Stuart (CAN)	107.5 kg	London, United Kingdom	10 August 1948
Olympic record	Snatch	Tommy Kono (USA)	117.5 kg	Helsinki, Finland	26 July 1952
Olympic record	Clean & Jerk	Ibrahim Shams (EGY)	147.5 kg	London, United Kingdom	10 August 1948
Olympic record	Total	Tommy Kono (USA)	362.5 kg	Helsinki, Finland	26 July 1952

== Results ==
Rank	Athlete	Nation	Body weight	Press (kg)				Snatch (kg)				Clean & Jerk (kg)				Total
Rank	Athlete	Nation	Body weight	1	2	3	Result	1	2	3	Result	1	2	3	Result	Total
1st place, gold medalist(s)	Ihor Rybak	Soviet Union	67.20	110	~~115~~	~~115~~	110	112.5	117.5	120	120 OR	142.5	147.5	150	150 OR	380 OR
2nd place, silver medalist(s)	Ravil Khabutdinov	Soviet Union	67.40	117.5	122.5	125	125 WR	105	110	~~112.5~~	110	137.5	~~142.5~~	~~142.5~~	137.5	372.5
3rd place, bronze medalist(s)	Kim Chang-hee	South Korea	67.20	100	105	107.5	107.5	107.5	112.5	~~115~~	112.5	140	145	150	150 OR	370
4	Kenji Onuma	Japan	66.50	105	105	110	110	105	~~110~~	110	110	142.5	147.5	~~152.5~~	147.5	367.5
5	Henrik Tamraz	Iran	67.20	110	115	~~117.5~~	115	105	~~110~~	~~110~~	105	~~140~~	145	~~150~~	145	365
6	Jan Czepułkowski	Poland	67.30	115	120	~~122.5~~	120	105	~~110~~	~~110~~	105	130	135	~~137.5~~	135	360
7	Ivan Abadjiev	Bulgaria	67.10	102.5	~~107.5~~	~~107.5~~	102.5	110	115	117.5	117.5	132.5	~~137.5~~	137.5	137.5	357.5
8	Nil Tun Maung	Burma	66.40	110	~~115~~	~~115~~	110	~~100~~	100	105	105	137.5	~~142.5~~	~~142.5~~	137.5	352.5
9	Tiger Tan	Singapore	65.20	~~107.5~~	107.5	~~110~~	107.5	100	~~107.5~~	~~107.5~~	100	135	140	142.5	142.5	350
10	Josef Tauchner	Austria	67.10	~~105~~	105	~~110~~	105	100	~~107.5~~	107.5	107.5	135	~~140~~	~~140~~	135	347.5
11	Vern Barberis	Australia	67.50	100	105	~~107.5~~	105	100	105	~~110~~	105	132.5	137.5	~~142.5~~	137.5	347.5
12	Willi Kolb	United Team of Germany	66.80	110	~~115~~	~~115~~	110	95	100	~~105~~	100	125	130	~~135~~	130	340
13	Ben Helfgott	Great Britain	67.20	105	110	112.5	112.5	95	100	~~105~~	100	127.5	~~132.5~~	~~132.5~~	127.5	340
14	Américo Ferreira	Brazil	66.80	102.5	~~107.5~~	~~107.5~~	102.5	92.5	97.5	~~100~~	97.5	130	~~135~~	135	135	335
15	Roger Gerber	France	67.50	97.5	102.5	105	105	95	100	~~102.5~~	100	125	~~130~~	130	130	335
16	Luciano De Genova	Italy	66.20	107.5	~~112.5~~	~~112.5~~	107.5	95	~~100~~	100	100	~~122.5~~	122.5	~~130~~	122.5	330
17	Guillermo Balboa	Mexico	67.00	92.5	~~97.5~~	~~97.5~~	92.5	92.5	97.5	100	100	127.5	~~132.5~~	~~132.5~~	127.5	320
18	Ney López	Colombia	65.70	~~105~~	~~105~~	~~105~~	–	95	100	~~102.5~~	100	122.5	~~127.5~~	~~127.5~~	122.5	222.5

== New records ==
Press	125 kg	Ravil Khabutdinov (URS)	WR
Snatch	120 kg	Ihor Rybak (URS)	OR
Clean & Jerk	150 kg	Ihor Rybak (URS); Kim Chang-hee (KOR)	OR
Total	380 kg	Ihor Rybak (URS)	OR
