= Weightlifting at the 1958 Asian Games – Men's 67.5 kg =

Men's 67.5 kg at the 1958 Asian Games
- Venue: National Stadium Gymnasium
- Date: 26 May 1958
- Competitors: 9 from 9 nations

Medalists
gold medal	Tan Howe Liang	Singapore
silver medal	Kenji Onuma	Japan
bronze medal	Henrik Tamraz	Iran

The men's lightweight (67.5 kilograms) event at the 1958 Asian Games took place on 26 May 1958 at the National Stadium Gymnasium in Tokyo, Japan.

Each weightlifter performed in clean and press, snatch and clean and jerk lifts, with the final score being the sum of the lifter's best result in each. The weightlifter received three attempts in each of the three lifts; the score for the lift was the heaviest weight successfully lifted.

Tan Howe Liang of Singapore won the gold medal.

== Schedule ==
All times are Japan Standard Time (UTC+09:00)

Date	Time	Event
Monday, 26 May 1958	15:00	Final

== Results ==
Rank	Athlete	Body weight	Press (kg)				Snatch (kg)				Jerk (kg)				Total
Rank	Athlete	Body weight	1	2	3	Result	1	2	3	Result	1	2	3	Result	Total
1st place, gold medalist(s)	Tan Howe Liang (SIN)	66.2	~~110.0~~	~~110.0~~	110.0	110.0	105.0	110.0	112.5	112.5	145.0	152.5	~~157.5~~	152.5	375.0
2nd place, silver medalist(s)	Kenji Onuma (JPN)	67.3	110.0	115.0	~~117.5~~	115.0	110.0	~~115.0~~	~~115.0~~	110.0	145.0	150.0	~~155.0~~	150.0	375.0
3rd place, bronze medalist(s)	Henrik Tamraz (IRN)	67.0	105.0	110.0	112.5	112.5	107.5	~~112.5~~	112.5	112.5	140.0	~~145.0~~	145.0	145.0	370.0
4	Nil Tun Maung (BIR)	66.8	115.0	120.0	~~122.5~~	120.0	100.0	105.0	~~110.0~~	105.0	~~140.0~~	140.0	~~147.5~~	140.0	365.0
5	Chin Oh-hyon (KOR)	66.7	105.0	~~110.0~~	~~110.0~~	105.0	~~100.0~~	100.0	105.0	105.0	~~140.0~~	145.0	~~150.0~~	145.0	355.0
6	Yap Meng Shong (MAL)	66.6	100.0	~~105.0~~	~~105.0~~	100.0	97.5	~~102.5~~	102.5	102.5	117.5	122.5	~~127.5~~	122.5	325.0
7	Sou Liam-lee (ROC)	64.5	87.5	92.5	~~95.0~~	92.5	87.5	92.5	~~95.0~~	92.5	127.5	~~135.0~~	~~140.0~~	127.5	312.5
8	Abdul Ghani Butt (PAK)	66.7	80.0	85.0	~~87.5~~	85.0	87.5	92.5	~~95.0~~	92.5	115.0	120.0	122.5	122.5	300.0
9	Cresenciano Cabanlit (PHI)	65.8	85.0	~~90.0~~	~~90.0~~	85.0	87.5	~~92.5~~	~~92.5~~	87.5	~~120.0~~	120.0	~~127.5~~	120.0	292.5
