= 2024 in Colombia =

- Decades: 2000s; 2010s; 2020s
- See also: Other events of 2024; Timeline of Colombian history

Events in the year 2024 in Colombia.

== Incumbents ==
- President: Gustavo Petro
- Vice President: Francia Márquez
- Government: Cabinet of Gustavo Petro

== Events ==
=== January ===
- January 4 – The Clan del Golfo detonate explosives at an army base in Turbo, Antioquia Department, killing a soldier and injuring 12 others.
- January 13 – El Carmen de Atrato landslide: A landslide in El Carmen de Atrato, Chocó, kills 37 people and injures at least 35 others.
- January 19 – One person dies after a magnitude 5.6 earthquake strikes the Valle del Cauca Department.

=== February ===
- February 27 – President Gustavo Petro announces the suspension of weapons purchases from Israeli manufacturers and acknowledges the Israeli invasion of the Gaza Strip as genocide.

=== April ===
- April 24 – Amazon rubber cycle: The Government of Colombia issues a formal apology to the indigenous communities of the Amazon basin for allowing the enslavement and systematic brutality they endured during the Amazon rubber boom in the 19th and 20th centuries.
- April 29 – An Mi-17 army helicopter crashes near Santa Rosa del Sur, Bolívar Department, killing all nine officers on board.

=== May ===
- May 2 – Colombia breaks diplomatic relations with Israel over its war in Gaza.
- May 16 – Elmer Fernandez, the director of the La Modelo prison in Bogotá, is shot dead by a motorcycled gunman while on his way home from work.
- May 20 – Six people are injured in a bomb attack in Jamundi blamed on FARC dissidents.
- May 28 – The Senate of Colombia approves a resolution banning Spanish-style bullfighting in the country.

=== June ===
- 10 June – Doe v. Chiquita Brands International: After 17 years of litigation, Chiquita Brands International is found liable by a jury in United States Federal Court of financing the far-right paramilitary death squad United Self-Defense Forces of Colombia in the Antioquia and Magdalena Departments.
- 10 June – One person is killed, and 20 others are injured after a cable car plunges into a sidewalk next to a station platform in Medellín.
- 29 June – The FARC-splinter group Segunda Marquetalia agrees to a "unilateral ceasefire" and the release of its captives following negotiations with the Colombian government held in Venezuela.

=== July ===
- 1 July – Larry Álvarez, a cofounder of the transnational crime group Tren de Aragua based in Venezuela, is arrested by police in Circasia, Quindío.
- 14 July:
  - Colombia loses 1-0 against Argentina at the 2024 Copa América final held in Miami.
  - Colombian Football Federation president Ramón Jesurún is arrested in Miami following an altercation related to the Colombian team's defeat to Argentina in the 2024 Copa América final. The charges against him are dropped on 26 August.
- 15 July – Clifton Suspension Bridge human remains discovery: Colombian Yostin Andres Mosquera is charged with the murders of two gay men and remanded in custody by Wimbledon Magistrates Court in London, United Kingdom.
- 16 July – The government ends its ceasefire agreement with dissident FARC factions, citing splits within the group.
- 22 July – President Petro signs into law a bill banning bullfighting in the country.

=== August ===
- 9–12 August – Sixty-six soldiers are abducted and held captive by villagers in Guaviare Department before being released.
- 15–19 August – The Duke and Duchess of Sussex, Prince Harry and Meghan Markle embark a four-day visit to Colombia, hosted by Vice President Francia Márquez, with a focus on promoting child online safety and women empowerment.
- 31 August–22 September – 2024 FIFA U-20 Women's World Cup

=== September ===
- 3 September – Truckers establish roadblocks around Bogotá, Medellín and Cali as part of a nationwide strike in protest over fuel increases.
- 6 September – The Administrative Court of Cundinamarca orders the Ministry of Environment and Sustainable Development to eradicate hippopotamuses introduced by Pablo Escobar and their descendants by December, citing threats to "ecological balance".
- 17 September – Two soldiers are killed, and 21 others are injured in an attack on an army base near Puerto Jordan, Arauca Department, that is blamed on the ELN, prompting the government to suspend peace negotiations with the group on 18 September.
- 23 September – The Egmont Group suspends Colombia's access to its financial crimes database in retaliation for President Gustavo Petro's decision to disclose classified information from the group regarding dealings made by his predecessor Ivan Duque with Pegasus spyware.

=== October ===
- 21 October–1 November – 2024 United Nations Biodiversity Conference in Cali.

=== November ===
- 2 November – Nine active and former military personnel are arrested on suspicion of weapons smuggling following a grenade attack on a toll booth in Bogotá in 2023.
- 26 November – President Petro announces the imposition of visa requirements on British nationals travelling to Colombia in response to the United Kingdom revoking visa-free access to Colombian nationals.

=== December ===
- 3 December – Simultaneous raids are carried out by authorities on 11 prisons nationwide as part of efforts to seize contraband.
- 7 December – One person is killed in a motorcycle bombing at a police checkpoint in Jamundi.

== Art and entertainment ==
- List of Colombian submissions for the Academy Award for Best International Feature Film
- List of 2024 box office number-one films in Colombia

== Holidays ==
- 1 January – New Year's Day
- 8 January – Three Kings Day
- 24 March – Palm Sunday
- 25 March – Saint Joseph's Day
- 28 March – Holy Thursday
- 29 March – Good Friday
- 31 March – Easter Sunday
- 1 May – Labor Day
- 13 May – Ascension Day
- 3 June – Feast of Corpus Christi
- 10 June – Sacred Heart
- 1 July – Feast of Saints Peter and Paul
- 20 July – Independence Day
- 7 August – Battle of Boyacá
- 19 August – Assumption Day
- 14 October – Columbus Day
- 4 November – All Saints' Day
- 11 November – Independence of Cartagena
- 8 December – Day of Immaculate Conception
- 25 December – Christmas Day

== Deaths ==
- 2 January – Juan Carlos Henao Pérez, 64, jurist (Colombian peace agreement) and academic, president of the Constitutional Court (2009–2010) and rector of Universidad Externado (2012–2021).
- 11 January – Efraín Antonio Ríos, 113, supercentenarian.
- 19 January – Mario E. Dorsonville, 63, Colombian-born American Roman Catholic prelate, auxiliary bishop of Washington (2015–2023) and bishop of Houma–Thibodaux (since 2023).
- 20 January – Piedad Córdoba, 68, politician, MP (1992–2010).
- 19 February – Rodrigo Pardo García-Peña, 65, politician, minister of foreign affairs (1994–1996).
- 24 March – José Agustín Valbuena Jáuregui, 96, Roman Catholic bishop.
- 21 May – Omar Geles, 57, accordionist, singer, and songwriter.
- 15 June – Rafael Campo Miranda, 105, songwriter.
- 2 September – Rodolfo Hernández Suárez, 79, politician, mayor of Bucaramanga (2016–2019), Senator (2022) and presidential candidate.
- 16 September – Luis Egurrola, 60, vallenato songwriter.
- 4 October –Marlon Pérez Arango, 48, professional road bicycle racer, murdered by stabbing
- 4 December – Rafael Nieto Navia, 86, diplomat, political scientist, and professor, president of the Inter-American Court of Human Rights (1987–1989).
