= 2026 in Colombia =

- Decades: 2000s; 2010s; 2020s
- See also: Other events of 2026; Timeline of Colombian history

List of events, including those predicted and scheduled, of 2026 in Colombia.

== Incumbents ==
- President: Gustavo Petro (until 7 August); Abelardo de la Espriella (since 7 August)
- Vice President: Francia Márquez (until 7 August); José Manuel Restrepo (since 7 August)

== Events ==
=== Ongoing ===
- Colombian conflict
  - Catatumbo campaign
  - United Nations Verification Mission in Colombia

=== January ===
- 2 January – Colombia assumes a two-year non-permanent seat at the United Nations Security Council.
- 3 January – President Petro orders the mobilization of security forces along the Colombia–Venezuela border in response to the 2026 United States intervention in Venezuela.
- 6 January – The National Liberation Army (ELN) abducts five police officers from a bus in the Catatumbo region. They are released on 19 January.
- 10 January – A Piper PA-31 Navajo crashes in Paipa, Boyacá Department, killing all six of its occupants, including singer Yeison Jiménez.
- 17 January –
  - At least 27 people are killed in clashes between rival FARC dissident groups in El Retorno, Guaviare Department.
  - Two freight wagons detach and roll into streets in Duitama, Boyacá Department, killing one person.
- 20 January – President Petro issues a decree reducing the wages of members of the Congress of Colombia by 30%, citing fiscal issues.
- 22 January – Colombia announces a 30% tariff on unspecified imports from Ecuador and suspends sales of electricity to the latter country in retaliation for Quito imposing a 30% tariff on Colombian goods the previous day.
- 28 January – SATENA Flight 8849: a Beechcraft 1900 operated by SATENA, crashes near Ocaña, Norte de Santander, on its way from Cúcuta, killing all 15 people on board including congressman Diógenes Quintero.
- 29 January – The government issues a decree restricting the importation of drones, citing their usage in attacks by armed anti-state forces.

=== February ===
- 4 February – Seven ELN rebels are killed in a military operation near the Venezuelan border.
- 5 February –
  - The United Kingdom imposes sanctions on three Colombians accused of recruiting mercenaries for the Rapid Support Forces in the Sudanese civil war (2023–present).
  - Santiago Gallon Henao, a suspect in the 1994 killing of football player Andrés Escobar, is shot dead in Mexico.
  - Six people are killed in a methane explosion at the Mata Siete coal mine in Guachetá.
- 6–22 February – Colombia at the 2026 Winter Olympics
- 6 February – Two people are killed while four others are reported missing following an ambush on a convoy of senator Jairo Castellanos in Arauca Department.
- 10 February –
  - President Petro announces that he had survived an assassination attempt along with his daughters aboard a helicopter.
  - Senator Aida Quilcué and two bodyguards are briefly abducted from their vehicle in Cauca Department.
  - At least 22 people are reported killed in flooding across four northern departments.
- 16 February – The Search Unit for Disappeared Persons announces the discovery and identification of the remains of Catholic priest turned ELN leadzer Camilo Torres Restrepo, who was killed fighting the military in 1966.
- 20 February – The ELN declares a unilateral ceasefire to allow for the holding of the 2026 Colombian parliamentary election on 8 March.

=== March ===
- 3 March – Authorities announce the arrest of 121 people in a nationwide operation against criminal groups and the ELN.
- 8 March – 2026 Colombian parliamentary election: President Petro's Historic Pact wins a plurality in both houses of Congress.
- 17 March – President Petro accuses Ecuador of infiltrating its territory and carrying out an airstrike that killed 27 people along their border.
- 18 March – Ángel Esteban Aguilar Morales aka Lobo Menor, an Ecuadorean national suspected of leading the Los Lobos gang, is arrested in Mexico and extradited to Colombia, where he is also wanted on charges of involvement with FARC dissidents.
- 23 March – 2026 Colombian Air Force Lockheed C-130 crash: A Lockheed C-130 Hercules of the Colombian Aerospace Force crashes during takeoff from Caucayá Airport in Puerto Leguízamo en route to Tres de Mayo Airport in Puerto Asís, both in Putumayo Department, killing 69 people.

=== April ===
- 20 April – Three soldiers are killed in drone strikes carried out by the rebel group Comandos de la Frontera in Ipiales.
- 24–29 April – The First Conference on Transitioning Away from Fossil Fuels is held in Santa Marta.
- 25 April – 2026 Cauca bombing: Twenty people are killed in a bomb attack on a bus blamed on FARC dissidents in Cauca Department.

=== May ===
- 3 May – Three people are killed and at least 38 are injured when a monster truck crashes into spectators during a stunt performance at a public exhibition in Popayán.
- 4 May – Nine people are killed in a gas explosion at a coal mine in Sutatausa.
- 16 May – Former Cubarral mayor Rogers Devia and his staffer are shot dead amid campaigning for the presidential election.
- 22 May – At least seven people are killed in territorial clashes between the Misak and Nasa indigenous groups in Silvia, Cauca.
- 31 May – 2026 Colombian presidential election (first round): Right-wing candidate Abelardo de la Espriella wins a plurality of 43.7% of the vote, followed by left-wing candidate Iván Cepeda with 40.9%.

=== June ===
- 11 June–19 July – Colombia participates at the 2026 FIFA World Cup
- 15 June – The ELN declares a unilateral ceasefire from 20 to 23 June to allow for the holding of the 2026 Colombian presidential election on 21 June.
- 16 June — The ELN release two police officers held captive in Arauca Department since 2025.
- 21 June – 2026 Colombian presidential election (second round): Abelardo de la Espriella is elected president with 49.66% of the vote, with Iván Cepeda garnering 48.7% and 1.6% of ballots cast as blank.

=== July ===
- 24 July – The United States imposes a 12.5% tariff on Colombia, citing the presence of alleged forced labor in the supply chain.

=== August ===
- 1 August – A truck bomb explodes near the Norte de Santander Police Command in Cúcuta, injuring 11 officers and killing a service dog.
- 7 August – Abelardo de la Espriella is inaugurated as president in a ceremony in Cali.
- 8 August –
  - Two security guards are injured in a bomb attack on a tollbooth in Cauca Department.
  - A police officer is killed in a drone attack in Cesar Department.
- 10 August –
  - A magnitude 7.4 earthquake hits Chocó Department, killing 331 people.
  - The government announces the killing of Hernando "El ruso" Forero Mosquera, the suspected leader of the FARC dissident faction Frente 28, and five other rebels following a military operation.
  - Colombia recognizes Israeli sovereignty over the Golan Heights.
- 12 August – Congress elects Jorge Eliécer Laverde Vargas as Comptroller General.
- 20 August – An unlicensed gold mine collapses in Nariño Department, killing 13 workers and injuring seven others.
- 29 August – President de la Espriella formally ends negotiations under the Petro administration's Total Peace policy.
- 30 August – At least 20 FARC dissidents are reported killed in an airstrike in Guaviare Department.
- 31 August – Viviane Morales resigns as education minister effective 7 September, citing personal reasons. She is replaced by Ilva Myriam Hoyos.

=== September ===
- 1 September –
  - A car bomb explodes near a police station in Los Patios, killing one and injuring 11.
  - The lifting of reciprocal visa requirements between Colombia and Israel comes into effect.
- 3 September – Naín Andrés Pérez Toncel aka "Bendito Menor", a leader of the armed group Conquering Self-Defense Forces of the Sierra Nevada, is killed in a security operation in Riohacha.
- 8 September –
  - Colombia–United States relations: The United States and Colombia sign a memorandum of understanding to strengthen cooperation on critical minerals and rare earths during a visit by US secretary of state Marco Rubio to Barranquilla.
  - President de la Espriella signs a decree lifting the nationwide suspension of permits to carry firearms that had been in place since 2015.
- 22 September – President de la Espriella deploys the army to Santa Marta following a series of attacks in the city blamed on the Conquering Self-Defense Forces of the Sierra Nevada.
- 25 September – Colombia severs relations with Iran, alleging that the Iranian government has connections to "narco-terrorist groups that threaten the country's security."

=== October ===
- 14 October – Colombia inaugurates its embassy in Jerusalem.
- 19 October – Fourteen people are killed and seven others are injured when an illegal gold mine collapses in Nariño Department.
- 24 October – At the Hip Hop al parque festival, rapper Chelo Hop chants “Free Palestine” and “Out with what does not belong” and steps on the Israeli flag.
- 27 October – Colombia declares its intention to leave the Hague Group, citing the latter's actions against Israel.

=== November ===
- 3 November – A magnitude 5.4 earthquake hits Tolima Department, damaging 120 homes.
- 14 November – A bus overturns in Huila Department, killing six people and injuring 11 others.
- 18 November – United States defense secretary Pete Hegseth delivers a C-130 Hercules to Colombia during a ceremony.

== Deaths ==
- 3 January – Hernán Giraldo Jaramillo, 89, Roman Catholic prelate, auxiliary bishop of Pereira (1984–1987), bishop of Málaga–Soatá (1987–2001) and of Buga (2001–2012).
- 5 January – Bonifacio Ávila, 75, Olympic boxer (1972).
- 9 January – Beatriz González, 93, painter, sculptor, critic, curator, and art historian.
- 10 January – Yeison Jiménez, 34, música popular singer and songwriter.
- 15 January – Dogardisc, champeta singer and songwriter.
- 28 January – Diógenes Quintero, 36, lawyer, human rights defender, and politician.
- 21 February – Liliana Angulo Cortés, 51, visual artist and academic, director of the National Museum of Colombia (since 2024).
- 23 March – Lucy Nieto de Samper, 102, journalist and writer.
- 11 April – Pedro Ramayá Beltrán, 96, flautist and songwriter.
- 24 April – Cristian Camilo Muñoz, 30, road racing cyclist.
- 8 May – Germán Vargas Lleras, 64, Vice President (2014–2017), minister of the interior (2010–2012), and president of the Senate (2003–2004).
- 17 May – Totó la Momposina, 85, singer.
- 5 June – Ovidio Granados, 84, vallenato accordionist.
- 21 July – Héctor Ochoa Cárdenas, 91, musician and composer.
- 25 August – Javier Giraldo, 82, priest and human rights activist.
- 29 September – Náfer Durán, 93, vallenato accordionist.
- 6 October – Víctor Hugo Ayala, 92, bolero singer.
- 15 October – Germán Quintero, 72, actor (Pablo Escobar, The Drug Lord, Pasión de Gavilanes, Rojo carmesí).
- 1 November – Antonio Navarro Wolff, 78, guerrilla leader (M-19), senator (2002–2006, 2014–2018).
