= Weightlifting at the 1960 Summer Olympics – Men's 67.5 kg =

Weightlifting at the Olympics

Men's 67.5 kg at the Games of the XVII Olympiad
- Venue: Palazzetto dello Sport
- Date: 8 September 1960
- Competitors: 33 from 29 nations
- Winning total: 397.5 kg WR

Medalists
1st place, gold medalist(s)		Viktor Bushuev	Soviet Union
2nd place, silver medalist(s)		Tan Howe Liang	Singapore
3rd place, bronze medalist(s)		Abdul-Wahid Aziz	Iraq

The men's 67.5 kg weightlifting competitions at the 1960 Summer Olympics in Rome took place on 8 September at the Palazzetto dello Sport. It was the ninth appearance of the lightweight class.

== Results ==
Rank	Name	Country	kg
1	Viktor Bushuev	Soviet Union	397.5
2	Tan Howe Liang	Singapore	380.0
3	Abdul-Wahid Aziz	Iraq	380.0
4	Marian Zieliński	Poland	375.0
5	Waldemar Baszanowski	Poland	370.0
6	Mihály Huszka	Hungary	365.0
7	Werner Dittrich	United Team of Germany	362.5
7	Zdeněk Otáhal	Czechoslovakia	362.5
9	Ney López	Colombia	357.5
10	Jin O-hyeon	South Korea	355.0
11	Roger Gerber	France	355.0
12	Fawzi Rasmy	United Arab Republic	352.5
13	Luciano De Genova	Italy	352.5
14	Henrik Tamraz	Iran	347.5
15	Juan Torres	Cuba	345.0
16	Josef Tauchner	Austria	340.0
17	Harry Webber	South Africa	340.0
18	Ben Helfgott	Great Britain	337.5
19	Robert Delebarre	France	335.0
20	Clément Haeyen	Belgium	325.0
21	Hans Kohler	Switzerland	322.5
22	Tommy Hayden	Ireland	307.5
23	Abderrahim Tazi	Morocco	307.5
24	Roger Hippertchen	Luxembourg	280.0
25	Ibrahim Mitwalli	Sudan	262.5
AC	Ivan Yordanov	Bulgaria	100.0
AC	Nil Tun Maung	Burma	117.5
AC	Hiroshi Yamazaki	Japan	217.5
AC	Abdul Ghani Butt	Pakistan	217.5
AC	Neville Pery	Australia	222.5
AC	Lee Taeg-yeong	South Korea	222.5
AC	Rudy Monk	Netherlands Antilles	DNF
AC	Kenji Onuma	Japan	DNF
