= 2022 in Colombia =

- Decades: 2000s; 2010s; 2020s
- See also: Other events of 2022; Timeline of Colombian history

Events in the year 2022 in Colombia.

== Incumbents ==
- President: Iván Duque Márquez (until 7 August), Gustavo Petro (since 7 August)
- Vice President: Marta Lucía Ramírez (until 7 August), Francia Márquez (since 7 August)
- Government: Cabinet of Gustavo Petro

== Events ==
=== January-March ===
- 24 January: Indigenous leader Albeiro Camayo is assassinated in Buenos Aires, Cauca; the Indigenous community blames the remnants of former FARC groups.
- 13 March: 2022 Colombian parliamentary election: A broad coalition of leftist and traditional parties win a majority in Congress. Some allegations of fraud and vote-buying are reported, but the results are deemed credible.

=== April-June ===
- 29 May: First round of the 2022 Colombian presidential election: No candidate receives an outright majority.
- 19 June: Runoff round in the 2022 Colombian presidential election: Gustavo Petro is elected as Colombia’s first leftist president with 50.4% of the vote. Francia Márquez is elected as vice president, becoming the first Afro-Colombian and second woman to hold the post.
- 26 June: 2022 Colombia stadium collapse: A wooden spectator stand collapses during a bullfight in El Espinal, killing six people and injuring 322 others.
- 28 June: Tuluá prison riot: A prison riot and fire at the Tuluá prison in Valle del Cauca kills at least 52 people and injures 34.

=== July-September ===
- 2 September: 2022 Huila attack: A bomb attack in San Luis kills seven police officers and injures one; FARC dissidents claim responsibility.
- 26 September: The Colombian-Venezuelan border reopened, as Maduro agrees to participate in peace talks with the ELN.

=== December ===
- 5 December: 2022 Risaralda landslide: A landslide in Risaralda Department buries a bus traveling from Cali, killing at least 33 people and critically injuring four others.

== Health ==
- 2022 monkeypox outbreak in Colombia
- COVID-19 pandemic in Colombia

== Deaths ==
- 26 July – Juancho Vargas, pianist and composer (b. 1934)
