= List of Olympic medalists for Singapore =

Singapore at the Olympics
- Flag of Singapore
- IOC code: SGP
- NOC: Singapore National Olympic Council
- Medals: Gold 1 Silver 2 Bronze 3 Total 6

Summer appearances
- 1948; 1952; 1956; 1960; 1964; 1968; 1972; 1976; 1980; 1984; 1988; 1992; 1996; 2000; 2004; 2008; 2012; 2016; 2020; 2024; 2028

Winter appearances
- 2018; 2022; 2026

Other related appearances
- Malaysia (1964)

Singapore debuted in the Olympics in 1948 but did not gain a medal. Since then, Singapore has participated in every Olympics edition except the 1980 Summer Olympics. The delegation won its first medal at the 1960 Summer Olympics when Tan Howe Liang gained silver in the Men's 67.5 kg event in weightlifting. The delegation won its first gold medal when Joseph Schooling succeeded in the Men's 100 meter butterfly in the 2016 Summer Olympics, also beating an Olympic record previously won by Michael Phelps. Overall, Singapore has won a gold medal, two silver medals, and three bronze medals.

== History ==
Singapore debuted in the Olympics as a British colony in 1948 when a sole representative, Lloyd Valberg, competed in the men's high jump; Valberg gained 14th place. Since then, Singapore has taken part in every Olympics edition except the 1980 Summer Olympics, when the country was one of many to boycott the event. In the 1960 Summer Olympics, Tan Howe Liang gained silver in the Men's 67.5 kg event in weightlifting despite feeling intense pain in his legs before the final lift. The next medal Singapore gained was in the 2008 Summer Olympics: Feng Tianwei, Li Jiawei, and Wang Yuegu gained a silver medal in the Women's team event in table tennis. Four years later, the same trio gained bronze in the same event. Feng, at the same edition, gained bronze in Women's singles. In the 2016 Summer Olympics, Joseph Schooling won a gold medal when he succeeded in the Men's 100 meter butterfly. This result beat Michael Phelps' Olympic record in the event. In the 2024 Summer Olympics, Max Maeder won bronze in the Men's Formula Kite in sailing.

== List of medalists ==
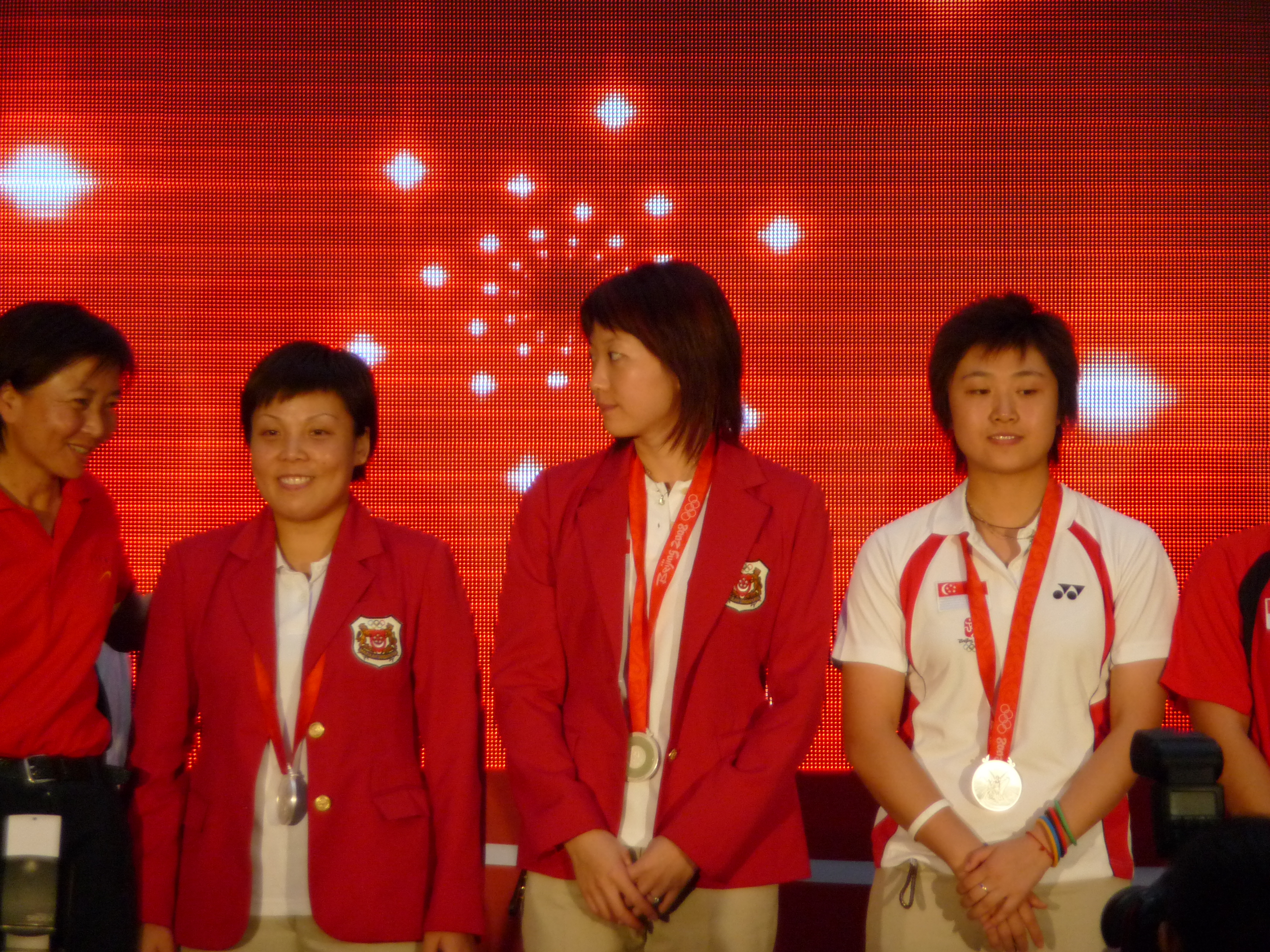
(L–R) Wang Yuegu, Li Jiawei, and Feng Tianwei gained a silver and a bronze medal for Singapore in the women's team event in table tennis.

A total of seven athletes, three of them partaking in a trio, have won one gold medal, two silver medals, and three bronze medals.

Medals won at the Summer Olympics
Name(s)	Medal	Sport	Event	Year	Location	Ref.
Tan Howe Liang	Silver	Weightlifting	Men's 67.5 kg	1960	Rome, Italy	
Feng Tianwei Li Jiawei Wang Yuegu	Silver	Table tennis	Women's team	2008	Beijing, China	
Feng Tianwei Li Jiawei Wang Yuegu	Bronze	Table tennis	Women's team	2012	London, United Kingdom	
Feng Tianwei	Bronze	Table tennis	Women's singles	2012	London, United Kingdom	
Joseph Schooling	Gold	Swimming	Men's 100 meter butterfly	2016	Rio de Janeiro, Brazil	
Max Maeder	Bronze	Sailing	Men's Formula Kite	2024	Paris, France	

=== Summer Youth Olympics ===
Nine medals have been credited to Singapore from the Youth Olympic Games: two are gold, three are silver, and four are bronze.

Medals won at the Summer Youth Olympics
Name(s)	Medal	Sport	Event	Year	Location	Ref.
Dhukhilan Jeevamani Radhi Kasim Jeffrey Lightfoot Sunny Ng Fashah Rosedin Illyas Lee Hanafi Akbar Hamzah Fazil Hazim Hassan Brandon Koh Irfan Aziz Mohamed Syazwan Mohamed Zin Iskandar Khairul Ammirul Emmran Firdaus Sham Bryan Neubronner Muhaimin Suhaimi Jonathan Tan	Bronze	Football	Boys' tournament	2010	Singapore	
Audrey Yong	Bronze	Sailing	Girls' Windsurfing	2010	Singapore	
Rainer Ng	Silver	Swimming	Boys' 50 meter backstroke	2010	Singapore	
Isabelle Li	Silver	Table tennis	Women's singles	2010	Singapore	
Daryl Tan	Bronze	Taekwondo	Boys' 55 kg	2010	Singapore	
Shafinas Abdul Rahman	Bronze	Taekwondo	Girls' 55 kg	2010	Singapore	
Bernie Chin	Gold	Sailing	Boys' One Person Dinghy	2014	Nanjing, China	
Samantha Yom	Gold	Sailing	Girls' One Person Dinghy	2014	Nanjing, China	
Martina Veloso	Silver	Shooting	Girls' 10 meter air rifle	2014	Nanjing, China	

== Other medalists ==
=== Mixed-NOCs medalists ===
Singapore has two medals from participants in a mixed team; the delegation gained one silver medal and one bronze medal.

Medals won at the Summer Youth Olympics
Name(s)	Medal	Sport	Event	Year	Location	Ref.
Abdud Dayyan bin Mohamed Jaffar	Bronze	Archery	Mixed team	2010	Singapore	
Teh Xiu Yi	Silver	Shooting	Mixed teams' 10 meter air pistol	2014	Nanjing, China	

== Medal tally by sport ==
=== Summer Olympics ===
Medal tally by sport (Summer Olympics)
Sport	Gold	Silver	Bronze	Total
Table tennis	0	1	2	3
Swimming	1	0	0	1
Weightlifting	0	1	0	1
Sailing	0	0	1	1
Total	1	2	3	6

=== Summer Youth Olympics ===
Medal tally by sport (Summer Youth Olympics)
Sport	Gold	Silver	Bronze	Total
Sailing	2	0	1	3
Taekwondo	0	0	2	2
Swimming	0	1	0	1
Table tennis	0	1	0	1
Shooting	0	1	0	1
Football	0	0	1	1
Total	2	3	4	9

==== Mixed-NOCs participation ====
Medal tally by sport
Sport	Gold	Silver	Bronze	Total
Shooting	0	1	0	1
Archery	0	0	1	1
Total	0	1	1	2

== Medal tally by individual ==
Medal tally by individual
Person(s)	Gold	Silver	Bronze	Total
Wang Yuegu, Li Jiawei, and Feng Tianwei	0	1	1	2
Joseph Schooling	1	0	0	1
Tan Howe Liang	0	1	0	1
Max Maeder	0	0	1	1
Feng Tianwei	0	0	1	1
Total	1	2	3	6

=== Multiple medalists ===
According to official data of the International Olympic Committee, this is a list of people who have won two or more Olympic medals for Singapore:

- ‡ – Still an active competitor

Multi-medalists
Athlete	Sport	Years	Games	Gender	1st place, gold medalist(s)	2nd place, silver medalist(s)	3rd place, bronze medalist(s)	Total
Feng Tianwei ‡	Table tennis	2008–present	Summer	Women	0	1	2	3
Li Jiawei	Table tennis	2000–2012	Summer	Women	0	1	1	2
Wang Yuegu	Table tennis	2005–2012	Summer	Women	0	1	1	2
