= List of 2026 box office number-one films in Colombia =

This is a list of films which placed number-one at the weekend box office in Colombia during 2026. Amounts are in American dollars.

#	Weekend end date	Film	Box office	Ref.
1	January 4, 2026	Avatar: Fire and Ash	$1,905,041	
2	January 11, 2026	Avatar: Fire and Ash	$1,270,865	
3	January 18, 2026	Avatar: Fire and Ash	$860,424	
4	January 25, 2026	Avatar: Fire and Ash	$433,382	
5	February 1, 2026	The Housemaid	$433,357	
6	February 8, 2026	Greenland 2: Migration	$428,143	
7	February 15, 2026	Hamnet	$59,018	
8	February 22, 2026	Avatar: Fire and Ash	$66,581	
9	March 1, 2026	Scream 7	$477,549	

== See also ==
- List of 2025 box office number-one films in Colombia
- 2025 in Colombia

Preceded by 2025 Box office number-one films	Box office number-one films 2026	Succeeded by 2027 Box office number-one films
