= 2023 in Colombia =

- Decades: 2000s; 2010s; 2020s
- See also: Other events of 2023; Timeline of Colombian history

Events in the year 2023 in Colombia.

== Incumbents ==
- President: Gustavo Petro
- Vice President: Francia Márquez
- Government: Cabinet of Gustavo Petro

== Events ==
=== January ===
- 1 January – Colombia and Venezuela agrees to reopen the last remaining border that has been previously blocked by authorities due to worsening ties.
- 20 January – A Dominican man who was lost in the Caribbean Sea for 24 days is rescued by the Colombian Navy.
- 19 January –12 February: 2023 South American U-20 Championship

=== March ===
- 28 March – ELN rebels launch homemade mortar shells at a military base in El Carmen, Norte de Santander, killing nine soldiers and injuring nine others.

=== May ===
- 1 May – a Cessna 206 light aircraft with seven people on board crashed in the jungle in the Caquetá Department, with the pilot and two adults died afterwards.

=== June ===
- 10 June – Having survived in the rainforest for 40 days, the remaining 4 passengers of the Cessna 206 aircraft, all children, were found and rescued by the Colombian military and rescuers and local volunteers.

=== August ===
- 3 August – Colombia and the National Liberation Army begin a six-month ceasefire aimed at creating peace between both sides.

=== September ===
- 4 September – Nine people are killed and five others are injured in clashes between FARC dissidents and the National Liberation Army in Arauca. It occurs as the army concludes a fourth round of peace talks with the government.
- 20 September – A car bomb explodes near a police station in Timba, Cauca Department, killing two people and wounding two others.

=== October ===
- 14 October: An annular solar eclipse will be visible in the Western U.S., Mexico, Central America, Colombia, and Brazil and will be the 44th solar eclipse of Solar Saros 134.
- 16 October: Colombia requests the departure of the Israeli ambassador following Colombian President Gustavo Petro's remarks criticizing Israel's actions. In response, Israel suspends security exports to the South American nation.
- 20 October: Colombian President Gustavo Petro announces the establishment of an embassy to the State of Palestine in Ramallah, West Bank, and announces humanitarian aid to the Gaza Strip amidst the ongoing Gaza war.
- 27 October: A retired Colombian army officer who participated in the 2021 assassination of Haitian president Jovenel Moïse is sentenced to life in a court in Miami.

=== November ===
- 2 November: Colombian Environment Minister Susana Muhamad announces plans to cull and sterilize around 166 hippopotamuses, descendants of those imported by drug lord Pablo Escobar, citing environmental concerns.

=== December ===
- 22 December – Assassination of Jovenel Moïse: A former Colombian soldier, Mario Antonio Palacios Palacios, pleads guilty to conspiring in the assassination of Haitian President Jovenel Moïse.
- 27 December – Colombia approves regulations that encourage local communities and indigenous groups to produce energy through renewable sources and sell it to the national grid.

== Health ==
- 2022–2023 mpox outbreak in Colombia
- COVID-19 pandemic in Colombia

== Deaths ==
- 8 January – Luis Gabriel Ramírez Díaz, 57, Roman Catholic prelate, bishop of El Banco (2014–2021) and Ocaña (since 2021).
- 18 January – Henry Caicedo, 71, footballer.
- 28 January – Adolfo Pacheco, 82, songwriter and musician.
- 10 February – Samuel Moreno Rojas, 62, lawyer and politician, Senator (1991–2006) and Mayor of Bogotá (2008–2011).
- 11 April – Miguel Escobar, 77, footballer.
- 19 April – Alfonso Araújo Cotes, 99, politician, governor of Cesar Department (1968–1970, 1975–1977).
- 5 May – Francisco Cristancho Hernández, musician and composer (b. 1941)
- 17 May:
  - Telésforo Pedraza Ortega, 77, politician.
  - Alicia Dussán de Reichel, 102, anthropologist and ethnologist.
- 26 July – Ceferina Banquez, 80, singer and songwriter.
- September – Hortensia Lanao, 95, vallenato songwriter
- 12 September – Miguel López, 85, accordionist
- 3 December – León Cardona, 96, musician and songwriter.
