= Telesforo =

Telesforo or Telésforo is a masculine given name derived from Telesphorus. It may refer to:

- Telesforo Castillejos (born 1947), Filipino politician and former provincial governor
- Telésforo Isaac (born 1929), retired Episcopal bishop in the Dominican Republic
- Telesforo Monzón (1904–1981), Basque writer, politician and nationalist Basque leader
- Telésforo Pedraza Ortega (born 1945), Colombian politician, diplomat and lawyer
- Telésforo Santiago Enríquez (died 2019), Mexican radio journalist, professor and murder victim
- Telesforo Trinidad (1890–1968), United States Navy fireman awarded the Medal of Honor
