= Guillermo Balboa =

Mexican weightlifter (born 1930)

Personal information
- Nationality: Mexican
- Born: 1930 (age 94–95)

Sport
- Sport: Weightlifting

Guillermo Balboa (born 1930) is a Mexican weightlifter. He competed in the men's lightweight event at the 1956 Summer Olympics.
