= Fawzi Rasmy =

Egyptian weightlifter

Personal information
- Nationality: Egyptian
- Born: 1935 (age 89–90); Alexandria, Egypt

Sport
- Sport: Weightlifting

Fawzi Rasmy (born 1935) is an Egyptian weightlifter. He competed in the men's lightweight event at the 1960 Summer Olympics.
