= 1959 World Weightlifting Championships =

International weightlifting competition

1959 Men's World Championships

The 1959 Men's World Weightlifting Championships were held in Warsaw, Poland from September 29 to October 4, 1959. There were 85 men in action from 19 nations.

The Soviet Union earned the most gold medals (4) and the most overall medals (7). Host nation Poland finished second with one gold and five overall medals.

Four World Records were broken: in 82.5 kg category, Rudolf Plyukfelder of the Soviet Union set two new world records in the snatch (141 kg) and the total (457.5 kg), while Ireneusz Paliński of Poland set a new world record in the clean & jerk (178.5 kg). Plyukfelder's total would have also won the 90 kg category.

In the 90+ kg category, Yury Vlasov of the Soviet Union broke the world record in the snatch (153 kg).

== Medal summary ==
Event	Gold		Silver		Bronze	
Bantamweight; 56 kg	Vladimir Stogov; Soviet Union	332.5 kg	Marian Jankowski; Poland	320.0 kg	Imre Földi; Hungary	295.0 kg
Featherweight; 60 kg	Marian Zieliński; Poland	365.0 kg	Isaac Berger; United States	362.5 kg	Sebastiano Mannironi; Italy	350.0 kg
Lightweight; 67.5 kg	Viktor Bushuev; Soviet Union	385.0 kg	Akop Faradzhyan; Soviet Union	370.0 kg	Abdul-Wahid Aziz; Iraq	362.5 kg
Middleweight; 75 kg	Tommy Kono; United States	425.0 kg	Fyodor Bogdanovsky; Soviet Union	417.5 kg	Jan Bochenek; Poland	392.5 kg
Light heavyweight 82.5 kg	Rudolf Plyukfelder; Soviet Union	457.5 kg	Ireneusz Paliński; Poland	432.5 kg	Jim George; United States	417.5 kg
Middle heavyweight 90 kg	Louis Martin; Great Britain	445.0 kg	Arkady Vorobyov; Soviet Union	445.0 kg	Czesław Białas; Poland	422.5 kg
Heavyweight +90 kg	Yury Vlasov; Soviet Union	500.0 kg	James Bradford; United States	492.5 kg	Ivan Veselinov; Bulgaria	455.0 kg

== Medal table ==
Rank	Nation	Gold	Silver	Bronze	Total
1	Soviet Union	4	3	0	7
2	Poland	1	2	2	5
3	United States	1	2	1	4
4	Great Britain	1	0	0	1
5	Bulgaria	0	0	1	1
5	Hungary	0	0	1	1
5	Iraq	0	0	1	1
5	Italy	0	0	1	1
Totals (8 entries)		7	7	7	21
