= 2024 El Carmen de Atrato landslide =

Landslide in El Carmen de Atrato, Colombia

- Date: 12 January 2024
- Location: El Carmen de Atrato, Chocó Department, Colombia; 5.535°N 76.014°W
- Type: Landslide
- Cause: Heavy rains
- Deaths: 37
- Injuries: 35+
- Missing: Unknown

On 12 January 2024, a large landslide occurred in El Carmen de Atrato, Colombia, killing at least 37 people and injuring at least 35 others.

== Background ==
Despite a drought, Colombia has experienced heavy rains. In the days before the landslide, significant rainfall had occurred in the Chocó region.
