= Willi Kolb =

German weightlifter

Personal information
- Nationality: German
- Born: 18 February 1934 (age 91)

Sport
- Sport: Weightlifting

Willi Kolb (born 18 February 1934) is a German weightlifter. He competed in the men's lightweight event at the 1956 Summer Olympics.
