= Télesphore =

Télesphore may refer to:

== People ==
- Jacques Telesphore Roman (1800–1848), Louisiana businessman, sugar planter and builder of Oak Alley Plantation
- Télesphore Fournier PC (1823–1896), Canadian politician and jurist
- Télesphore Simard (mayor) (1878–1955), Canadian politician, serving as Mayor of Quebec City
- Télesphore Simard (MNA) (1863–1924), Canadian politician and member of the Legislative Assembly of Quebec for Témiscamingue
- Telesphore Toppo (born 1939), Cardinal Priest and Archbishop of Ranchi in the Roman Catholic Church
- Télesphore-Damien Bouchard (1881–1962), politician in Quebec, Canada
- Télesphore-Eusèbe Normand, politician from Quebec, Canada

== Places ==
- Saint-Télesphore, Quebec, municipality located in Quebec, Canada

== See also ==
- Telesphorus (disambiguation)
