= Czesław Białas =

Polish weightlifter (1931–1991)

Czeslaw Bialas
Personal information
- Full name: Czesław Gerwazy Białas
- Born: 19 June 1931 Szopienice, Poland
- Died: 24 June 1991 (aged 60) Katowice, Poland
- Height: 169 cm (5 ft 7 in)
- Weight: 82–90 kg (181–198 lb)

Sport
- Country: Poland
- Sport: Weightlifting
- Weight class: 82.5-90 kg
- Club: HKS Szopienice
- Team: National team
Medal record
Men's Weightlifting
Representing Poland
World Championships
Bronze medal – third place	1959 Warsaw	90 kg
- Updated on 7 October 2016

Czesław Gerwazy Białas (19 June 1931 in Szopienice – 24 June 1991 in Katowice) was a Polish male weightlifter, who competed in the light-heavyweight and middle-heavyweight class and represented Poland at international competitions. He won the bronze medal at the 1959 World Weightlifting Championships in the 90 kg category. He participated at the 1952 Summer Olympics in the 82.5 kg event, at the 1956 Summer Olympics in the 90 kg event and at the 1960 Summer Olympics in the 90 kg event.

Białas also achieved the following podium finishes at European championships: bronze in the 1955 European Championships Light-Heavyweight class (385.0 kg); gold in the 1957 European Championships Middle-Heavyweight class (420.0 kg) and bronze in the 1959 European Championships Middle-Heavyweight class (422.5 kg).
