= Ibrahim Mitwalli =

Sudanese weightlifter

Personal information
- Nationality: Sudanese
- Born: 13 February 1938 (age 87); Khartoum, Sudan

Sport
- Sport: Weightlifting

Ibrahim Mitwalli (born 13 February 1938) is a Sudanese weightlifter. He competed in the men's lightweight event at the 1960 Summer Olympics.
