= Juan Torres (weightlifter) =

Cuban weightlifter (born 1936)

Personal information
- Born: 23 June 1936 (age 88); Havana, Cuba

Sport
- Sport: Weightlifting

Juan Torres (born 23 June 1936) is a Cuban weightlifter. He competed in the men's lightweight event at the 1960 Summer Olympics.
