= Américo Ferreira =

Brazilian weightlifter (1934–2007)

Personal information
- Born: 27 January 1934; São Paulo, Brazil
- Died: 12 April 2007 (aged 73)

Sport
- Sport: Weightlifting

Américo Ferreira (27 January 1934 – 12 April 2007) was a Brazilian weightlifter. He competed in the men's lightweight event at the 1956 Summer Olympics. Ferreira died on 12 April 2007, at the age of 73.
