= List of 2025 box office number-one films in Colombia =

This is a list of films which placed number-one at the weekend box office in Colombia during 2025. Amounts are in American dollars.

#	Weekend end date	Film	Box office	Ref.
1	January 5, 2025	Avatar: Fire and Ash	$1,780,937	
2	January 12, 2025	Avatar: Fire and Ash	$1,105,528	
3	January 19, 2025	Avatar: Fire and Ash	$733,303	
4	January 26, 2025	The Housemaid	$494,057	
5	February 2, 2025	Mufasa: The Lion King	$245,592	
6	February 9, 2025	Mufasa: The Lion King	$221,995	
7	February 16, 2025	Captain America: Brave New World	$1,391,870	
8	February 23, 2025	Captain America: Brave New World	$707,337	
9	March 2, 2025	Captain America: Brave New World	$467,225	
10	March 9, 2025	Captain America: Brave New World	$318,495	
11	March 16, 2025	Captain America: Brave New World	$279,103	
12	March 23, 2025	Snow White	$815,146	
13	March 30, 2025	Snow White	$451,952	
14	April 6, 2025	A Minecraft Movie	$1,732,421	
15	April 13, 2025	A Minecraft Movie	$885,624	
16	April 20, 2025	A Minecraft Movie	$766,602	
17	April 27, 2025	A Minecraft Movie	$485,359	
18	May 4, 2025	Thunderbolts*	$1,185,266	
19	May 11, 2025	Thunderbolts*	$438,892	
20	May 18, 2025	Thunderbolts*	$306,092	
21	May 25, 2025	Lilo & Stitch	$4,044,339	
22	June 1, 2025	Lilo & Stitch	$3,049,199	
23	June 8, 2025	Lilo & Stitch	$1,479,105	
24	June 15, 2025	How to Train Your Dragon	$1,328,706	
25	June 22, 2025	How to Train Your Dragon	$1,024,249	
26	June 29, 2025	F1: The Movie	$953,226	
27	July 6, 2025	Jurassic World: Rebirth	$1,709,852	
28	July 13, 2025	Superman	$1,558,107	
29	July 20, 2025	Superman	$1,037,761	
30	July 27, 2025	The Fantastic Four: First Steps	$1,223,293	
31	August 3, 2025	The Fantastic Four: First Steps	$678,268	
32	August 10, 2025	Freakier Friday	$820,994	
33	August 17, 2025	Freakier Friday	$513,168	
34	August 24, 2025	Freakier Friday	$381,722	
35	August 31, 2025	Freakier Friday	$302,801	
36	September 7, 2025	The Conjuring: Last Rites	$2,877,903	
37	September 14, 2025	Demon Slayer: Kimetsu no Yaiba Infinity Castle	$2,430,149	
38	September 21, 2025	The Conjuring: Last Rites	$689,836	
39	September 28, 2025	The Conjuring: Last Rites	$376,532	
40	October 5, 2025	The Conjuring: Last Rites	$274,053	
41	October 12, 2025	Tron: Ares	$778,676	
42	October 19, 2025	Black Phone 2	$419,587	
43	October 26, 2025	Black Phone 2	$267,570	
44	November 2, 2025	Black Phone 2	$229,479	
45	November 9, 2025	Predator: Badlands	$733,617	
46	November 16, 2025	Now You See Me: Now You Don't	$702,883	
47	November 23, 2025	Now You See Me: Now You Don't	$460,104	
48	November 30, 2025	Zootopia 2	$2,885,386	
49	December 7, 2025	Zootopia 2	$1,332,096	
50	December 14, 2025	Zootopia 2	$1,211,058	
51	December 21, 2025	Avatar: Fire and Ash	$2,482,321	
52	December 28, 2025	Avatar: Fire and Ash	$2,870,082	

== Highest-grossing films ==
Highest-grossing films of 2025 (In-year releases)
Rank	Title	Distributor	Domestic gross
1	Lilo & Stitch	Walt Disney Pictures	$15,391,353
2	Avatar: Fire and Ash	Walt Disney Pictures	$14,210,037
3	Zootopia 2	Walt Disney Pictures	$12,211,261
4	The Conjuring: Last Rites	Warner Bros.	$8,370,335
5	A Minecraft Movie	Warner Bros.	$6,502,062
6	How to Train Your Dragon	Universal Pictures	$6,194,993

== See also ==
- List of 2024 box office number-one films in Colombia
- 2025 in Colombia

Preceded by 2024 Box office number-one films	Box office number-one films 2025	Succeeded by 2026 Box office number-one films
