= Roger Hippertchen =

Luxembourgish weightlifter

Personal information
- Nationality: Luxembourgish
- Born: 21 October 1923; Esch-sur-Alzette, Luxembourg
- Died: 21 February 1984 (aged 60); Esch-sur-Alzette, Luxembourg

Sport
- Sport: Weightlifting

Roger Hippertchen (21 October 1923 – 21 February 1984) was a Luxembourgish weightlifter. He competed in the men's lightweight event at the 1960 Summer Olympics.
