= Hans Kohler (weightlifter) =

Swiss weightlifter

Personal information
- Nationality: Swiss
- Born: 25 December 1929; Lüsslingen, Switzerland
- Died: 15 April 2011 (aged 81); Solothurn, Switzerland

Sport
- Sport: Weightlifting

Hans Kohler (25 December 1929 – 15 April 2011) was a Swiss weightlifter. He competed in the men's lightweight event at the 1960 Summer Olympics.
