= Ivan Yordanov (weightlifter) =

Bulgarian weightlifter

Personal information
- Nationality: Bulgarian
- Born: 26 May 1939 (age 85); Veliko Tarnovo, Bulgaria

Sport
- Sport: Weightlifting

Ivan Yordanov (Bulgarian: Иван Йорданов; born 26 May 1939) is a Bulgarian weightlifter. He competed in the men's lightweight event at the 1960 Summer Olympics.
