= Telesphorus =

Telesphorus may refer to:

- Telesphorus (general), 4th century BC general in ancient Greece
- Pope Telesphorus (died c. 137), Bishop of Rome and Christian saint
- Telesphorus of Cosenza, a name assumed by a 14th-century pseudo-prophet during the time of the Western Schism
- Telesphorus (mythology), an ancient Greek minor god

== See also ==
- Télesphore (disambiguation)
- Telesforo, a given name
