= Robert Delebarre =

French weightlifter

Personal information
- Nationality: French
- Born: 19 January 1941 (age 85) Douvrin, France

Sport
- Sport: Weightlifting

Robert Delebarre (born 19 January 1941) is a French weightlifter. He competed in the men's lightweight event at the 1960 Summer Olympics.
