= 2027 in Colombia =

- Decades: 2000s; 2010s; 2020s
- See also: Other events of 2027; Timeline of Colombian history

List of events, including those predicted and scheduled, of 2027 in Colombia.

== Events ==
=== Ongoing ===
- Colombian conflict
  - Catatumbo campaign
  - United Nations Verification Mission in Colombia

=== Scheduled ===
- 20–27 September – 2027 World Archery Championships
- October – Colombia will require ABS on all new motorcycles from 150 cc or 11 kW, otherwise CBS (or ABS) from 50 cc or 4 kW.
- TBA – 2027 National Games of Colombia
