= Viktor Bushuev =

Russian weightlifter (1933–2003)

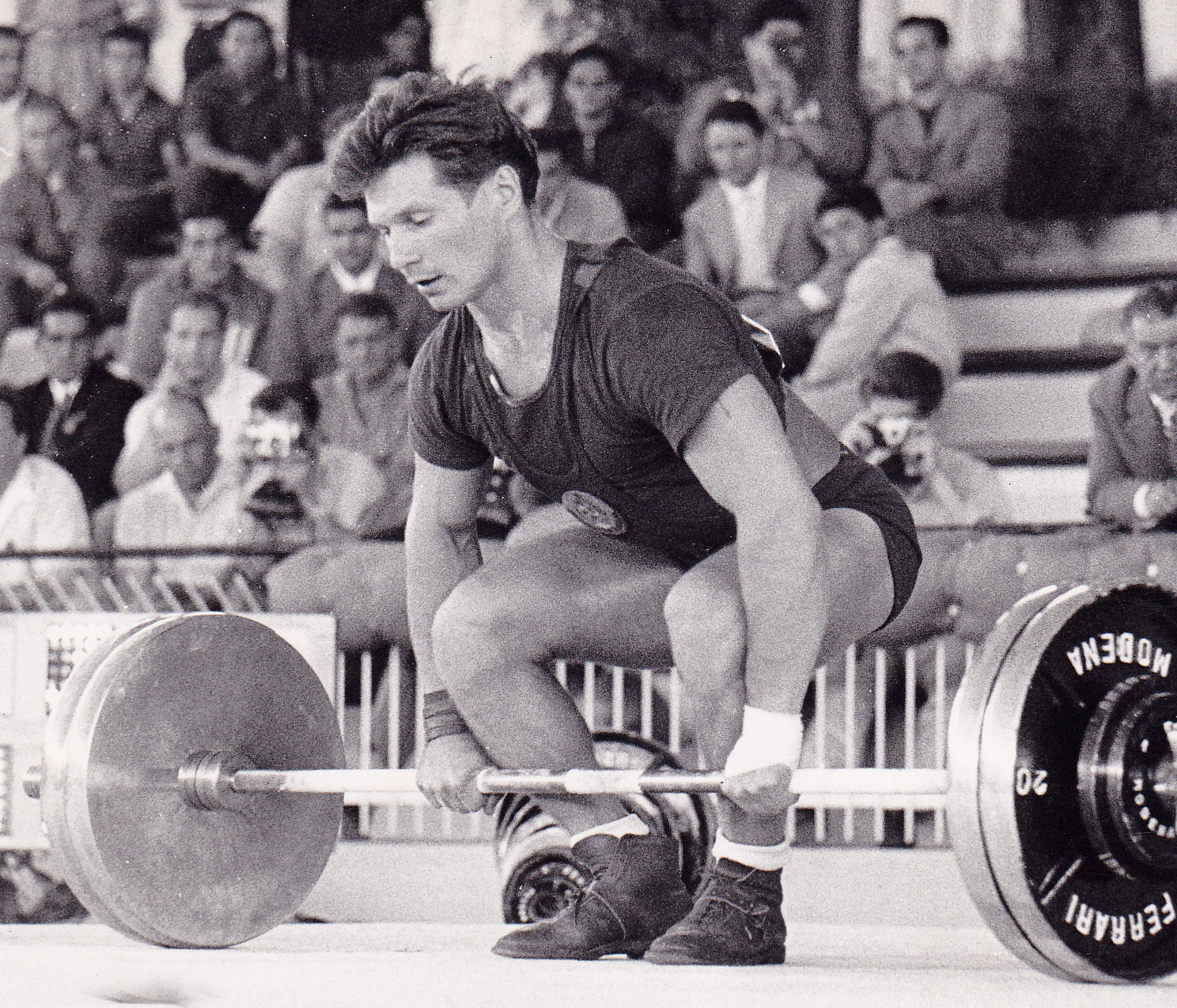
- Viktor Bushuev at the 1960 Olympics

Personal information
- Full name: Viktor Georgievich Bushuev
- Born: 18 May 1933 Balakhna, Nizhny Novgorod, RSFSR, Soviet Union
- Died: 25 April 2003 (aged 69) Nizhny Novgorod, Russia
- Height: 1.62 m (5 ft 4 in)
- Weight: 67 kg (148 lb)

Sport
- Sport: Weightlifting
- Club: Trud Nizhny Novgorod
Medal record
Representing the Soviet Union
Olympic Games
Gold medal – first place	1960 Rome	-67.5 kg
World Weightlifting Championships
Gold medal – first place	1957 Tehran	-67.5 kg
Gold medal – first place	1958 Stockholm	-67.5 kg
Gold medal – first place	1959 Warsaw	-67.5 kg

Viktor Georgievich Bushuev (Russian: Виктор Георгиевич Бушуев; 18 May 1933 – 25 April 2003) was a Soviet and Russian weightlifter. During his career, he won three world titles (1957–1959) and an Olympic gold medal (1960), and set three official and two unofficial world records, all in the total.

Bushuev was selected to the national team in 1955 and dominated his 67.5 kg weight category until 1960. He retired in 1964 after failing the national trials for the Olympic team and became a weightlifting coach in his native Nizhny Novgorod.
