= Orlando Cabrales Martínez =

Colombian politician (1939–2025)

Minister of Economic Development
- In office 1996–1997
- Preceded by: Rodrigo Marín Bernal
- Succeeded by: Carlos Julio Gaitán González

Minister of Mines and Energy
- In office 1997–1998
- Preceded by: Rodrigo Villamizar Alvargonzález
- Succeeded by: Luis Carlos Valenzuela Delgado

Personal details
- Born: Orlando José Cabrales Martínez; 19 August 1939; Cartagena, Colombia
- Died: 5 January 2025 (aged 85); Bogotá, Colombia
- Political party: PLC
- Education: Pontifical Bolivarian University
- Occupation: Engineer

Orlando José Cabrales Martínez (19 August 1939 – 5 January 2025) was a Colombian politician. A member of the Liberal Party, he served as Minister of Economic Development from 1996 to 1997 and was Minister of Mines and Energy from 1997 to 1998.

Cabrales died in Bogotá on 5 January 2025, at the age of 85.
