= List of 2024 box office number-one films in Colombia =

This is a list of films which placed number-one at the weekend box office in Colombia during 2024. Amounts are in American dollars.

== Number-one films ==
†	This implies the highest-grossing movie of the year.

#	Weekend	Film	Overall Gross
1	Jan 4–7	Aquaman and the Lost Kingdom	$2,057,792
2	Jan 11–14	Aquaman and the Lost Kingdom	$1,591,100
3	Jan 18–21	The Beekeeper	$1,548,078
4	Jan 25–28	The Boy and the Heron	$1,620,693
5	Feb 1–4	The Boy and the Heron	$1,423,695
6	Feb 8–11	The Boy and the Heron	$1,088,969
7	Feb 15–18	Madame Web	$1,202,691
8	Feb 22–25	Demon Slayer: Kimetsu no Yaiba – To the Hashira Training	$1,483,563
9	Feb 29-Mar 3	Dune: Part Two	$1,485,124
10	Mar 7–10	Dune: Part Two	$1,593,863
11	Mar 14–17	Kung Fu Panda 4	$1,925,965
12	Mar 21–24	Kung Fu Panda 4	$1,555,721
13	Mar 28–31	Godzilla x Kong: The New Empire	$2,768,128
14	Apr 4-7	Godzilla x Kong: The New Empire	$1,726,667
15	Apr 11-14	Godzilla x Kong: The New Empire	$1,505,309
16	Apr 18-21	Godzilla x Kong: The New Empire	$1,144,620
17	Apr 25-28	Godzilla x Kong: The New Empire	$1,138,696
18	May 2-5	The Garfield Movie	$1,311,458
19	May 9-12	Kingdom of the Planet of the Apes	$1,997,314
20	May 16-19	Kingdom of the Planet of the Apes	$994,335
21	May 23-26	Kingdom of the Planet of the Apes	$1,561,593
22	May 30-Jun 2	Kingdom of the Planet of the Apes	$1,616,127
23	Jun 6-9	Bad Boys: Ride or Die	$1,914,126
24	Jun 13-16	Inside Out 2 †	$5,847,173
25	Jun 20-23	Inside Out 2 †	$4,968,770
26	Jun 27-30	Inside Out 2 †	$4,171,411
27	Jul 4-7	Inside Out 2 †	$2,756,863
28	Jul 11-14	Despicable Me 4	$1,397,964
29	Jul 18-21	Despicable Me 4	$1,705,035
30	Jul 25-28	Deadpool & Wolverine	$4,651,621
31	Aug 1-4	Deadpool & Wolverine	$2,721,036
32	Aug 8-11	Deadpool & Wolverine	$1,569,809
33	Aug 15-18	It Ends with Us	$2,034,158
34	Aug 22-25	It Ends with Us	$1,640,029
35	Aug 29-Sep 1	It Ends with Us	$1,367,062
36	Sep 5-8	Beetlejuice Beetlejuice	$1,583,735
37	Sep 12-15	Beetlejuice Beetlejuice	$1,387,751
38	Sep 19-22	Beetlejuice Beetlejuice	$1,225,572
39	Sep 26-29	Beetlejuice Beetlejuice	$859,143
40	Oct 3-6	Joker: Folie à Deux	$1,543,825
41	Oct 10-13	The Wild Robot	$1,674,324
42	Oct 17-20	The Wild Robot	$1,001,650
43	Oct 24-27	Venom: The Last Dance	$1,744,963
44	Oct 31-Nov 3	Venom: The Last Dance	$1,909,993
45	Nov 7-10	Red One	$1,692,197
46	Nov 14-17	Red One	$1,004,842
47	Nov 21-24	Red One	$1,295,612
48	Nov 28-Dec 1	Moana 2	$2,655,423
49	Dec 5-8	Moana 2	$1,406,779
50	Dec 12-15	Moana 2	$1,406,955
51	Dec 19-22	Mufasa: The Lion King	$1,637,207
52	Dec 26-29	Mufasa: The Lion King	$2,310,583

== See also ==
- List of 2025 box office number-one films in Colombia
