= Lucy Nieto de Samper =

Colombian journalist (1923–2026)

Lucy Nieto de Samper (21 August 1923 – 23 March 2026) was a Colombian journalist and writer.

== Life and career ==
Lucy Nieto de Samper was born in Bogotá on 21 August 1923, the daughter of Luis Eduardo Nieto Caballero and María Calderón Umaña.

She began in journalism in the magazine Cromos from 1952 to 1962. In 1963, she joined the newspaper El Tiempo where she was a writer and columnist for the section Cosas que pasan.

Between 1974 and 1982, she was a press secretary of the President of Colombia during the governments of Virgilio Barco Vargas and Alfonso López Michelsen. She was the presenter of the program Contrapunto femenino with Gloria Valencia de Castaño and Beatriz de Vieco.

Nieto de Samper died on 23 March 2026, at the age of 102.
