= Eugenio Baena Calvo =

Colombian journalist (1953–2025)

- Born: September 28, 1953; Cartagena, Colombia
- Died: August 8, 2025 (aged 71); Cartagena, Colombia
- Occupations: Journalist, sports commentator
- Years active: 1972–2025
- Employer: Caracol Radio
- Known for: El Fenómeno del Fútbol (Caracol Radio)

Eugenio Baena Calvo (Spanish: [euˈxenjo βaˈena ˈkalβo]; September 28, 1953 – August 8, 2025) was a Colombian journalist and sports commentator.

== Life and career ==
Baena was born in Cartagena de Indias, on September 28, 1953. His journalistic career began commenting on baseball and boxing on Radio Fuentes alongside Napoleón Perea Castro, he collaborated in the morning radio program Buenos días con Melanio Porto in the 1980s. He worked at Todelar Radio commenting on baseball, soccer, boxing and speed skating where he commented on the competitions of his daughter Cecilia Baena.

Baena commented on the Olympic, Pan-American, Central American and Caribbean, Bolivarian and National Games where he accompanied national athletes in the different national competitions on RCN Radio. He was a commentator for Major League Baseball, the Baseball World Cup and the Colombian Professional Baseball League on Telecaribe and Win Sports, a sports presenter for CM&, and a sports columnist for the newspaper El Universal.

He joined Caracol Radio where he commented on the Primera A Category, Copa Colombia, Primera B finals, FIFA World Cup and the FIFA Confederations Cup.

On July 30, 2025, it was announced that Baena was under medical supervision due to suffering multiple cardiac arrests. He died at the Neurodynamics Clinic in Cartagena, on August 8, after suffering cardiac complications.
