= Abdul Ghani Butt =

Pakistani weightlifter (born 1939)

Personal information
- Nationality: Pakistani
- Born: 15 January 1939 (age 86); Gujranwala, Pakistan

Sport
- Sport: Weightlifting

Abdul Ghani Butt (born 15 January 1939) is a Pakistani weightlifter. He competed in the men's lightweight event at the 1960 Summer Olympics.
