= Abdul-Wahid Aziz =

Iraqi weightlifter (1931–1982)

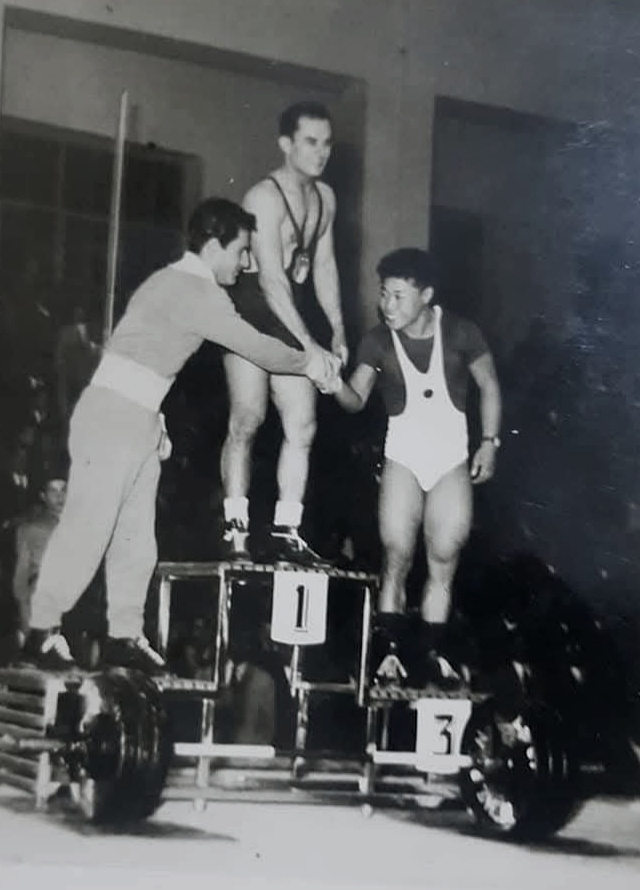
- Abdul-Wahid Aziz (centre)

Personal information
- Born: 1931 Basra, Iraq
- Died: 19 July, 1982 Baghdad, Iraq
- Height: 174 cm (5 ft 9 in)
- Weight: 67.5 kg (149 lb)

Sport
- Country: Iraq
- Sport: Weightlifting

Olympic medal record

Men's weightlifting

Representing Iraq

Olympic Games
Bronze medal – third place	1960 Rome	-67.5 kg

World Championships
Bronze medal – third place	1959 Warsaw	-67.5 kg

Abdul-Wahid Aziz (Arabic: عبد الواحد عزيز) (1931 – 19 July 1982) was an Iraqi weightlifter. He won a bronze medal in the lightweight division at the 1960 Summer Olympics, and, as of the 2024 Paris Olympics, remains the only person to win an Olympic medal for Iraq.

Aziz was imprisoned twice for his leftist political views; once in 1963 during the Ramadan Revolution, and again in 1980 during the Saddam Hussein regime.
