= Ravil Khabutdinov =

Russian weightlifter (1928–1997)

- Khabutdinov (left) at the 1956 Olympics

Personal information
- Born: 15 December 1928 Zimnik, Kemerovo Oblast, Russian SFSR, Soviet Union
- Died: 1 November 1997 (aged 68) Oktyabrsky, Bashkortostan, Russia
- Weight: 67 kg (148 lb)

Sport
- Sport: Olympic weightlifting
- Club: Soviet Army, Novosibirsk
Medal record
Representing the Soviet Union
Olympic Games
Silver medal – second place	1956 Melbourne	Lightweight
European Championships
Silver medal – second place	1956 Helsinki	Middleweight
Gold medal – first place	1957 Katowice	Lightweight

Ravil Nezamovich Khabutdinov (Russian: Равиль Незамович Хабутдинов; 15 December 1928 – 1 November 1997) was a weightlifter from Russia. He started training in weightlifting in 1948 while serving in the Soviet Army. In 1956, he finished third at the national championships, but was selected for the national team and won silver medals at the 1956 Summer Olympics and European championships, both times behind Ihor Rybak. Next year, in absence of Rybak, he won the European and national lightweight titles and retired from competitions. During his career Khabutdinov set seven ratified world records in press, six in the lightweight class and one in the middleweight category.
