= Luciano De Genova =

Italian weightlifter (1931–2019)

Personal information
- Nationality: Italian
- Born: 19 May 1931 Genoa, Italy
- Died: 10 November 2019 (aged 88)
- Height: 1.65 m (5 ft 5 in)
- Weight: 67.5 kg (149 lb; 10.63 st)

Sport
- Country: Italy
- Sport: Weightlifting
- Event: -67.5 kg class
Medal record
Men's Weightlifting
Representing Italy
World Championships
Silver medal – second place	1958 Stockholm	67.5 kg
European Championships
Silver medal – second place	1955 Munich	67.5 kg
Bronze medal – third place	1956 Helsinki	67.5 kg
Silver medal – second place	1958 Stockholm	67.5 kg

Luciano De Genova (19 May 1931 – 10 November 2019) was an Italian weightlifter. He represented Italy at the 1956 and 1960 Summer Olympic Games, competing in the Lightweight (67.5 kg) category.

== Career ==
De Genova was born in Genoa. He first competed outside Italy in the 1955 European Weightlifting Championships, finishing runner-up to Russian Nikolay Kostylev. The next year, De Genova finished third with a total of 347.5 kg.

He took part in the Melbourne 1956 Summer Olympics where he finished in 16th place out of 18 athletes — his poor performance coming partly as a result of a muscle strain.

In 1958, De Genova participated in the European Weightlifting Championships and the World Weightlifting Championships, receiving a silver medal in both competitions.

Luciano earned a 13th-place finish at the Rome 1960 Summer Olympics, finishing with a total lift of 352.5 kg.
