= Chin Oh-hyon =

South Korean weightlifter

Personal information
- Nationality: South Korean
- Born: 23 June 1936 (age 89); Seoul, South Korea

Sport
- Sport: Weightlifting

Chin Oh-hyon (born 23 June 1936) is a South Korean weightlifter. He competed in the men's lightweight event at the 1960 Summer Olympics, placing 10th.
