= 2022 El Espinal stadium collapse =

Structural collapse in Tolima, Colombia

- Date: 26 June 2022
- Location: El Espinal, Tolima, Colombia
- Type: Structural collapse
- Deaths: 4
- Injuries: 263

On 26 June 2022, a stadium collapsed in El Espinal, Tolima Department, Colombia during a bullfight.

== Background ==
The stadium was hosting a corraleja, which is a bullfighting tradition popular in Colombia. There are no bullfighters in a corraleja – spectators are allowed to enter the ring and engage the bull. On 20 January 1980 during a corraleja, several stands collapsed, killing more than 500 spectators.

== Collapse ==
The collapse occurred at the three-story wooden stand section filled with audience members. There were 800 people sitting in the collapsed section before the accident happened. The stands were overcrowded because there had been no corraleja the prior year due to the COVID-19 pandemic. The stands were built with thin wooden boards and tied together with rope. The collapse occurred during encierro, with one bull escaped into town, running freely before being recaptured.

=== Victims ===
Initially, it was reported that six were killed, with a total of 322 other people receiving treatment at local public and private hospitals. These numbers were later reduced to four fatalities and 263 injured. The dead were two women (Blanca Sandoval, 63 and Rocío Brochero, 51), one man (Fidel Hernández, 53), and one 14-month-old boy. Hernández was killed instantly while the other three died while receiving medical care. Fabio Buitrago, a witness to the collapse, said that he saw "many people crushed under the rubble" of the stands. 14 of the injured were pregnant women and 27 were children. Most of the injured were taken to the San Rafael Hospital in El Espinal.

== Investigation ==
According to Yerson Hernán Oliveros Calderón, one of the organizers of the event, the government of the Tolima Department did not authorize the use of the guadua that they had used in the construction of the stands, so the organizers had to import it from Armenia. Grupo de Ingeniería y Arquitectura determined that the structural failure of the guadua column in audience box 35 caused a larger collapse affecting boxes 33 to 40.

In November 2023, Luis Ernesto García Aranda, who was in charge of the audience boxes, was arrested on four counts of manslaughter for ignoring concerns regarding construction and allowing more people into the seats despite being overcapacity.

== Responses ==
President Iván Duque expressed his solidarity to all of the victims' families and ordered an investigation to the incident. President-elect Gustavo Petro urged a ban on such events, citing that it was not the first time it happened. The Mayor's Office of El Espinal expressed regret for the collapse. The mayor of El Espinal, Juan Carlos Tamayo, claimed that the tragedy was unforeseeable since officials had done all due diligence in inspecting the premises. He also defended the participation of children in the corralejas, stating that he himself takes his minor children to the events and that they are "tradition". He said that engineers employed by the city would be sent to investigate the cause of the collapse.

The mayor of Cali, Jorge Iván Ospina, said that he will ban corralejas and other blood sports involving animals, citing animal rights concerns and safety issues, specifically the collapse in El Espinal.

A three-day period of mourning was declared in El Espinal, and cavalcades and corralejas previously scheduled for four days during the mourning period were canceled.

== See also ==
- List of structural failures and collapses
