= Liliana Angulo Cortés =

Colombian visual artist (1974–2026)

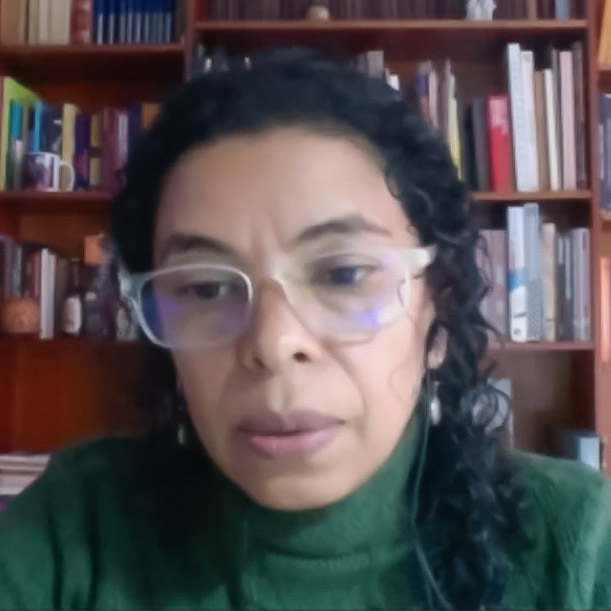
- Cortés in 2024
- Born: Astrid Liliana Angulo Cortés; 1974; Bogotá, Colombia
- Died: 21 February 2026 (aged 51); Bogotá, Colombia
- Occupations: Visual artist, activist, academic

Astrid Liliana Angulo Cortés (1974 – 21 February 2026) was a Colombian visual artist with a degree in sculpture from the National University of Colombia, an MFA from the University of Illinois (Chicago) and a Master’s in Anthropology from the University of Los Andes (Colombia). Through her artistic practice, she uses the lens of gender, race, and identity to explore representations of the black woman in contemporary culture.

== Life and career ==
Angulo Cortés was inclined toward art education ever since she began her secondary studies. As a Professor of Studio Arts and a practising artist, Cortés researched and reflected for over 20 years on the Afro-descendant experience, as well as the lack of debate surrounding the images and stereotypes that have been built around Afro-descendant identity.

She concurrently developed her work as a visual artist, her work as a teacher and also as an advocate for memory and art from the Afro-Colombian community. From 2004 to 2007, she worked as a teacher at the National University of Colombia, and at the Jorge Tadeo Lozano University in Bogotá. She worked as a visual and plastic arts consultant for various cultural foundations. In 2014, she held the position of Secretary of Culture, Recreation and Sports for the city of Bogotá. In 2015, she founded the Afro-Colombian artist collective Agua Turbia. Currently, Liliana Angulo Cortés is the Deputy Director of the Arts of the District Institute of the Arts for Bogotá. She has organized several curatorial endeavors and given numerous lectures at artistic institutions both nationally and internationally.

Cortés died on 21 February 2026 in Bogotá, at the age of 51.

== Artistic work ==
Cortés spent time locating files on the resistance, reparation and the presence of the Afro-descendant population in Colombia in order to account for the power dynamics surrounding the image, territory, race and body of black women. In doing so, she developed a systematic reflection regarding the tensions arising from the intersection of gender and race in Colombian society.

She also used the relationship with others as a collective exercise that opens up a space of performative power linked to the care of oneself and the community. The collective experience is a labour of rewriting memory.

== Exhibitions ==
=== Solo exhibitions ===
- 14 May to 8 June 2018 – Observing Whiteness. CSRPC at the University of Chicago.
- 2009 – Black Presence/Presencia Negra. Gorecki Gallery St John, San Benedict University of Minnesota, USA
- 2007 – Négritude. Alianza Colombo Francesa de Bogotá, Colombia.
- 2003 – Mancha negra. Valenzuela y Klenner arte contemporáneo. Bogotá, Colombia.
- 2000 – Un negro es un negro. Photo exhibit Exposición fotográfica. Instituto municipal para el arte y la cultura. IMAC, Durango, México.

=== Group exhibitions ===
- May 2019 – Museo 360, ¿qué pasó aquí? Antioquia Museum, Medellín, Colombia
- 4 November to 22 December 2017 – Identidad. Résidence croisée France-Colombie Liliana Angulo — Mariangela Aponte Nuñez — Guillaume Chauvin. La Chambre, exhibition and studio space. Strasbourg, France.
- November 2008 to January 2009 – Cali es Cali. 41 Salón Nacional de Artistas de Colombia Santiago de Cali, Colombia.
- November 2006 to January 2007 – Mambo Negrita. IX Bienal del Museo de Arte Moderno de Bogotá, Colombia.
- July–August, 2006 – Viaje sin mapa, imagen y representación afro en el arte contemporáneo colombiano. Casa de Moneda, Bogotá, Colombia.
- 2005 – ¿Se acabó el rollo? Historia de la fotografía en Colombia de 1950-2000. Museo Nacional de Colombia. Bogotá, Colombia.
