= Nel Beltrán Santamaría =

Colombian Roman Catholic bishop (1940–2025)

His Excellency Nel Beltrán Santamaría
- Bishop Emeritus of Sincelejo
- Archdiocese: Cartagena
- Diocese: Sincelejo
- Appointed: April 29, 1992
- Term ended: March 15, 2014
- Predecessor: Héctor Jaramillo Duque
- Successor: José Crispiano Clavijo Méndez

Orders
- Ordination: June 29, 1964
- Consecration: June 6, 1992 by Paolo Romeo

Personal details
- Born: December 24, 1941 San Andrés, Santander, Colombia
- Died: August 12, 2025 (aged 83) Barrancabermeja, Colombia

Nel Hedye Beltrán Santamaría (Spanish: [ˈnel ˈeðje βelˈtɾan santamaˈɾia]; December 24, 1941 – August 12, 2025) was a Colombian prelate and Bishop emeritus of the Diocese of Sincelejo.

== Early life and priesthood ==
Beltrán was born in San Andrés on December 24, 1941. He was ordained a priest on June 29, 1964 in Barrancabermeja after studying Philosophy at the Major Seminary of Pamplona and Theology at the Pontificia Universidad Javeriana in Bogotá, where he obtained a Licentiate in Theology. He continued his studies in Rome where he obtained a Licentiate in Sociology at the Pontifical University of St. Thomas and a Doctorate in Moral Theology at the Pontifical Athenaeum of St. Alphonsus.

In his priestly ministry he held, among other positions, those of parochial vicar of San Vicente de Chucurí, parish priest of Las Granjas and the Cathedral of Barrancabermeja, assistant of the "Cursillos de Cristiandad" Movement, vicar of Pastoral and vicar general of the Diocese of Barrancabermeja, he held the position of director of the National Secretariat of Social Pastoral of the Episcopal Conference of Colombia until April 1992.

On April 29, 1992 Pope John Paul II appointed Beltrán Bishop of Sincelejo, he received his Episcopal Ordination on June 6, 1992, acting as Principal Consecrator Monsignor Paolo Romeo, Apostolic Nuncio in Colombia. The then Archbishop of Cali, Monsignor Pedro Rubiano Sáenz and the Bishop of Barrancabermeja, Juan Francisco Sarasti Jaramillo, C.I.M., acted as co-consecrators.

== Death ==
Beltrán died on August 12, 2025, at the age of 83.

Catholic Church titles
Preceded by Héctor Jaramillo Duque	Bishop of Sincelejo; 1992–2014	Succeeded by José Crispiano Clavijo Méndez
