= Ihor Rybak =

Soviet weightlifter (1934–2005)

- Rybak (center) at the 1956 Olympics

Personal information
- Born: 21 March 1934 Kharkiv, Ukrainian SSR, Soviet Union
- Died: 28 September 2005 (aged 71) Kharkiv, Ukraine

Sport
- Sport: Olympic weightlifting
- Club: Avanhard Kharkiv
Medal record
Representing the Soviet Union
Olympic Games
Gold medal – first place	1956 Melbourne	-67.5 kg
European Weightlifting Championships
Gold medal – first place	1956 Helsinki	-75 kg

Ihor Mykhaylovych Rybak (Ukrainian: Ігор Михайлович Рибак, also spelled Igor Rybak, 21 March 1934 – 28 September 2005) was a Ukrainian weightlifter. He competed for the Soviet Union twice, at the 1956 Summer Olympics and 1956 European Championships. On both occasions he won ahead of Ravil Khabutdinov. Due to the severe competition within the Soviet Union, Rybak never won a national title, and by 1960 was left out of the national team. In retirement he worked in sports medicine.
