= Gabriel Melo Guevara =

Colombian politician (1939–2025)

Member of the Senate of Colombia
- In office 1991–1994

Minister of Economic Development
- In office 13 March 1981 – 7 August 1982
- Preceded by: Andrés Restrepo Londoño
- Succeeded by: Roberto Gerlein

Minister of Communications
- In office 15 January 1980 – 12 March 1981
- Preceded by: José Manuel Arias Carrizosa
- Succeeded by: Antonio Abello Roca

Governor of Cundinamarca
- In office 9 May 1976 – 25 August 1978
- Preceded by: Manuel Leal Angarita
- Succeeded by: Miguel Santamaría Dávila

Associate Justice of the Supreme Court of Justice of Colombia
- In office 1972–1978

Personal details
- Born: 28 August 1939 Bogotá, Colombia
- Died: 2 February 2025 (aged 85) Bogotá, Colombia
- Party: PCC (1950–1990); MSN (1990–1995)
- Education: Pontificia Universidad Javeriana
- Occupation: Journalist, judge

Gabriel Melo Guevara (28 August 1939 – 2 February 2025) was a Colombian judge and politician. A member of the Colombian Conservative Party and subsequently the National Salvation Movement, he served in the Supreme Court of Justice from 1972 to 1978 and was Minister of Communications from 1980 to 1981. From 1981 to 1982, he was Minister of Economic Development and he served as a Senator from 1991 to 1994. He was the political aide to Álvaro Gómez Hurtado during Gómez presidentials campaigns of 1986 and 1990.

Melo was born in Bogotá on 28 August 1939. He died in Bogotá on 2 February 2025, at the age of 85.
