= Víctor Delgado Mallarino =

Colombian police officer (1929–2025)

Víctor Delgado Mallarino (July 26, 1929 – November 15, 2025) was a Colombian police officer.

== Life and career ==
Delgado Mallarino was born in Bogotá on July 26, 1929. He was the first police officer to reach the rank of three-star General. As director general of the National Police, he participated in the operation to retake the Palace of Justice on November 6 and 7, 1985, which had been led by a guerrilla commando of the 19th of April Movement (M-19).

Delgado Mallarino died on November 15, 2025, at the age of 96.
