= Conquering Self-Defense Forces of the Sierra Nevada =

Colombian criminal paramilitary organization

- Autodefensas Conquistadoras de la Sierra Nevada (ACSN)
- Other name: Los Pachenca
- Founded: 2019
- Country: Colombia
- Active regions: Sierra Nevada de Santa Marta
- Conflicts: Colombian conflict

The Conquering Self-Defense Forces of the Sierra Nevada (Autodefensas Conquistadoras de la Sierra Nevada, ACSN) are a Colombian criminal paramilitary organization operating in the Sierra Nevada de Santa Marta region.

== History ==
The Conquering Self-Defense Forces of the Sierra Nevada (ACSN) emerged in 2019 from a reorganization of the Los Pachenca group, which had its origins in the United Self-Defense Forces of Colombia’s (AUC) Tayrona Resistance Block led by Hernan Giraldo.

In 2023, they were a part of a bilateral ceasefire agreement between the federal government and multiple armed groups.

In 2024, the Colombian government under president Gustavo Petro announced that it was launching dialogue with the ACSN as a part of his Total Peace policy; it recognized four of its leaders (Fredy Castillo Carrillo, José Luis Pérez Villanueva, Loryin Emilio Pertuz Ballestas, and Orlando Pérez Orteg) as representatives of the group. In April 2025, the group announced a pause in the dialogue while they were being targeted in a military operation.

On 3 September 2026, under president Abelardo de la Espriella, ACSN leader Nain Andres Pérez Toncel, alias Bendito Menor, was killed during a security operation in Riohacha, La Guajira along with his partner and two other group members. Two weeks later on 21 September, Pérez Villanueva, alias Cholo, identified as the group's second-in-command, was killed in a rural area of Magdalena Department along with twelve other group members.

== Operations ==
The ACSN is involved in extortion and the trafficking of drugs along Colombia's Caribbean coast. They have been involved in clashes with the Clan del Golfo.

== See also ==
- Illegal drug trade in Colombia
