= 2022 Risaralda landslide =

Landslide in Risaralda, Northwest Colombia

- Date: 5 December 2022; 3 years ago
- Location: Risaralda, Colombia; 5.281°N 76.072°W
- Type: Landslide
- Cause: Heavy rains
- Deaths: 33
- Injuries: 4 critically injured

A large landslide occurred in Risaralda Department, Colombia on December 5, 2022.

== Impact ==
At least 33 people were killed and nine others were rescued alive, four of them injured critically. All victims were inside a bus when the landslide buried the vehicle. At least three children were among those killed, according to Colombian President Gustavo Petro. The bus itself had around 25 passengers, and departed from Cali before the landslide.

== See also ==
- Weather of 2022
