= Tan Howe Liang =

Singaporean weightlifter (1933–2024)

Tan Howe Liang PJG
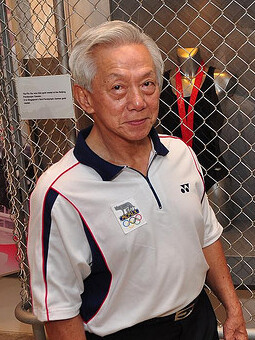
- Tan in 2008

Personal information
- Born: 5 May 1933 Shantou, Guangdong, China
- Died: 3 December 2024 (aged 91) Singapore

Sport
- Country: Singapore

Achievements and titles
- Olympic finals: Silver medallist, (weightlifting, in the class to 67.5 kg); 1960 Summer Olympics
Medal record
Weightlifting
Representing Singapore
Olympic Games
Silver medal – second place	1960 Rome	Lightweight
Commonwealth Games
Gold medal – first place	1958 Cardiff	Lightweight
Gold medal – first place	1962 Perth	Middleweight
Asian Games
Gold medal – first place	1958 Tokyo	Lightweight
Southeast Asian Peninsular Games
Gold medal – first place	1959 Bangkok	Lightweight

Tan Howe Liang, PJG (simplified Chinese: 陈浩亮; traditional Chinese: 陳浩亮; pinyin: Chén Hàoliàng; 5 May 1933 – 3 December 2024) was a Singaporean weightlifter who was the first Singaporean to win an Olympic Games medal. He did so in the 1960 Summer Olympics in Rome where he won the silver medal in the lightweight category. Tan also broke the oldest-standing world record in the lightweight category in the clean and jerk in 1958. He was the only Singaporean Olympic medalist until the 2008 Summer Olympics.

== Early life ==
Tan was born on 5 May 1933, in Swatow, China, where he was the third of eight siblings. When he was four years old, he emigrated with his family to settle in Singapore, where he grew up in Chinatown. Tan's Teochew father died when Tan was 14. Tan left school after his first year at a secondary school.

== Weightlifting career ==
Tan's weightlifting career started when he walked past the World Amusement Park and witnessed his first weightlifting competition and became interested in the sport. After one year of training on his own, Tan, then 20, won national junior and senior championship in the lightweight division in 1953.

Without any financial support, Tan worked as a clerk at Cathay Organisation and also as a mechanic to pay for his training. Despite the hardships, Tan continued his training.

During the 1956 Summer Olympics, in an attempt to lift 241.75 pounds in the press, Tan fainted after lifting up the bar. After he was revived without injuries, he was advised to retire by the team manager, but refused. He went on to lift 220.75 pounds for the snatch and 314 pounds for the clean and jerk to earn ninth place.

In 1958, Tan established a world record with a lift of 347 pounds in the jerk for the lightweight division at the 6th British Empire and Commonwealth Games (now known as the Commonwealth Games), in Cardiff. He also won a gold at the 3rd Asian Games in Tokyo that year. In 1959, Tan won a gold medal at the inaugural Southeast Asian Peninsular Games (now known as the Southeast Asian Games) in Bangkok.

On 8 September 1960, Tan made another attempt at the Olympics in Rome. In the lightweight category (60–67.5 kg) competition held at the Palazzetto dello Sport, the gold medal was won by Russia's Viktor Bushuev by breaking the world record. Tan had to compete with Iraq's Abdul Wahid Aziz for the silver medal. Tan who had one final lift, the clean and jerk, left when he felt pain in his legs. He was advised by the doctors to receive treatment at the Athlete's Village but to do that he would have had to withdraw from the competition and lose the silver medal. Tan refused to go for treatment and continued to compete. Tan lifted a total of 380 kg and won the silver medal.

== Life after the Olympics ==
Tan tried to run a restaurant business but was unsuccessful. He worked as a taxicab driver for a short stint and in 1974 becoming a weightlifting coach. After his retirement from competition, Tan was hired as a gym supervisor by the Singapore Sports Council at the Kallang Family ClubFit in November 1982.

Tan died on 3 December 2024, at the age of 91.

== Honours ==
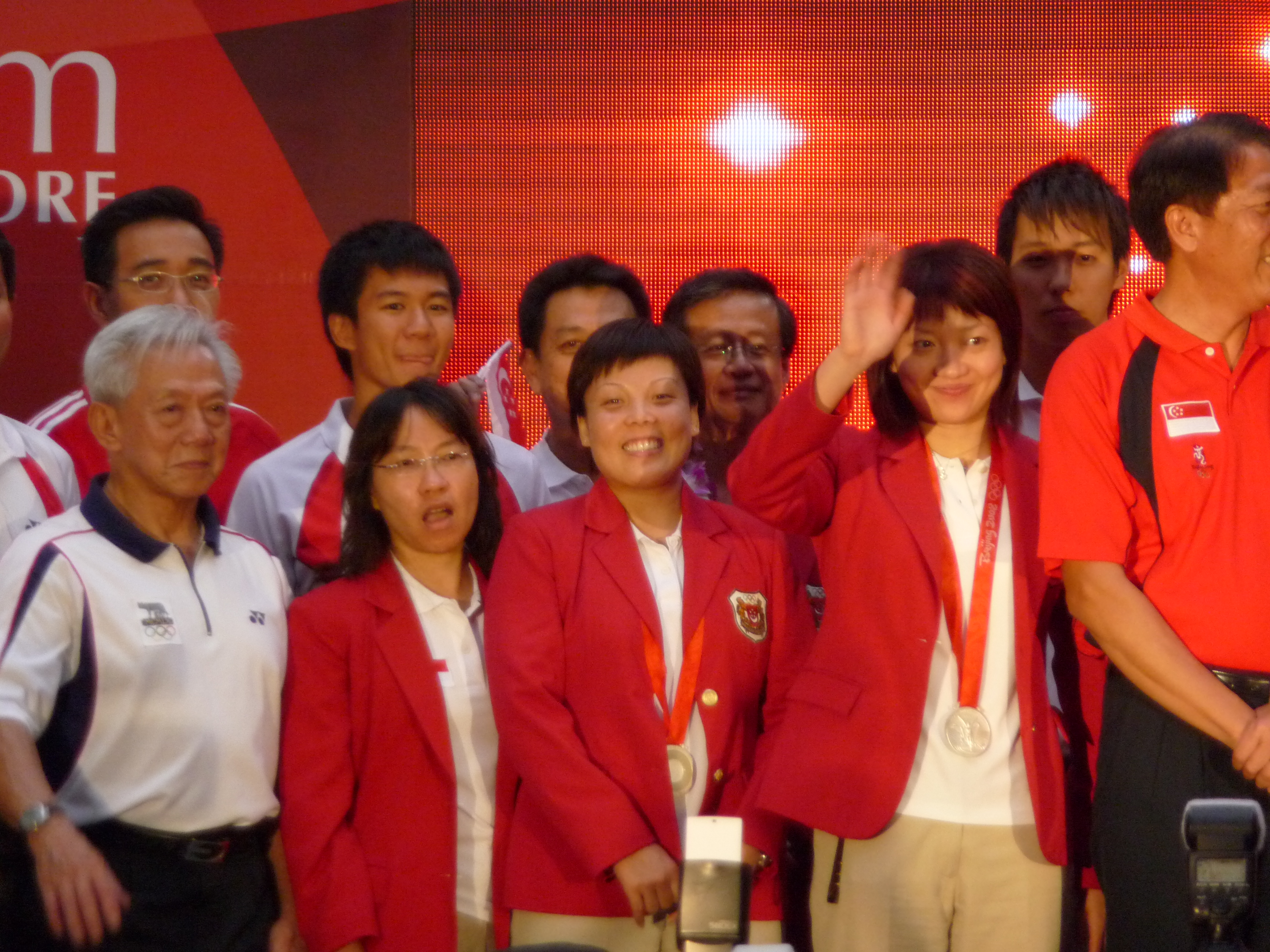
Tan (left) at a ceremony on 25 August 2008 to welcome Team Singapore home from the 2008 Summer Olympics in Beijing

Tan's Olympic medal made him the only Singaporean to have won a medal at all the major international games – the SEAP Games (predecessor of the SEA Games), the Asian Games, the Commonwealth Games, and the Olympic Games for 48 years. He also became the first weightlifter in the world to be awarded the International Weightlifting Federation (national honour) Gold Award in 1984. In Singapore, Tan was the only athlete to be bestowed the Pingat Jasa Gemilang (Meritorious Service Medal) at the National Day awards in 1962.

On 26 June 1996, a commemorative medallion set by the Singapore Mint was launched to celebrate the 1996 Olympic Games at Atlanta. It features Tan on one side of the medallion, showing him getting ready to lift weights. When the image is tilted to a certain angle, the picture would show him having lifted the weights. Izzy, the official mascot of the Atlanta Olympics, is featured as a three-dimensional image on the other side of the medallion.

In 1999, Tan was nominated for the "Spirit of the Century" award. In the same year, he was also nominated for "Singapore's Greatest Athlete" award, but conceded the award to former badminton champion, Wong Peng Soon, who was a four-time winner in the All England Open Badminton Championships in the 1950s. Tan was featured in Time's "Millennium" series on Singapore sporting greats in 1999.

In 2000, McDonald's sponsored Tan's trip to the 2000 Olympic Games in Sydney, where he joined the Singapore contingent and attended the weightlifting competition. McDonald's also donated S$10,000 with the aim to help revive the sport of weightlifting in Singapore. McDonald's also featured a two-minute special television commercial, titled "We Can Do It", featuring Tan's silver medal-winning feat at the 1960 Rome Olympics. The commercial re-enacts the different stages of Tan's life, from childhood to his triumph at the Olympics.

Tan was given the honour of being the flagbearer at the closing ceremony of the National Stadium on 30 June 2007. The leotard and belt which Tan wore during his 10 1/2-hour competition in Rome were put on display in a glass case in the Singapore Sports Council's Sports Museum at the National Stadium.

At the 2008 Summer Olympics, Singapore's table tennis players Feng Tianwei, Li Jiawei, and Wang Yuegu won the silver medal in the women's team category, ending Tan's 48-year status of being the sole Singaporean Olympic medalist. At the 2012 Summer Olympics, Feng's bronze medal in the women's singles table tennis event meant that Tan was no longer the only Singaporean with an individual Olympic medal.

== Achievements ==
Venue	Game	Category	Medal
1958 Cardiff	6th Commonwealth Games	Lightweight 790/358	Gold
1958 Tokyo	3rd Asian Games	67.5 kg (375.0 pts)	Gold
1959 Bangkok	1st SEAP Games	Lightweight 815/369.6	Gold
1960 Rome	17th Olympic Games	Lightweight	Silver
1962 Perth	7th Commonwealth Games	Middleweight 860/390	Gold
