= Killing of María José Estupiñán Sànchez =

Killing of Colombian influencer and model (2003–2025)

María José Estupiñán
- Born: María José Estupiñán Sánchez; 2003; Cúcuta, Santander Department, Colombia
- Died: 15 May 2025 (aged 22); Cúcuta, Santander Department, Colombia
- Cause of death: Gunshot wound
- Burial place: 16 May 2025; Regional Cemetery, Cúcuta
- Occupations: Influencer, model, entrepreneur, student
- Years active: 2022–2025

María José Estupiñán Sánchez, simply known as María José Estupiñán or La Mona (2003 – 15 May 2025) was a Colombian model, digital content creator, entrepreneur, and social media influencer. She became known thanks to her posts on social media, sharing self-care content, beauty products, lifestyle, fashion and beauty tips, owning also digital activities. She was shot and killed outside her home in Cúcuta, Colombia.

Her death has been covered internationally, with public debates and demonstrations raised to denounce her murder and the condition of women in Latin America. Colombian women, feminist associations and others accused the state of negligence and of being involved in Estupiñán's murder, of lack of protection towards her.

== Biography ==
=== Early life and career ===
Estupiñán was originally from Cúcuta, a Colombian city on the border with Venezuela, in Santander Department. She had an elder sister and her father, José, died before her.

She completed her primary and secondary education at La Salle school and Santo Ángel de la Guardia school where she obtained her bachelor's degree. Then, she studied social communication and journalism at Francisco de Paula Santander University, with the aim of becoming a television presenter, and was preparing to start her professional internship at Canal TRO, Colombian broadcaster. She was active in representing the university by promoting its image and study programs through videos and presentations to get other students to enroll.

She began to get noticed on social media thanks to her content about self-care, lifestyle, travels, beauty products, fashion, and empowerment. She worked as a model for a Colombian agency and, as an entrepreneur, she owned three activities, selling products related to gymnastics, footwear and other items of clothing, actively promoting them on social media. She had a large amount of followers on TikTok and was nicknamed "La Mona" by them.

== Personal life ==
Estupiñán was in a relationship with a man until 2018, when she filed a complaint against him alleging abuse, including domestic, psychological, and verbal violence. On 14 May 2025, one day before her death, she appeared in court to hear a ruling that formally recognized her as a victim and ordered her former partner to pay 30 million pesos in compensation.

== Death ==
On 15 May 2025, at the age of 22, Estupiñán was shot and killed outside her home in El Bosque, a residential neighborhood of Cúcuta, by a man posing as a delivery worker. He approached her on the porch and fired multiple shots to her face and chest before fleeing the scene. Security cameras recorded the incident, including the assailant’s escape and the presence of Estupiñán’s mother. An autopsy confirmed that she died instantly from the gunshot wounds.

=== Investigations and reactions ===
After her death, investigations into the alleged femicide were opened. Her ex-boyfriend was put under investigation as a suspect and minister Magda Victoria Acosta Walderos, president of the National Gender Commission of the Judiciary, condemned the crime and expressed her solidarity with Estupiñán's family.

Estupiñán’s death prompted widespread outrage and renewed concern about the situation of women in Colombia. Human Rights Watch issued a statement on the case, while women’s groups and local feminist associations organized demonstrations and tributes in her memory. Critics accused the state of negligence, failing to protect Estupiñán, and inefficiency in ensuring her safety, with some even alleging possible state involvement. The case has been compared to the killing of Valeria Márquez, both for the manner of the attack and for the prominence of the victim on social media.
