= Nikolay Kostylev =

Russian weightlifter (1938–1993)

Personal information
- Born: 4 March 1938
- Died: 7 November 1993 (aged 55)

Sport
- Sport: Weightlifting
Medal record
Representing Soviet Union
World Weightlifting Championships
Gold medal – first place	1955 Munich	Lightweight
European Weightlifting Championships
Gold medal – first place	1955 Munich	Lightweight
Gold medal – first place	1956 Helsinki	Lightweight

Nikolay Grigoryevich Kostylev (Russian: Николай Григорьевич Костылев, 4 March 1938 – 7 November 1993) was a Russian weightlifter who won one world and two European titles in 1955–1956. Between 1953 and 1959 he set eight ratified world records: seven in the snatch and one in the total.
