= El Carmen de Atrato =

Municipality and town in Colombia

Coordinates: 5.88778°N 75.1642°W

- Municipality and town
- Location of the municipality and town of El Carmen de Atrato in the Chocó Department of Colombia.
- Country: Colombia
- Department: Chocó Department

Area
  - Total: 931 km^{2} (359 sq mi)

Population (2015)
  - Total: 13,819
  - Density: 14.8/km^{2} (38.4/sq mi)
- Time zone: UTC-5 (Colombia Standard Time)

El Carmen de Atrato is a municipality and town in the Chocó Department, Colombia.

== Climate ==
El Carmen de Atrato has a subtropical highland climate (Köppen Cfb) which borders a tropical rainforest climate. The town’s high altitude makes its climate far more temperate (similar to that of the Andean Region) than the climate of most of Chocó Department, although it still receives more than twice as much rain as Bogotá.

Climate data for El Carmen de Atrato town
Month	Jan	Feb	Mar	Apr	May	Jun	Jul	Aug	Sep	Oct	Nov	Dec	Year
Mean daily maximum °C (°F)	23.3 (73.9)	23.5 (74.3)	23.8 (74.8)	23.6 (74.5)	23.0 (73.4)	23.2 (73.8)	23.6 (74.5)	23.3 (73.9)	22.8 (73.0)	22.4 (72.3)	22.3 (72.1)	22.5 (72.5)	23.1 (73.6)
Daily mean °C (°F)	18.2 (64.8)	18.4 (65.1)	18.7 (65.7)	18.6 (65.5)	18.4 (65.1)	18.4 (65.1)	18.5 (65.3)	18.2 (64.8)	18.0 (64.4)	17.7 (63.9)	17.7 (63.9)	17.8 (64.0)	18.2 (64.8)
Mean daily minimum °C (°F)	13.1 (55.6)	13.3 (55.9)	13.7 (56.7)	13.7 (56.7)	13.8 (56.8)	13.6 (56.5)	13.4 (56.1)	13.2 (55.8)	13.2 (55.8)	13.1 (55.6)	13.2 (55.8)	13.2 (55.8)	13.4 (56.1)
Average rainfall mm (inches)	122.3 (4.81)	127.0 (5.00)	166.9 (6.57)	216.9 (8.54)	279.7 (11.01)	242.9 (9.56)	253.6 (9.98)	216.0 (8.50)	228.6 (9.00)	261.8 (10.31)	255.2 (10.05)	157.8 (6.21)	2,528.7 (99.54)
Average rainy days (≥ 1 mm)	11	12	14	18	21	18	17	17	18	20	19	14	199
