= Telésforo Pedraza Ortega =

Colombian politician (1945–2023)

Member of the Chamber of Representatives of Colombia for Bogotá
- In office 12 November 2009 – 20 July 2018
- Preceded by: Sandra Rocío Ceballos Arévalo
- In office 11 April 2005 – 20 July 2006
- Preceded by: Jaime Martínez
- In office 20 July 2002 – 31 December 2004
- Succeeded by: Jaime Martínez

Ambassador of Colombia to Netherlands in The Hague
- In office 14 January 1999 – 19 July 2002

Personal details
- Born: 24 July 1945 Tunja, Colombia
- Died: 17 May 2023 (aged 77) Bogotá, Colombia
- Party: Colombian Conservative Party
- Education: Free University of Colombia
- Occupation: Politician, lawyer, diplomat

Telésforo Pedraza Ortega (24 July 1945 – 17 May 2023) was a Colombian politician, diplomat and lawyer.

== Life ==
Born in Tunja, Boyacá, Pedraza studied law at the Free University of Colombia. A Colombian Conservative Party member, Pedraza served as Councilor of Bogotá, Member of the Chamber of Representatives for the same city on five occasions (2002–2004; 2005–2006; 2009–2010; 2010–2014; 2014–2018), Senator and Secretary of Education of Bogotá. He lost the leadership of the Conservative Party list in Bogotá in the 2018 legislative elections, and lost the re-election.

Pedraza was Ambassador to Netherlands and consul in Romania and Sweden.

Pedraza died in Bogotá on 17 May 2023, at the age of 77.
