= Ney López =

Colombian weightlifter (1929–2025)

Personal information
- Full name: José Ney López Benalcázar
- Nationality: Colombian
- Born: 30 September 1929 Palmira, Colombia
- Died: 19 August 2025 (aged 95) Cali, Colombia

Sport
- Sport: Weightlifting

José Ney López Benalcázar (30 September 1929 – 19 August 2025) was a Colombian weightlifter. He competed at the 1956 Summer Olympics and the 1960 Summer Olympics.

López died on 19 August 2025 in Cali, at the age of 95.
