= Henrik Tamraz =

Iranian weightlifter (1935–1996)

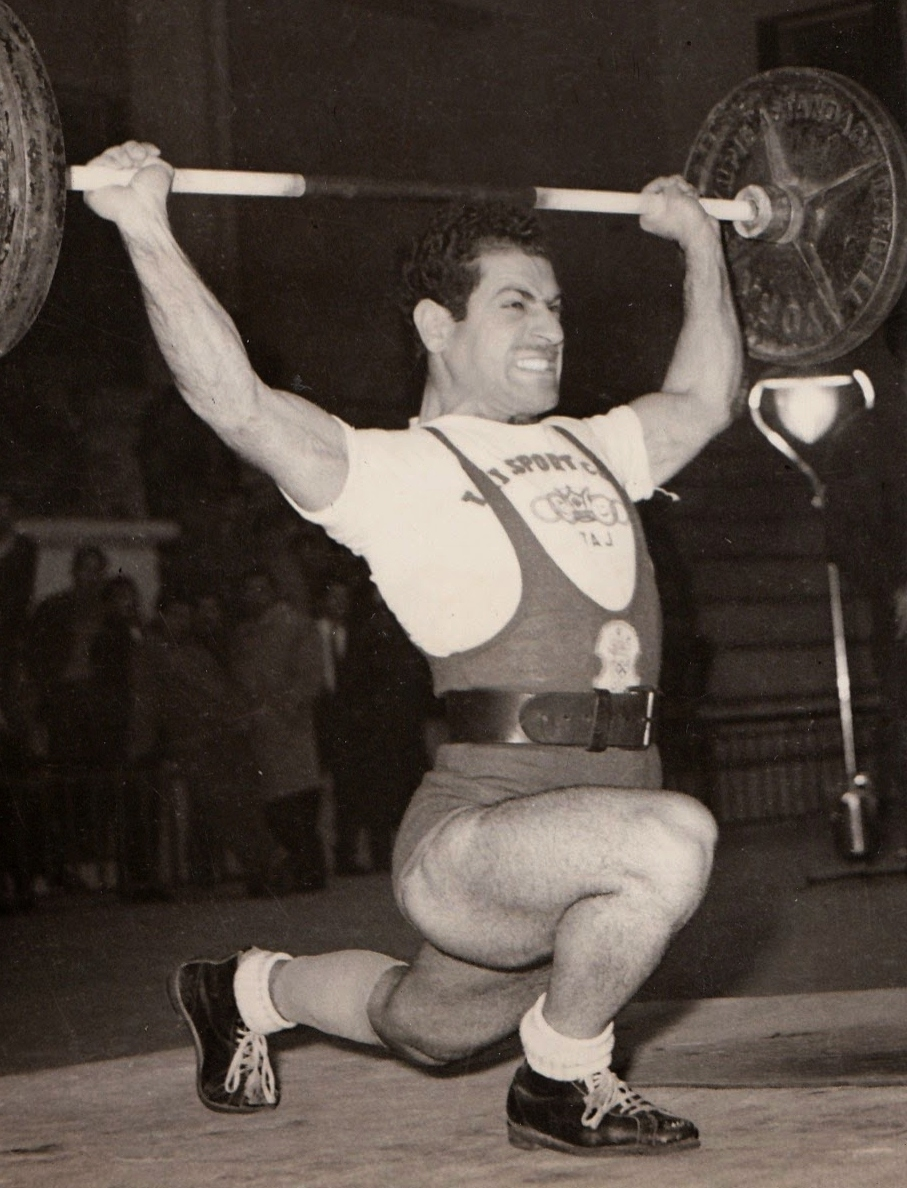

Personal information
- Born: May 28, 1935 Urmia, Iran
- Died: November 19, 1996 (aged 61)
- Height: 165 cm (5 ft 5 in)

Sport
- Sport: Weightlifting
Medal record
Representing Iran
World Championships
Bronze medal – third place	1958 Stockholm	67.5 kg
Asian Games
Bronze medal – third place	1958 Tokyo	67.5 kg

Henrik Tamraz (Persian: هنريک تمرز; May 28, 1935 – November 19, 1996) was an Iranian weightlifter of Assyrian descent. In 1958 he won bronze medals at the World Championships and at the Asian Games. He competed at the 1956 and 1960 Summer Olympics and placed 5th and 14th, respectively. After retiring from competitions he first worked as a weightlifting coach and sports commentator. His trainees included Mohammad Nassiri and Parviz Jalayer.
