= Kenji Onuma =

Japanese weightlifter (born 1931)

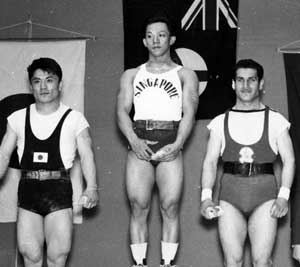
- Onuma (left) at the 1958 Asian Games

Personal information
- Born: 12 March 1931 Osaka Prefecture, Japan
- Height: 162 cm (5 ft 4 in)

Sport
- Sport: Weightlifting
Medal record
Representing Japan
Asian Games
Silver medal – second place	1958 Tokyo	-67.5 kg

Kenji Onuma (Japanese: 大沼 賢治, born 12 March 1931) is a Japanese retired lightweight weightlifter who won a silver medal at the 1958 Asian Games. In that same year, he set an unofficial world record in the clean and jerk. Onuma placed fourth in weightlifting in the 1956 Summer Olympics and competed in weightlifting in the 1960 Summer Olympics.
