= Philippines at the 1991 SEA Games =

Philippines at the 1991 Southeast Asian Games
- IOC code: PHI
- NOC: Philippine Olympic Committee
- Website: www.olympic.ph (in English)

in Manila
- Medals Ranked 2nd: Gold 91 Silver 62 Bronze 84 Total 237

Southeast Asian Games appearances (overview)
- 1977; 1979; 1981; 1983; 1985; 1987; 1989; 1991; 1993; 1995; 1997; 1999; 2001; 2003; 2005; 2007; 2009; 2011; 2013; 2015; 2017; 2019; 2021; 2023; 2025; 2027; 2029

The 16th Southeast Asian Games were held in Manila, Philippines from 24 November - 5 December 1991. This was the second time that the country hosted the biennial regional sporting event. It was officially opened by President Corazon Aquino at the Rizal Memorial track and football field in Manila through a colorful opening ceremony.

== Opening highlights and sidelights ==
The event featured brass bands and students from various institutions, including UST, CEU, and Miriam College, performing in traditional Ati-Atihan costumes. The ceremony included a Philippine Air Force parachute display, where one jumper unfurled the national flag, followed by a parade of athletes from across the region. Approximately 30,000 spectators, including President Corazon Aquino, attended the musical program featuring thousands of student performers.

The welcome song was "One Under an Asian Sun", with its lyrics displayed on a large electronic board. The trio of Lydia de Vega-Mercado, Carlos 'Caloy' Loyzaga and golfer Gerard Cantada put emphasis on the past, present and future. Lydia lit the flame in the cauldron.

== Medalists ==
=== Gold ===
No.	Medal	Name	Sport	Event
1	Gold	Philippines	Basketball	Men's team
2	Gold	Ramoncito Capistrano	Karate	Open Weight
3	Gold	Leo Najera	Swimming	Men's 200m backstroke
4	Gold	Eric Buhain	Swimming	Men's 100m breaststroke
5	Gold	Lee Patrick Concepcion	Swimming	Men's 200m breaststroke
6	Gold	Eric Buhain	Swimming	Men's 100m butterfly
7	Gold	Eric Buhain	Swimming	Men's 200m butterfly
8	Gold	Eric Buhain	Swimming	Men's 200m individual medley
9	Gold	Eric Buhain	Swimming	Men's 400m individual medley
10	Gold	Philippines	Swimming	Men's 4x100m medley relay
11	Gold	Akiko Thomson	Swimming	Women's 100m backstroke
12	Gold	Akiko Thomson	Swimming	Women's 200m backstroke
13	Gold	Felix Barrientos	Tennis	Men's singles
14	Gold	Felix Barrientos; Roland So	Tennis	Men's doubles
15	Gold	Felix Barrientos; Jennifer Saberon	Tennis	Mixed doubles
16	Gold	Ramon Solis	Weightlifting	Men's Weightlifting
17	Gold	Robert Layug Vargas	Taekwondo	Men's sparring Lightweight

=== Silver ===
No.	Medal	Name	Sport	Event
1	Silver	Philippines	Archery	Men's team
2	Silver	Philippines	Archery	Women's team
3	Silver	Leo Najera	Swimming	Men's 100m backstroke
4	Silver	Akiko Thomson	Swimming	Women's 50m freestyle
5	Silver	Akiko Thomson	Swimming	Women's 100m freestyle
6	Silver	Felix Barrientos; Roland So; Sofronio Palahang; Danilo Pila	Tennis	Men's team
7	Silver	Jennifer Saret; Joanna Feria; Francesca Maria La'o; Jennifer Saberon	Tennis	Women's team

=== Bronze ===
No.	Medal	Name	Sport	Event
1	Bronze	Michael Focundo	Archery	Men's individual
2	Bronze	Jennifer Chan	Archery	Women's individual
3	Bronze	Raymond Papa	Swimming	Men's 50m freestyle
4	Bronze	Raymond Papa	Swimming	Men's 100m backstroke
5	Bronze	Lee Patrick Concepcion	Swimming	Men's 100m breaststroke
6	Bronze	Philippines	Swimming	Men's 4x100m freestyle relay
7	Bronze	Philippines	Swimming	Men's 4x200m freestyle relay
8	Bronze	Joan Rae Sanchez	Table Tennis	Women's singles
9	Bronze	Roland So	Tennis	Men's singles
10	Bronze	Jennifer Saret; Jennifer Saberon	Tennis	Women's doubles
11	Bronze	Roland So; Jennifer Saret	Tennis	Mixed doubles
12	Bronze	Philippines	Volleyball	Men's team
13	Bronze	Philippines	Volleyball	Women's team
14	Bronze	Philippines	Water Polo	Men's team

=== Multiple ===
Name	Sport	1st place, gold medalist(s)	2nd place, silver medalist(s)	3rd place, bronze medalist(s)	Total
Eric Buhain	Swimming	5	0	0	5
Felix Barrientos	Tennis	3	1	0	4
Akiko Thomson	Swimming	2	2	0	4
Roland So	Tennis	1	1	2	4
Jennifer Saberon	Tennis	1	1	1	3
Leo Najera	Swimming	1	1	0	2
Lee Partick Concepcion	Swimming	1	0	1	2
Jennifer Saret	Tennis	0	1	2	3

=== Demonstration sport ===
Medals earned in a Demonstration Sport is not counted on the medal haul.

Sport	Gold	Silver	Bronze	Total
Arnis	10	3	1	14
Totals (1 entries)	10	3	1	14

== Medal summary ==
=== By sports ===
Sport	Gold	Silver	Bronze	Total
Shooting	10	5	10	25
Wushu	10	3	8	21
Swimming	9	4	5	18
Athletics	8	6	6	20
Taekwondo	8	2	5	15
Boxing	8	2	2	12
Karatedo	5	4	6	15
Bowling	4	9	2	15
Billiards and snooker	4	2	0	6
Tennis	4	0	3	7
Cycling	3	2	0	5
Gymnastics	3	1	6	10
Golf	3	0	1	4
Judo	2	4	4	10
Yachting/Sailing	2	1	2	5
Softball	2	0	0	2
Bodybuilding	1	4	0	5
Fencing	1	3	3	7
Weightlifting	1	2	8	11
Basketball	1	0	0	1
Archery	0	2	2	4
Squash	0	0	3	3
Volleyball	0	0	2	2
Badminton	0	0	1	1
Table tennis	0	0	1	1
Traditional Boat Race	0	0	1	1
Totals (26 entries)	89	56	81	226

== Gold medalists ==
- In Swimming, Eric Buhain garnered a record six golds to emerge the biennial meet's most bemedalled athlete. Akiko Thomson, losing one gold on a finishing touch technicality, settled for two record-smashing golds.
- Boxing surpassed its target, drawing eight golds from pinweight Mansueto Velasco Jr, light flyweight Elias Recaido Jr, bantamweight Roberto Jalnaiz, featherweight Julito Lopez, lightweight Ronald Chavez, light welterweight Arlo Chavez, welterweight Victor Vicera and light heavyweight Raymundo Suico.
- Bea Lucero enshrined herself in the record book when she ruled the bantamweight division in taekwondo, becoming the meet's first athlete to triumph in two different sports.
- Lydia de Vega-Mercado regain her fastest woman tag, she topped the 100-meter dash with a time of 11.44 seconds at the expense of new track sensation Goldivasamy Shanti of Malaysia and Elma Muros. She failed to repeat over Shanti in the 200m and consoled herself with a silver finish.
- The record-setting triumph of Elma Muros in the 100m hurdles and her epic victory in the long jump, the first woman to rule the event four times in a row, paved the way for seven golds in athletics - the most for Filipinos in the event since 1987.
- Tennis player Felix Barrientos, the top Filipino netter in his first SEAG stint, won the individual gold and figuring in the doubles and mixed doubles finals with Roland So and Jennifer Saberon.
- Golfer Mary Grace Estuesta reaffirmed her billing as the region's best amateur golfer when she kept her individual title and powered the Philippines to the team crown.
- The Philippine men's national basketball team regain the cage supremacy, defeating Thailand, 77–72, in front of a crowd of 20,000 at the close of basketball competitions at the Araneta Coliseum.
