= Thailand at the 1992 Summer Olympics =

- IOC code: THA
- NOC: National Olympic Committee of Thailand

in Barcelona
- Competitors: 46 (23 men and 23 women) in 9 sports
- Medals Ranked 54th: Gold 0 Silver 0 Bronze 1 Total 1

Summer Olympics appearances (overview)
- 1952; 1956; 1960; 1964; 1968; 1972; 1976; 1980; 1984; 1988; 1992; 1996; 2000; 2004; 2008; 2012; 2016; 2020; 2024

Thailand competed at the 1992 Summer Olympics in Barcelona, Spain.

== Medalists ==
| Medal | Name | Sport | Event | Date |
|---|---|---|---|---|
| Bronze | Arkhom Chenglai | Boxing | Welterweight | 8 August |

== Competitors ==
The following is the list of number of competitors in the Games.

| Sport | Men | Women | Total |
|---|---|---|---|
| Athletics | 9 | 9 | 18 |
| Badminton | 4 | 4 | 8 |
| Boxing | 6 | – | 6 |
| Judo | 0 | 2 | 2 |
| Sailing | 1 | 1 | 2 |
| Shooting | 1 | 1 | 2 |
| Swimming | 1 | 4 | 5 |
| Tennis | 0 | 2 | 2 |
| Weightlifting | 1 | – | 1 |
| Total | 23 | 23 | 46 |

== Results by event ==
=== Athletics ===
Men's 100m metres

- Visut Watanasin

- Heat — 10.72 (→ did not advance)

Men's 200 metres

- Seaksarn Boonrat

Men's 400 metres

- Aktawat Sakoolchan

Men's 4 × 100 m Relay

- Kriengkrai Narom, Seaksarn Boonrat, Niti Piyapan, and Visut Watanasin

Men's 4 × 400 m Relay

- Athiaporn Koonjartong, Yuthana Thonglek, Sarapong Kumsup, and Aktawat Sakoolchan

- Heat — 3:08.00 (→ did not advance)

Men's 400m Hurdles

- Chanond Kenchan

- Heat — 50.60 (→ did not advance)

Women's 100 metres

- Ratjai Sripet

Women's 200 metres

- Nednapa Chommuak

Women's 400 metres

- Noodang Phimphoo

Women's 4 × 100 m Relay

- Nednapa Chommuak, Reawadee Srithoa, Ratjai Sripet, and Pornpim Srisurat

Women's 4 × 400 m Relay

- Saleerat Srimek, Sukanya Sang-Nguen, Srirat Chimrak, and Noodang Phimphoo

Women's 800 metres

- Sukanya Sang-Ngeun

- Heat — 2:09.94 (→ did not advance)

Women's 400m Hurdles

- Reawadee Srithoa

- Heat — 58.80 (→ did not advance)

Women's High Jump

- Jaruwan Jenjudkarn

- Qualification — 1.75 m (→ did not advance)

=== Badminton ===
Men

| Athlete | Event | Round of 64 | Round of 32 | Round of 16 | Quarterfinals | Semifinals | Final | Rank |
| Athlete | Event | Opposition Score | Opposition Score | Opposition Score | Opposition Score | Opposition Score | Opposition Score | Rank |
|---|---|---|---|---|---|---|---|---|
| Teeranun Chiangta | Singles | Broddi Kristjánsson (ISL); W(15-2,15-12) | Chris Jogis (USA); W(11-15,15-3,15-3) | Hermawan Susanto (INA); L(7-15,8-15) | Did not advance | | | |
| Sompol Kukasemkij | Singles | Anders Nielsen (GBR); W(16-18,15-12,17-16) | Alan Budikusuma (INA); L(15-11,15-2) | Did not advance | | | | |
| Siripong Siripul; Pramote Teerawiwatana | Doubles | Bye | Jan-Eric Antonsson; Stellan Österberg (SWE); W (18-15,15-5) | Li Yongbo; Tian Bingyi (CHN); L (15-9,8-15,8-15) | Did not advance | | | |

Women

| Athlete | Event | Round of 64 | Round of 32 | Round of 16 | Quarterfinals | Semifinals | Final | Rank |
| Athlete | Event | Opposition Score | Opposition Score | Opposition Score | Opposition Score | Opposition Score | Opposition Score | Rank |
|---|---|---|---|---|---|---|---|---|
| Somharuthai Jaroensiri | Singles | Joy Kitzmiller (USA); W(11-3,11-0) | Christine Magnusson (SWE); W(8-11,12-9,11-4) | Pernille Nedergaard (DEN); W(5-11,11-6,12-10) | Susi Susanti (INA); L(6-11,1-11) | Did not advance | | |
| Pornsawan Plungwech | Singles | Viktoria Hristova (BUL); W(11-3,12-9) | Rhona Robertson (NZL); W(12-9,2-11,12-9) | Sarwendah Kusumawardhani (INA); L(4-11,2-11) | Did not advance | | | |
| Ladawan Mulasartsatorn; Piyathip Sansaniyakulvilai | Doubles | Bye | Martine de Souza; Vandanah Seesurun (MRI); W (18-15,15-5) | Gil Young Ah; Shim Eun-jung (KOR); L (8-15,6-15) | Did not advance | | | |

=== Boxing ===
| Athlete | Event | First round | Second round | Quarterfinals | Semifinals | Final | |
| Athlete | Event | Opposition Result | Opposition Result | Opposition Result | Opposition Result | Opposition Result | Rank |
|---|---|---|---|---|---|---|---|
| Pramuansak Phosuwan | Men's Light Flyweight | Hines (JAM); W RSC–2 | Quast (GER); L 2–11 | Did not advance | | | |
| Vichai Khadpo | Men's Flyweight | Loch (GER); L RSCI–2 | Did not advance | | | | |
| Chatree Suwanyod | Men's Bantamweight | Antonov (EUN); W 11–9 | Sabo (NGR); L 7–16 | Did not advance | | | |
| Somluck Kamsing | Men's Featherweight | Strange (CAN); W 6–4 | Reyes (ESP); L 15–24 | Did not advance | | | |
| Arkhom Chenglai | Men's Welterweight | Khateri (IRI); W 13–7 | Odore (KEN); W 13–10 | Karpaciauskas (LTU); W 9–6 | Carruth (IRL); L 4–11 | Did not advance | 3rd place, bronze medalist(s) |
| Chalit Boonsingkarn | Men's Light Middleweight | Franca (BRA); W 16–2 | Delibaş (NED); L RSCI–2 | Did not advance | | | |

=== Judo ===
Women's Lightweight

- Prateep Pinitwong

Women's Heavyweight

- Supatra Yompakdee

=== Sailing ===
Men's Sailboard (Lechner A-390)

- Saard Panyawan

- Final ranking — 241.0 points (→ 26th place)

Women's Sailboard (Lechner A-390)

- Amara Wichithong

- Final ranking — 215.0 points (→ 20th place)

=== Shooting ===
Men's Air Rifle (10 metres)

- Samarn Jongsuk

Women's Sporting Pistol (25 metres)

- Rampai Yamfang-Sriyai

=== Swimming ===
Men's 400m Freestyle

- Ratapong Sirisanont

- Heat — 4:07.95 (→ did not advance, 39th place)

Men's 1500m Freestyle

- Ratapong Sirisanont

- Heat — 16:08.02 (→ did not advance, 27th place)

Men's 200m Individual Medley

- Ratapong Sirisanont

- Heat — 2:11.02 (→ did not advance, 39th place)

Men's 400m Individual Medley

- Ratapong Sirisanont

- Heat — 4:37.95 (→ did not advance, 39th place)

Women's 50m Freestyle

- Ratiporn Wong

- Heat — 28.42 (→ did not advance, 44th place)

Women's 100m Freestyle

- Ratiporn Wong

- Heat — 1:00.85 (→ did not advance, 43rd place)

Women's 400m Freestyle

- Thanya Sridama

- Heat — 4:29.64 (→ did not advance, 27th place)

Women's 800m Freestyle

- Thanya Sridama

- Heat — 9:10.58 (→ did not advance, 23rd place)

Women's 200m Backstroke

- Praphalsai Minpraphal

- Heat — 2:26.32 (→ did not advance, 42nd place)

Women's 100m Breaststroke

- Sornsawan Phuvichit

- Heat — 1:14.69 (→ did not advance, 31st place)

Women's 200m Breaststroke

- Sornsawan Phuvichit

- Heat — 2:41.20 (→ did not advance, 30th place)

Women's 100m Butterfly

- Praphalsai Minpraphal

- Heat — 1:04.28 (→ did not advance, 37th place)

Women's 200m Butterfly

- Praphalsai Minpraphal

- Heat — 2:20.48 (→ did not advance, 25th place)

Women's 200m Individual Medley

- Praphalsai Minpraphal

- Heat — 2:23.24 (→ did not advance, 30th place)

Women's 400m Individual Medley

- Praphalsai Minpraphal

- Heat — 5:04.95 (→ did not advance, 28th place)

=== Tennis ===
Women's doubles

- Suvimol Duangchan and Benjamas Sangaram

=== Weightlifting ===
Men's Light-Heavyweight

- Prasert Sumpradit
