= Aquatics at the 1993 SEA Games =

- Venue: Toa Payoh Swimming Complex
- Dates: 13–17 June 1993

Aquatics at the 1993 Southeast Asian Games included swimming, diving and water polo events. The three sports of aquatics were held at Toa Payoh Aquatics Center in Singapore. Aquatics events was held between 13 June to 17 June.

== Medal winners ==
=== Swimming ===
Men's events

Event	Gold		Silver		Bronze	
50 m freestyle	(Singapore) Ang Peng Siong	23.67	(Indonesia) Richard Sam Bera	23.73	(Indonesia) Wisnu Wardhana	24.00
100 m freestyle	(Indonesia) Wisnu Wardhana	51.31 GR	(Indonesia) Richard Sam Bera	52.55	(Thailand) Padhanaseth Changkasiri	53.27
200 m freestyle	(Indonesia) Richard Sam Bera	1:54.86 GR	(Indonesia) Wisnu Wardhana	1:55.71	(Singapore) Kenneth Yeo	1:55.73
400 m freestyle	(Malaysia) Jeffrey Ong	4:00.42	(Thailand) Ratapong Sirisanont	4:00.71	(Thailand) Pawin Kohvathana	4:03.06
1500 m freestyle	(Malaysia) Jeffrey Ong	15:56.48	(Thailand) Pawin Kohvathana	16:06.99	(Thailand) Ratapong Sirisanont	16:28.99
100 m backstroke	(Philippines) Raymond Papa	58.45	(Philippines) Leo Najera	59.53	(Indonesia) Felix Sutanto	59.95
200 m backstroke	(Philippines) Raymond Papa	2:03.73 GR	(Singapore) Gerald Koh	2:09.69	(Indonesia) Felix Sutanto	2:10.27
100 m breaststroke	(Indonesia) Wirmandi Sugriat	1:05.53 GR	(Philippines) Eric Buhain	1:06.12	(Philippines) Lee Patrick Concepcion	1:06.56
200 m breaststroke	(Thailand) Ratapong Sirisanont	2:20.10 GR	(Indonesia) Wirmandi Sugriat	2:22.70	(Singapore) Desmond Koh Mun Kit	2:24.01
100 m butterfly	(Philippines) Eric Buhain	56.62	(Indonesia) Wisnu Wardhana	56.63	(Thailand) Niti Intharapichai	57.68
200 m butterfly	(Thailand) Niti Intharapichai	2:04.68	(Indonesia) Vidi Lukman Korompis	2:05.21	(Singapore) Desmond Koh Mun Kit	2:07.11
200 m individual medley	(Thailand) Ratapong Sirisanont	2:06.90	(Singapore) Desmond Koh Mun Kit	2:08.98	(Indonesia) Albert Sutanto	2:10.84
400 m individual medley	(Thailand) Ratapong Sirisanont	4:29.74 GR	(Singapore) Desmond Koh Mun Kit	4:31.83	(Malaysia) Jeffrey Ong	4:38.65
4 × 100 m freestyle relay	Indonesia	3:30.66 GR	Thailand	3:33.94	Singapore	3:36.94
4 × 200 m freestyle relay	Indonesia	7:46.65 GR	Thailand	7:49.56	Singapore	7:58.35
4 × 100 m medley relay	Indonesia	3:52.24 GR	Philippines	3:53.54	Thailand	3:55.48

Women's events

Event	Gold		Silver		Bronze	
50 m freestyle	(Singapore) Joscelin Yeo Wei Ling	26.93 GR	(Thailand) Thanyaluk Sakulkong	27.43	(Philippines) Mary Joy Ong	27.78
100 m freestyle	(Singapore) Joscelin Yeo Wei Ling	57.58 GR	(Indonesia) Meitri Widya Pangestika	59.42	(Singapore) Eadeline Lim	59.78
200 m freestyle	(Singapore) Joscelin Yeo Wei Ling	2:06.03	(Indonesia) Meitri Widya Pangestika	2:07.52	(Thailand) Praphalsai Minpraphal	2:08.60
400 m freestyle	(Thailand) Ravee Inporn Udom	4:25.55	(Singapore) May Ooi	4:31.02	(Thailand) Praphalsai Minpraphal	4:31.48
800 m freestyle	(Thailand) Ravee Inporn Udom	9:05.15	(Thailand) Thanya Sridama	9:12.06	(Singapore) May Ooi	9:16.92
100 m backstroke	(Philippines) Akiko Thomson	1:04.86 GR	(Thailand) Praphalsai Minpraphal	1:05.33	(Indonesia) Chintya Putrianda	1:06.30
200 m backstroke	(Philippines) Akiko Thomson	2:16.76 GR	(Thailand) Praphalsai Minpraphal	2:19.20	(Indonesia) Elsa Manora Nasution	2:22.99
100 m breaststroke	(Singapore) Joscelin Yeo Wei Ling	1:12.04 GR	(Thailand) Sornsawan Phuvichit	1:13.02	(Indonesia) Rita Mariani	1:14.11
200 m breaststroke	(Singapore) Joscelin Yeo Wei Ling	2:34.87 GR	(Thailand) Sornsawan Phuvichit	2:37.21	(Indonesia) Rita Mariani	2:38.04
100 m butterfly	(Singapore) Joscelin Yeo Wei Ling	1:02.22 GR	(Singapore) May Ooi	1:02.66	(Indonesia) Elsa Manora Nasution	1:03.80
200 m butterfly	(Singapore) May Ooi	2:18.45	(Thailand) Praphalsai Minpraphal	2:18.98	(Indonesia) Susanti Wangsawiguna	2:20.25
200 m individual medley	(Singapore) Joscelin Yeo Wei Ling	2:17.48 GR	(Singapore) May Ooi	2:18.32	(Thailand) Praphalsai Minpraphal	2:23.21
400 m individual medley	(Singapore) May Ooi	4:58.24 GR	(Singapore) Joscelin Yeo Wei Ling	4:58.95	(Indonesia) Elsa Manora Nasution	5:03.48
4 × 100 m freestyle relay	Singapore	3:56.92 GR	Indonesia	4:00.94	Thailand	4:01.82
4 × 100 m medley relay	Singapore	4:20.30	Indonesia	4:22.96	Thailand	4:23.17

=== Diving ===
Event	Gold		Silver		Bronze	
Men's 3 m springboard	(Indonesia) Temmy Kusuma Wijayanto	575.55	(Thailand) Somchai Ongkasing	558.15	(Indonesia) Kristedi Permana	557.30
Men's 10 m platform	(Thailand) Suchart Pichi	510.20	(Thailand) Prakong Ninjinda	493.00	(Indonesia) Bahriansyah	490.00
Women's 3 m springboard	(Indonesia) Nani Suryani Wulansari	484.45	(Thailand) Srimoung Jidapone	448.55	(Indonesia) Sri Retno Andiani	448.30
Women's 10 m platform	(Thailand) Saowanee Chakwattana	366.05	(Indonesia) Dwi Mariastuti Setiowati	347.80	(Indonesia) Wachyuni Sulistioningrum	331.15

=== Water polo ===
Event	Gold	Silver	Bronze
Men's	Singapore	Philippines	Indonesia
