= Philippines at the 1989 SEA Games =

Philippines at the 1989 Southeast Asian Games
- IOC code: PHI
- NOC: Philippine Olympic Committee
- Website: www.olympic.ph (in English)

in Kuala Lumpur
- Medals Ranked 5th: Gold 26 Silver 37 Bronze 64 Total 127

Southeast Asian Games appearances (overview)
- 1977; 1979; 1981; 1983; 1985; 1987; 1989; 1991; 1993; 1995; 1997; 1999; 2001; 2003; 2005; 2007; 2009; 2011; 2013; 2015; 2017; 2019; 2021; 2023; 2025; 2027; 2029

The Philippines participated at the 15th Southeast Asian Games held in Kuala Lumpur, Malaysia from 20–31 August 1989.

== SEA Games performance ==
Swimmer Eric Buhain won three gold medals in his events, all in record times, to become the best performer among close to 3,000 peers that represented nine other Southeast Asian neighbors. Buhain's feat served as the saving grace in the otherwise mediocre participation of the Philippines in the biennial meet. 15-year old swimming star Akiko Thomson and Buhain's teammate in the swimming squad, brought home three gold medals, with record-breaking times of both the national and SEA Games marks. Elma Muros, tagged to win at least four gold medals, received only two following a leg injury, including the gold in long jump, surpassing the Asian Games standard, to become the only other athlete in the field, outside of Buhain, to better an Asian record.

The results of the 26 gold medals harvest was the worst finish of any Philippine delegation to the SEA Games. It came too short of an earlier projection of 59 gold medals. Many dubbed the Philippine participation as a debacle or a disaster as cries of resignation for sports leaders were heard.

== Medalists ==
=== Gold ===
No.	Medal	Name	Sport	Event
1	Gold	Eric Buhain	Swimming	Men's 200m butterfly
2	Gold	Eric Buhain	Swimming	Men's 200m individual medley
3	Gold	Eric Buhain	Swimming	Men's 400m individual medley
4	Gold	Akiko Thomson	Swimming	Women's 50m freestyle
5	Gold	Akiko Thomson	Swimming	Women's 100m freestyle
6	Gold	Akiko Thomson	Swimming	Women's 100m backstroke
7	Gold	Ramon Solis	Weightlifting	Men's Weightlifting

=== Silver ===
No.	Medal	Name	Sport	Event
1	Silver	Philippines	Swimming	Men's team
2	Silver	Martin Palacios	Swimming	Men's 1500m freestyle
3	Silver	Eric Buhain	Swimming	Men's 100m butterfly
4	Silver	Philippines	Swimming	Men's 4x100m medley relay
5	Silver	Akiko Thomson	Swimming	Women's 200m backstroke
6	Silver	Andres Battad; Julio Carluen; Danilo Pila; Rod Rafael	Tennis	Men's team
7	Silver	Robert Layug Vargas	Taekwondo	Men's sparring Lightweight

=== Bronze ===
No.	Medal	Name	Sport	Event
1	Bronze	Eric Buhain	Swimming	Men's 200m freestyle
2	Bronze	Martin Palacios	Swimming	Men's 400m freestyle
3	Bronze	Philippines	Swimming	Men's 4x100m freestyle relay
4	Bronze	Philippines	Swimming	Men's 4x100m medley relay
5	Bronze	Nina Castillejo; Sarah Castillejo; Jennifer Saret; Dorothy Jan Suarez	Tennis	Women's team

=== Multiple ===
Name	Sport	1st place, gold medalist(s)	2nd place, silver medalist(s)	3rd place, bronze medalist(s)	Total
Eric Buhain	Swimming	3	1	1	5
Akiko Thomson	Swimming	3	1	0	4
Martin Palacios	Swimming	0	1	1	2

== Medal summary ==
=== By sports ===
Sport	Gold	Silver	Bronze	Total
Swimming	6	4	4	14
Athletics	4	7	6	17
Shooting	3	5	12	20
Boxing	3	2	4	9
Bowling	3	1	1	5
Weightlifting	2	1	4	7
Karate	2	1	3	6
Golf	2	0	1	3
Judo	1	0	4	5
Gymnastics	0	5	2	7
Cycling	0	3	6	9
Taekwondo	0	3	5	8
Archery	0	1	2	3
Tennis	0	1	1	2
Basketball	0	1	0	1
Bodybuilding	0	0	4	4
Fencing	0	0	4	4
Sailing	0	0	1	1
Totals (18 entries)	26	35	64	125
