= May Ooi =

Singaporean swimmer (born 1976)

Personal information
- Full name: Ooi Yu Fen
- Born: 24 June 1976 (age 50)

Sport
- Sport: Swimming
Medal record
Representing Singapore
SEA Games
Gold medal – first place	1993 Singapore	200m butterfly
Gold medal – first place	1993 Singapore	400m individual medley
Silver medal – second place	1993 Singapore	400m freestyle
Silver medal – second place	1993 Singapore	100m butterfly
Silver medal – second place	1993 Singapore	200m individual medley
Silver medal – second place	1995 Chiang Mai	4x100m freestyle relay
Silver medal – second place	1995 Chiang Mai	4x100m medley relay
Silver medal – second place	1997 Jakarta	200m breaststroke
Bronze medal – third place	1989 Kuala Lumpur	200m breaststroke
Bronze medal – third place	1989 Kuala Lumpur	200m individual medley
Bronze medal – third place	1991 Manila	100m butterfly
Bronze medal – third place	1993 Singapore	800m freestyle
Bronze medal – third place	1997 Jakarta	200m individual medley

May Ooi Yu Fen (Ooi Yu Fen, born 24 June 1976) is a retired Singaporean butterfly, freestyle and medley swimmer. She competed in seven events at the 1992 Summer Olympics. She attended college at the University of Nevada, Reno from 1993 to 1997 and was a pre-med major. After her swimming career she became a MMA fighter.
