= Desmond Koh =

Singaporean swimmer (born 1973)

Personal information
- Born: May 19, 1973 (age 53)

Sport
- Sport: Swimming
Medal record
Representing Singapore
SEA Games
Silver medal – second place	1989 Kuala Lumpur	400m individual medley
Silver medal – second place	1991 Manila	200m backstroke
Silver medal – second place	1991 Manila	200m individual medley
Silver medal – second place	1993 Singapore	200m individual medley
Silver medal – second place	1993 Singapore	400m individual medley
Silver medal – second place	1995 Chiang Mai	100m backstroke
Silver medal – second place	1995 Chiang Mai	200m individual medley
Silver medal – second place	1995 Chiang Mai	400m individual medley
Silver medal – second place	1995 Chiang Mai	4x200m freestyle relay
Bronze medal – third place	1989 Kuala Lumpur	1500m freestyle
Bronze medal – third place	1989 Kuala Lumpur	200m butterfly
Bronze medal – third place	1991 Manila	400m individual medley
Bronze medal – third place	1993 Singapore	200m breaststroke
Bronze medal – third place	1993 Singapore	200m butterfly
Bronze medal – third place	1995 Chiang Mai	4x100m medley relay

Desmond Koh Mun Kit (born 19 May 1973) is a former competitive swimmer from Singapore. He has represented the nation in numerous international competitions over more than 10 years including 5 years as National Captain.

== Swimming career ==
Koh represented Singapore in three Olympics (1988, 1992, 1996), three Asian Games (1990, 1994, 1998), one Commonwealth Games (1998), one World Championships (1991), and five Southeast Asian Games (1987, 1989, 1991, 1993, 1995).

Koh had four national records, including:

- 200m Breaststroke - 2:21.87, 29 July 1992
- 400m Individual Medley - 4:28.95, 27 July 1992

== Business career ==
Koh is the Managing Director at an international private bank and his team serves private families and family offices in Southeast Asia. He leads a sustainability task force at the bank and runs "ConsciousCircle", a community of asset and wealth owners.

Koh sits on the Boards of several non-profit entities in Singapore and the USA, focused on education and health.

== Education ==
Koh graduated from the University of Southern California with a degree in Electrical Engineering and was awarded a Rhodes Scholarship to study at Oxford where he obtained an MPhil in Management Studies (Finance and Economics).

== Personal life ==
Koh's younger brother, Gerald, also represented Singapore at the Olympics.

Koh married Nadya Hutagalung, an Indonesian-Australian model and actress.
