= Aquatics at the 1989 SEA Games =

- Venue: Bandar Tun Razak Aquatic Center
- Dates: 22 - 27 August 1989

Aquatics at the 1989 Southeast Asian Games included swimming, diving and water polo events. The three sports of aquatics were held in Kuala Lumpur, Malaysia. Aquatics events was held between 22 August to 27 August at Bandar Tun Razak Aquatic Center.

== Medal winners ==
=== Swimming ===
Men's events

Event	Gold		Silver		Bronze	
50 m freestyle	(Singapore) Ang Peng Siong	23.27	(Indonesia) Richard Sam Bera	24.46	Shared silver	
50 m freestyle	(Singapore) Ang Peng Siong	23.27	(Singapore) Harold Gan	24.46	Shared silver	
100 m freestyle	(Indonesia) Richard Sam Bera	52.19	(Singapore) Ang Peng Siong	52.53	(Indonesia) Mustamsikin	54.96
200 m freestyle	(Singapore) David Lim	1:55.93	(Singapore) Oon Jin Gee	1:56.34	(Philippines) Eric Buhain	1:56.62
400 m freestyle	(Malaysia) Jeffrey Ong	4:03.25	(Indonesia) Richard Sam Bera	4:05.40	(Philippines) Martin Palacios	4:10.25
1500 m freestyle	(Malaysia) Jeffrey Ong	15:56.23	(Philippines) Martin Palacios	16:56.28	(Singapore) Desmond Koh	17:22.91
100 m backstroke	(Singapore) David Lim	58.87	(Singapore) Irving Ng	1:02.20	(Thailand) Nopporn Chaoprasert	1:02.80
200 m backstroke	(Singapore) David Lim	2:09.85	(Singapore) Tan V Meng	2:13.15	(Myanmar) Maung Maung Win	2:17.58
100 m breaststroke	(Singapore) Ng Yue Meng	1:05.28	(Indonesia) Wirmandi Sugriat	1:05.48	(Malaysia) Lee Chee Keen	1:07.01
200 m breaststroke	(Indonesia) Wirmandi Sugriat	2:23.82	(Malaysia) Lee Chee Keen	2:24.32	(Indonesia) Tjatur Sugiarto	2:25.72
100 m butterfly	(Singapore) Ang Peng Siong	56.00	(Philippines) Eric Buhain	56.41	(Indonesia) Mustamsikin	57.01
200 m butterfly	(Philippines) Eric Buhain	2:04.02	(Singapore) Tan V Meng	2:06.60	(Singapore) Desmond Koh	2:07.69
200 m individual medley	(Philippines) Eric Buhain	2:06.94	(Singapore) David Lim	2:10.77	(Indonesia) Wirmandi Sugriat	2:11.85
400 m individual medley	(Philippines) Eric Buhain	4:35.35	(Singapore) Desmond Koh	4:37.25	(Singapore) Tan V Meng	4:40.43
4 × 100 m freestyle relay	Singapore; Ang Peng Siong; Harold Gan; David Lim; Kenneth Yeo	3:32.81	Indonesia	3:36.61	Philippines	3:40.00
4 × 200 m freestyle relay	Singapore	7:54.18	Philippines	8:01.20	Indonesia	8:04.11
4 × 100 m medley relay	Singapore	3:52.89	Indonesia	3:59.54	Philippines	4:01.54

Women's events

Event	Gold		Silver		Bronze	
50 m freestyle	(Philippines) Akiko Thomson	27.62	(Thailand) Thanyaluk Sakulkong	28.17	(Indonesia) Yustina Atmaja (Indonesia) Yen Yen Gunawan	28.58
100 m freestyle	(Philippines) Akiko Thomson	59.27	(Malaysia) Nurul Huda Abdullah	1:00.04	(Malaysia) May Tan Seok Khoon	1:00.52
200 m freestyle	(Malaysia) Nurul Huda Abdullah	2:05.75	(Malaysia) May Tan Seok Khoon	2.08.95	(Indonesia) Elfira Rosa Nasution	2:09.55
400 m freestyle	(Malaysia) Nurul Huda Abdullah	4:21.58	(Indonesia) Elfira Rosa Nasution	4:29.75	(Thailand) Thanya Sridama	4:30.28
800 m freestyle	(Malaysia) Nurul Huda Abdullah	9:06.67	(Thailand) Thanya Sridama	9:11.62	(Thailand) Anchalee Hoprasatsuk	9:33.38
100 m backstroke	(Philippines) Akiko Thomson	1:06.47	(Indonesia) Ratna Laurentia Pradipta	1:07.77	(Malaysia) Chan Peck Hong	1:10.24
200 m backstroke	(Malaysia) Nurul Huda Abdullah	2:23.65	(Philippines) Akiko Thomson	2:24.01	(Indonesia) Ratna Laurentia Pradipta	2:25.47
100 m breaststroke	(Thailand) Sornsawan Phuvichit	1:15.89	(Thailand) Maturada Kunapakorn	1:17.02	(Malaysia) Jong Su Ting	1:17.43
200 m breaststroke	(Thailand) Sornsawan Phuvichit	2:42.10	(Malaysia) Jong Su Ting	2:44.26	(Singapore) May Ooi	2:44.72
100 m butterfly	(Malaysia) May Tan Seok Khoon	1:04.05	(Malaysia) Nurul Huda Abdullah	1:04.81	(Indonesia) Elfira Rosa Nasution	1:05.39
200 m butterfly	(Malaysia) Nurul Huda Abdullah	2:18.76	(Malaysia) May Tan Seok Khoon		(Indonesia) Elfira Rosa Nasution	
200 m individual medley	(Malaysia) Nurul Huda Abdullah	2:22.74	(Indonesia) Elfira Rosa Nasution	2:23.44	(Singapore) May Ooi	2:29.21
400 m individual medley	(Malaysia) Nurul Huda Abdullah	4:59.61	(Indonesia) Elfira Rosa Nasution	5:05.37	(Thailand) Thanya Sridama	5:09.12
4 × 100 m freestyle relay	Indonesia	4:02.06	Thailand	4:03.85	Singapore	4:08.77
4 × 100 m medley relay	Malaysia	4:28.94	Indonesia	4:29.98	Thailand	4:33.32

=== Diving ===
Event	Gold		Silver		Bronze	
Men's 3 m springboard	(Indonesia) Kristendi Permana	550.20	(Indonesia) Kris Darmakusuma	545.30	(Thailand) Somchai Omkasing	533.75
Men's 10 m platform	(Thailand) Somchai Omkasing	493.45	(Indonesia) Eko Setiawan Loeloes	481.90	(Indonesia) Sugeng Riyadi	439.30
Women's 3 m springboard	(Indonesia) Dwi Mariastuti	378.90	(Indonesia) Sri Retno Ardiani	346.40	(Myanmar) Aye Aye Soe	342.10
Women's 10 m platform	(Indonesia) Dwi Mariastuti	338.65	(Myanmar) Aye Aye Soe	305.82	(Myanmar) Thuzar Aye	301.35

=== Water polo ===
Event	Gold	Silver	Bronze
Men's	Singapore	Malaysia	Indonesia
