= Thanya Sridama =

Thai swimmer

Personal information
- Born: 2 September 1975 (age 50)

Sport
- Sport: Swimming
Medal record
Representing Thailand
SEA Games
Gold medal – first place	1991 Manila	800m freestyle
Silver medal – second place	1989 Kuala Lumpur	800m freestyle
Silver medal – second place	1991 Manila	400m freestyle
Silver medal – second place	1993 Singapore	800m freestyle
Bronze medal – third place	1989 Kuala Lumpur	400m freestyle
Bronze medal – third place	1989 Kuala Lumpur	400m individual medley

Thanya Sridama (born 2 September 1975) is a Thai swimmer. She competed in two events at the 1992 Summer Olympics.
