= Jeffrey Ong =

Malaysian swimmer (born 1972)

Jeffrey Ong 王觀成
Personal information
- Full name: Ong Kuan Seng
- Nationality: Malaysian
- Born: 30 April 1972 (age 54) Penang, Malaysia
- Height: 6 ft (183 cm)

Sport
- Sport: Swimming
Medal record
Men's swimming
Representing Malaysia
Asian Games
Silver medal – second place	1990 Beijing	1500 m freestyle
Universiade
Silver medal – second place	1991 Sheffield	1500 m freestyle
SEA Games
Gold medal – first place	1987 Jakarta	400m freestyle
Gold medal – first place	1987 Jakarta	1500m freestyle
Gold medal – first place	1989 Kuala Lumpur	400m freestyle
Gold medal – first place	1989 Kuala Lumpur	1500m freestyle
Gold medal – first place	1991 Manila	400m freestyle
Gold medal – first place	1991 Manila	1500m freestyle
Gold medal – first place	1993 Singapore	400m freestyle
Gold medal – first place	1993 Singapore	1500m freestyle
Silver medal – second place	1991 Manila	200m freestyle

Jeffrey Ong Kuan Seng (born 30 April 1972) is a Malaysian swimmer. He competed at the 1988 Summer Olympics and the 1992 Summer Olympics.
