= Badminton at the 1993 SEA Games – Women's team =

Badminton – Women's team at the 1993 SEA Games
- Venue: Singapore Badminton Hall
- Dates: 13 – 15 June 1993
- Nations: 6

Medalists
gold medal	Indonesia (INA)
silver medal	Malaysia (MAS)
bronze medal	Thailand (THA)
bronze medal	Singapore (SIN)

The women's team badminton tournament at the 1993 SEA Games was held from 13 to 15 June 1993 at the Singapore Badminton Hall.

== Schedule ==
All times are Singapore Standard Time (UTC+08:00)

Date	Time	Event
Sunday, 13 June	19:00	First round
Monday, 14 June	19:00	Semi-finals
Tuesday, 15 June	19:00	Gold medal match

== Bracket ==
1st round
Singapore	4
Philippines	1

Semi-finals
Indonesia	5
Malaysia	0
Singapore	0
Thailand	5

Gold medal match
Indonesia	5
Thailand	0

== First round ==
=== Singapore vs Philippines ===
Singapore
4
Singapore Badminton Hall
13 June 1993, 19:00

Philippines
1

			1	2	3
1	(Singapore) (Philippines)	Zarinah Abdullah; Maria Celina Garcia	11; 0	11; 0
2	(Singapore) (Philippines)	Zanetta Li Yu / Chin Yen Li; Maria Celina Garcia / Racquel Uy	15; 6	4; 15	11; 15
3	(Singapore) (Philippines)	Irene Lee; Jeanette Villanueva	11; 8	11; 2
4	(Singapore) (Philippines)	Irene Lee / Zarinah Abdullah; Martha Millar / Jeanette Villanueva	15; 3	15; 3
5	(Singapore) (Philippines)	Chin Yen Peng; Martha Millar	11; 8	12; 10

== Semi-finals ==
=== Thailand vs Singapore ===
Thailand
5
Singapore Badminton Hall
14 June 1993, 19:00

Singapore
0

			1	2	3
1	(Thailand) (Singapore)	Somharuthai Jaroensiri; Zarinah Abdullah	11; 9	11; 8
2	(Thailand) (Singapore)	Plernta Boonyarit / Piyathip Sansaniyakulvilai; Zanetta Li Yu / Tan Chi Teng	15; 0	15; 2
3	(Thailand) (Singapore)	Pornsawan Plungwech; Ong Aili	11; 3	11; 3
4	(Thailand) (Singapore)	Ladawan Mulasartsatorn / Pornsawan Plungwech; Irene Lee / Zarinah Abdullah	15; 5	15; 6
5	(Thailand) (Singapore)	Natawan Yusakul; Chin Yen Peng	9; 12	11; 7	11; 1

=== Indonesia vs Malaysia ===
Indonesia
5
Singapore Badminton Hall
14 June 1993, 19:00

Malaysia
0

			1	2	3
1	(Indonesia) (Malaysia)	Sarwendah Kusumawardhani; Lee Wai Leng	11; 6	11; 3
2	(Indonesia) (Malaysia)	Minarti Timur; Tan Lee Wai	11; 6	11; 2
3	(Indonesia) (Malaysia)	Yuliani Santosa; Wong Mee Hung	11; 4	11; 1
4	(Indonesia) (Malaysia)	Finarsih / Lili Tampi; Lee Wai Leng / Tan Lee Wai	17; 14	15; 5
5	(Indonesia) (Malaysia)	Eliza Nathanael / Zelin Resiana; Wong Mee Hung / Zamaliah Sidek	15; 3	15; 4

== Gold medal match ==
=== Indonesia vs Thailand ===
Indonesia
5
Singapore Badminton Hall
15 June 1993, 19:00

Thailand
0

			1	2	3
1	(Indonesia) (Thailand)	Susi Susanti; Pornsawan Plungwech	11; 1	11; 6
2	(Indonesia) (Thailand)	Finarsih / Lili Tampi; Ladawan Mulasartsatorn / Piyathip Sansaniyakulvilai	15; 9	15; 4
3	(Indonesia) (Thailand)	Sarwendah Kusumawardhani; Chantid Thanissara	11; 2	11; 3
4	(Indonesia) (Thailand)	Eliza Nathanael / Zelin Resiana; Somharuthai Jaroensiri / Plernta Boonyarit	15; 6	15; 4
5	(Indonesia) (Thailand)	Yuliani Sentosa; Navaporn Chupandilok	11; 1	11; 1

== See also ==
- Individual event tournament
- Men's team tournament
