= Aquatics at the 1991 SEA Games =

Aquatics at the 1991 Southeast Asian Games included swimming, diving and water polo events. The three sports of aquatics were held in Manila, Philippines. Aquatics events was held between 25 November to 29 November.

== Medal winners ==
=== Swimming ===
Men's events

Event	Gold		Silver		Bronze	
50 m freestyle	(Singapore) Ang Peng Siong	23.89	(Indonesia) Richard Sam Bera	24.24	(Philippines) Raymond Papa	24.48
100 m freestyle	(Indonesia) Richard Sam Bera	52.30	(Indonesia) Wisnu Warsono	53.67	(Singapore) Kenneth Yeo	53.95
200 m freestyle	(Indonesia) Richard Sam Bera	1:54.72 (rec)	(Malaysia) Jeffrey Ong	1:55.97	(Indonesia) Albert Soetanto	1:58.59
400 m freestyle	(Malaysia) Jeffrey Ong	4:00.04 (rec)	(Thailand) Ratapong Sirisanont	4:07.32	(Thailand) Pawin Kohvathana	4:10.49
1500 m freestyle	(Malaysia) Jeffrey Ong	15:50.39	(Thailand) Ratapong Sirisanont	16:18.22	(Thailand) Pawin Kohvathana	16:34.72
100 m backstroke	(Singapore) David Lim Fong Jock	58.50	(Philippines) Leo Najera	59.08	(Philippines) Raymond Papa	1:00.12
200 m backstroke	(Philippines) Leo Najera	2:10.50	(Singapore) Desmond Koh Mun Kit	2:11.19	(Thailand) Dulyant Phuangthong	2:11.26
100 m breaststroke	(Philippines) Eric Buhain	1:04.18	(Indonesia) Wirmandi Sugriat		(Philippines) Lee Patrick Concepcion	1:05.66
200 m breaststroke	(Philippines) Lee Patrick Concepcion	2:21.47 (rec)	(Indonesia) Wirmandi Sugriat	2:22.03	(Thailand) Ratapong Sirisanont	2:23.31
100 m butterfly	(Philippines) Eric Buhain	56.67	(Indonesia) Wisnu Warsono	57.37	(Indonesia) Sabeni Sudiono	57.59
200 m butterfly	(Philippines) Eric Buhain	2:05.10	(Singapore) Tan V Meng	2:07.50	(Thailand) Niti Intharapichai	2:09.20
200 m individual medley	(Philippines) Eric Buhain	2:06.35	(Singapore) Desmond Koh Mun Kit	2:08.36	(Singapore) Tan V Meng	2:10.73
400 m individual medley	(Philippines) Eric Buhain	4:32.66 (rec)	(Thailand) Ratapong Sirisanont	4:33.51	(Singapore) Desmond Koh Mun Kit	4:33.70
4 × 100 m freestyle relay	Indonesia	3:32.74	Singapore	3:34.10	Philippines	3:37.34
4 × 200 m freestyle relay	Indonesia	7:54.31	Thailand	8:02.43	Philippines	8:07.45
4 × 100 m medley relay	Indonesia	3:54.66	Singapore	3:58.46	Thailand	4:09.09

Women's events

Event	Gold		Silver		Bronze	
50 m freestyle	(Thailand) Ratiporn Wong	27.53	(Philippines) Akiko Thomson	27.55	(Singapore) Joscelin Yeo Wei Ling	27.59
100 m freestyle	(Thailand) Ratiporn Wong	59.17	(Philippines) Akiko Thomson	59.25	(Indonesia) Meitri Widya Pangestika	59.76
200 m freestyle	(Indonesia) Elfira Rosa Nasution	2:07.12	(Thailand) Ratiporn Wong	2:08.55	(Indonesia) Meitri Widya Pangestika	2:08.75
400 m freestyle	(Indonesia) Elfira Rosa Nasution	4:25.41	(Thailand) Thanya Sridama	4:28.72	(Thailand) Mudjalin Chansurb	4:32.04
800 m freestyle	(Thailand) Thanya Sridama	9:09.70	(Thailand) Theradee Tochareon	9:13.61	(Indonesia) Meitri Widya Pangestika	9:21.62
100 m backstroke	(Philippines) Akiko Thomson	1:05.00	(Thailand) Praphalsai Minpraphal	1:07.10	(Indonesia) Elsa Manora Nasution	1:07.52
200 m backstroke	(Philippines) Akiko Thomson	2:20.23	(Thailand) Praphalsai Minpraphal	2:22.85	(Indonesia) Elsa Manora Nasution	2:25.22
100 m breaststroke	(Thailand) Sornsawan Phuvichit	1:13.07	(Singapore) Joscelin Yeo Wei Ling	1:14.36	(Thailand) Rasnin Sittart	1:16.53
200 m breaststroke	(Thailand) Sornsawan Phuvichit	2:38.21 (rec)	(Indonesia) Maya Masita Nasution	2:42.64	(Thailand) Rasnin Sittart	2:43.78
100 m butterfly	(Thailand) Ratiporn Wong	1:04.95	(Thailand) T. Sakulkong	1:04.99	(Singapore) May Ooi	1:05.49
200 m butterfly	(Thailand) Salline Khemcharra	2:19.72	(Thailand) Ratiporn Wong	2:21.39	(Indonesia) Susanti Wangsawiguna	2:21.75
200 m individual medley	(Indonesia) Elfira Rosa Nasution	2:22.20	(Thailand) Praphalsai Minpraphal	2:25.27	(Singapore) Joscelin Yeo Wei Ling	2:25.62
400 m individual medley	(Indonesia) Elfira Rosa Nasution	4:59.52	(Thailand) Praphalsai Minpraphal	5:03.64	(Indonesia) Maya Masita Nasution	5:08.14
4 × 100 m freestyle relay	Indonesia	4:00.94	Thailand	4:01.45	Singapore	4:07.24
4 × 100 m medley relay	Thailand	4:25.27	Singapore	4:29.63	Indonesia	4:31.36

=== Diving ===
Event	Gold		Silver		Bronze	
Men's 3 m springboard	(Indonesia) Temmy Kusuma	600.65	(Indonesia) Kristendi Permana	593.10	(Thailand) Pol Li Sohchal Ongkasing	579.55
Men's 10 m platform	(Indonesia) Bahri Bahriansyah		(Thailand) Somchai Ongkasing		(Indonesia) Husaini Noor	
Women's 3 m springboard	(Indonesia) Sri Muriastuti	202.25	(Myanmar) Aye Aye Soe	187.50	(Indonesia) Nani Suryani Walasaki	182.70
Women's 10 m platform	(Indonesia) Tuti Dwi Mariastuti		(Thailand) Bumroongroj On Anong		(Indonesia) Nuning Sulistyaningrum	

=== Water polo ===
Event	Gold	Silver	Bronze
Men's	Singapore	Malaysia	Philippines
