= Philippines at the 1993 SEA Games =

Philippines at the 1993 Southeast Asian Games
- IOC code: PHI
- NOC: Philippine Olympic Committee
- Website: www.olympic.ph (in English)

in Singapore
- Competitors: 490
- Medals Ranked 3rd: Gold 57 Silver 59 Bronze 72 Total 188

Southeast Asian Games appearances (overview)
- 1977; 1979; 1981; 1983; 1985; 1987; 1989; 1991; 1993; 1995; 1997; 1999; 2001; 2003; 2005; 2007; 2009; 2011; 2013; 2015; 2017; 2019; 2021; 2023; 2025; 2027; 2029

The Philippines participated in the 17th Southeast Asian Games held in Singapore from 12 to 20 June 1993.

== Medalists ==
=== Gold ===
No.	Medal	Name	Sport	Event
1	Gold	Philippines	Basketball	Men's team
2	Gold	Raymond Papa	Swimming	Men's 100m backstroke
3	Gold	Raymond Papa	Swimming	Men's 200m backstroke
4	Gold	Eric Buhain	Swimming	Men's 100m butterfly
5	Gold	Akiko Thomson	Swimming	Women's 100m backstroke
6	Gold	Akiko Thomson	Swimming	Women's 200m backstroke
7	Gold	Robert Angelo; Felix Barrientos; Sofronio Palahang; Roland So	Tennis	Men's team
8	Gold	Evangelina Olivarez; Francesca Maria La'o	Tennis	Women's doubles
9	Gold	Felix Barrientos; Jean Marie Lozano	Tennis	Mixed doubles
10	Gold	Robert Layug Vargas	Taekwondo	Men's sparring

=== Silver ===
No.	Medal	Name	Sport	Event
1	Silver	Clint Sayo	Archery	Men's individual recurve
2	Silver	Joann Chan Tabanag	Archery	Women's individual recurve
3	Silver	Philippines	Archery	Women's team recurve
4	Silver	Leo Najera	Swimming	Men's 100m backstroke
5	Silver	Eric Buhain	Swimming	Men's 100m breaststroke
6	Silver	Philippines	Swimming	Men's 4x100m medley relay
7	Silver	Roland So	Tennis	Men's singles
8	Silver	Evangelina Olivarez	Tennis	Women's singles
9	Silver	Evangelina Olivarez; Jennifer Saret; Francesca Marie La'o; Jean Marie Lozano	Tennis	Women's team
10	Silver	Sofronio Palahang; Jennifer Saret	Tennis	Mixed doubles
11	Silver	Philippines	Water Polo	Men's team

=== Bronze ===
No.	Medal	Name	Sport	Event
1	Bronze	Philippines	Archery	Men's team recurve
2	Bronze	Philippines	Basketball	Women's team
3	Bronze	Lee Patrick Concepcion	Swimming	Men's 100m backstroke
4	Bronze	Mary Joy Ong	Swimming	Women's 50m freestyle
5	Bronze	Felix Barrientos	Tennis	Men's singles
6	Bronze	Sofronio Palahang; Robert Angelo	Tennis	Men's doubles
7	Bronze	Jean Marie Lozano; Jennifer Saret	Tennis	Women's doubles
8	Bronze	Ramon Solis	Weightlifting	Men's Weightlifting

=== Multiple ===
Name	Sport	1st place, gold medalist(s)	2nd place, silver medalist(s)	3rd place, bronze medalist(s)	Total
Felix Barrientos	Tennis	2	0	1	3
Akiko Thomson	Swimming	2	0	0	2
Raymond Papa	Swimming	2	0	0	2
Sofronio Palahang	Tennis	1	1	1	3
Evangelina Olivarez	Tennis	1	2	0	3
Eric Buhain	Swimming	1	1	0	2
Francesca Marie La'o	Tennis	1	1	0	2
Jean Marie Lozano	Tennis	1	1	0	2
Roland So	Tennis	1	1	0	2
Robert Angelo	Tennis	1	0	1	2
Jennifer Saret	Tennis	0	2	1	3

== Medal summary ==
=== By sports ===
Sport	Gold	Silver	Bronze	Total
Athletics	6	6	7	19
Fencing	6	4	7	17
Shooting	5	9	6	20
Taekwondo	3	5	4	12
Judo	2	6	2	10
Bodybuilding	2	3	3	8
Bowling	2	3	3	8
Golf	2	2	0	4
Swimming	2	1	2	5
Equestrian	2	1	1	4
Boxing	1	6	5	12
Gymnastics	1	3	6	10
Billiards and snooker	1	2	1	4
Cycling	1	1	2	4
Weightlifting	1	0	5	6
Basketball	1	0	0	1
Archery	0	3	1	4
Sailing	0	2	2	4
Tennis	0	1	4	5
Volleyball	0	1	0	1
Silat Olahraga	0	0	2	2
Squash	0	0	2	2
Totals (22 entries)	38	59	65	162

== Basketball ==
The Philippines men's national basketball team fielded by the Basketball Association of the Philippines (BAP) is noted for defying expectations. Despite the Philippine Basketball League (PBL) refusing to lend its players to the national team due to its rift with the BAP, the "rag-tag" team went on to win a gold medal in the 1993 SEA Games basketball tournament.
