= Badminton at the 1993 SEA Games – Men's team =

Badminton – Men's team at the 1993 SEA Games
- Venue: Singapore Badminton Hall
- Dates: 13 – 15 June 1993
- Nations: 6

Medalists
gold medal	Indonesia (INA)
silver medal	Malaysia (MAS)
bronze medal	Thailand (THA)
bronze medal	Singapore (SIN)

The men's team badminton tournament at the 1993 SEA Games was held from 13 to 15 June 1993 at the Singapore Badminton Hall.

== Schedule ==
All times are Singapore Standard Time (UTC+08:00)

Date	Time	Event
Sunday, 13 June	19:00	First round
Monday, 14 June	19:00	Semi-finals
Tuesday, 15 June	19:00	Gold medal match

== Bracket ==
1st round
Singapore	5
Brunei	0
Philippines	0
Thailand	5

Semi-finals
Malaysia	5
Singapore	0
Thailand	1
Indonesia	4

Gold medal match
Malaysia	0
Indonesia	5

== First round ==
=== Singapore vs Brunei ===
Singapore
5
Singapore Badminton Hall
13 June 1993, 19:00

Brunei
0

			1	2	3
1	(Singapore) (Brunei)	You Kok Kiong; Wong Kong Soon	15; 3	15; 4
2	(Singapore) (Brunei)	Abdul Hamid Khan / Lim Boon Leng; Norumaizi Othman / Wong Kong Soon	15; 7	15; 8
3	(Singapore) (Brunei)	John Lim; Norumaizi Othman	15; 7	15; 8
4	(Singapore) (Brunei)	Patrick Lau / Lim Hong Han; Ermadena Haji Talip / Zailani Salleh	15; 0	15; 0
5	(Singapore) (Brunei)	Tan Sian Peng; Ermadena Haji Talip	15; 1	15; 0

=== Thailand vs Philippines ===
Thailand
5
Singapore Badminton Hall
13 June 1993, 19:00

Philippines
0

			1	2	3
1	(Thailand) (Philippines)	Sompol Kukasemkij; Rocky Magnaye	15; 3	15; 1
2	(Thailand) (Philippines)	Pramote Teerawiwatana / Sakrapee Thongsari; Jethanan Ramnani / Jacques Zialcita	15; 3	15; 6
3	(Thailand) (Philippines)	Kasemsak Chatujinda; Antonio Mance Jr.	15; 5	15; 5
4	(Thailand) (Philippines)	Monthon Bumphenkeitikul / Khunakorn Sudhisodhi; Enrique John Campos / Ronald Magnaye	15; 7	15; 2
5	(Thailand) (Philippines)	Luecha Kajonnetikul; Jaime Llanes	15; 4	15; 1

== Semi-finals ==
=== Malaysia vs Singapore ===
Malaysia
5
Singapore Badminton Hall
14 June 1993, 19:00

Singapore
0

			1	2	3
1	(Malaysia) (Singapore)	Ong Ewe Hock; Abdul Hamid Khan	15; 5	15; 12
2	(Malaysia) (Singapore)	Tan Kim Her / Yap Kim Hwee; Patrick Lau / Lim Hong Han	15; 2	15; 1
3	(Malaysia) (Singapore)	Wong Ewee Mun; You Kok Kiong	15; 4	15; 6
4	(Malaysia) (Singapore)	Cheah Soon Kit / Soo Beng Kiang; Abdul Hamid Khan / Lim Boon Leng	15; 11	15; 5
5	(Malaysia) (Singapore)	Pang Chen; Lim Boon Leng				w/o

=== Indonesia vs Thailand ===
Indonesia
4
Singapore Badminton Hall
14 June 1993, 19:00

Thailand
1

			1	2	3
1	(Indonesia) (Thailand)	Hariyanto Arbi; Sompol Kukasemkij	10; 15	8; 15
2	(Indonesia) (Thailand)	Rexy Mainaky / Ricky Subagja; Pramote Teerawiwatana / Sakrapee Thongsari	15; 7	15; 9
3	(Indonesia) (Thailand)	Joko Suprianto; Kasemsak Chatujinda	15; 5	15; 1
4	(Indonesia) (Thailand)	Rudy Gunawan / Denny Kantono; Monthon Bumphenkeitikul / Khunakorn Sudhisodhi	15; 6	15; 3
5	(Indonesia) (Thailand)	Alan Budikusuma; Luecha Kajonnetikul				w/o

== Gold medal match ==
=== Malaysia vs Indonesia ===
Malaysia
0
Singapore Badminton Hall
15 June 1993, 19:00

Indonesia
5

			1	2	3
1	(Malaysia) (Indonesia)	Ong Ewe Hock; Joko Suprianto	5; 15	7; 15
2	(Malaysia) (Indonesia)	Cheah Soon Kit / Soo Beng Kiang; Rexy Mainaky / Ricky Subagja	5; 15	15; 15
3	(Malaysia) (Indonesia)	Wong Eewe Mun; Ardy Wiranata	2; 15	3; 15
4	(Malaysia) (Indonesia)	Tan Kim Her / Yap Kim Hock; Rudy Gunawan / Denny Kantono	8; 15	12; 15
5	(Malaysia) (Indonesia)	Pang Chen; Alan Budikusuma	15; 12	10; 15	12; 15

== See also ==
- Individual event tournament
- Women's team tournament
