= Richard Sam Bera =

Indonesian swimmer (born 1971)

Personal information
- Full name: Richard Sam Bera
- National team: Indonesia
- Born: 19 December 1971 (age 54) Jakarta, Indonesia
- Height: 1.83 m (6 ft 0 in)
- Weight: 75 kg (165 lb)

Sport
- Sport: Swimming
- Strokes: Freestyle, medley
- College team: Arizona State University (USA)
- Coach: Otman Siregar (INA), Kevin Perry (USA), Ernest Maglischo (USA) & Michael Chasson (USA)
Medal record
Men's swimming
Representing Indonesia
Event	1st	2nd	3rd
Asian Games	0	0	1
Asian Championships	0	1	0
Southeast Asian Games	22	14	9
Total	22	15	10
Asian Games
Bronze medal – third place	1990 Beijing	100 m freestyle
Asian Championships
Silver medal – second place	2000 Busan	100 m freestyle
Southeast Asian Games
Gold medal – first place	1989 Kuala Lumpur	100 m freestyle
Gold medal – first place	1991 Manila	100 m freestyle
Gold medal – first place	1991 Manila	200 m freestyle
Gold medal – first place	1991 Manila	4x100 m freestyle
Gold medal – first place	1991 Manila	4x200 m freestyle
Gold medal – first place	1993 Singapore	200 m freestyle
Gold medal – first place	1993 Singapore	4x100 m freestyle
Gold medal – first place	1993 Singapore	4x200 m freestyle
Gold medal – first place	1993 Singapore	4x100 m medley
Gold medal – first place	1995 Chiang Mai	50 m freestyle
Gold medal – first place	1995 Chiang Mai	100 m freestyle
Gold medal – first place	1995 Chiang Mai	4x100 m freestyle
Gold medal – first place	1997 Jakarta	50 m freestyle
Gold medal – first place	1997 Jakarta	100 m freestyle
Gold medal – first place	1997 Jakarta	4x100 m freestyle
Gold medal – first place	1999 Bandar Seri Begawan	50 m freestyle
Gold medal – first place	1999 Bandar Seri Begawan	100 m freestyle
Gold medal – first place	1999 Bandar Seri Begawan	4x100 m freestyle
Gold medal – first place	2001 Kuala Lumpur	50 m freestyle
Gold medal – first place	2001 Kuala Lumpur	100 m freestyle
Gold medal – first place	2005 Manila	100 m freestyle
Gold medal – first place	2005 Manila	4x100 m medley
Silver medal – second place	1987 Jakarta	4x100 m freestyle
Silver medal – second place	1989 Kuala Lumpur	50 m freestyle
Silver medal – second place	1989 Kuala Lumpur	200 m freestyle
Silver medal – second place	1989 Kuala Lumpur	400 m freestyle
Silver medal – second place	1989 Kuala Lumpur	4x100 m freestyle
Silver medal – second place	1991 Manila	400 m freestyle
Silver medal – second place	1991 Manila	50 m freestyle
Silver medal – second place	1991 Manila	4x100 m medley
Silver medal – second place	1993 Singapore	100 m freestyle
Silver medal – second place	1993 Singapore	50 m freestyle
Silver medal – second place	2001 Kuala Lumpur	4x100 m freestyle
Silver medal – second place	2005 Manila	50 m freestyle
Silver medal – second place	2005 Manila	4x100 m freestyle
Silver medal – second place	2007 Nakhon Ratchasima	4x100 m freestyle
Bronze medal – third place	1987 Jakarta	4x100 m freestyle
Bronze medal – third place	1989 Kuala Lumpur	4x200 m freestyle
Bronze medal – third place	1995 Chiang Mai	4x200 m freestyle
Bronze medal – third place	1997 Jakarta	4x200 m freestyle
Bronze medal – third place	1997 Jakarta	4x100 m medley
Bronze medal – third place	1999 Bandar Seri Begawan	4x200 m freestyle
Bronze medal – third place	2001 Kuala Lumpur	4x100 m freestyle
Bronze medal – third place	2003 Vietnam	50 m freestyle
Bronze medal – third place	2005 Manila	4x200 m freestyle

Richard Sam Bera (born 19 December 1971) is a former Indonesian swimmer, who specialized in sprint and middle-distance freestyle events. He is a three-time Olympian (1988, 1996, and 2000), a bronze medalist at the Asian Games (1990), and a twenty-three times SEA Games gold-medalist (individuals and relays) since his debut in 1987. He is regarded as Indonesia's most successful swimmer in the sporting history. Up until 2015, Bera held several Indonesian and Southeast Asian Games records in sprint freestyle events from the Southeast Asian Games.

== Career ==
=== Early years ===
Bera made his official debut, as Indonesia's youngest swimmer (aged 16), at the 1988 Summer Olympics in Seoul. He failed to reach the top 16 final in any of his individual events, finishing forty-first in the newly introduced 50 m freestyle (24.67), forty-seventh in the 100 m freestyle (53.59), forty-eighth in the 200 m freestyle (1:57.60), forty-third in the 400 m freestyle (4:08.70), and thirty-seventh in the 200 m individual medley (2:13.90).

Bera's name reached towards an early sport popularity when, as a 17-year-old, he earned his first-ever gold medal in the 100 m freestyle (52.19) and bronze in the newly introduced 50 m freestyle at the 1989 Southeast Asian Games in Kuala Lumpur, Malaysia beating the then current champion of the distance, the great Ang Peng Siong of Singapore.

One year later, at the 1990 Asian Games in Beijing, China, Bera won a bronze medal in the 100 m freestyle at 51.79, trailing China's Xie Jun by almost a full second.

=== College career ===
His college swimming career started off in Northern California when he attended Foothill College until 1993. Bera was California Community College Champion in 50, 100, and 200 yd freestyle for two years. And in 1993, he set a new California and US National Junior College record in 100 yd freestyle with the time of 44.73. After his successful campaign in California, Bera accepted an athletic scholarship to attend the Arizona State University in Tempe, Arizona, where he swam for the Arizona State Sun Devils swimming and diving team under head coach Ernest Maglischo first and then Michael Chasson. While swimming for the Sun Devils, he received four All-American honors in the 100-yard freestyle, and all freestyle relays (200, 400, and 800). Bera was a regular finalist in 100 and 200 yards freestyle at Pac-10 Championships during his NCAA Division I career. And he capped it off in his final season with automatic qualifying time in 100 yd free for 1995 NCAA Championships. He was also a member of Sun Devils' 400 yd Medley Relay team that finished top 6 that year. After his senior season, Bera turned himself into a professional swimmer and then made a strong comeback for the Indonesian swimming team. At the 1995 Southeast Asian Games in Chiang Mai, Thailand, Bera powered past the entire swimming field to strike a sprint freestyle double (both 50 and 100 m). Up until 2017, Bera remains the only Indonesian athlete in any sports who has ever earned the All-American Division 1 accolade.

=== International comebacks ===
After an eight-year absence since his first Olympics in 1988 as a 16-year-old, Bera qualified for his second Indonesian team at the 1996 Summer Olympics in Atlanta. Although he was able to improve his standards from past tournaments, Bera still placed in a "middle-of-the-pack" in any of his individual events, finishing forty-fourth in the 50 m freestyle (23.80), and thirty-fourth in the 100 m freestyle (51.25).

When his country Indonesia hosted the 1997 Southeast Asian Games in Jakarta, Bera was delighted and overwhelmed by the home crowd, as he edged out Filipino favourite Raymond Papa to defend his titles in both the 50 and 100 m freestyle. A feat that he repeated again at the 1999 Southeast Asian Games in Brunei Darussalam and the 2001 Southeast Asian Games in Kuala Lumpur.

Shortly after the 1997 Games, Bera announced his retirement to concentrate on his job as an assistant coach for the Arizona State Sun Devils. On that same year, he graduated from the university with a Bachelor of Science degree in political science and a Bachelor of Arts in economics.

But two years later, in 1999, Bera came home to Indonesia and made a decision to come out of retirement, and set up an official return to the Indonesian swimming team. At the Southeast Asian Games, he defended his 100 m freestyle title for the third straight time in a Games record-breaking time of 51.03, slashing 0.28 seconds off the mark set by his teammate Wisnu Wardhana in 1993. He also defended his 50 m freestyle crown when he swam 23.49, more than two-tenths of a second (0.20) outside his own 10-year-old record.

In March 2000, Bera competed in the 6th Asian Swimming Championships in Busan, South Korea, and came away with a silver medal in 100 m freestyle with the time of 51.34, being edged out by home favorite Kim Min-suk for the Gold. At the 2000 Summer Olympics in Sydney, Bera competed again in a sprint freestyle double since his remarkable comeback from Atlanta. After defending third straight titles from the SEA Games, his entry times of 23.49 (50 m freestyle) and 51.03 (100 m freestyle) were accredited under a FINA B-standard. In the 100 m freestyle, Bera placed thirty-seventh on the morning prelims. Swimming in heat six, he edged out Israel's Yoav Bruck to take a sixth spot by exactly a tenth of a second (0.10) in 51.52. Two days later, in the 50 m freestyle, Bera challenged seven other swimmers in heat five, including Bahamas' Allan Murray, top 16 finalist in Atlanta four years earlier. He came up short in third place and forty-second overall at 23.54, just a small fraction off his entry time.

At the 2001 Southeast Asian Games in Kuala Lumpur, Malaysia, Bera matched his own record of 51.03 to claim a 100 m freestyle title for the fourth straight time, edging out host nation's Allen Ong by 0.28 of a second.

Twelve years after winning a bronze medal, Bera competed for the second time, as a strong 31-year-old veteran, at the 2002 Asian Games in Busan, South Korea. He missed the podium twice in any of his swimming events, finishing fourth in the 50 m freestyle (23.49), and fifth in the 100 m freestyle (51.41).

At the 2003 Southeast Asian Games in Hanoi, Vietnam, Bera only won a bronze medal in the 50 m freestyle at 23.73, finishing behind surprising Thai teenager Arwut Chinnapasaen and his Malaysian nemesis Allen Ong by four-tenths of a second (0.40).

Eighteen years since his debut, Bera made his final appearance as individual swimmer at the 2005 Southeast Asian Games in Manila. Surprisingly, even in the age of 34, he managed to win a total of five swimming medals: two golds in the 100 m freestyle (51.94) and in the 4 × 100 m medley relay (3:51.51), two silvers each in the 50 m freestyle (23.36) and in the 4 × 100 m freestyle relay (3:29.46), and a bronze in the 4 x 200 freestyle relay (7:43.56).

Shortly after the Games, Bera announced his second, yet official retirement from swimming, ending a career with three Olympic appearances, and more than forty SEA Games medals to his collection. And up until 2022 Asian Games, Bera and fellow countrymen breast-stroker Wirmandi Sugriat, remain the last Indonesian swimmers who medaled at Asian Games.

== Life after swimming ==
Since 2000, Bera has been working as a sports broadcaster for MetroTV on the western outskirts of Jakarta. After that, he was placed as editor-in-chief for FHM and Men's Fitness Indonesia Magazines. Following his retirement from swimming, Bera still remained strong and faithful to his sporting regime. He became one of the founders of National Champions Millennium Aquatics Club, and later competed in both Olympic and sprint-distance triathlons across Indonesia, specifically in Bali. Bera was unofficially crowned as the father of modern triathlon in Indonesia, when he started to spread the "triathlon virus" in 2009. He was training to keep himself healthy by doing cycling and running along with swimming. At the time, barely anyone in Indonesia was aware of the sport of triathlon.

Bera also attended both as a spectator and as an observer at the 2012 Summer Olympics in London. Watching the athlete procession from the stands during the closing ceremony, he reminisced an Olympic moment from his Twitter: "Seeing all those athletes down there, a bit emotional for me. I used to be down there".

In 2015, Bera elected President of Indonesia Olympians Association and served until 2018. From 2015 to 2017, he was also part of the Board of Commissioner of Ministry of Youth and Sports' High-Performance Program called PRIMA. And then in May 2018, Bera was appointed by the Minister of Youth and Sports of the Republic of Indonesia, Mr. Imam Nahrawi, as Ketua Umum or Chairman of Badan Olahraga Profesional Indonesia (Indonesia Professional Sports Agency) or BOPI. This latest position is to see Bera as the head of the government's regulating as well as developing agency of all professional sports in the country, which include among others Indonesian football leagues, Indonesian Basketball League, and Indonesian MMA leagues. He is now living with in Jakarta.
