= Weightlifting at the 1993 SEA Games =

- Venue: Tampines Sports Hall
- Dates: 13 June 1993

Weightlifting at the 1993 Southeast Asian Games was held at the Tampines Sports Hall in Singapore.

== Medal table ==
* Host nation (Singapore)

Rank	Nation	Gold	Silver	Bronze	Total
1	Indonesia (INA)	4	2	2	8
2	Thailand (THA)	3	2	3	8
3	Philippines (PHI)	1	4	2	7
4	Myanmar (MYA)	1	0	1	2
5	Singapore (SIN)*	0	1	0	1
Totals (5 entries)		9	9	8	26

== Medal summary ==
Event	Gold		Silver		Bronze	
54 kg	Hari Setiawan; Indonesia	250 kg	Teo Yong Joo; Singapore	222.5 kg	Sinchai Khatsri; Thailand	220 kg
59 kg	Samuel Alegada; Philippines	260 kg	Taufik; Indonesia	240 kg	Samat Hansawong; Thailand	235 kg
64 kg	Sodikin; Indonesia	285 kg	Jose Arnel Salazar; Philippines	247.5 kg	None awarded (Note: Chan Hon Ming of Singapore placed third with 140 kg but was not awarded the bronze medal since there were only 3 competitors in this event.)	
70 kg	Lukman; Indonesia	307.5 kg	Chaleampol Moonmongkol; Thailand	285 kg	Roberto Colonia; Philippines	255 kg
77 kg	Aran Boonlue; Thailand	310 kg	Nicolas Jaluag; Philippines	302.5 kg	Myint Naing Oo; Myanmar	302.5 kg
91 kg	Kyaw Thet; Myanmar		Theregiat Phuekasem; Thailand		Ferry Ardiato; Indonesia	
99 kg	Sunaryo; Indonesia		Ramon Solis; Philippines	312.5 kg	Luis Bayanin; Philippines	295 kg
108 kg	Somchai Boonlue; Thailand		Mohamad Yasin; Indonesia		Sirichai Choatissanawong; Thailand	
108+ kg	Sarayudt Pisarnvapee; Thailand		Jaime Sebastian; Philippines	297.5 kg	I Nyoman Ari; Indonesia	
