= Archery at the 1993 SEA Games =

- Venue: Gloucester Archery Range

Archery at the 1993 SEA Games was held at the Gloucester Archery Range in Singapore.

== Medal table ==
* Host nation (Singapore)

| Rank | Nation | Gold | Silver | Bronze | Total |
|---|---|---|---|---|---|
| 1 | Indonesia (INA) | 4 | 0 | 1 | 5 |
| 2 | Philippines (PHI) | 0 | 3 | 1 | 4 |
| 3 | Thailand (THA) | 0 | 1 | 1 | 2 |
| 4 | Malaysia (MAS) | 0 | 0 | 1 | 1 |
| Totals (4 entries) | | 4 | 4 | 4 | 12 |

== Medal summary ==
=== Men ===
| Event | Gold | Silver | Bronze |
|---|---|---|---|
| Individual recurve | Hendra Setijawan; Indonesia | Clint Sayo; Philippines | Boonsom Jarat; Thailand |
| Team recurve | Indonesia (INA) | Thailand (THA) | Philippines (PHI) |

=== Women ===
| Event | Gold | Silver | Bronze |
|---|---|---|---|
| Individual recurve | Nurfitriyana Saiman; Indonesia | Joann Tabang; Philippines | Hamdiah Damanhuri; Indonesia |
| Team recurve | Indonesia (INA) | Philippines (PHI) | Malaysia (MAS) |
