= Kenneth Yeo =

Singaporean swimmer

Personal information
- Born: 2 February 1974 (age 52)

Sport
- Sport: Swimming
Medal record
Representing Singapore
Asian Games
Bronze medal – third place	1990 Beijing	4x100m freestyle relay
SEA Games
Bronze medal – third place	1991 Manila	100m freestyle
Bronze medal – third place	1993 Singapore	200m freestyle

Kenneth Yeo Wi Jin (born 2 February 1974) is a Singaporean former freestyle swimmer. He competed in four events at the 1992 Summer Olympics.
