= Gary Tan =

Gary Tan may refer to:

- Gary Tan (swimmer, born 1982)
- Gary Tan (swimmer, born 1973)

== See also ==
- Garry Tan
