= Jeffrey Wang =

Jeffrey Wang may refer to:

- Jeffrey Ong (Chinese: 王觀成, born 1972), Malaysian swimmer
- Jeff Wang (Chinese: 王建復, born 1976), Taiwanese actor
