= Gary Tan (swimmer, born 1973) =

Singaporean swimmer

Personal information
- Full name: V Meng Tan
- Born: 23 September 1973 (age 52)

Sport
- Sport: Swimming
Medal record
Representing Singapore
SEA Games
Silver medal – second place	1989 Kuala Lumpur	200m backstroke
Silver medal – second place	1989 Kuala Lumpur	200m butterfly
Silver medal – second place	1991 Manila	200m butterfly
Bronze medal – third place	1989 Kuala Lumpur	400m individual medley
Bronze medal – third place	1991 Manila	200m individual medley

V Meng "Gary" Tan (born 23 September 1973) is a Singaporean backstroke, butterfly and medley swimmer. He competed in four events at the 1992 Summer Olympics.

In 1991, Tan got all three relay golds at the Southeast Asia Games. He also had Neo Chwee Kok as one of his coaches.
