= Shooting at the 1991 SEA Games =

Shooting events at the 1991 Southeast Asian Games were held between 25 November to 1 December 1991 at Fort Bonifacio, Manila, Philippines.

== Medal table ==
Rank	Nation	Gold	Silver	Bronze	Total
1	Thailand (THA)	14	10	4	28
2	Philippines (PHI)	10	5	10	25
3	Vietnam (VIE)	4	8	4	16
4	Malaysia (MAS)	2	3	5	10
5	Indonesia (INA)	1	3	3	7
6	Burma (BIR)	1	0	1	2
7	Singapore (SIN)	0	3	5	8
Totals (7 entries)		32	32	32	96

== Medal summary ==
=== Men ===
Event	Gold		Silver		Bronze	
Individual air rifle	(Philippines) Emerito Concepción	570 pts	(Thailand) Samarn Jongsuk	568	(Malaysia) Abdul Mutalib	567
Team air rifle	(Philippines) PHILIPPINES	1.685 pts	(Indonesia) INDONESIA	1.681	(Thailand) THAILAND	1.680
Free pistol	(Myanmar) Soe Myint	545 pts	(Vietnam) Tran Van Phiem	541	(Philippines) Carolino Gonzales	540
Team free pistol	(Thailand) THAILAND	1.693 pts	(Malaysia) MALAYSIA	1.659	(Myanmar) MYANMAR	1.692
Air pistol	(Thailand) Nooparat Ghoultan	573 pts	(Vietnam) Tran Van Phiem	570	(Malaysia) Sabiamad Abdul Ahad	568
Team air pistol	(Thailand) THAILAND	1.706 pts	(Vietnam) VIETNAM	1.702	(Malaysia) MALAYSIA	1.684
Practical pistol	(Philippines) Joel San Vicente	545 pts	(Thailand) Tawat Kong-In	541	(Singapore) Eric Ngo	540
Team practical pistol	(Philippines) PHILIPPINES	2.519 pts	(Thailand) THAILAND	2.503	(Singapore) SINGAPORE	2.359
Standard pistol	(Thailand) Peepa Promratana	573 pts	(Malaysia) Sabiamad Abdul Ahad	563	(Vietnam) Dam Cao Son	561
Team standard pistol	(Thailand) THAILAND	1.706 pts	(Vietnam) VIETNAM	1.665	(Philippines) PHILIPPINES	1.642
Rapid fire pistol	(Vietnam) Trịnh Quốc Việt	576 pts	(Philippines) Nathaniel Padilla	575	(Vietnam) Nguyen Quoc Cuong	575
Team rapid fire pistol	(Vietnam) VIETNAM	1.714 pts	(Thailand) THAILAND	1.700	(Philippines) PHILIPPINES	1.686
Small bore rifle	(Thailand) Nopparat Yamiaspradit	576 pts	(Vietnam) Nguyen Tan Nam	575	(Philippines) Bartolomeo Teyab	575
Team rapid fire pistol	(Thailand) THAILAND	3.354	(Vietnam) VIETNAM	3.338	(Philippines) PHILIPPINES	3.331
Free rifle	(Philippines) Bartolomeo Teyab	586 pts	(Thailand) Sanit Boonsiri	585	(Vietnam) Truong Anh Dong	582
Team free rifle	(Thailand) THAILAND	1.736 pts	(Vietnam) VIETNAM	1.730	(Philippines) PHILIPPINES	1.729
Action shotgun	(Philippines) R. Martinez	22.44	(Thailand) Panja Jitprasong	24.55	(Singapore) Buhari Shaffi	29.78
Team action shotgun	(Philippines) PHILIPPINES	72.79	(Thailand) THAILAND	82.43	(Singapore) SINGAPORE	93.15
Individual trap	(Philippines) Joey Valdez	219 pts	(Malaysia) Peter Lim	203	(Singapore) Ricky Soon	203
Team trap	(Philippines) PHILIPPINES	407	(Singapore) SINGAPORE	401	(Malaysia) MALAYSIA	401
Individual skeet	(Malaysia) Kaw Fun Ying	215 pts	(Singapore) Peter Lee	214	(Thailand) Somchai Chachaeanich	207
Team skeet	(Malaysia) MALAYSIA	421	(Philippines) PHILIPPINES	405	(Thailand) THAILAND	403

=== Women's ===
Event	Gold		Silver		Bronze	
10 m air rifle	(Indonesia) Shanti Dewi Pupradjono	388 pts	(Thailand) Ladamas Sarisut	384	(Vietnam) Dang Thi Dong	374
Team air rifle	(Thailand) THAILAND	1.129 pts	(Indonesia) INDONESIA	1.127	(Malaysia) MALAYSIA	1.112
Rifle 3 position	(Thailand) Ladamas Sarisut	564 pts	(Vietnam) Dang Thi Dong	558	(Philippines) Catherine Sanchez	550
Team rifle 3 position	(Thailand) THAILAND	1.653	(Indonesia) INDONESIA	1.642	(Philippines) PHILIPPINES	1.633
Standard rifle prone	(Vietnam) Dhang Thi Dong	595 (rec)	(Philippines) Concepcion Samaniego	587	(Thailand) Thiranun Jinda	583
Team rifle prone	(Vietnam) VIETNAM	1.755 (rec)	(Thailand) THAILAND	1.731	(Philippines) PHILIPPINES	1.727
25 m sport pistol	(Thailand) Rampai Sriyai	570 pts	(Philippines) Celina de Castro	566	(Indonesia) Nuris Melly	556
Team sport pistol	(Philippines) PHILIPPINES	1.689 pts	(Thailand) THAILAND	1.667	(Indonesia) INDONESIA	1.664
Air pistol	(Thailand) Saiphin Yana	380 pts	(Singapore) Khatijah Suratte	378	(Philippines) Susan Aguado	374
Team air pistol	(Thailand) THAILAND	1.117 pts	(Philippines) PHILIPPINES	1.109	(Indonesia) INDONESIA	1.108
