= Weightlifting at the 1991 SEA Games =

- Venue: University of the Philippines
- Dates: 26 November - 2 December

Weightlifting at the 1991 SEA Games was held between 26 November to 2 December at Philippines University Gymnasium, Manila.

== Medal table ==
Rank	Nation	Gold	Silver	Bronze	Total
1	Indonesia (INA)	8	9	1	18
2	Thailand (THA)	6	6	5	17
3	Myanmar (MYA)	4	2	3	9
4	Philippines (PHI)	1	2	8	11
5	Singapore (SIN)	0	0	1	1
Totals (5 entries)		19	19	18	56

=== Men ===
Event	Gold		Silver		Bronze	
52 kg Overall	(Indonesia) Enosh Depthios	223 kg (rec)	(Indonesia) Wahjudi	222 kg	(Philippines) Antonio Agustin	217 kg
56 kg Overall	(Indonesia) Sodikin	255 kg (rec)	(Philippines) Samuel Alegada	240 kg	(Myanmar) Myo Myint	222 kg
60 kg Overall	(Indonesia) Daryanto	270 kg (rec)	(Indonesia) Sugiono Katijo	255 kg	(Philippines) J. A. Salazar	242 kg
67 kg Overall	(Indonesia) Dirdja Wihardja	285 kg	(Indonesia) Lukman	280 kg	(Singapore) Teo Yung Joo	197 kg
75 kg Overall	(Indonesia) Siswoyo	305 kg (rec)	(Philippines) Nicholas Taluag	285 kg	(Thailand) Chalor Yoermpo	270 kg
82 kg Overall	(Thailand) Prasert Sumpradit		(Indonesia) Sunaryo		(Philippines) Leonardo Liena	
90 kg Overall	(Philippines) Ramon Solis	310 kg	(Indonesia) Feri Adriatos	295 kg	(Thailand) Boonlue Aran	292 kg
100 kg Overall	(Myanmar) Kyaw Htet	305 kg	(Thailand) Phuekkasem Theregiat	300 kg	(Philippines) Luis Bayanin	275 kg
110 kg Overall	(Thailand) Somchai Boonlue	305 kg	(Myanmar) Thi Han	270 kg	(Thailand) Choatrissanawong Sirichai	270 kg
Above 110 kg Overall	(Thailand) Sarayutti Isaroyapee	310 kg	(Thailand) Paraphal Premtoom	295 kg	(Philippines) Eddie Ramos	292 kg

=== Women ===
Event	Gold		Silver		Bronze	
44 kg Overall	(Thailand) Sa-nga Wangkiri	137,5 kg	(Indonesia) Farida Samad	132,5 kg	(Philippines) Liza Danao	90 kg
48 kg Overall	(Indonesia) Sri Wahyuni	142,5 kg	(Thailand) Penpan Moonmongkol	125 kg	(Philippines) Florinda Paunil	97 kg
52 kg Overall	(Thailand) Ratchanee Bunmaread	165 kg	(Indonesia) Ratnawati Rasyid	152 kg	(Philippines) Jullie Borromeo	115 kg
56 kg Overall	(Thailand) Wasana Putcharkarn	167 kg	(Indonesia) Sriyani	160 kg	(Myanmar) Ni Ni Han	135 kg
60 kg Overall	(Indonesia) Suyati	167 kg	(Myanmar) Khin San Myint	155 kg	(Thailand) Khassaraporn Suta	152 kg
67 kg Overall	(Indonesia) Patmawati Abdul Hamid	195 kg	(Thailand) Supah Sukwang	155 kg	(Myanmar) Win Win Mat	145 kg
75 kg Overall	(Myanmar) Phyu Phyu Thi	181 kg	(Thailand) Boonak Orapan	180 kg	(Indonesia) Ni Made Widiani	171 kg
82 kg Overall	(Myanmar) San San Nu	185 kg	(Indonesia) Julien Lasut	170 kg	(Thailand) Chaiporn Kanala	160 kg
Above 82 kg Overall	(Myanmar) Nam Bway Htoo	175 kg	(Thailand) Visottipot Nawwarat	160 kg	no bronze medal	
