= Cycling at the 1991 SEA Games =

The cycling competitions at the 1991 SEA Games were held at Romulo Highway and Amoranto Velodrome, Quezon City, Philippine from 25 November to 30 November 1991.

== Medal table ==
Rank	Nation	Gold	Silver	Bronze	Total
1	Indonesia (INA)	4	2	1	7
2	Philippines (PHI)	3	1	0	4
3	Malaysia (MAS)	2	1	4	7
4	Thailand (THA)	1	5	4	10
5	Singapore (SIN)	0	1	1	2
Totals (5 entries)		10	10	10	30

== Medal summary ==
=== Men's ===
Event	Gold		Silver		Bronze	
Sprint	(Indonesia) Kalimanto		(Malaysia) Rosman Alwi		(Malaysia) Dzulkarmin Ibrahim	
1.600 m massed start	(Indonesia) Kalimanto	2:26.30	(Thailand) Thanakorn Wistahapeeda	2:26.37	(Malaysia) Haris Fadzillah Usman	2:26.44
4.800 m massed start	(Indonesia) Puspita Mustika Adya	8:47.75	(Thailand) Thanakorn Wistahapeeda	8:47.89	(Thailand) Somsak Promsum	8:47.94
4 km individual pursuit	(Malaysia) Murugayan Kumaresan	5:03.58	(Singapore) Kenneth Tan	5:08.89	(Thailand) Sompong Kootawesub	5:17.14
4 km team pursuit	(Philippines) PHILIPPINES	4:47.90	(Indonesia) INDONESIA	4:48.66	(Thailand) THAILAND	4:54.16
1 km time trial	(Philippines) Joselito Santos	1:11.18	(Indonesia) Puspita Mustika Adya	1:11.23	(Malaysia) Rosman Alwi	1:12.31
100 km team trial	(Philippines) PHILIPPINES	2:24:00	(Thailand) THAILAND	2:24:16	(Indonesia) INDONESIA	2:26:19
30 km point race	(Malaysia) Murugayan Kumaresan	43 pts	(Thailand) Sompong Kootawesub	40	(Singapore) Kenneth Tan	35

=== Women's ===
Event	Gold		Silver		Bronze	
1 km time trial	(Indonesia) Nurhayati	1:19.85	(Philippines) Elaine Henson	1:21.95	(Malaysia) Wan Maizan Radzi	1:23.34
55,2 km road race	(Thailand) Chalern Chamchiun	1:46:39	(Thailand) Panna Deekampa	1:47:00	(Thailand) Siri Pengpit	1:50:59
