= Gymnastics at the 1991 SEA Games =

Gymnastics events at the 1991 SEA Games were held between 25 and 29 November 1991 at Rizal Memorial Coliseum, Manila, Philippines.

== Medal summary ==
=== Men ===
Event	Gold		Silver		Bronze	
Men's Team	Thailand	271.50 pts	Philippines	258.90	Indonesia	254.40
Individual all-round	(Thailand) Teeruch Poparnich	55.10 pts	(Thailand) Amornthep Valsang	54.80	(Thailand) Propong Itthayothasakul	43.35
Floor exercise	(Philippines) Richard Otero	9,200 pts	(Thailand) Amornthep Valsang	9,100	(Thailand) Propong Itthayothasakul	9,100
Pommel horse	(Thailand) Teeruch Poparnich	9,275 pts	(Thailand) Amornthep Valsang	9,175	(Philippines) Aldrin Macawid	8,825
Rings	(Thailand) Amornthep Valsang	9,225 pts	(Thailand) Teeruch Poparnich	9,150	(Philippines) Richard Otero	9,050
Vaults	(Malaysia) Kau Jit Kaur	9,200 pts	(Thailand) Teeruch Poparnich	9,162	(Thailand) Taweesak Puangmanee	9,125
Parallel bars	(Thailand) Amornthep Valsang	9,125 pts	(Thailand) Taweesak Puangmanee	9,000	(Indonesia) Jeffry Reza Sanger	8,900
Horizontal bar	(Thailand) Amornthep Valsang	9,250 pts	(Thailand) Taweesak Puangmanee	9,075	(Philippines) Wilfredo Bilog	9,050

=== Women's ===
Event	Gold		Silver		Bronze	
Women's Team	Thailand	174.71 pts	Indonesia	173.51	Philippines	171.39
Individual all-round	(Indonesia) Wuri Liliwati	35.99 pts	(Philippines) Catherine Ocampo	35.19	(Indonesia) Irma Febrianti	35.13
Vault	(Indonesia) Wuri Liliwati	9,250 pts	(Thailand) Panumas Surapranum	8,950	(Singapore) Jacquelyn Choy	8,875
Asymmetric bars	(Indonesia) Wuri Liliwati	9.10 pts	(Indonesia) Irma Febrianti	8.85	(Philippines) Jasmine Valenton	8.10
Balance beam	(Philippines) Jasmine Valenton	9,225 pts	(Indonesia) Januarumi	9,100	(Singapore) Chai So Lan	8,800
Floor exercise	(Thailand) Auamdhuan Phojan (Philippines) Catherine Ocampo	9.05 pts	no silver medal		(Indonesia) Wuri Liliwati	8.55

== Medal table ==
Rank	Nation	Gold	Silver	Bronze	Total
1	Thailand (THA)	8	8	3	19
2	Indonesia (INA)	3	3	4	10
3	Philippines (PHI)	3	2	5	10
4	Malaysia (MAS)	1	0	0	1
5	Singapore (SIN)	0	0	2	2
Totals (5 entries)		15	13	14	42
