= Fencing at the 1991 SEA Games =

- Venue: Valle Verde Country Club

Fencing events at the 1991 Southeast Asian Games was held between 25 November to 28 November at Valle Verde Country Club, Manila, Philippines.

== Medal table ==
Rank	Nation	Gold	Silver	Bronze	Total
1	Indonesia (INA)	8	1	2	11
2	Philippines (PHI)	1	3	2	6
3	Singapore (SIN)	0	3	3	6
4	Malaysia (MAS)	0	2	1	3
5	Thailand (THA)	0	0	5	5
Totals (5 entries)		9	9	13	31

== Medal summary ==
=== Men ===
Event	Gold	Silver	Bronze
Individual foil	(Philippines) Walter Torres	(Singapore) Ronald Tan	(Singapore) Wong Toon King (Philippines) Benny Garcia
Team foil	(Indonesia) INDONESIA	(Philippines) PHILIPPINES	
Individual sabre	(Indonesia) Yoshea Poerawinata	(Philippines) Anthony Diamus	(Indonesia) Gerardus Felix Bolang (Thailand) Naknil Chalermchorn
Team sabre	(Indonesia) INDONESIA	(Philippines) PHILIPPINES	(Thailand) THAILAND
Individual épée	(Indonesia) Yusmahadi	(Singapore) James Wong	(Indonesia) Johisoa Mauwa (Thailand) Charat Nonthakarn
Team épée			

=== Women's ===
Event	Gold	Silver	Bronze
Individual foil	(Indonesia) Erma Susana	(Indonesia) Christian Timisela	(Singapore) Teo Ah Heok (Thailand) Vuthivorakul Mayuree
Team foil	(Indonesia) INDONESIA	(Singapore) SINGAPORE	(Malaysia) MALAYSIA
Individual épée	(Indonesia) Sri Ayanti	(Malaysia) Janet Mah	(Thailand) Chutina Chettahpinit (Singapore) Teo Ah Heok
Team épée	(Indonesia) INDONESIA	(Malaysia) MALAYSIA	(Philippines) PHILIPPINES
