= Ratiporn Wong =

Thai swimmer

Personal information
- Born: 21 June 1972 (age 54)

Sport
- Sport: Swimming
Medal record
Representing Thailand
SEA Games
Gold medal – first place	1991 Manila	50m freestyle
Gold medal – first place	1991 Manila	100m freestyle
Gold medal – first place	1991 Manila	100m butterfly
Silver medal – second place	1991 Manila	200m freestyle
Silver medal – second place	1991 Manila	200m butterfly

Ratiporn Wong (born 21 June 1972) is a Thai swimmer. She competed in two events at the 1992 Summer Olympics.
