= Bowling at the 1991 SEA Games =

The Bowling at the 1991 SEA Games result. This event was held between 26 November to 2 December at Green Valley Country Club, Manila.

== Medal table ==
Rank	Nation	Gold	Silver	Bronze	Total
1	Philippines (PHI)	3	7	3	13
2	Thailand (THA)	3	0	1	4
3	Malaysia (MAS)	2	1	3	6
4	Singapore (SIN)	1	2	1	4
5	Indonesia (INA)	1	0	2	3
Totals (5 entries)		10	10	10	30

== Medal summary ==
=== Men's ===
Event	Gold		Silver		Bronze	
Single	(Philippines) Paeng Nepomuceno	1.269	(Philippines) Norman Gonzalez	1.265	(Thailand) Bunsong Numthuan	1.247
Doubles	(Philippines) George Fernandez (Philippines) Norman Gonzales	2.529 pts	(Philippines) Paeng Nepomuceno (Philippines) Paulo Valdez	2.507	(Malaysia) Ramli Bahroom (Malaysia) Raymond Siew	2.459
Trio	(Malaysia) Jimmy Lee (Malaysia) Ng Siew Hup (Malaysia) Raymond Siew	3.659 pts	(Philippines) Paeng Nepomuceno (Philippines) Paulo Valdez (Philippines) Jins Sablan	3.601	(Singapore) Jack Wong (Singapore) Ronnie Ng (Singapore) Sam Goh	3.464
Five	(Thailand) THAILAND	5.974 pts	(Singapore) SINGAPORE	5.750	(Philippines) PHILIPPINES	5.727
All events	(Philippines) Paulo Valdez	4.978 pts	(Philippines) Paeng Nepomuceno	4.909	(Philippines) Norman Gonzales	4.867

=== Women ===
Event	Gold		Silver		Bronze	
Single	(Indonesia) Poppy Tambis	1.185 pts	(Malaysia) Shirley Chow	1.176	(Malaysia) Doris Koo	1.139
Doubles	(Malaysia) Lisa Kwan (Malaysia) Shirley Chow	2.411 pts	(Philippines) Bong Coo (Philippines) Arianne Cerdeña	2.311	(Philippines) Lisa Fernandes (Philippines) Cathy Solis	2.280
Trio	(Thailand) THAILAND	3.370 pts	(Singapore) SINGAPORE	3.342	(Indonesia) INDONESIA	3.250
Five	(Singapore) SINGAPORE	5.326 pts	(Philippines) PHILIPPINES	5.262	Indonesia	5.248
All events	(Thailand) Pranee Kitipongpithaya	4.478 pts	(Philippines) Arianne Cerdeña	4.479	(Malaysia) Lisa Kwan	4.455
