= Eric Buhain =

Filipino swimmer

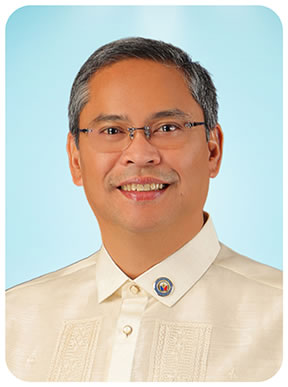
- Official portrait, 2022

Member of the Philippine House of Representatives from Batangas' 1st district
- In office June 30, 2022 – June 30, 2025
- Preceded by: Eileen Ermita-Buhain
- Succeeded by: Leandro Leviste

Executive Director of the Bureau of Immigration
- In office March 15, 2010 – October 2010
- President: Gloria Macapagal Arroyo; Benigno Aquino III

Chairman of the Games and Amusements Board
- In office June 8, 2005 – March 15, 2010
- President: Gloria Macapagal Arroyo
- Succeeded by: Juan Ramon Guanzon (OIC)

6th Chairman of the Philippine Sports Commission
- In office January 23, 2002 – June 8, 2005
- President: Gloria Macapagal Arroyo
- Preceded by: Carlos Tuazon
- Succeeded by: Butch Ramirez

Personal details
- Born: Joseph Eric Reyes Buhain; April 12, 1970 (age 56) Manila, Philippines
- Party: Nacionalista
- Spouse: Eileen Ermita (m. 1995)
- Education: La Salle University (BS); De La Salle Zobel
- Sports career
- Country: Philippines
- Sport: Aquatics
Medal record
Men's aquatics
Representing Philippines
Southeast Asian Games
Gold medal – first place	Bangkok 1985	400 m individual medley
Gold medal – first place	Jakarta 1987	200 m freestyle
Gold medal – first place	Jakarta 1987	100 m butterfly
Gold medal – first place	Jakarta 1987	200 m butterfly
Gold medal – first place	Jakarta 1987	400 m individual medley
Gold medal – first place	Kuala Lumpur 1989	200 m individual medley
Gold medal – first place	Kuala Lumpur 1989	400 m individual medley
Gold medal – first place	Manila 1991	100 m breastroke
Gold medal – first place	Manila 1991	100 m butterfly
Gold medal – first place	Manila 1991	200 m butterfly
Gold medal – first place	Manila 1991	200 m individual medley
Gold medal – first place	Manila 1991	400 m individual medley
Gold medal – first place	Singapore 1993	100 m butterfly
Silver medal – second place	Kuala Lumpur 1989	100 m butterfly
Silver medal – second place	Singapore 1993	100 m breastroke
Bronze medal – third place	Bangkok 1985	4×100 m medley relay
Bronze medal – third place	Bangkok 1985	200 m backstroke
Bronze medal – third place	Jakarta 1987	100 m freestyle
Bronze medal – third place	Jakarta 1987	100 m backstroke
Bronze medal – third place	Kuala Lumpur 1989	200 m freestyle

Eric Reyes Buhain (Tagalog: [buˈhaʔɪn]; born April 12, 1970) is a Filipino former competitive swimmer and politician who served as a Member of the House of Representatives for Batangas's 1st district from 2022 to 2025.

He won several medals in the Southeast Asian Games from 1985 to 1993, and participated in the 1988 and 1992 Summer Olympics. He later became a sports administrator. During the Arroyo administration, he served as chairman of the Philippine Sports Commission, chairman of the Games and Amusements Board, and an executive director of the Bureau of Immigration.

== Career ==
=== Competitive swimming ===
Eric ventured into swimming not because he dreamed of winning an Olympic gold medal, but because of his doctor's advice to improve his lungs. Eric was born with primary lung complex. He enrolled in a two-week swimming program at the age of seven. Yet his training was breached by another illness, hepatitis. However, this didn't stop him; a year later he was training again and taking the advance course in swimming, the competitive course, at age nine. It was at this age that he got into the varsity swimming team of De La Salle Santiago Zobel School and vowed to win a gold medal in the sport.

By 1981, he was a member of the Philippine Team and swam in the 400-meter individual medley at age eleven. But it was in his first Southeast Asian Games in 1985, held in Bangkok, Thailand, where he snatched the gold in the same category at the age of fifteen. He participated in the 1988 Summer Olympics and was also chosen as the country's flag bearer for the opening ceremonies.

In the 1989 Southeast Asian Games in Kuala Lumpur, Malaysia, Buhain broke one of the existing SEA Games swimming records. In the 1991 Southeast Asian Games, where the Philippines was the host, he made a huge contribution to the gold medal record of the host country by winning most of the events in swimming. He was chosen to represent the Philippines in the 1992 Summer Olympics. He didn't win any medals in that sporting event.

Even though he won several gold medals in the 1993 Southeast Asian Games, Buhain decided to retire from his swimming career. He was disappointed by the poor government management that led to a mediocre performance of the Philippines team in that sporting event.

=== Sports administration ===
Buhain spent his early career in sport administration as the national training director of the Philippine Amateur Swimming Association (PASA) and president of the Professional Swimming Coaches Academy of the Philippines (ProSCAP).

On January 23, 2002, President Gloria Macapagal-Arroyo appointed Buhain as the chairman of the Philippine Sports Commission after learning of the Philippines poor international ranking in sports. He instituted reforms that led to protests by some commissioners and employees. In 2003, the Philippines increased its rank in the medal tally in the Southeast Asian Games and the country won several medals in the 2002 Asian Games after getting only a bronze medal in the 1998 Asian Games.

Barely six months before the 2005 Southeast Asian Games, he was appointed by President Arroyo as the chairman of the Games and Amusement Board (GAB), a public agency that handles professional sporting and gambling events.

On March 15, 2010, he left the GAB when President Arroyo appointed him as a director of the Bureau of Immigration.

In 2023, Buhain was elected as general secretary of Philippine Swimming (later Philippine Aquatics)

=== Politics ===
In the 2022 elections, Buhain is a candidate for representative of Batangas' 1st district, the seat his wife is scheduled to vacate. He ran against his sister-in-law, Lisa Ermita, and won. He sought re-election in 2025, but lost to Leandro Leviste. He is being implicated in the anomalous flood control projects in his district during his term.

== Personal life ==
The oldest child of former Bacoor, Cavite municipal vice mayor Cecilia Reyes-Buhain, Buhain finished his elementary and secondary education at the De La Salle Santiago Zobel School in Ayala Alabang. In 1991, he earned his Bachelor of Science degree in finance at La Salle University in Philadelphia, United States.

Buhain is the husband of former Representative Eileen Ermita-Buhain of the 1st district of Batangas, and the son-in-law of former Executive Secretary Eduardo Ermita.

Buhain is the older sibling of Camille Buhain-Javier, one of the three women-lawyers behind the Filipino YouTube channel, The Soshal Network.

== Electoral history ==
Electoral history of Eric Buhain
Year	Office	Party	Votes received				Result
Year	Office	Party	Total	%	P.	Swing	Result
2022	Representative (Batangas–1st)	Nacionalista	143,705	45.29%	1st	—N/a	Won
2025	Representative (Batangas–1st)	Nacionalista	91,588	25.42%	2nd	—N/a	Lost

== Honors and awards ==
- Philippine Sports Hall of Fame: 2021
- PSA Athlete of the Year: 1987, 1991
