= Eydis Konráðsdóttir =

Icelandic swimmer

Personal information
- Full name: Eydis Konráðsdóttir
- National team: Iceland
- Born: 16 February 1978 (age 48) Keflavík, Iceland
- Height: 1.69 m (5 ft 6 1/2 in)
- Weight: 57 kg (126 lb)

Sport
- Sport: Swimming
- Strokes: Butterfly
- Club: Keflavík Íþrótta-og Ungmennafélag

Eydis Konráðsdóttir (born February 16, 1978) is a former swimmer from Iceland, who specialized in sprint butterfly events.

== Career ==
She represented Iceland in two editions of the Olympic Games (1996 and 2000), and also held an Icelandic record in the 100 m butterfly until it was later broken by Kolbrún Yr Kristjánsdóttir and Sarah Blake Bateman within the 2000s decade. Konradsdottir is a medicine undergraduate at the University of New South Wales, and also married to Australia's medley swimmer and three-time Olympian Matthew Dunn.

Konradsdottir made her first Icelandic team, as an eighteen-year-old junior, at the 1996 Summer Olympics in Atlanta, where she competed in the 100 m butterfly. Swimming in heat three, she picked up a fifth seat and twenty-ninth overall in 1:03.41.

At the 2000 Summer Olympics in Sydney, Konradsdottir competed again in the 100 m butterfly. She achieved a FINA B-cut of 1:02.93 from the Mare Nostrum Meet in Canet-en-Roussillon, France. She challenged seven other swimmers in heat three, including Thailand's three-time Olympian Praphalsai Minpraphal. She posted a seventh-place time of 1:03.27 in her own race to edge out Trinidad and Tobago's Siobhan Cropper by 0.07 seconds. Konradsdottir failed to advance into the semifinals, as she placed thirty-ninth overall on the first day of prelims.
