= Mariya Ohurtsova =

Ukrainian swimmer (born 1983)

Personal information
- Full name: Mariya Ohurtsova
- National team: Ukraine
- Born: 4 January 1983 (age 43) Zaporizhia, Ukrainian SSR, Soviet Union
- Height: 1.73 m (5 ft 8 in)
- Weight: 56 kg (123 lb)

Sport
- Sport: Swimming
- Strokes: Butterfly
- Club: Ukraïna Zaporizhzhia

Mariya Ohurtsova (Ukrainian: Марія Огурцова; born 4 January 1983 in Zaporizhia) is a Ukrainian former swimmer, who specialized in sprint butterfly events. She represented Ukraine, as a 17-year-old, at the 2000 Summer Olympics, and also trained for the Ukraïna Zaporizhzhia swim team during her sporting career.

Ohurtsova competed only in the women's 100 m butterfly at the 2000 Summer Olympics in Sydney. She achieved a FINA B-cut of 1:02.23 from the Ukrainian National Championships in Kyiv. She challenged seven other swimmers in heat three, including Thailand's three-time Olympian Praphalsai Minpraphal. Coming from fifth at the final turn, Ohurtsova faded down the stretch to pick up a sixth place in 1:03.00, almost a full second below her entry standard. Ohurtsova failed to advance into the semifinals, as she placed thirty-eighth overall on the first day of prelims.
