= Judo at the 1991 SEA Games =

The Judo at the 1991 Southeast Asian Games was held between 26 November to 30 November 1991 at Rizal Memorial Sports Complex Manila, Philippines.

== Medal table ==
Rank	Nation	Gold	Silver	Bronze	Total
1	Indonesia (INA)	8	4	0	12
2	Thailand (THA)	3	0	6	9
3	Philippines (PHI)	1	3	4	8
4	Myanmar (MYA)	0	4	2	6
5	Singapore (SIN)	0	1	1	2
Totals (5 entries)		12	12	13	37

== Medal summary ==
=== Men ===
Event	Gold	Silver	Bronze
Half light-weight	(Thailand) Khajornsuk Komargama	(Myanmar) Thein Uin	(Philippines) Danilo Crosby
Light-weight	(Indonesia) Yudhi Sulistianto	(Philippines) Rexberto Ramirez	(Myanmar) Kyaw Nyunt
Half middle-weight	(Philippines) John Baylon	(Indonesia) Henry Prasetyo	(Thailand) Bancha Thanamkhet
Middle-weight	(Indonesia) Quentung Putro Setiano	(Myanmar) Than Maung	(Thailand) Pallop Jamsawang
Half heavy-weight	(Indonesia) Hengky Pie	(Philippines) Mark Oliver de Castro	(Thailand) Pitak Kampitak
Heavy-weight	(Indonesia) Perrence Pantouw	(Singapore) Ho Yen Chye	(Thailand) Narin Suppawet
Open	(Indonesia) Ceto Cosadek	(Indonesia) Hengky Pie	(Singapore) Ho Yen Chye (Philippines) John Baylon

=== Women ===
Event	Gold	Silver	Bronze
Half light-weight	(Indonesia) Sugiati	(Myanmar) Kyi Kyi Wai	(Philippines) Loreta Mendoza
Light-weight	(Thailand) Prateep Pinthong	(Indonesia) Erna Yantianingsih	(Myanmar) Hla Hla Myint
Middle-weight	(Indonesia) Helena Papilaya	(Philippines) Julie Manalo	(Thailand) Waksana Sokniran
Half heavy-weight	(Indonesia) Pujawati Utama	(Myanmar) Tin Tin Maw	(Thailand) Soonluck Kerdnanee
Heavy-weight	(Thailand) Supatra Yompakdee	(Indonesia) Linia Tri Astuti	(Philippines) Hiyas Gapit
