= Sornsawan Phuvichit =

Thai swimmer (born 1973)

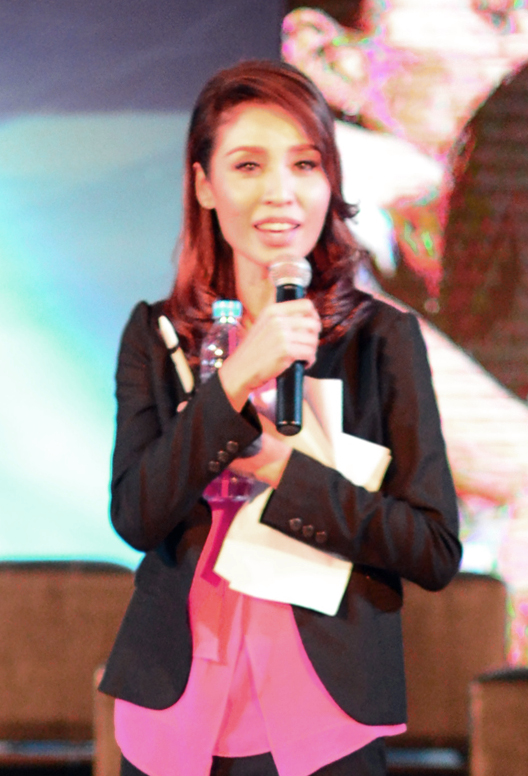
- Sornsawan Phuvichit in 2013

Personal information
- Born: 16 February 1973 (age 53)
- Height: 1.68 m (5 ft 6 in)
- Weight: 56 kg (123 lb)
- Spouse: Tony Meechai
- Children: 1

Sport
- Sport: Swimming
Medal record
Representing Thailand
SEA Games
Gold medal – first place	1987 Jakarta	100m breaststroke
Gold medal – first place	1987 Jakarta	200m breaststroke
Gold medal – first place	1989 Kuala Lumpur	100m breaststroke
Gold medal – first place	1989 Kuala Lumpur	200m breaststroke
Gold medal – first place	1991 Manila	100m breaststroke
Gold medal – first place	1991 Manila	200m breaststroke

Sornsawan Phuvichit (Thai: ศรสวรรค์ ภู่วิจิตร; born 16 February 1973) is a retired Thai breaststroke swimmer who won several gold medals at the South East Asian Games in 1987–1991. She competed at the 1992 Summer Olympics in the 100 m and 200 m breaststroke events, but failed to reach the finals. After retiring from swimming, she worked as a news anchor with Channel 7.

Phuvichit is married and has a daughter.
