= Wirmandi Sugriat =

Indonesian swimmer (born 1971)

Personal information
- Born: 5 August 1971 (age 54)

Sport
- Sport: Swimming
Medal record
Representing Indonesia
Asian Games
Bronze medal – third place	1986 Seoul	200m breaststroke
Bronze medal – third place	1986 Seoul	4x100m medley relay
Bronze medal – third place	1990 Beijing	200m breaststroke
SEA Games
Gold medal – first place	1987 Jakarta	100m breaststroke
Gold medal – first place	1987 Jakarta	200m breaststroke
Gold medal – first place	1989 Kuala Lumpur	200m breaststroke
Silver medal – second place	1989 Kuala Lumpur	100m breaststroke
Silver medal – second place	1991 Manila	100m breaststroke
Silver medal – second place	1991 Manila	200m breaststroke
Bronze medal – third place	1989 Kuala Lumpur	200m individual medley

Wirmandi Sugriat (born 5 August 1971) is an Indonesian swimmer. He competed in four events at the 1988 Summer Olympics.
