= Leo Najera =

Filipino swimmer

Personal information
- Born: 14 July 1971 (age 54)

Sport
- Sport: Swimming
Medal record
Representing Philippines
SEA Games
Gold medal – first place	1991 Manila	200m backstroke
Silver medal – second place	1989 Kuala Lumpur	100m backstroke
Silver medal – second place	1993 Singapore	100m backstroke

Leo Najera (born 14 July 1971) is a Filipino swimmer. He competed in three events at the 1992 Summer Olympics.
