= Akiko Thomson =

Filipino swimmer

Akiko Thomson OLY
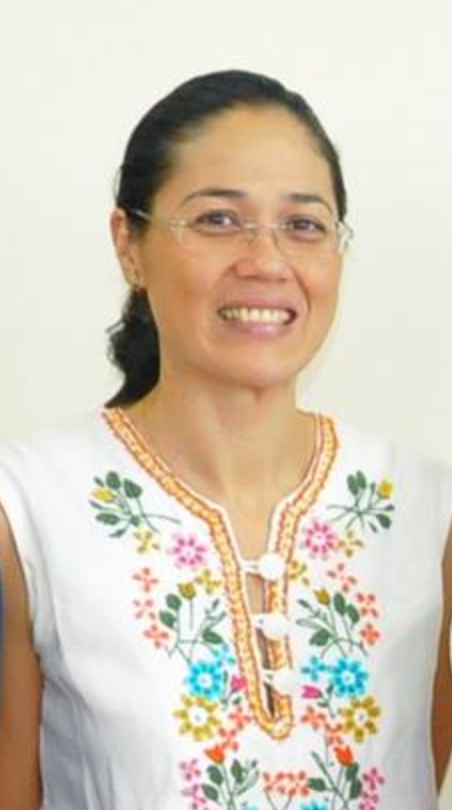
- Thomson in 2013

Personal information
- Full name: Gillian Akiko Nakamura Thomson-Guevara
- National team: Philippines
- Born: Gillian Akiko Nakamura Thomson; October 8, 1974 (age 51) Washington, D.C., U.S.
- Spouse: Samuel Guevara (m. 2009)

Sport
- Sport: Swimming
- Strokes: Backstroke, freestyle
- College team: University of California, Berkeley
Medal record
Women's swimming
Representing the Philippines
Southeast Asian Games
Gold medal – first place	1987 Jakarta	100 m backstroke
Silver medal – second place	1987 Jakarta	200 m backstroke
Gold medal – first place	1989 Kuala Lumpur	50 m freestyle
Gold medal – first place	1989 Kuala Lumpur	100 m freestyle
Gold medal – first place	1989 Kuala Lumpur	100 m backstroke
Silver medal – second place	1989 Kuala Lumpur	200 m backstroke
Gold medal – first place	1991 Manila	100 m backstroke
Gold medal – first place	1991 Manila	200 m backstroke
Silver medal – second place	1991 Manila	50 m freestyle
Silver medal – second place	1991 Manila	100 m freestyle
Gold medal – first place	1993 Singapore	100 m backstroke
Gold medal – first place	1993 Singapore	200 m backstroke

Gillian Akiko Nakamura Thomson-Guevara (born October 8, 1974) is a Filipina television host, journalist and retired swimmer.

She is the most accomplished Filipina swimmer in the Southeast Asian Games having won eight gold medals in the biennial multi-sport meet between 1987 and 1993.

== Early life and education ==
Gillian Akiko Nakamura Thomson was born on October 8, 1974 in Washington, D.C., in the United States. The youngest of three children, Akiko was born to a Japanese mother from Hiroshima, Hiroko Nakamura, and an American father, James Marsh Thomson.

When she was young, she and her family moved to Manila where her father, who had previous experience with the United States Office of Naval Intelligence, became the executive director of the American Chamber of Commerce of the Philippines in the 1970s.

Thomson entered the University of California, Berkeley after taking part in the 1992 Summer Olympics. She graduated with a major in anthropology and a minor in theater. She took her master's degree in Business Administration at the Ateneo de Manila University.

== Career ==
Thomson began swimming at the age of six at the Manila Army and Navy Club where her family had lived nearby. She became part of the club's swimming team.

Thomson was invited to join the Philippine national team when she was 10 years old. She started to represent the Philippines in several swimming competitions locally and abroad after becoming a naturalized Filipino citizen through Presidential Decree No. 1983 issued in 1985.

Among the tournaments she competed in are the 1987, 1989, 1991 and 1993 South East Asian Games, where she won eight gold medals in total, and also in three editions of the Summer Olympic Games in 1988, 1992 and 1996.

She was also co-captain of the California Golden Bears swimming team on her senior year at University of California, Berkeley.

== Post-retirement ==
After her retirement from competitive swimming, she became a television host and journalist with Probe Productions at ABS-CBN.

She opened the Akiko Thomson Swimming School at the Colegio San Agustin – Makati in 2011.

Thomson served as a commissioner at the Philippine Sports Commission from 2010 to 2016. She was elected as president of the Philippine Olympians Association in 2015, following the death of Art Macapagal. Motivated by her daughter's condition, she also become involved in Special Olympics Pilipinas as its chairperson and president.

== Personal life ==
Thomson is married to Samuel "Chips" Guevara since June 2009. They have two sons and a daughter who has Down syndrome.

== Filmography ==
=== Television ===
- Game Plan – co-host (2001–2006)
- Probe
