= Praphalsai Minpraphal =

Thai swimmer (born 1978)

Personal information
- Full name: Praphalsai Minpraphal
- Nickname: Waen
- National team: Thailand
- Born: 7 January 1978 (age 48) Bangkok, Thailand
- Height: 1.64 m (5 ft 4 1/2 in)
- Weight: 57 kg (126 lb)

Sport
- Sport: Swimming
- Strokes: Backstroke, butterfly, medley
- Club: Bolles School Sharks (U.S.)
- College team: University of California, Berkeley (U.S.)
- Coach: Teri McKeever (U.S.)
Medal record
Women's swimming
Representing Thailand
Southeast Asian Games
Gold medal – first place	1995 Chiang Mai	100 m backstroke
Gold medal – first place	1995 Chiang Mai	200 m backstroke
Gold medal – first place	1999 Chiang Mai	200 m butterfly
Gold medal – first place	1995 Chiang Mai	400 m medley
Gold medal – first place	1999 Brunei	100 m butterfly
Gold medal – first place	1999 Brunei	200 m butterfly
Silver medal – second place	1995 Chiang Mai	200 m medley

Praphalsai "Waen" Minpraphal (Thai: ประพาฬสาย มินประพาฬ; born January 7, 1978) is a Thai former swimmer, who specialized in butterfly, but also competed in backstroke and individual medley. She represented Thailand in all three editions of the Olympic Games since 1992, and earned numerous medals in her own specialties at the Southeast Asian Games since 1991. While residing in the United States on her college career, she helped the California Golden Bears set a new world record (1:49.23) and capture the 4×50 m medley title at the 2000 NCAA Women's Swimming and Diving Championships. Minpraphal is among the Asian swimmers, along with Joscelin Yeo of Singapore and Akiko Thomson of the Philippines, to train for the Bears under women's head coach Teri McKeever.

== Career ==
=== Early years ===
Minpraphal made her official worldwide debut, as a 14-year-old, at the 1992 Summer Olympics in Barcelona. She failed to reach the top 16 final in any of her individual events, finishing forty-second in the 200 m backstroke (2:26.32), thirty-seventh in the 100 m butterfly (1:04.28), twenty-fifth in the 200 m butterfly (2:20.48), thirtieth in the 200 m individual medley (2:23.24), and twenty-eighth in the 400 m individual medley (5:04.95).

Shortly after her first Games, Minpraphal accepted an athletic scholarship to attend the Bolles School in Jacksonville, Florida, United States, and train for Gregg Troy for the Sharks Swim Club. While swimming for Bolles, she established a school record in the 100-yard backstroke (55.99), and also captured meet titles in the backstroke (both 100 and 200 yards) and individual medley double (both 200 and 400 yards) during her entire high school season.

=== College career ===
After graduating from the Bolles School, Minpraphal attended the University of California, Berkeley in Berkeley, California, where she majored in economics and played for the California Golden Bears women's swimming and diving team, under world-class and head coach Teri McKeever, from 1996 to 2000. During her college career, she posted career bests in the 100-yard butterfly (54.54), 200-yard butterfly (1:58.58), and 400-yard individual medley (4:13.78), and received a total of twelve All-American honors. At the 2000 NCAA Women's Swimming and Diving Championships in Indianapolis, Indiana, during her senior year, Minpraphal shared a 200-yard medley title with Joscelin Yeo, Haley Cope, and Staciana Stitts in a short-course world record of 1:49.23.

=== International career ===
Competing for Thailand internationally, Minpraphal broke national records in the backstroke, butterfly, and medley double. When her nation hosted the 1995 Southeast Asian Games in Chiang Mai, she won a total of five medals: four golds each in the 100 m backstroke (1:04.87), 200 m backstroke (2:19.02), 200 m butterfly (2:15.60), and 400 m individual medley (4:54.24); and a silver in the 200 m individual medley (2:19.88).

At the 1996 Summer Olympics in Atlanta, Minpraphal built a monstrous program of six swimming events. She placed twenty-first in the 100 m backstroke (1:04.61), thirtieth in the 200 m backstroke (2:21.82), twenty-eighth in the 100 m butterfly (1:03.35), twenty-fifth in the 200 m butterfly (1:03.35), thirty-fourth in the 200 m individual medley (2:22.34), and twenty-seventh in the 400 m individual medley (4:58.33).

Three years later, at the 1999 Southeast Asian Games in Bandar Seri Begawan, Brunei, Minpraphal enjoyed the race of her life as she took home two golds in the 100 m butterfly (1:01.16) and in the 200 m butterfly (2:14.54).

Minpraphal swam for her third Thai team in the 100 m butterfly at the 2000 Summer Olympics in Sydney. After winning two titles from the SEA Games, her entry time of 1:01.16 was officially accredited under a FINA B-standard. She challenged seven other swimmers in heat three, including Ukraine's 17-year-old Mariya Ohurtsova, two-time Olympians Lee Bo-eun of South Korea and Eydis Konráðsdóttir of Iceland. Entering the race with a fastest-seeded time, Minpraphal held off a sprint battle from Ohurtsova to pick up a fifth spot by a hundredth of a second (0.01) in a time of 1:02.99. Minpraphal failed to advance into the semifinals, as she placed thirty-seventh overall on the first day of prelims.

== See also ==
- California Golden Bears
- List of University of California, Berkeley alumni
