= 1989 SEA Games =

Multi-sport event in Kuala Lumpur, Malaysia

15th Southeast Asian Games
- Host city: Kuala Lumpur, Malaysia
- Motto: Now is the time (Malay: Kini Saatnya)
- Nations: 9
- Events: 25 sports
- Opening: 20 August 1989
- Closing: 31 August 1989
- Opened by: Azlan Shah; Yang di-Pertuan Agong
- Torch lighter: Sharuddin Ali; Sylvia Ng
- Ceremony venue: Stadium Merdeka

The 1989 Southeast Asian Games (Malay: Sukan Asia Tenggara 1989), officially known as the 15th Southeast Asian Games, were a multi-sport event held in Kuala Lumpur, Malaysia from 20 to 31 August 1989 with 25 sports featured in the games. It was officially opened by 9th Yang di-Pertuan Agong, Sultan Azlan Shah. Although Cambodia did not participate, Laos returned to compete for the first time under the new federation name in this edition of the games, while Vietnam fields their own delegation to the event for the first time as a unified country.

The closing ceremony of this regional meet coincides with the 32nd anniversary of Malaysia's independence. This was the fourth time that Malaysia played as hosts to these games, the country had previously hosted the event in 1965 and 1971, when the event was still known as the Southeast Asian Peninsular (SEAP) Games at those times, and in 1977, in which this edition was the first to bear the games' present name, which reflects the admission of Brunei, Indonesia, and the Philippines to the Southeast Asian Games during that year.

The games was opened and closed by Sultan Azlan Shah, the King of Malaysia at the Stadium Merdeka. The final medal tally was led by Indonesia, followed by host Malaysia and Thailand.

== Venues ==
State/Terittory	Venue	Sports
Kuala Lumpur	Stadium Merdeka	Ceremonies, Athletics, Football (final)
Kuala Lumpur	Stadium Negara	Basketball, Badminton
Kuala Lumpur	Bandar Tun Razak Stadium	Football
Kuala Lumpur	Cheras Aquatic Centre	Swimming, Diving, Water polo
Kuala Lumpur	Jalan Duta Tennis Complex	Tennis
Kuala Lumpur	Kampo Hall	Bodybuilding, Weightlifting
Kuala Lumpur	Kuala Lumpur Badminton Stadium	Badminton, Sepak takraw
Kuala Lumpur	National Electric Board Sport Complex	Table tennis, Taekwondo
Kuala Lumpur	Tun Razak Hockey Stadium	Field hockey
Kuala Lumpur	University of Malaya Rugby Field	Archery
Selangor	BSN Stadium Bangi	Football
Selangor	Dewan Tun Abdul Razak UKM	Gymnastics
Selangor	Kelab Darul Ehsan	Fencing
Selangor	Kent Bowl Asiajaya	Bowling
Selangor	Petaling Jaya Civic Center	Judo
Selangor	Petronas Sport Complex Bangi	Karate, Pencak Silat
Selangor	Saujana Golf and Country Club	Golf
Selangor	Subang Shooting Range	Shooting
Negeri Sembilan	Seremban Town Hall	Boxing
Perak	Velodrome Rakyat	Cycling (track)
Perak	Lumut Naval Base	Rowing (Traditional boat race)
Perak	Indera Mulia Hall	Volleyball
Perak	Pangkor Island	Sailing

== Marketing ==
=== Sponsors ===
- Panasonic
- Coca-Cola
- IBM Mesiniaga
- Magnum Corporation
- Milo
- Malaysia Airlines
- Fujifilm
- Asics
- Seiko
- Genting Group
- Telekom Malaysia
- Aliph
- Sports Toto

=== Mascot ===
The official 1989 SEA Games mascot was an anthropomorphic turtle named Johan.

=== Logo ===
The logo for the Games features 6 elliptical rings alternately colored red and blue to form a shape that resembles a spinning top, or locally called gasing.

=== Songs ===
"Reach for the sky" ("Kini Saatnya" in Malay) was the official theme song of the 1989 Southeast Asian Games. It was sung in English by Francissca Peter and in Malay by Jay Jay.

== The games ==
=== Participating nations ===
- Brunei
- Indonesia
- Laos
- Malaysia (Host)
- Myanmar
- Philippines
- Singapore
- Thailand
- Vietnam

=== Sports ===
- Aquatics
- Archery
- Athletics
- Badminton
- Basketball
- Bodybuilding
- Bowling
- Boxing
- Cycling
- Fencing
- Field hockey
- Football
- Golf
- Judo
- Karate
- Pencak silat
- Rowing
- Sailing
- Sepak takraw
- Shooting
- Table tennis
- Taekwondo
- Tennis
- Volleyball
- Weightlifting

== Medal table ==
A total of 957 medals, comprising 303 Gold medals, 302 Silver medals and 352 Bronze medals were awarded to athletes. The host Malaysia's performance was their best ever yet in Southeast Asian Games History and were placed only second to Indonesia as overall champion.

Key

* Host nation (Malaysia)

Rank	Nation	Gold	Silver	Bronze	Total
1	Indonesia (INA)	102	78	71	251
2	Malaysia (MAS)*	67	58	75	200
3	Thailand (THA)	62	63	66	191
4	Singapore (SIN)	32	38	47	117
5	Philippines (PHI)	26	37	64	127
6	Myanmar (MYA)	10	14	20	44
7	Vietnam (VIE)	3	11	5	19
8	Brunei (BRU)	1	2	4	7
9	Laos (LAO)	0	1	0	1
Totals (9 entries)		303	302	352	957

Preceded by Jakarta	Southeast Asian Games; Kuala Lumpur; XV Southeast Asian Games (1989)	Succeeded by Manila
