= 1993 SEA Games =

Multi-sport event in Singapore

17th Southeast Asian Games
- Host city: Singapore
- Nations: 9
- Events: 29 sports
- Opening: 12 June 1993
- Closing: 20 June 1993
- Opened by: Wee Kim Wee; President of Singapore
- Closed by: Wee Kim Wee; President of Singapore
- Torch lighter: Grace Young
- Ceremony venue: Singapore National Stadium

The 1993 Southeast Asian Games, officially known as the 17th Southeast Asian Games, were a multi-sport event held in Singapore from 12 to 20 June 1993 with 29 sports featured in this edition. The games were opened by Wee Kim Wee, the President of Singapore. This was the third time Singapore hosted the games, after 1983 and 1973 competition. The final medal tally was led by Indonesia, followed by Thailand, the Philippines and host Singapore.

== Development and preparation ==
An organizing committee for the Games was formed with Yeo Ning Hong as the president.

=== Venues ===
Venue	Sports
National Stadium	Opening and Closing Ceremony, Athletics, Football
Bedok Sports Hall	Judo, Karate
Changi Coast Road	Cycling
Changi Sailing Club	Sailing
Clementi Sports Hall	Fencing
Delta Sports Hall	Badminton (preliminaries), Basketball
Delta Hockey Pitch	Hockey
Geylang Indoor Stadium	Boxing
Gloucester Archery Range	Archery
Hougang Sports Hall	Gymnastics
Jurong Stadium	Football
Kallang Squash Center	Squash
Kallang Tennis Center	Tennis
Kallang Theatre	Bodybuilding
Marina Bay	Traditional boat race
Mount Vernon Range	Shooting (rifle)
Rifle Range Road Camp	Shooting (trap and skeet)
Singapore Civil Defence HQ	Shooting (pistol)
Singapore Badminton Hall	Sepak takraw
Singapore Billiards and Snooker Council	Billiards and snooker
Singapore Indoor Stadium	Badminton
Singapore Island Country Club	Golf
Tampines Sports Hall	Weightlifting
Toa Payoh Sports Hall	Table tennis
Toa Payoh Swimming Complex	Diving, Swimming, Water polo
Victor’s Superbowl	Bowling
Woodlands Sports Hall	Volleyball
Yio Chu Kang Sports Hall	Pencak silat, Wushu
Yishun Sports Hall	Taekwondo

== Marketing ==
=== Logo ===
Singa, the lion, the official mascot of the games.

The logo of the 1993 Southeast Asian Games is an image of a lion, which represents Singapore with the nickname, the lion city as the host of the 1993 Southeast Asian Games. The colours of the lion, blue, yellow, red, black and green are colours of the Olympic movement and represents the Olympic and sportsmanship spirit of the participating athletes in which the important thing is not to win, but to take part. The six-ring chain, the logo of the Southeast Asian Games Federation, represents the six founding nations of the Southeast Asian Games and the Southeast Asian Games itself.

=== Mascot ===
The mascot of the 1993 Southeast Asian Games is a lion named Singa. It has heart-shaped mane, snout and tail which represent the hearty welcome of athletes to the city.

=== Torch ===
The torch of the 1993 Southeast Asian games resembles that of a sword mounted with a lion's head.

== The Games ==
=== Participating nations ===
- Brunei
- Indonesia
- Laos
- Malaysia
- Myanmar
- Philippines
- Singapore (Host)
- Thailand
- Vietnam

=== Sports ===
- Archery
- Athletics
- Aquatics
- Badminton
- Basketball
- Billiards and snooker
- Bodybuilding
- Bowling
- Boxing
- Cycling
- Fencing
- Football
- Golf
- Gymnastics
- Hockey
- Judo
- Karate
- Pencak silat
- Sailing
- Sepak takraw
- Shooting
- Squash
- Table tennis
- Taekwondo
- Tennis
- Traditional boat race
- Volleyball
- Weightlifting
- Wushu

== Medal table ==
A total of 1048 medals, comprising 319 Gold medals, 318 Silver medals and 411 Bronze medals were awarded to athletes. The host Singapore's performance was their best to date and placed fourth overall amongst participating nations.

* Host nation (Singapore)

Rank	Nation	Gold	Silver	Bronze	Total
1	Indonesia (INA)	88	81	84	253
2	Thailand (THA)	63	70	63	196
3	Philippines (PHI)	57	59	72	188
4	Singapore (SIN)*	50	40	74	164
5	Malaysia (MAS)	43	45	65	153
6	Vietnam (VIE)	9	6	19	34
7	Myanmar (MYA)	8	13	16	37
8	Brunei (BRU)	1	3	18	22
9	Laos (LAO)	0	1	0	1
Totals (9 entries)		319	318	411	1,048

== Broadcasting ==
Country	Official broadcasters	Television broadcast
Hong Kong	Asia Television	ATV Home
Indonesia	Televisi Republik Indonesia	TVRI
Philippines	ABS-CBN; Intercontinental Broadcasting Corporation	ABS-CBN 2 IBC 13
Singapore	Singapore Broadcasting Corporation	SBC 12

Preceded by Manila	Southeast Asian Games; Singapore; XVII Southeast Asian Games (1993)	Succeeded by Chiang Mai
