= 1991 SEA Games =

Multi-sport event in Manila, Philippines

16th Southeast Asian Games
- Host city: Manila, Philippines
- Motto: "Nine Nations, Under an Asian Sun"
- Nations: 9
- Events: 28 sports
- Opening: 24 November 1991
- Closing: 5 December 1991
- Opened by: Corazon Aquino; President of the Philippines
- Athlete's Oath: Jasmin Valenton
- Torch lighter: Carlos Loyzaga; Lydia de Vega; Gerard Cantada
- Ceremony venue: Rizal Memorial Stadium

The 1991 Southeast Asian Games, officially known as the 16th Southeast Asian Games, were a multi-sport event held in Manila, the Philippines, from 24 November to 5 December 1991, with 28 sports featured in the games. This was the second time that the country hosted the games and its first since 1981. It was officially opened by President Corazon Aquino at the Rizal Memorial Stadium in Manila through a colorful opening ceremony. It was the only SEA Games at that time where the overall championship was heavily contested. The deciding medal came from the last sporting event - women's marathon where Indonesia got the gold medal.

Fourteen years after the 1991 SEA Games, the country hosted the 2005 SEA Games. Another 14 years later, the Philippines hosted the 2019 SEA Games, which is the first that the event took place in the whole country.

== Marketing ==
=== Logo ===
The logo of 1991 Southeast Asian Games was designed by Ernesto A. Calaguas. The logo features a Vinta, a traditional outrigger boat in the island of Mindanao. It also features the six-ring chain, the logo of the Southeast Asian Games Federations. It represents the six founding countries.

=== Mascot ===
The mascot for the Games is a colorful fowl called Kiko Labuyo.

=== Theme Song ===
The theme song, "Nine Countries Under An Asian Sun", was composed by Sammy Climaco with the Lyrics written by Alex Arrellano.

== Development and preparation ==
=== Venues ===
Venue	Sports
Rizal Memorial Sports Complex
Rizal Memorial Stadium	Athletics, Football, Ceremonies
Ninoy Aquino Stadium	Volleyball, Wushu
Rizal Memorial Coliseum	Taekwondo
Rizal Memorial Swimming Pool	Aquatics
Rizal Memorial Tennis Center	Tennis
Sports Medicine Building	Billiards and snooker
Metro Manila Venues
Amoranto Velodrome	Cycling (track)
Araneta Coliseum	Basketball
Ateneo Gymnasium	Sepak takraw
Camp Crame Gymnasium	Badminton
Philippine Marine Corps Range	Shooting
Green Valley Country Club	Bowling
Makati Sports Club	Squash
Manila Polo Club	Archery
Manila Yacht Club	Sailing
Philippine Village Hotel	Bodybuilding
Rosario Sports Complex	Softball
Folk Arts Theater	Boxing
ULTRA	Karate, Table Tennis
UP Gymnasium	Weightlifting
Valle Verde Country Club	Fencing
Rizal Province
Antipolo	Cycling (road race)
Valley Golf and Country Club	Golf

== The Games ==
=== Participating nations ===
- Brunei
- Indonesia
- Laos
- Malaysia
- Myanmar
- Philippines (Host)
- Singapore
- Thailand
- Vietnam

=== Sports ===
- Aquatics
- Archery
- Athletics
- Badminton
- Basketball
- Billiards and snooker
- Bodybuilding
- Bowling
- Boxing
- Cycling
- Fencing
- Football
- Golf
- Gymnastics
- Judo
- Karate
- Rowing
- Sailing
- Sepak takraw
- Shooting
- Softball
- Squash
- Table tennis
- Taekwondo
- Tennis
- Volleyball
- Weightlifting
- Wushu

== Medal table ==
Key

* Host nation (Philippines)

Rank	Nation	Gold	Silver	Bronze	Total
1	Indonesia (INA)	92	87	67	246
2	Philippines (PHI)*	91	62	86	239
3	Thailand (THA)	72	80	69	221
4	Malaysia (MAS)	36	38	66	140
5	Singapore (SIN)	18	32	45	95
6	Myanmar (MYA)	12	16	29	57
7	Vietnam (VIE)	7	12	10	29
8	Brunei (BRU)	0	0	8	8
9	Laos (LAO)	0	0	0	0
Totals (9 entries)		328	327	380	1,035

== Concerns and controversies ==
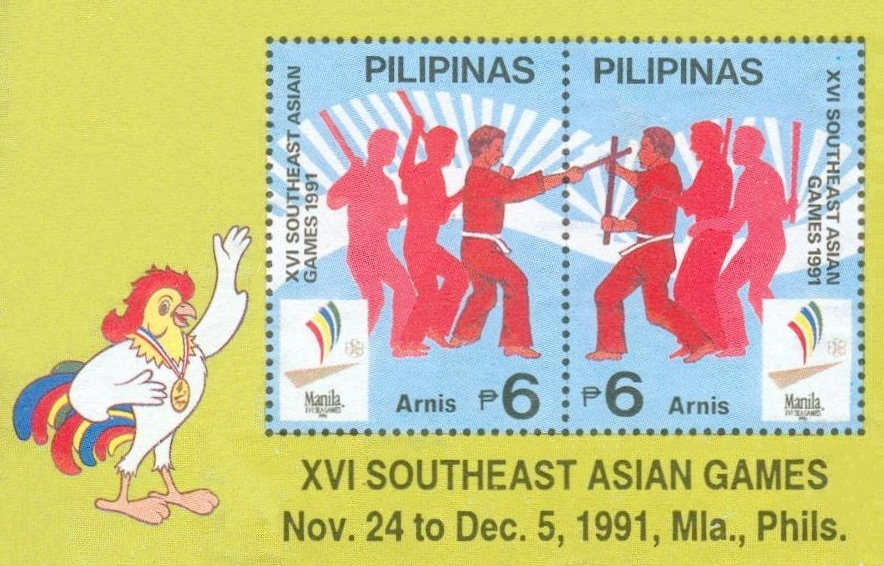
1991 Southeast Asian Games

Reduction of gold medals

The Philippines should have tallied a total of 91 gold medals, but one of the gold medals from boxing was proclaimed unofficial. The said gold medal should have been fought by a Filipino boxer against a Thai boxer, but the latter was found positive in the doping tests. The gold medal was, at first, given to the Philippines, but after a few days, the SEAG Organizing Committee declared that there will be no gold and silver medalists for the said event in boxing because there was no battle fought.

== Main official host television broadcasting ==
Country	Official broadcasters	Television broadcast
Brunei	Radio Television Brunei	RTB 5 RTB 8
Indonesia	Televisi Republik Indonesia	TVRI
Malaysia	Radio Televisyen Malaysia	RTM TV1
Philippines	ABS-CBN; People's Television Network; Radio Philippines Network; Intercontinental Broadcasting Corporation	ABS-CBN 2 PTV 4 New Vision 9 Islands TV 13
Singapore	Singapore Broadcasting Corporation	SBC 12
Thailand	Television Pool of Thailand	
Vietnam	Vietnam Television	VTV1

== See also ==
- 2005 SEA Games
- 2019 SEA Games

Preceded by Kuala Lumpur	Southeast Asian Games; Manila; XVI Southeast Asian Games (1991)	Succeeded by Singapore
