= Venues of the 1960 Summer Olympics =

1960 Summer Olympics sports venues

For the 1960 Summer Olympics, a total of thirty-four sports venues were used. The Basilica of Maxentius, the Baths of Caracalla, the Appian Way, and Via Cassia were among the ancient Roman venues used for the games. The football stadium in Florence hosted the 1934 FIFA World Cup and would later host the 1990 FIFA World Cup. Stadio Olimpico would later serve host to the 1987 IAAF World Championships in Athletics and the final venue for the 1990 FIFA World Cup. The marathon would be lit at night by Italian soldiers holding torches that included the Appian Way with a finish at the Arch of Constantine.

== Venues ==
Venue	Sports	Capacity	Ref.
Acqua Santa Golf Club Course	Modern pentathlon (running)	Not listed.	
Arch of Constantine	Athletics (marathon - finish line)	14,400	
Basilica of Maxentius	Wrestling	5,402	
Baths of Caracalla	Gymnastics	5,402	
Campo Tre Fontane	Field hockey	5,000	
Cesano Infantry School Range	Shooting (300 m free rifle)	Not listed.	
Stadio Artemio Franchi (Florence)	Football	57,020	
Stadio Olimpico Carlo Zecchini (Grosseto)	Football	17,970	
Gulf of Naples	Sailing	Not listed.	
Stadio Tommaso Fattori (L'Aquila)	Football	8,900	
Lake Albano	Canoeing, Rowing	8,900	
Lazio Pigeon Shooting Stand	Shooting (shotgun trap)	2,000	
Livorno Ardenza Stadium	Football	25,000	
Stadio San Paolo (Naples)	Football	90,000	
Olympic Velodrome	Cycling (track), Field hockey	17,856	
Palazzo dei Congressi	Fencing, Modern pentathlon (fencing)	Not listed.	
Palazzo dello Sport	Basketball, Boxing	13,839	
Palazzetto dello sport	Basketball, Weightlifting	Not listed.	
Passo Corese	Modern pentathlon (riding)	Not listed.	
Stadio Adriatico (Pescara)	Football	21,000	
Piazza di Siena	Equestrian (dressage, eventing dressage/ jumping, jumping individual)	15,000	
Piscina delle Rose	Water polo	1,850	
Pratoni del Vivaro	Equestrian (eventing)	Not listed.	
Raccordo Anulare	Athletics (marathon)	Not listed.	
Stadio dei Marmi	Field hockey	15,000	
Stadio Flaminio	Football (final)	46,873	
Stadio Olimpico	Opening and closing ceremonies, Athletics	75,513	
Stadio Olimpico del Nuoto	Diving, Modern pentathlon (swimming), Swimming, Water polo	20,000	
Umberto I Shooting Range	Modern pentathlon (shooting), Shooting (pistol, rifle)	Not listed.	
Via Appia Antica	Athletics (marathon)	Not listed.	
Via Cassia	Cycling (individual road race)	Not listed.	
Via Flaminia	Cycling (individual road race)	Not listed.	
Via Cristoforo Colombo	Athletics (marathon), cycling (road team time trial)	19,200	
Via di Grottarossa	Cycling (individual road race)	41,800	

== Before the Olympics ==
Rome was scheduled to host the 1908 Summer Olympics, but had to withdraw due to the eruption of Mount Vesuvius in 1906. The 1908 Games were given to London as a result following a meeting at the 1906 Intercalated Games in Athens.

Rome hosted the ISSF World Shooting Championships (then UIT) five times from 1897 to the start of World War II, doing so in 1902, 1911, 1927, 1930, and 1935.

The biggest event for Italy was hosting the 1934 FIFA World Cup in which the host nation won. Florence's stadium hosted three matches during the World Cup while the finals would be played in Rome, at a stadium located on the current site of the Flaminio Stadium. Stadio Flaminio would be constructed in 1957 following the demolition of Stadio Nazionale PNF in 1953.

The Palazzo dei Congressi was constructed in 1942 for a Universal Exposition in that year that was not held to World War II. Palazzetto Dello Sport was constructed in time for the 1960 Games in 1957.

== During the Olympics ==
Pope John XXIII watched some of the canoeing semifinals at the window of his summer residence overlooking Lake Albano. The marathon event was run along Via Appia Antica (English: The Appian Way) and finished at the Arch of Constantine. With the event being run at night, the course was illuminated by Italian soldiers holding torches.

During the road team time trial event at Via Cristoforo Colombo in 93 °F (34 °C) heat, Danish cyclist Knud Enemark Jensen collapsed from sunstroke, suffered a fractured skull, and later died from it. Autopsy results determined that Jensen had taken Roniacol, a blood circulation stimulant. Before Jensen's collapse, Denmark had been in fourth place at the 66.6 km (41.4 mi) mark of the event.

== After the Olympics ==
Stadio Olimpico del Norto hosted the FINA World Aquatics Championships in 1994.

Palazzo dei Congressi continues as an exhibition center in Rome.

In 1987, Stadio Olimpico hosted the second World Athletics Championships. During the following three years, the stadium was reconstructed to serve as one of the twelve venues used for the FIFA World Cup. The stadium itself hosted the finals for that tournament. The Stadium at Florence which hosted some of the 1934 World Cup matches, hosted four 1990 World Cup matches, including the quarterfinal match between Argentina and Yugoslavia.
