= List of Olympic venues in shooting =

For the Summer Olympics, there are 38 venues that have been or will be used for shooting sports.

Games	Venue	Other sports at venue for those games	Capacity	Ref.
1896 Athens	Kallithea	None	Not listed.	
1900 Paris	Boulogne-Billancourt	None	Not listed.	
1900 Paris	Satory	None	Not listed.	
1908 London	Bisley Ranges (pistol/rifle)	None	Not listed.	
1908 London	Uxendon Shooting School Club (shotgun)	None	Not listed.	
1912 Stockholm	Råsunda Stadium	Football	Not listed.	
1920 Antwerp	Beverloo Camp (pistol/rifle)	None	Not listed.	
1920 Antwerp	Hoogboom Military Camp (running target, trap shooting)	None	Not listed.	
1924 Paris	Camp de Châlons (600 m free rifle individual and team)	None	395	
1924 Paris	Issy-les-Moulineaux (trap shooting, including team event)	None	41	
1924 Paris	Stade Olympique de Reims (running target, trap shooting)	None	420	
1924 Paris	Le Stand de Tir de Versailles (25 m rapid fire pistol, running deer)	Modern pentathlon (shooting)	82	
1932 Los Angeles	Los Angeles Police Pistol Range	Modern pentathlon (shooting)	Not listed.	
1936 Berlin	Wannsee Shooting Range	None	Not listed.	
1948 London	Bisley Ranges	Modern pentathlon (shooting)	Not listed.	
1952 Helsinki	Huopalahti (shotgun)	None	Not listed.	
1952 Helsinki	Malmi shooting range (pistol/rifle)	None	Not listed.	
1956 Melbourne	Royal Australian Air Force, Laverton Air Base (shotgun)	None	Not listed	
1956 Melbourne	Williamstown (pistol/rifle)	Modern pentathlon (shooting)	Not listed.	
1960 Rome	Cesano Infantry School Range (300 m free rifle)	None	Not listed.	
1960 Rome	Lazio Pigeon Shooting Stand (shotgun trap)	None	2,000	
1960 Rome	Umberto I Shooting Range (pistol/rifle)	Modern pentathlon (shooting)	Not listed.	
1964 Tokyo	Asaka Shooting Range (pistol/rifle)	Modern pentathlon (shooting)	1,200	
1964 Tokyo	Tokorozawa Shooting Range (shotgun trap)	None	1,300	
1968 Mexico City	Vicente Suárez Shooting Range	Modern pentathlon (shooting)	Not listed.	
1972 Munich	Schießanlage	Modern pentathlon (shooting)	4,500	
1976 Montreal	Olympic Shooting Range, L'Acadie	Modern pentathlon (shooting)	1,000	
1980 Moscow	Dynamo Shooting Range	Modern pentathlon (shooting)	2,330	
1984 Los Angeles	Prado Regional Park	None	5,000	
1988 Seoul	Taenung International Shooting Range	Modern pentathlon (shooting)	2,505	
1992 Barcelona	Mollet del Vallès Shooting Range	Modern pentathlon (shooting)	1,400	
1996 Atlanta	Wolf Creek Shooting Complex	None	7,500	
2000 Sydney	Sydney International Shooting Centre	None	7,000	
2004 Athens	Markopoulo Olympic Shooting Centre	None	Not listed.	
2008 Beijing	Beijing Shooting Range Clay Target Field (shotgun)	None	5,000	
2008 Beijing	Beijing Shooting Range Hall (pistol/rifle)	None	9,000	
2012 London	Royal Artillery Barracks	Modern pentathlon (shooting)	7,500	
2016 Rio de Janeiro	National Shooting Center	None	6,850	
2020 Tokyo	Camp Asaka	None	7,500	
2024 Paris	National Shooting Centre	None	3,000	
2028 Los Angeles	El Monte Shooting Center; Long Beach Convention Center (target shooting)	None	tbd	
2032 Brisbane	Brisbane International Shooting Centre	None	2,000	

== Gallery of venues ==
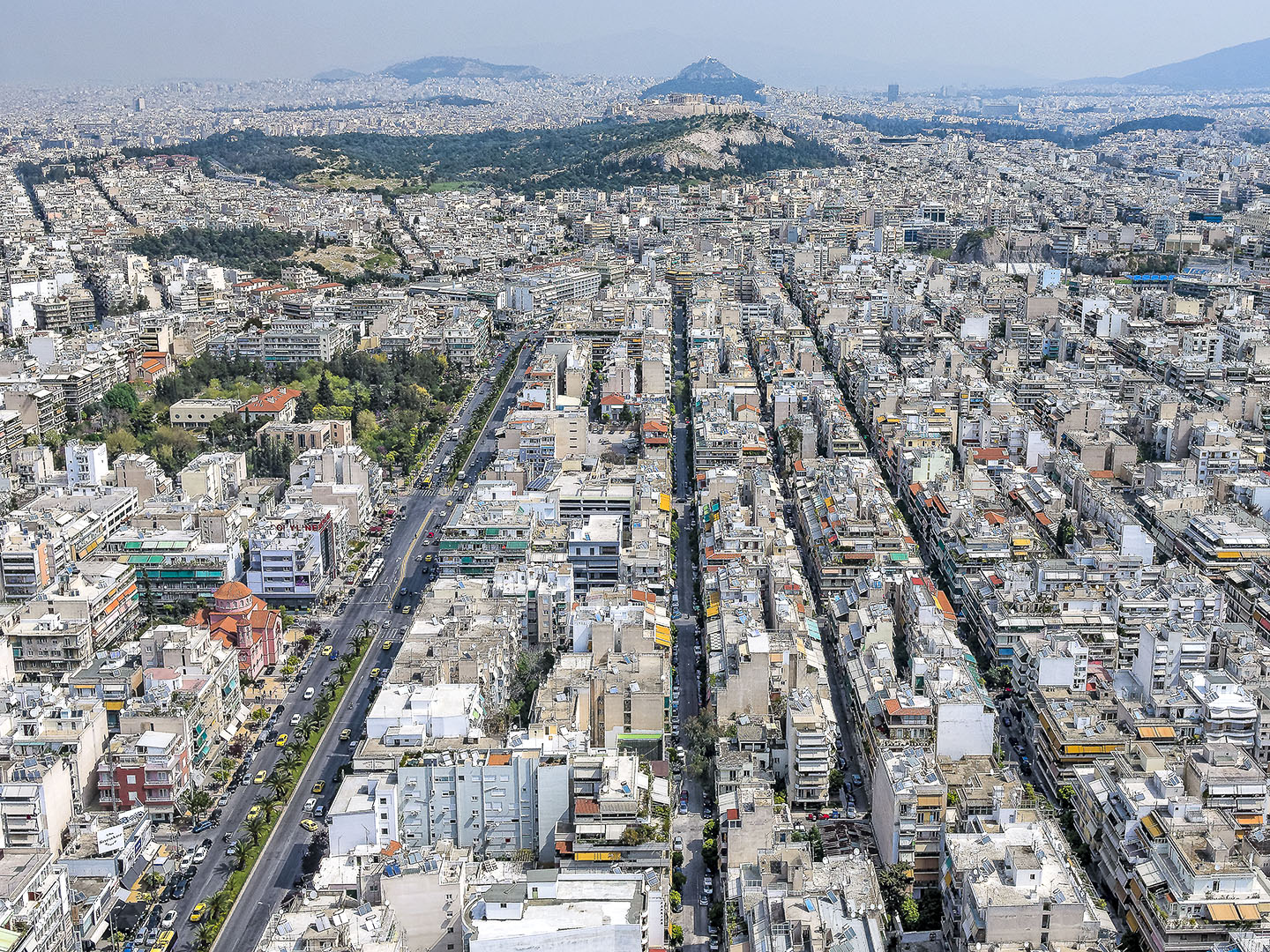
Kallithea hosted shooting at the 1896 Summer Olympics in Athens.

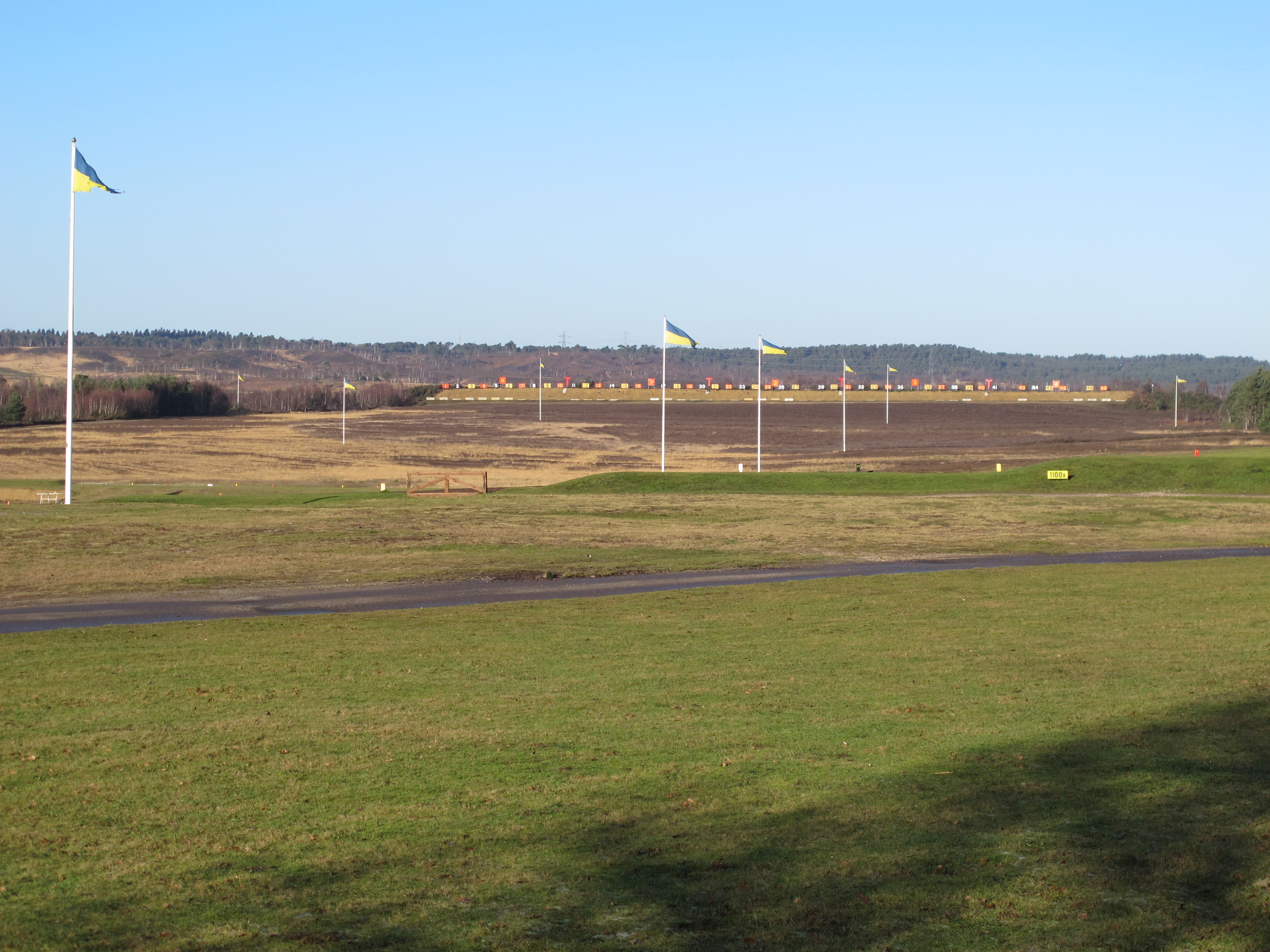
The National Shooting Centre hosted shooting at the 1908 and 1948 Summer Olympics in London.

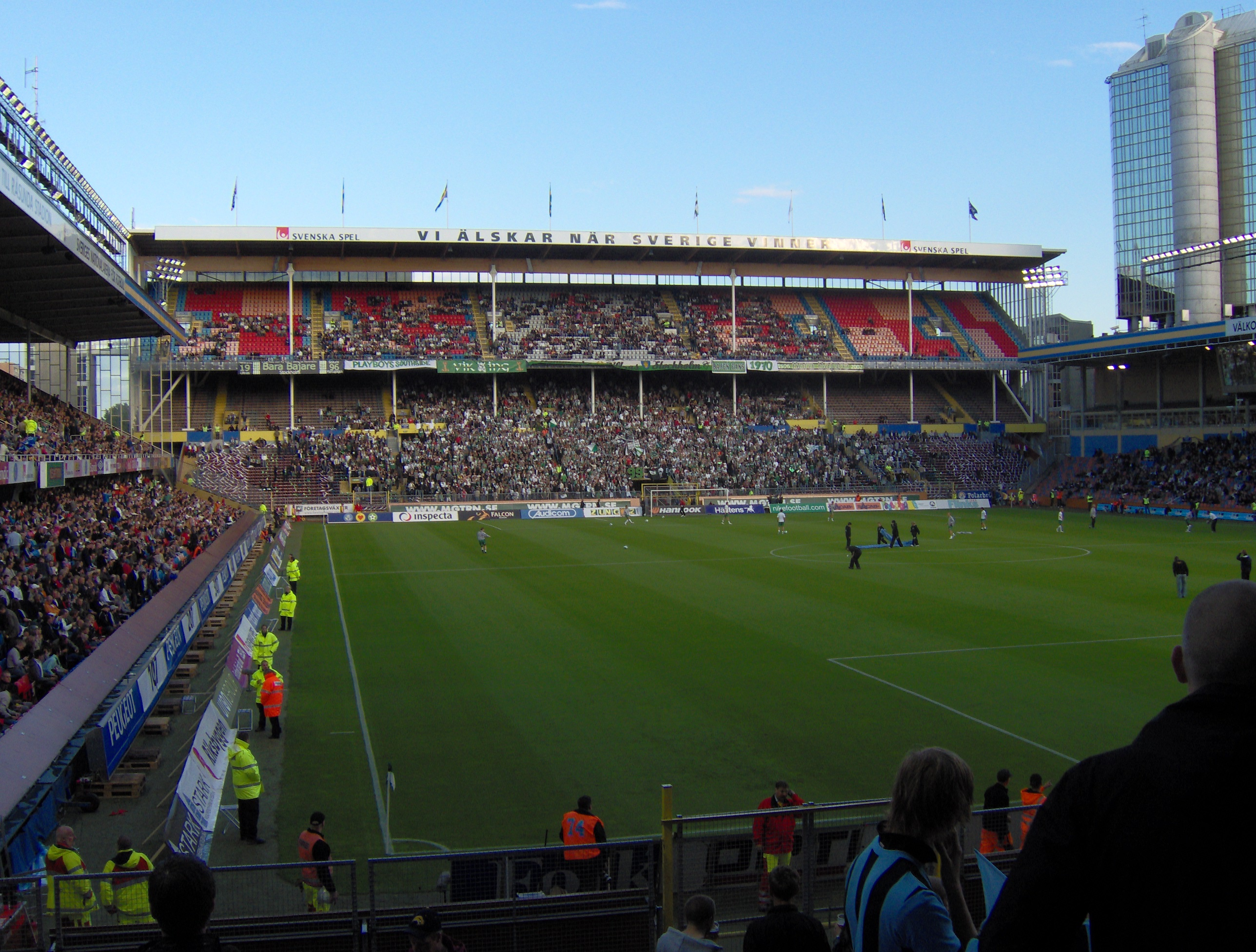
Råsunda Stadium hosted shooting at the 1912 Summer Olympics in Stockholm.

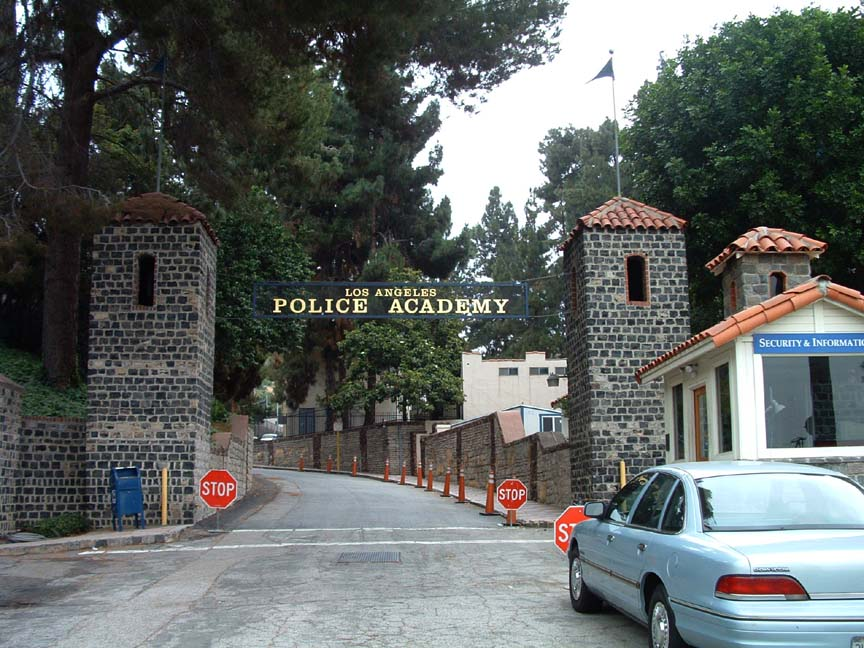
The Los Angeles Police Department Academy shooting range hosted shooting at the 1932 Summer Olympics.

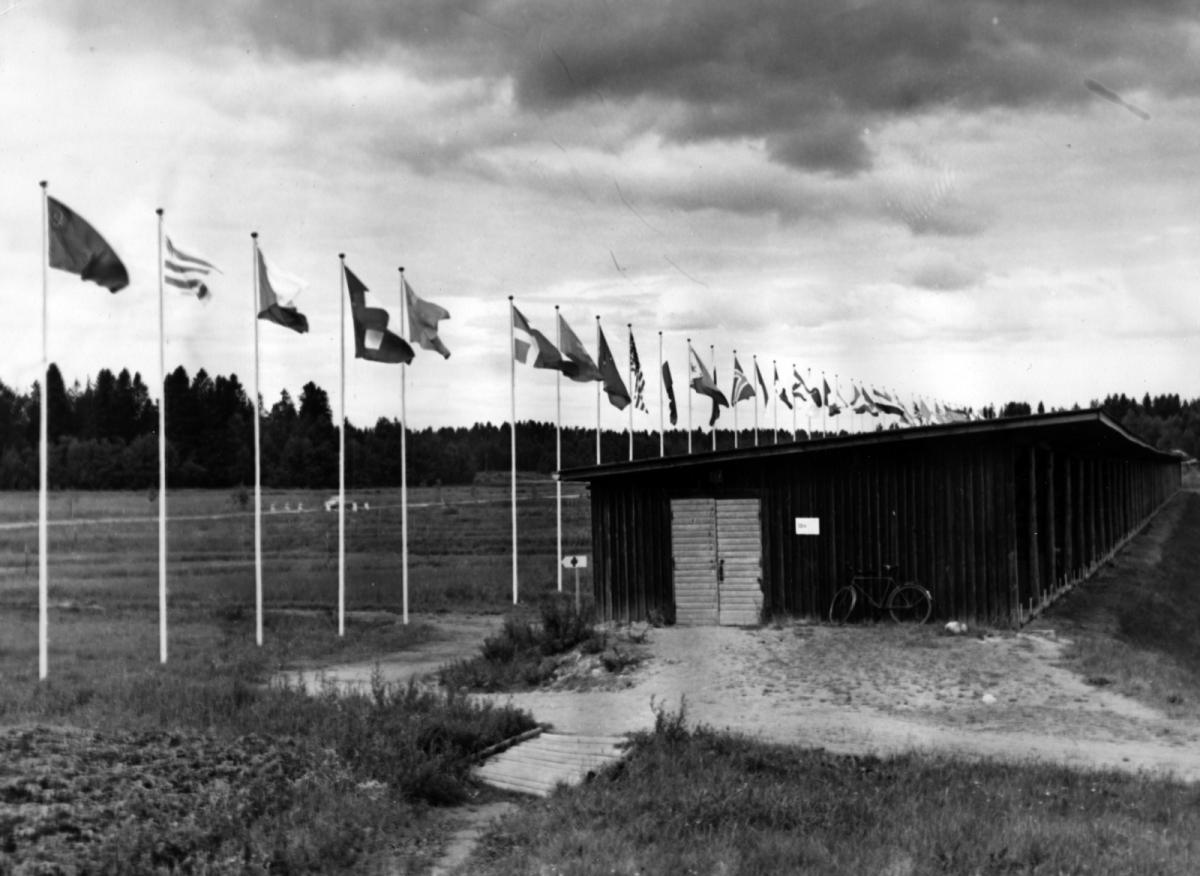
The Malmi shooting range hosted shooting at the 1952 Summer Olympics in Helsinki.

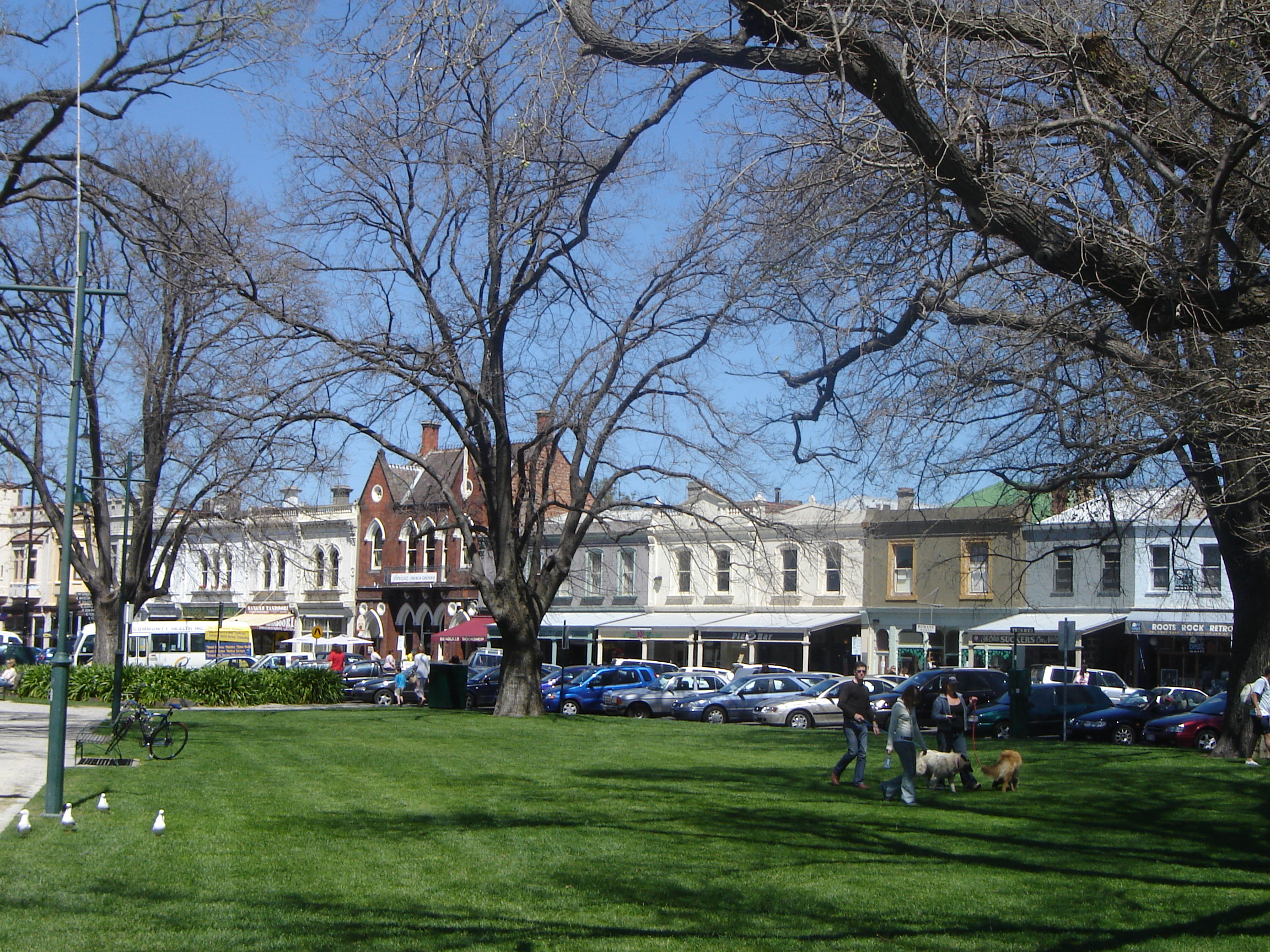
Williamstown hosted the pistol and rifle portion of the shooting competition at the 1956 Summer Olympics in Melbourne.

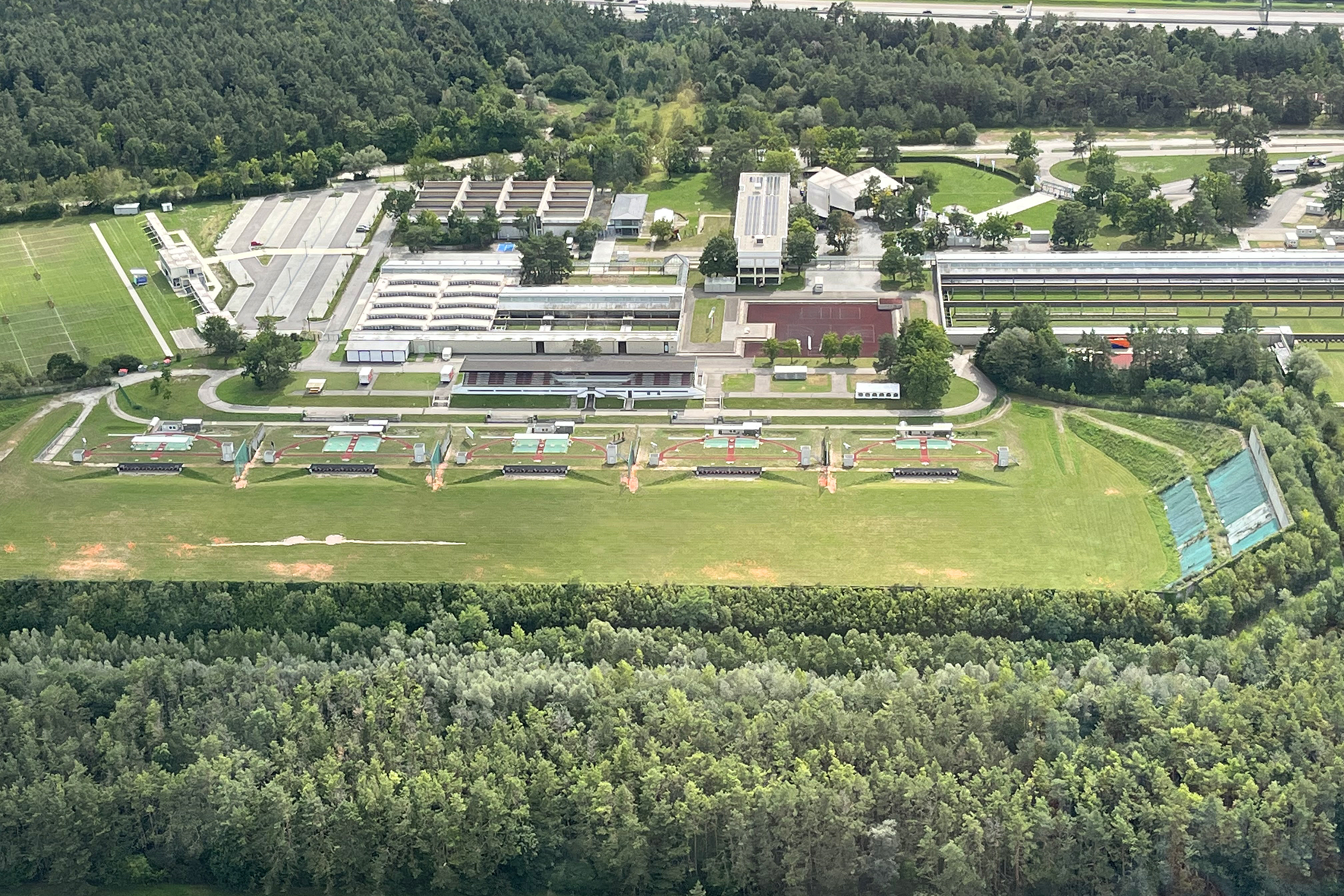
Olympia-Schießanlage hosted shooting at the 1972 Summer Olympics in Munich.

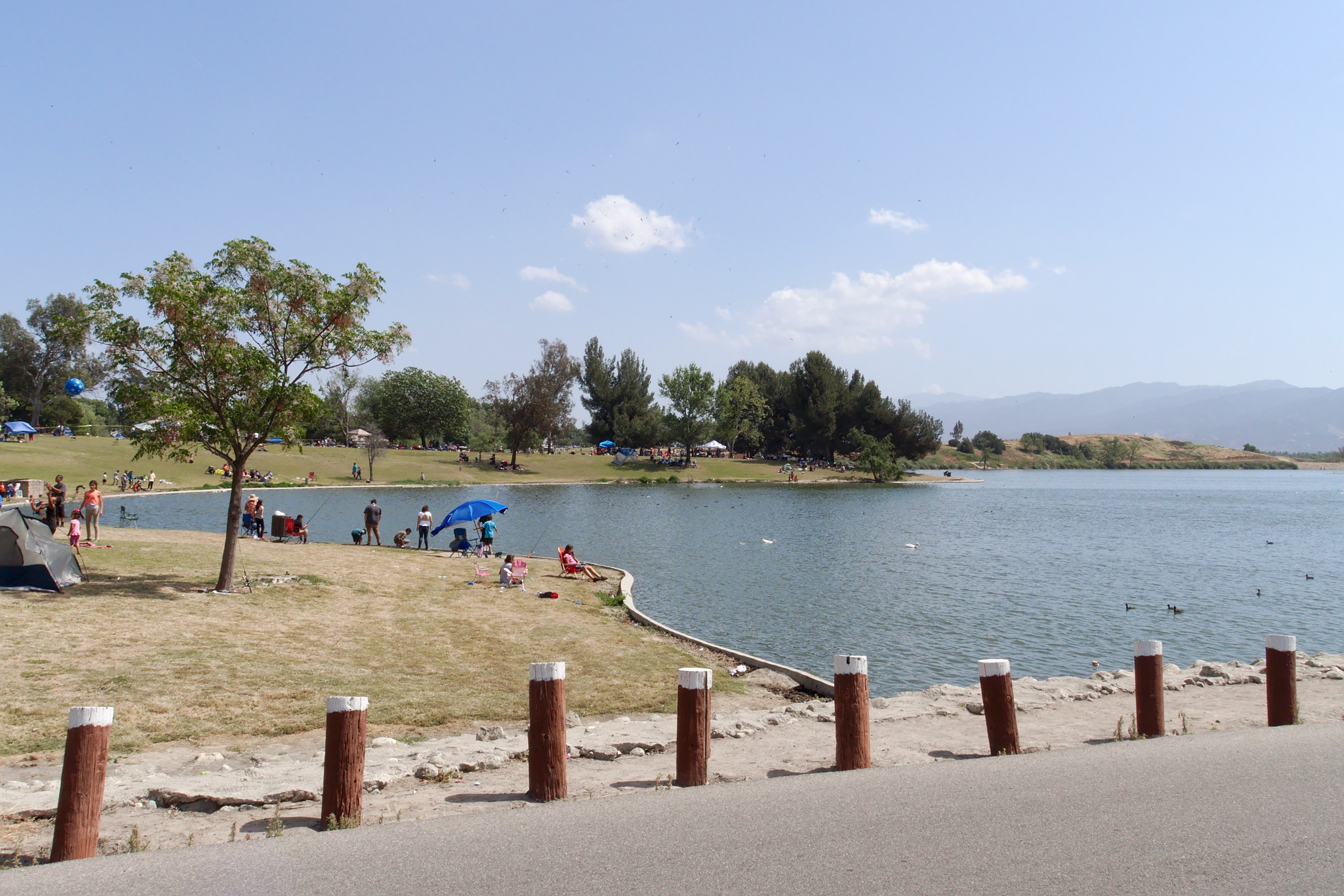
Prado Regional Park hosted shooting at the 1984 Summer Olympics in Los Angeles.

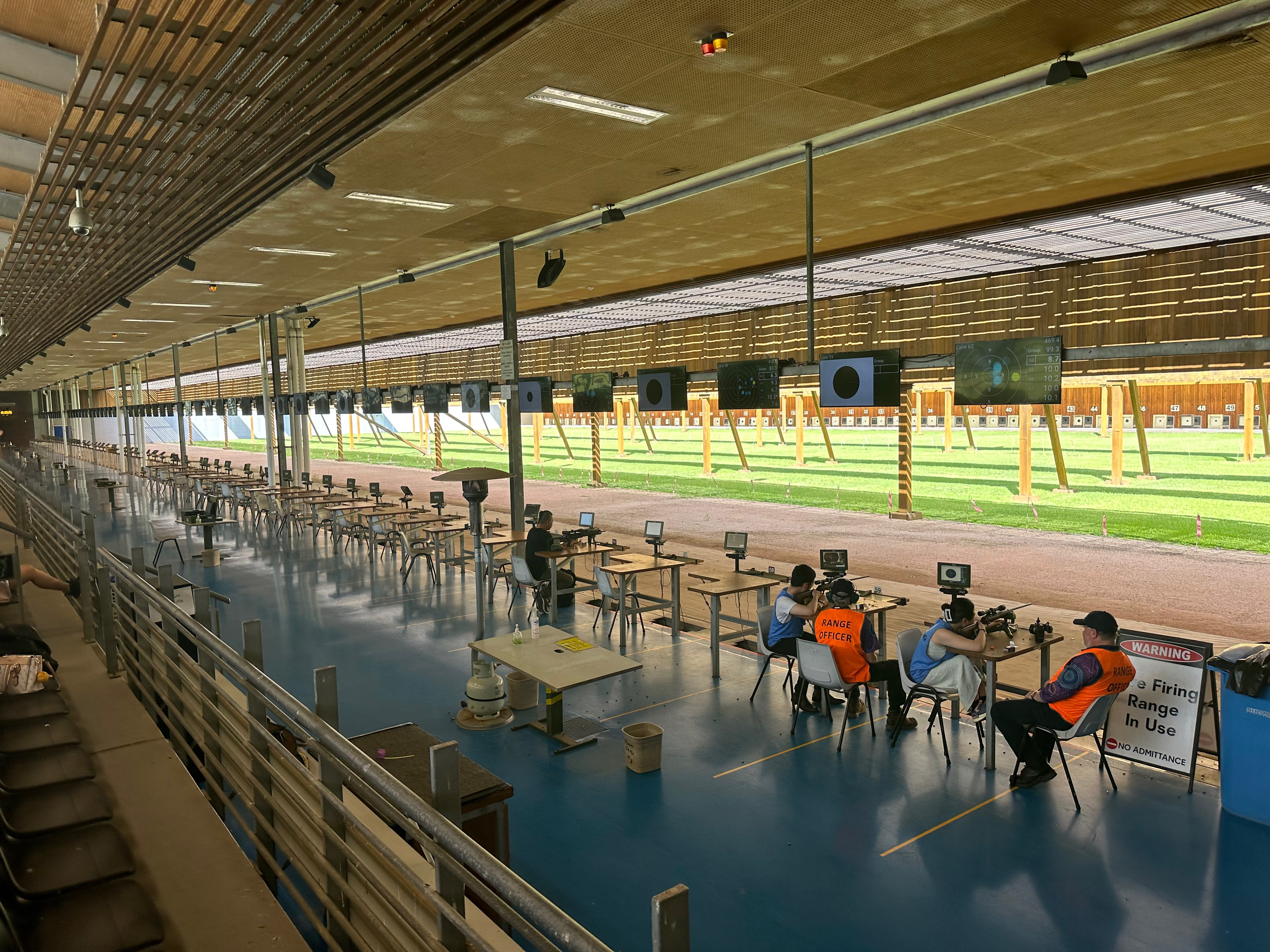
The Sydney International Shooting Centre hosted shooting at the 2000 Summer Olympics.

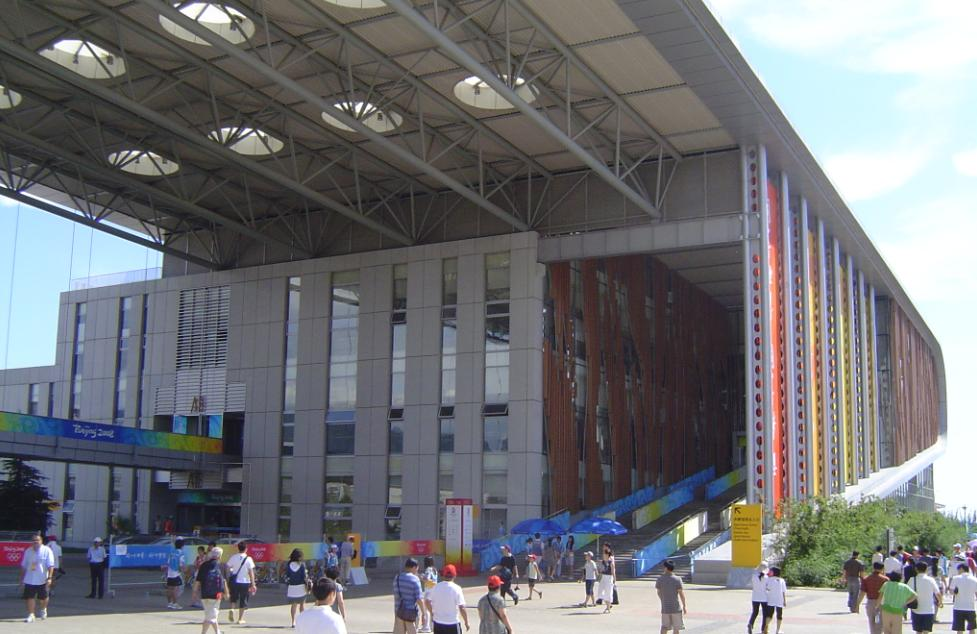
The Beijing Shooting Range Hall hosted the pistol and rifle portion of the shooting events at the 2008 Summer Olympics.

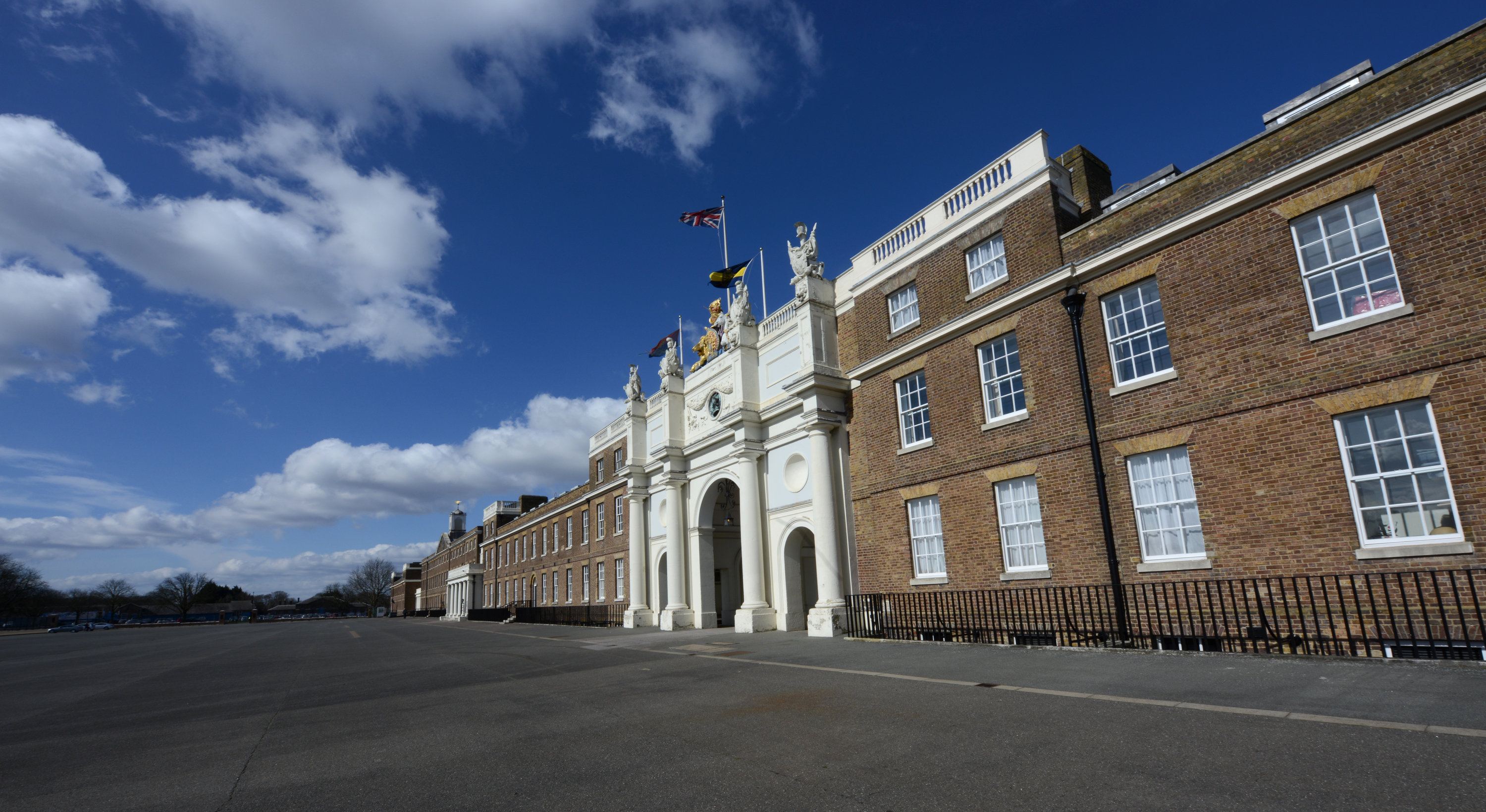
The Royal Artillery Barracks hosted shooting at the 2012 Summer Olympics in London.

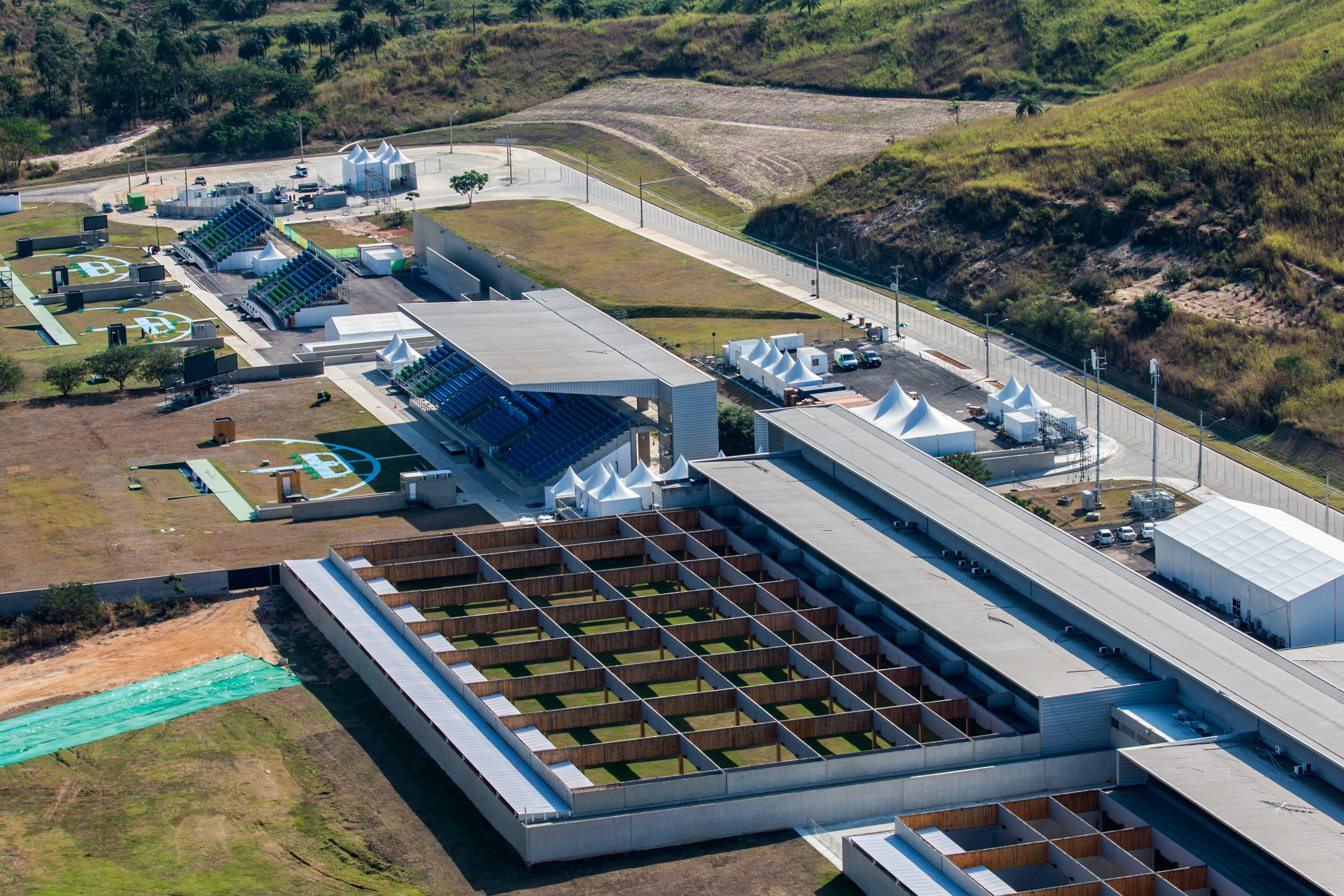
The National Shooting Center hosted shooting at the 2016 Summer Olympics in Rio de Janeiro.

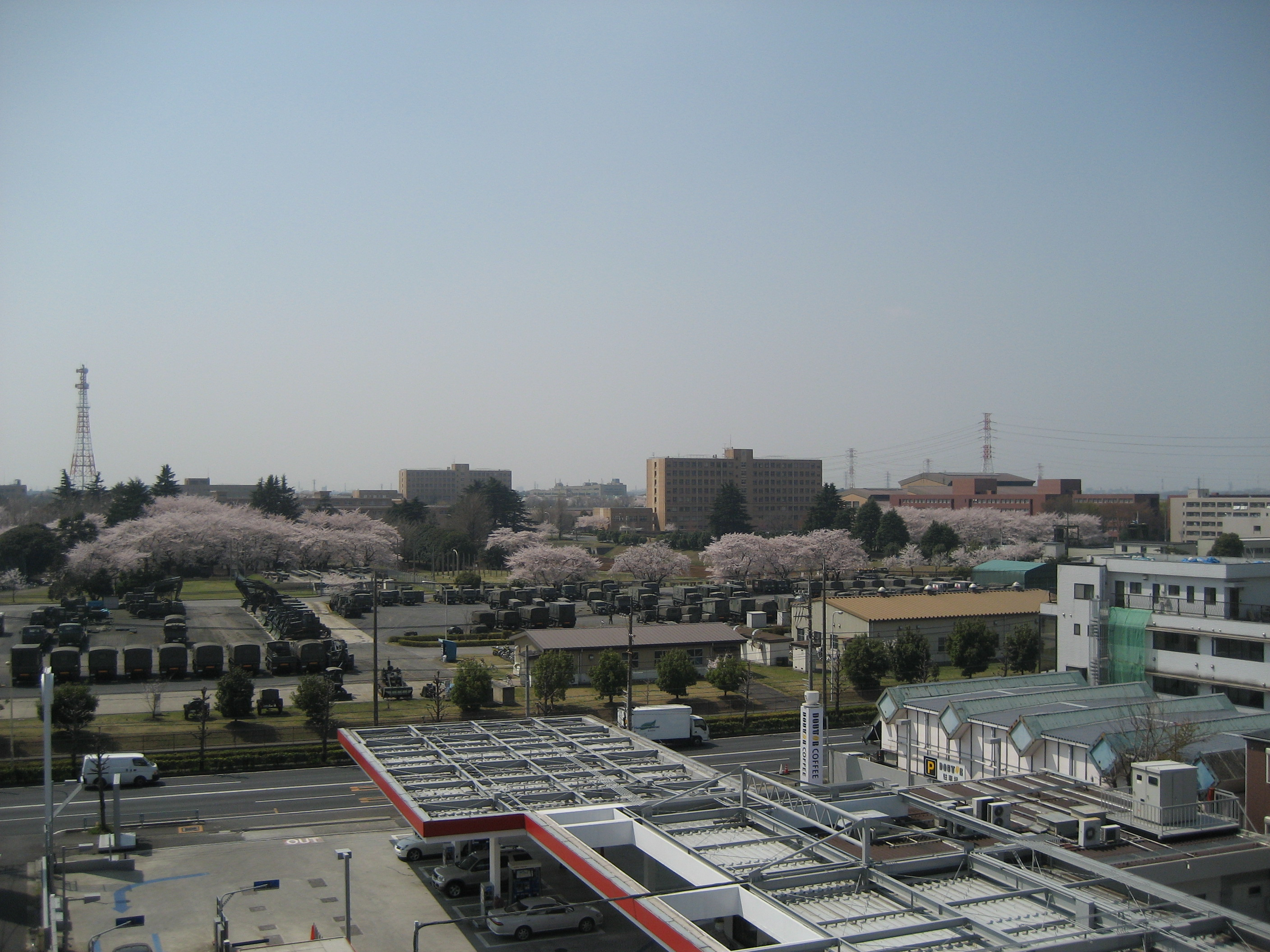
Camp Asaka hosted shooting at the 2020 Summer Olympics in Tokyo.

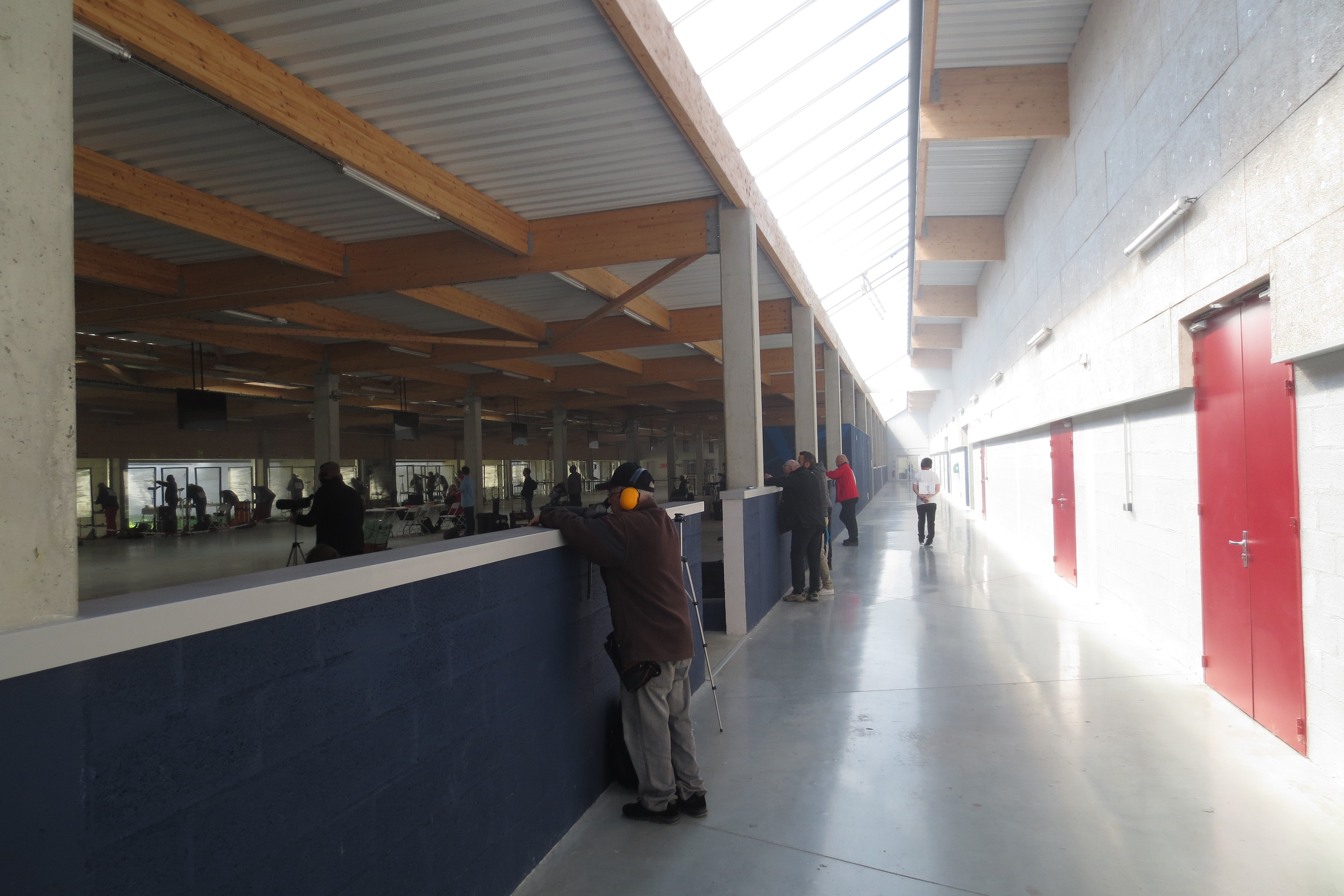
The National Shooting Centre hosted shooting at the 2024 Summer Olympics in Paris.

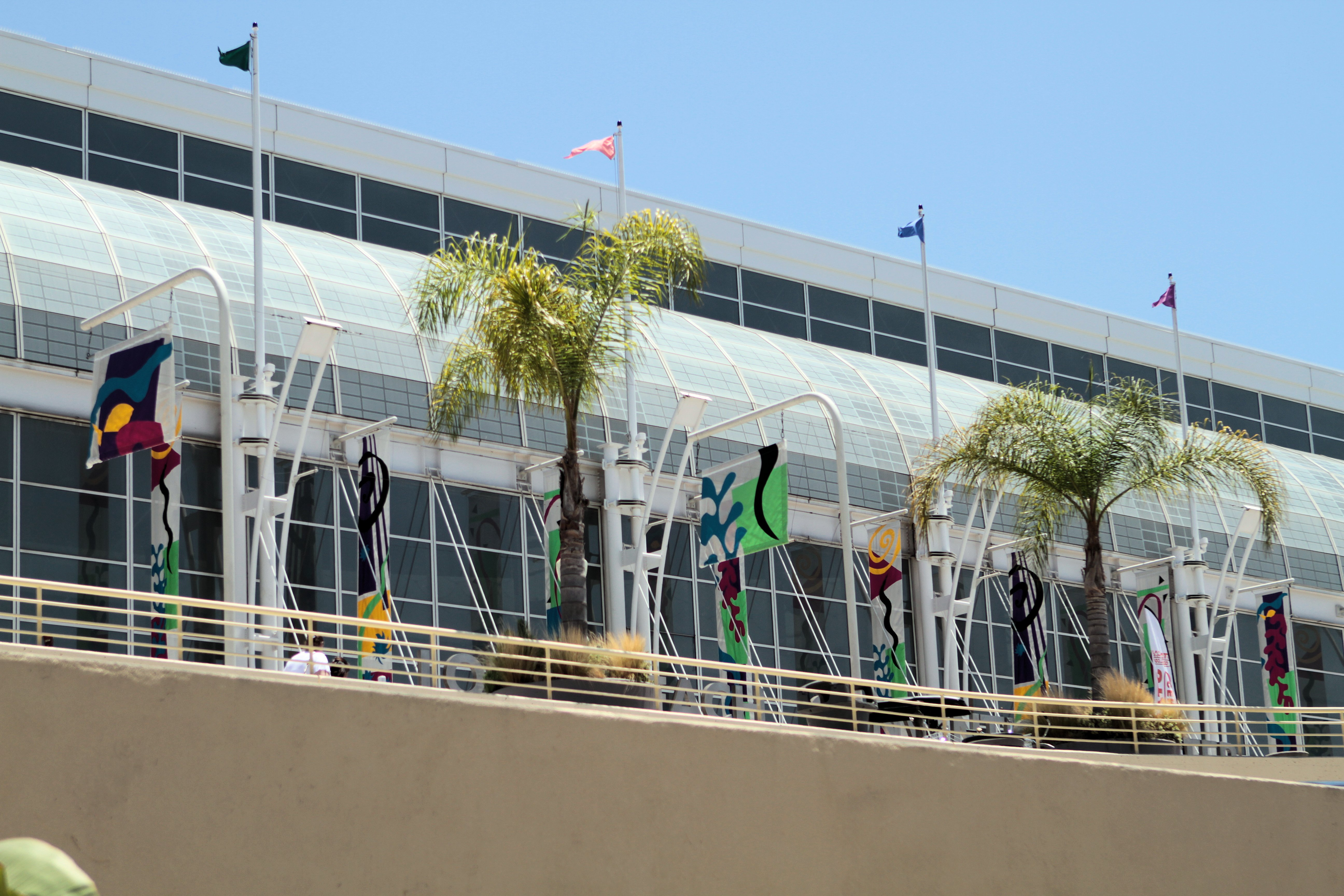
The Long Beach Convention Center will host the target shooting portion of the shooting competition at the 2028 Summer Olympics in Los Angeles.
