= Iakovos =

Iakovos is a transliteration of the Greek name Ἰάκωβος, which in an English form is Jacob or James. Notable people with the name include:

- Archbishop Iakovos of America (1911–2005), Primate of the Greek Orthodox Archdiocese of North and South America
- Iakovos Garmatis (1928–2017), Metropolitan of Chicago under the Ecumenical Patriarchate of Constantinople
- Iakovos Kambanellis (1921–2011), Greek poet and writer
- Iakovos Kolanian (born 1960), Armenian-Greek classical guitarist
- Iakovos Milentigievits (born 1997), Greek basketball player
- Iakovos Nafpliotis (1864–1942), Archon Protopsaltis of the Holy and Great Church of Christ in Constantinople
- Iakovos Psaltis (born 1935), Greek weightlifter
- Iakovos Rizos (1849–1926), Greek painter
- Iakovos Theofilas (1861–unknown), Greek sports shooter
- Iakovos Tombazis (c. 1782–1829), Greek ship-owner and Admiral of the Greek Navy
- Iakovos Trivolis (died 1547), Greek Renaissance humanist and writer
- Iakovos "Jake" Tsakalidis (born 1979), Georgian-born Greek basketball player

== See also ==
- Saint James (disambiguation)
- Agios Iakovos, a village in Cyprus
