= Abdel Kader Ben Kamel =

Moroccan weightlifter

Personal information
- Full name: Abdel Kader Ben Kamel
- Nationality: Moroccan
- Born: 1937 (age 88–89) Marrakesh, Morocco

Sport
- Sport: Weightlifting

Abdel Kader Ben Kamel (Arabic: عبد القادر بن كامل; born 1937) is a Moroccan weightlifter. He competed in the men's light heavyweight event at the 1960 Summer Olympics, becoming one of the athletes to represent Morocco at their first appearance at an Olympic Games.

In the military press, he would place 22nd in the lift. Afterwards was the snatch and clean and jerk, placing 21st and equal 20th in the lifts, respectively. Kamel placed 20th out of all of the competitors that competed in the event.

== Biography ==
Abdel Kader Ben Kamel was born in 1937 in Marrakesh, Morocco.

Kamel would represent Morocco at the 1960 Summer Olympics in Rome, Italy. There, he would be one of the first athletes to compete for the nation at a Summer Games as the nation would make its debut at these Summer Games. At the 1960 Summer Games, he competed in the men's light-heavyweight category for lifters that weighed 82.5 kilograms or less. The competition would be held on 9 September 1960; Kamel competed against 23 other athletes that participated in the event.

The first lift of the event would be the military press. There, he lifted 105 kilograms and placed 22nd in the lift. The next lift would be the snatch, where he would lift 102.5 kilograms and place 21st in the lift. The last lift of the event would be the clean and jerk, where he would place equal 20th alongside Jesús Rodríguez of Spain with a lift of 130 kilograms. With a total amount of 337.5 kilograms of weight lifted added together, Kamel would place 20th out of the 21 athletes that completed the event.
