= Weightlifting at the 1960 Summer Olympics – Men's 82.5 kg =

Weightlifting at the Olympics

Men's 82.5 kg at the Games of the XVII Olympiad
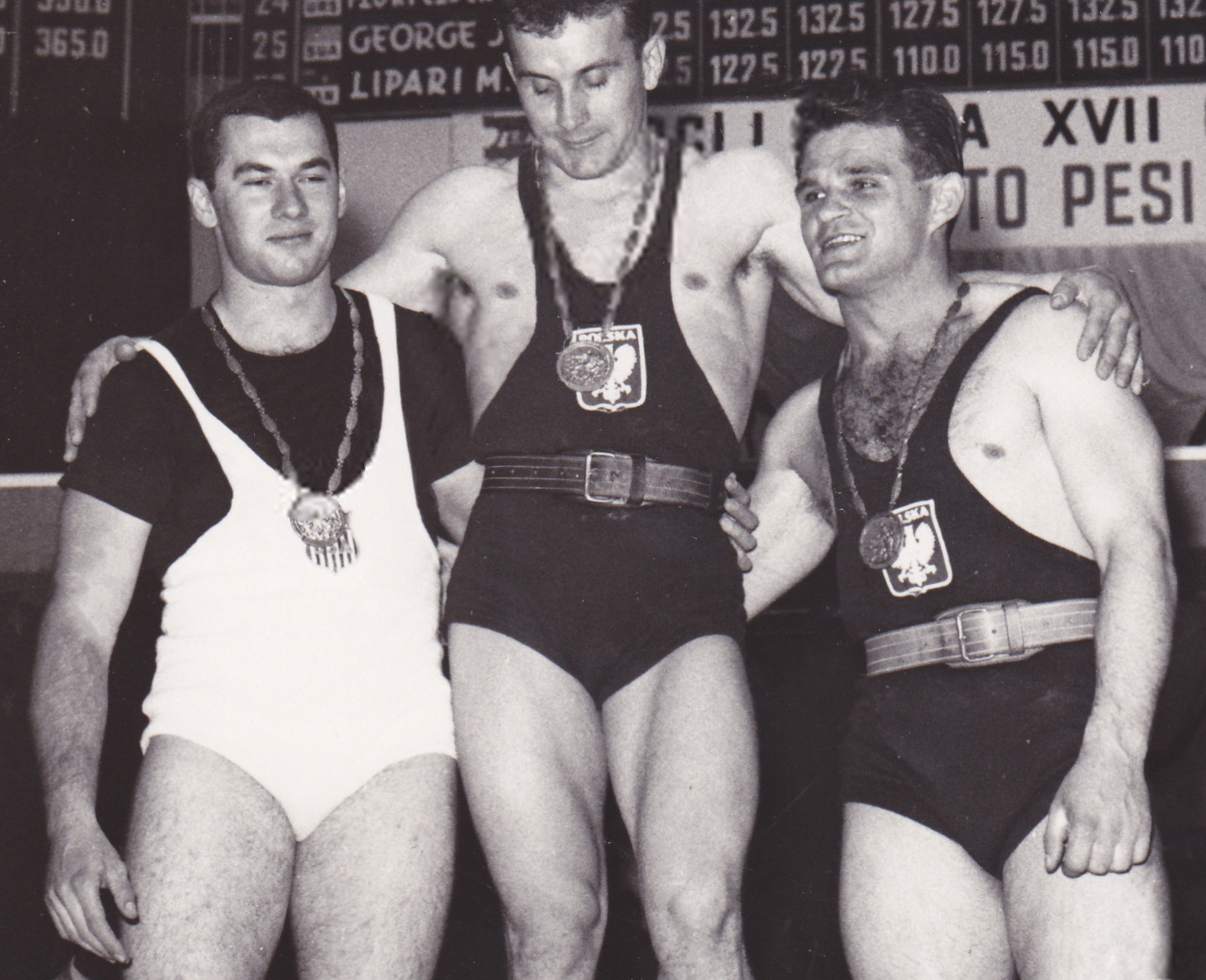
- Medal winners
- Venue: Palazzetto dello Sport
- Date: 9 September 1960
- Competitors: 24 from 22 nations
- Winning total: 442.5 kg

Medalists
1st place, gold medalist(s)		Ireneusz Paliński	Poland
2nd place, silver medalist(s)		Jim George	United States
3rd place, bronze medalist(s)		Jan Bochenek	Poland

The men's 82.5 kg weightlifting competitions at the 1960 Summer Olympics in Rome took place on 9 September at the Palazzetto dello Sport. It was the ninth appearance of the light heavyweight class.

== Results ==
Rank	Name	Country	kg
1	Ireneusz Paliński	Poland	442.5
2	Jim George	United States	430.0
3	Jan Bochenek	Poland	420.0
4	Géza Tóth	Hungary	417.5
5	Jouni Kailajärvi	Finland	417.5
6	Petar Tachev	Bulgaria	415.0
7	Minoru Kubota	Japan	400.0
8	Willy Claes	Belgium	392.5
9	Shakir Salman	Iraq	390.0
10	Amiri Mangashti	Iran	390.0
11	Fernando Torres	Puerto Rico	390.0
12	Jean Debuf	France	390.0
13	Rolf Sennewald	United Team of Germany	390.0
14	Mike Lipari	Canada	387.5
15	Phil Caira	Great Britain	385.0
16	Sven Borrman	Sweden	385.0
17	Iakovos Psaltis	Greece	385.0
18	Kuan King Lam	Malaya	370.0
19	Roland Fidel	Switzerland	365.0
20	Abdel Kader Ben Kamel	Morocco	337.5
21	Jesús Rodríguez	Spain	325.0
AC	Mohamed Ali Abdel Kerim	United Arab Republic	115.0
AC	Sylvanus Blackman	Great Britain	250.0
AC	Enrique Guittens	Venezuela	DNF
