= Sven Borrman =

Swedish weightlifter

Personal information
- Nationality: Swedish
- Born: 22 August 1933; Riguldi, Estonia
- Died: 29 May 2004 (aged 70–71); Haninge, Sweden

Sport
- Sport: Weightlifting

Sven Borrman (22 August 1933 – 29 May 2004) was a Swedish weightlifter. He competed in the men's light heavyweight event at the 1960 Summer Olympics.
