= Jan Bochenek =

Polish weightlifter (1931–2011)

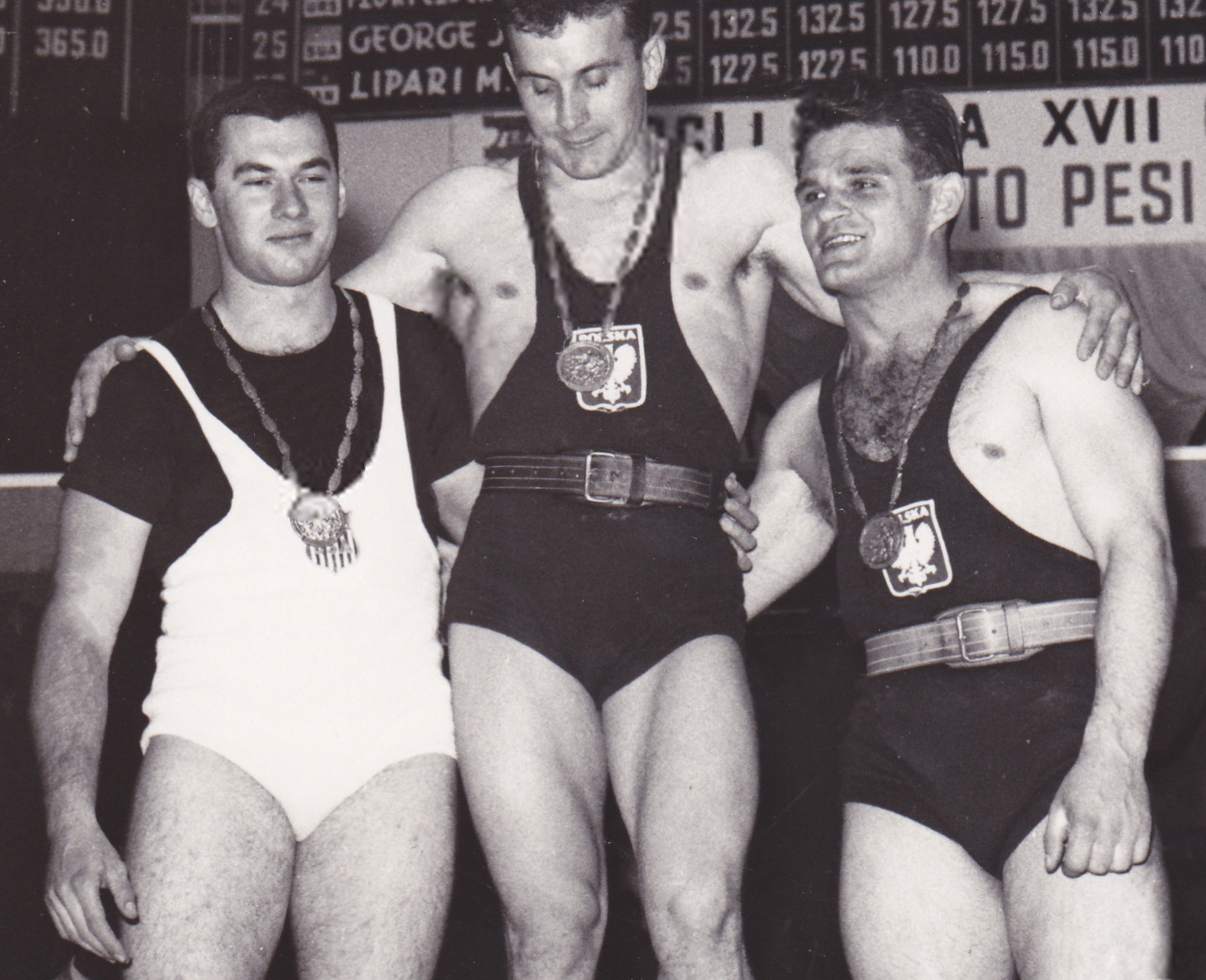
- Jim George, Ireneusz Paliński and Jan Bochenek at the 1960 Olympics

Personal information
- Born: 20 September 1931 Wołczkowo near Stanisławów, Poland
- Died: 2 November 2011 (aged 80) Łódź, Poland
- Height: 1.76 m (5 ft 9 in)
- Weight: 74–82 kg (163–181 lb)

Sport
- Sport: Weightlifting
- Club: Garnizonowego KS Łódź; Legia Warszawa
Medal record
Men's weightlifting
Representing Poland
Olympic Games
Bronze medal – third place	1960 Rome	-82.5 kg
World Championships
Bronze medal – third place	1957 Tehran	-75 kg
Bronze medal – third place	1959 Warsaw	-75 kg

Jan Bochenek (20 September 1931 – 2 November 2011) was a Polish weightlifter. He competed at the 1956 and 1960 Olympics and finished in fourth and third place, respectively. He also won two bronze medals at the world championships of 1957 and 1959.
