= Enrique Guittens =

Venezuelan weightlifter (born 1931)

Personal information
- Full name: Enrique Guittens Stephens
- Nationality: Venezuelan
- Born: 4 December 1931 (age 93); Port of Spain, Trinidad and Tobago

Sport
- Sport: Weightlifting

Enrique Guittens (born 4 December 1931) is a Venezuelan weightlifter. He competed in the men's light heavyweight event at the 1960 Summer Olympics.
