= Shakir Salman =

Iraqi weightlifter

Personal information
- Nationality: Iraqi
- Born: 1936 (age 88–89); Baghdad, Iraq

Sport
- Sport: Weightlifting

Shakir Salman (born 1936) is an Iraqi weightlifter. He competed in the men's light heavyweight event at the 1960 Summer Olympics.
