= Roland Fidel =

Swiss weightlifter

Personal information
- Nationality: Swiss
- Born: 8 February 1935 Le Locle, Switzerland
- Died: 17 March 2017 (aged 82)

Sport
- Sport: Weightlifting

Roland Fidel (8 February 1935 – 17 March 2017) was a Swiss weightlifter. He competed in the men's light heavyweight event at the 1960 Summer Olympics.
