= Malaya at the 1960 Summer Olympics =

- Flag of Malaya
- IOC code: MAL
- NOC: Olympic Council of Malaya

in Rome
- Competitors: 9 in 4 sports
- Flag bearer: Shahrudin Mohamed Ali
- Medals: Gold 0 Silver 0 Bronze 0 Total 0

Summer Olympics appearances (overview)
- 1956; 1960; 1964; 1968; 1972; 1976; 1980; 1984; 1988; 1992; 1996; 2000; 2004; 2008; 2012; 2016; 2020; 2024

The Federation of Malaya competed at the 1960 Summer Olympics in Rome, Italy. Nine competitors, all men, took part in eleven events in four sports. It was the second Olympic appearance by the nation, which expanded and was renamed as Malaysia in 1963.

== Athletics ==
Key

- Note–Ranks given for track events are within the athlete's heat only
- Q = Qualified for the next round
- q = Qualified for the next round as a fastest loser or, in field events, by position without achieving the qualifying target
- NR = National record
- N/A = Round not applicable for the event
- Bye = Athlete not required to compete in round

Men
Track events

Athlete	Event	Heat		Quarterfinal		Semifinal		Final	
Athlete	Event	Time	Rank	Time	Rank	Time	Rank	Time	Rank
Shahrudin Mohamed Ali	100 m	11.11	6	Did not advance					
Shahrudin Mohamed Ali	200 m	22.40	4	Did not advance					
Mani Jegathesan	400 m	48.56	4	Did not advance					

Field event

Athlete	Event	Qualification		Final	
Athlete	Event	Distance	Position	Distance	Position
Kaimaruddin Maidin	Long jump	6.74	43	Did not advance	

== Shooting ==
Men

Athlete	Event	Qualification		Final	
Athlete	Event	Points	Rank	Points	Rank
Chan Kooi Chye	50 m rifle prone	370	76	did not advance	
Ong Hock Eng	Trap	–	–	did not advance	

== Swimming ==
Men

Athlete	Event	Heat		Semifinal		Final	
Athlete	Event	Time	Rank	Time	Rank	Time	Rank
Fong Seow Jit	100 m freestyle	1:03.4	48	Did not advance			
Fong Seow Jit	400 m freestyle	5:07.3	38	—N/a		Did not advance	
Fong Seow Hor	200 m butterfly	2:56.4	33	Did not advance			

== Weightlifting ==
Men

Athlete	Event	Military press		Snatch		Clean & jerk		Total	Rank
Athlete	Event	Result	Rank	Result	Rank	Result	Rank	Total	Rank
Chung Kum Weng	Featherweight	92.5	13	97.5	10	125.0	12	315.0	11
Kuan King Lam	Light heavyweight	112.5	21	115.0	15	142.5	19	370.0	18
