= Iakovos Psaltis =

Greek weightlifter (born 1935)

Personal information
- Nationality: Greek
- Born: 1935 (age 89–90); Alexandria, Egypt

Sport
- Sport: Weightlifting

Iakovos Psaltis (born 1935) is a Greek weightlifter. He competed in the men's light heavyweight event at the 1960 Summer Olympics.
