= Kuan King Lam =

Malaysian weightlifter

Personal information
- Nationality: Malaysian
- Born: 22 November 1934 (age 90); Ipoh, Malaysia

Sport
- Sport: Weightlifting

Kuan King Lam (born 22 November 1934) is a Malaysian former weightlifter. He competed in the men's light heavyweight event at the 1960 Summer Olympics.
