= Jesús Rodríguez (weightlifter) =

Spanish weightlifter (1933–2018)

Personal information
- Nationality: Spanish
- Born: 15 November 1933; Bilbao, Spain
- Died: 13 April 2018 (aged 84); Lezama, Spain

Sport
- Sport: Weightlifting

Jesús Rodríguez Lafuente (15 November 1933 – 13 April 2018) was a Spanish weightlifter. He competed in the men's light heavyweight event at the 1960 Summer Olympics. Rodríguez died in Lezama on 13 April 2018, at the age of 84.
