= Fong Seow Jit =

Malaysian swimmer (born 1942)

Personal information
- Born: 10 July 1942 (age 84) Penang, Japanese-occupied British Malaya

Sport
- Sport: Swimming

Fong Seow Jit (born 10 July 1942) is a Malaysian former swimmer. He competed in two events at the 1960 Summer Olympics.
