= Piscina delle Rose =

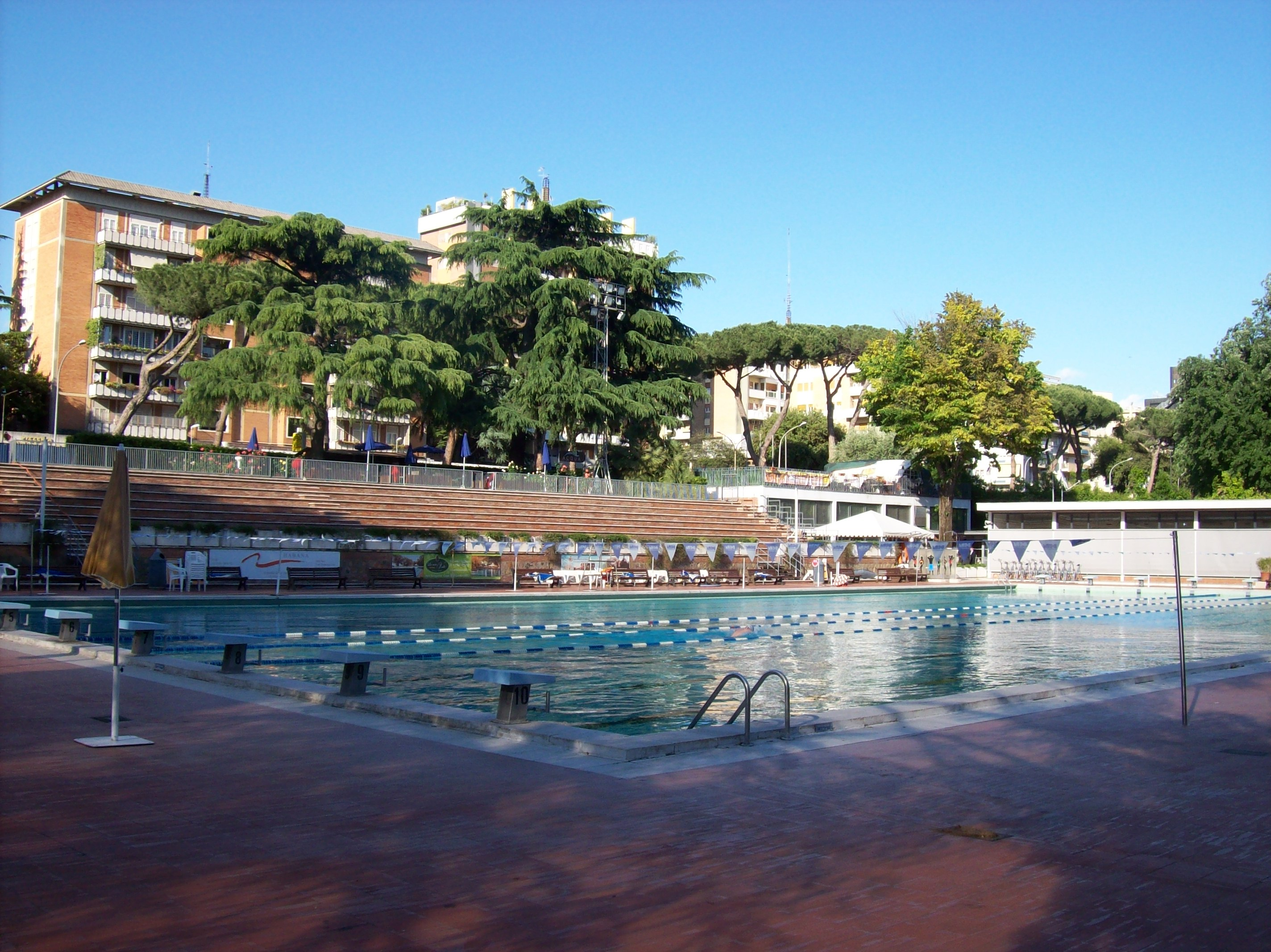
- The Roses' Swimming Pool in 2011
- Click on the map for a fullscreen view

General information
- Location: Rome
- Coordinates: 41°49′51″N 12°27′45″E

The Piscina delle Rose (English: Roses Swimming Pool) is a sports venue located in Rome, Italy. It hosted the preliminaries for the water polo events at the 1960 Summer Olympics.
