= Iakovos Kolanian =

Armenian-Greek classical guitarist (born 1960)

Iakovos Kolanian Յակովոս Քոլանյան Ιάκωβος Κολανιάν
- Born: 1960 (age 65–66); Piraeus, Greece
- Occupation: guitarist

Iakovos Kolanian (Greek: Ιάκωβος Κολανιάν; Eastern Armenian: Յակովոս Քոլանյան) is an Armenian-Greek classical guitarist born in Piraeus, Greece and is best known for his performances and transcriptions of ethnic folk music for the classical guitar.

== Biography ==
Kolanian was born in 1960, to an Armenian father and a Greek mother . He studied at the National Conservatory of Athens with Evangelos Assimakopoulos and Lisa Zoe, and graduated in 1985 with the top award and a special honor for exceptional performance. Since that time, he has attended various special seminars and master classes from distinguished teachers such as Oscar Ghiglia and Leo Brouwer.

=== Performing career ===
Throughout the years he has toured in Europe, Asia, North America, and Latin America, where he has presented to audiences a large part of the classical guitar repertoire. He also regularly takes part in international festivals in Vienna, Milan, Athens, Israel, Cyprus and Yerevan by giving individual recitals or acting as soloist with symphonic orchestras and ensembles of chamber music. He has performed as a soloist with Athens State Orchestra, Thessalonica State Orchestra, Symphonic Orchestra of Greek Broadcasting Corporation (ERT), The Camerata Orchestra of Athens, Armenian Philharmonic Orchestra, etc.

He has also been regularly featured in well-known television and radio programs such as BBC, ORF, Radio France, ERT and RIK.

=== Teaching posts ===
Kolanian has been the head of the Classical Guitar Department at the Contemporary Athens Conservatory since 1992, and is an honorary professor at the Armenian Academy in Yerevan. He currently holds a teaching position at the Athenaeum Conservatory in the classical guitar department.

== Recorded works ==
- Bohemio: Guitar Masterworks of Agustin Barrios (Pomegranate Music, 2006)
- Shoror: Armenian Folk Music for Guitar (Pomegranate Music, 2004)
- Bach Lute Suites for Guitar (Eros, 2003)
- Tjeknavorian's Concerto for Guitar and Orchestra with the Armenian Philharmonic (1991)
