= Via di Grottarossa =

Road in Italy

Via di Grottarossa is an Italian road located north of Rome, Italy. It runs from the Via Cassia to the Via Flaminia. The road was part of the individual road race cycling event for the 1960 Summer Olympics.
