= Iakovos Rizos =

Greek painter

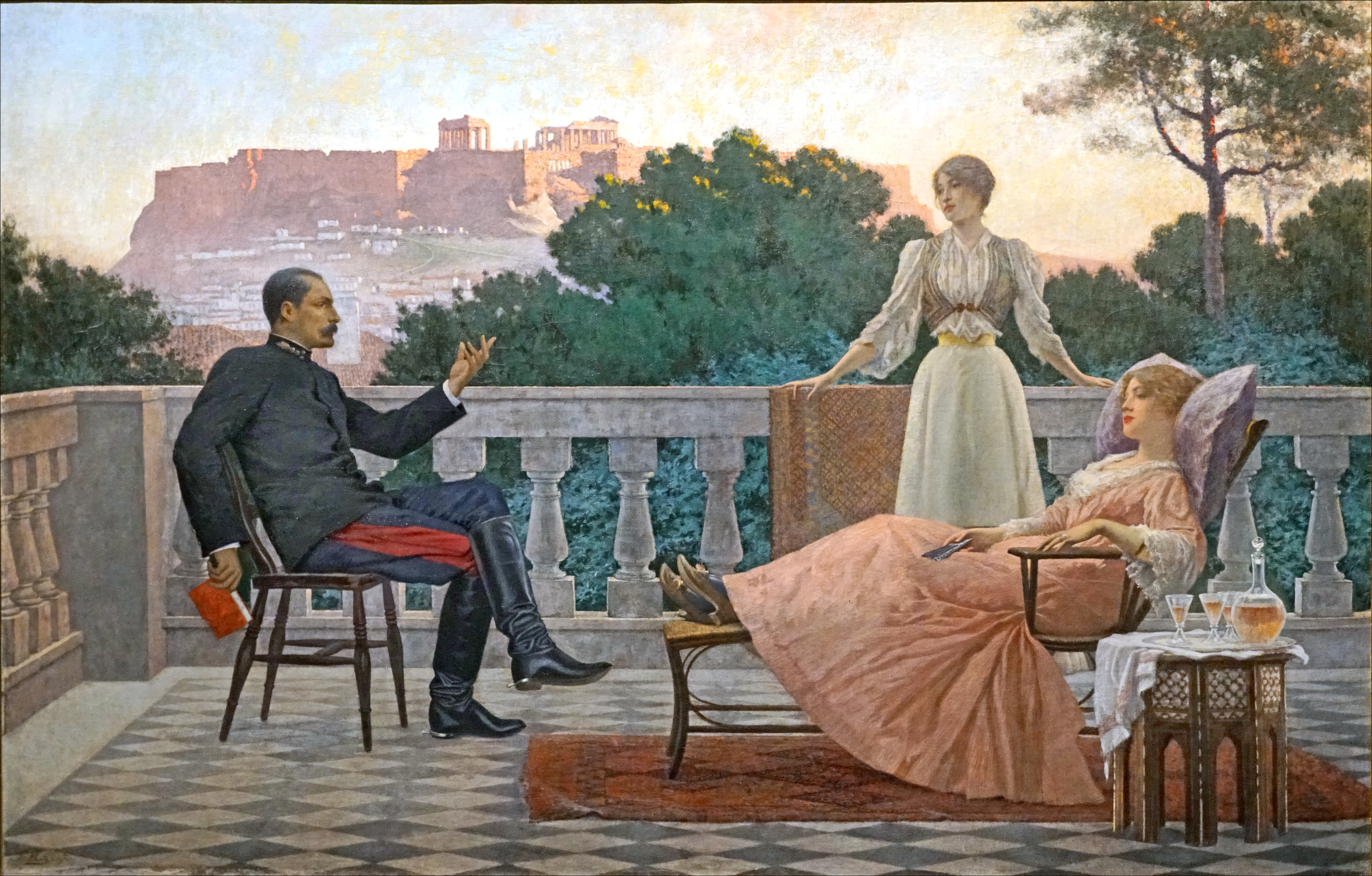
Athenian Evening or On the Terrace, 1897

Iakovos Rizos or Iacovos Rizos (Greek: Ιάκωβος Ρίζος Greek pronunciation: [iˈa.ko.vos ˈɾi.zos]), also known as Jacques Rizo, (c. 1849 – 1926) was a Greek painter who worked primarily in Paris.

== Biography ==
Rizos was born in Athens; he was the grandson of Iakovos Rizos Neroulos and his brother was a civil engineer. He went to Paris as a young man, studied with Alexandre Cabanel at the École des Beaux Arts, and spent his career there. He died there in 1926.

Rizos was a friend of Renoir and associated with the Impressionists, and much admired Degas' work after he first moved to Paris, but his own style was academic. Many of his paintings portray elegantly dressed women; he less often painted landscapes, in an Impressionist-influenced style. He exhibited a number of times at the Paris Salons, beginning with a portrait of his sister, Mrs. Paparrigopoulos, which he re-worked for the 1878 Paris exposition. In 1875 his portrait of "Miss R." in a black silk dress with violet sleeves was noted by one critic as one of the finest portraits in the show. In 1877 his Indolence, a nude, was praised by one critic except for the execution of the head, and by another praised for the colouration but faulted for the drawing, particularly of the hands and feet.

Rizos' Athenian Evening or On the Terrace of 1897 won a silver medal at the 1900 Paris exposition and was praised at the 1899 art exhibition in Athens. It depicts an officer talking to two women on a terrace at sunset, with the Acropolis in the background, in contrast to the more common depictions of Greece in 19th-century painting that focus on rural life. It is a noted example of the juxtaposition of sophisticated urban life with the country's past grandeur, which was a theme of Greek artists in the late 19th and 20th centuries. It and a number of his other paintings are in the Coutlides Collection at the National Gallery of Greece; there are also several in private collections in both Athens and Paris.

At the 1897 salon, Albert-Gustave Belleroche exhibited a portrait of Rizo.

== Gallery ==
Paintings by Iakovos Rizos

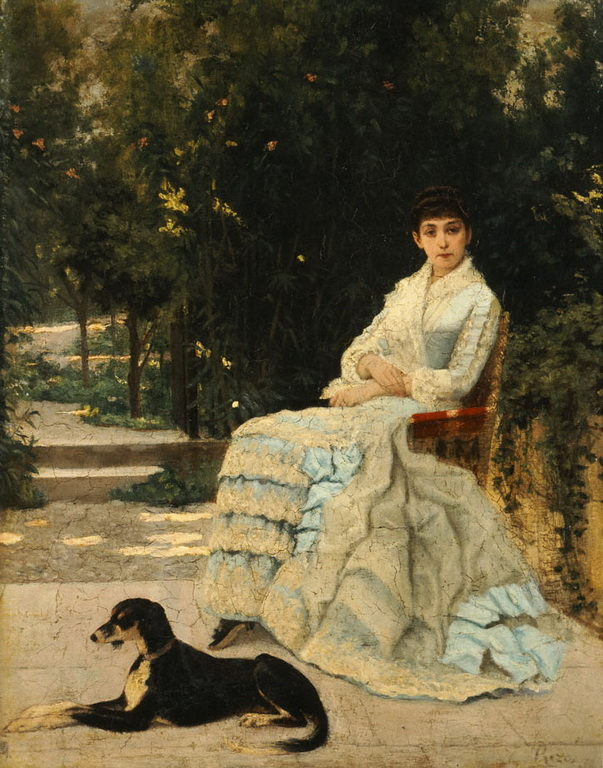
Lady in the Garden with her Dog (1885–1890)

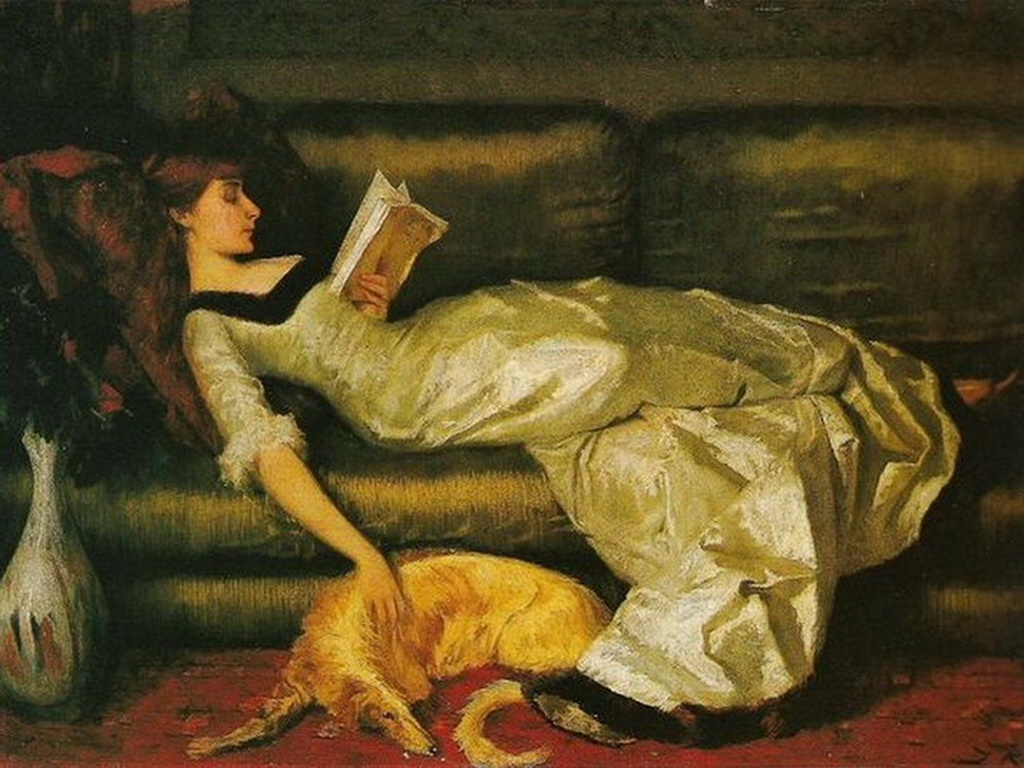
The Artist's Sister Reading (1885–1890)

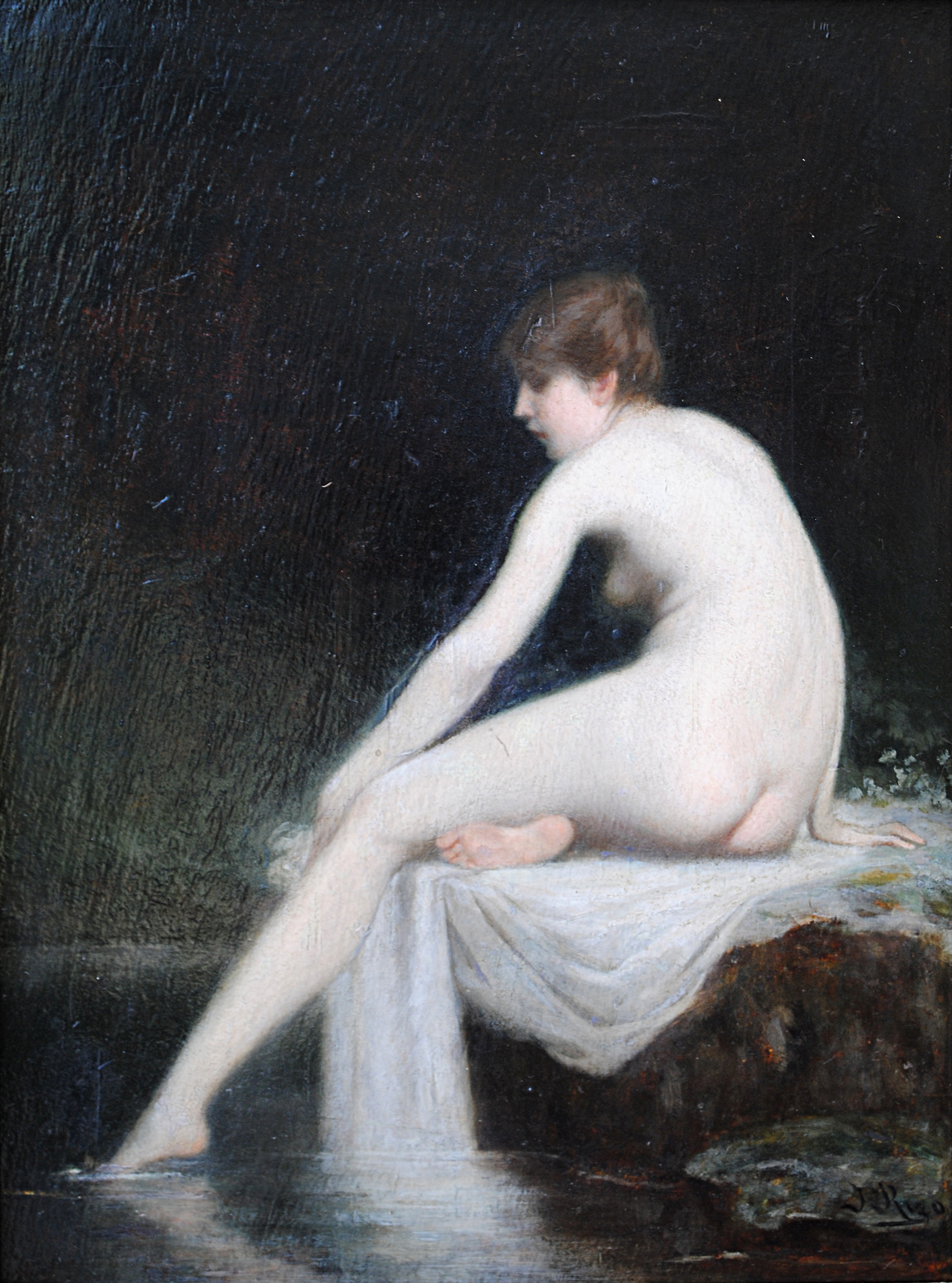
Female Nude, c. (1849–1926)
