= Lazio Pigeon Shooting Stand =

Olympic firing range in Rome, Italy

The Lazio Pigeon Shooting Stand was a temporary firing range built near the Olympic village in Rome. It was used for the trap shooting event for the 1960 Summer Olympics.
