= Cesano Infantry School Range =

Olympic firing range in Cesano, Italy

The Cesano Infantry Shooting Range was a temporary firing range set up by the Italian Army for the infantry off the Via Cassia. It hosted the 300 m free rifle shooting event for the 1960 Summer Olympics in Rome.
