= Nicotinyl alcohol =

Chemical compound

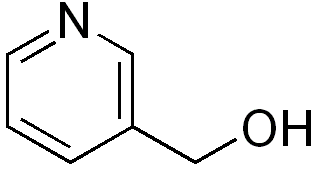

Clinical data
- Other names: Roniacol; Roniacol tartrate; Nicotinyl tartrate; Nicotinyl alcohol tartrate; Nicotinic alcohol; Pyridylcarbinol
- AHFS/Drugs.com: Monograph
- ATC code: C10AD05 (WHO) C04AC02 (WHO)

Identifiers
- IUPAC name: (Pyridin-3-yl)methanol
- CAS Number: 100-55-0
- PubChem CID: 7510
- ChemSpider: 7229
- UNII: 9TF312056Y
- ChEBI: CHEBI:45213
- CompTox Dashboard (EPA): DTXSID6023367
- ECHA InfoCard: 100.002.604

Chemical and physical data
- Formula: C_{6}H_{7}NO
- Molar mass: 109.128 g·mol^{−1}
- 3D model (JSmol): Interactive image
- SMILES: OCc1cccnc1
- InChI: InChI=1S/C6H7NO/c8-5-6-2-1-3-7-4-6/h1-4,8H,5H2

Nicotinyl alcohol (pyridylcarbinol) is a niacin derivative used as a hypolipidemic agent and as a vasodilator. It causes flushing and may decrease blood pressure.

It appears as a crystal that dissolves in water and alcohol with ease, also soluble in ether; melting range 147–148 °C.

Nicotinic acid is a brief peripheral vasodilator; this compound was made to make its action longer and effective. It provokes cutaneous flushing in head and upper thorax with heat, but with no major effects in blood pressure. It is used in peripheral vascular diseases, like arteriosclerosis obliterans, Raynaud's disease, thromboangiitis obliterans (Buerger's disease), arterial embolism, chilblains or migraine associated with vascular spasm.

Fischer and Tebrock worked with this drug in more than two hundred patients for more than three years, achieving effective improvements, mainly in symptoms related to intermittent claudication, ulcer healing and others.

== Derivatives ==
At least a couple of uses for this agent were discovered over the years:

1. Eniclobrate
2. Mepiroxol
3. Nicofibrate
4. Pantenicate (Topanicate, MG 28362)
