= 1960 Summer Olympics =

Multi-sport event in Rome, Italy

Games of the XVII Olympiad
- Emblem of the 1960 Summer Olympics
- Location: Rome, Italy
- Nations: 83
- Athletes: 5,347 (4,734 men, 613 women)
- Events: 150 in 17 sports (23 disciplines)
- Opening: 25 August 1960
- Closing: 11 September 1960
- Opened by: President Giovanni Gronchi
- Closed by: IOC president Avery Brundage
- Cauldron: Giancarlo Peris
- Stadium: Stadio Olimpico

The 1960 Summer Olympics (Italian: Giochi Olimpici estivi del 1960), officially known as the Games of the XVII Olympiad (Italian: Giochi della XVII Olimpiade) and commonly known as Rome 1960 (Italian: Roma 1960), were an international multi-sport event held from 25 August to 11 September 1960 in Rome, Italy. Rome had previously been awarded the administration of the 1908 Summer Olympics. However, following the eruption of Mount Vesuvius in 1906, the city had no choice but to decline and pass the honour to London. The Soviet Union won the most gold and overall medals at the 1960 Games.

The 1st Paralympic Games were held in Rome in conjunction with the 1960 Summer Olympics, marking the first time such events coincided.

== Host city selection ==
On 15 June 1955, at the 50th IOC Session in Paris, France, Rome won the right to host the 1960 Games, having beaten Brussels, Mexico City, Tokyo, Detroit, Budapest and finally Lausanne. Tokyo and Mexico City would subsequently host the proceeding 1964 and 1968 Summer Olympics respectively.

Toronto was initially interested in the bidding, but was automatically removed from consideration when it failed to return the IOC's mandatory questionnaire by the deadline. The questionnaire may have been mislaid in the confusion following the death of the Toronto bid's chief organiser, Robert Hood Saunders, in a plane crash weeks before the deadline. This was the first of five unsuccessful attempts by Toronto to secure the Summer Olympics, the most recent being a bid for the 2008 Games.

1960 Summer Olympics bidding results
City	Country	Round		
City	Country	1	2	3
Rome	Italy	15	26	35
Lausanne	Switzerland	14	21	24
Detroit	United States	6	11	—
Budapest	Hungary	8	1	—
Brussels	Belgium	6	—	—
Mexico City	Mexico	6	—	—
Tokyo	Japan	4	—	—

== Highlights ==
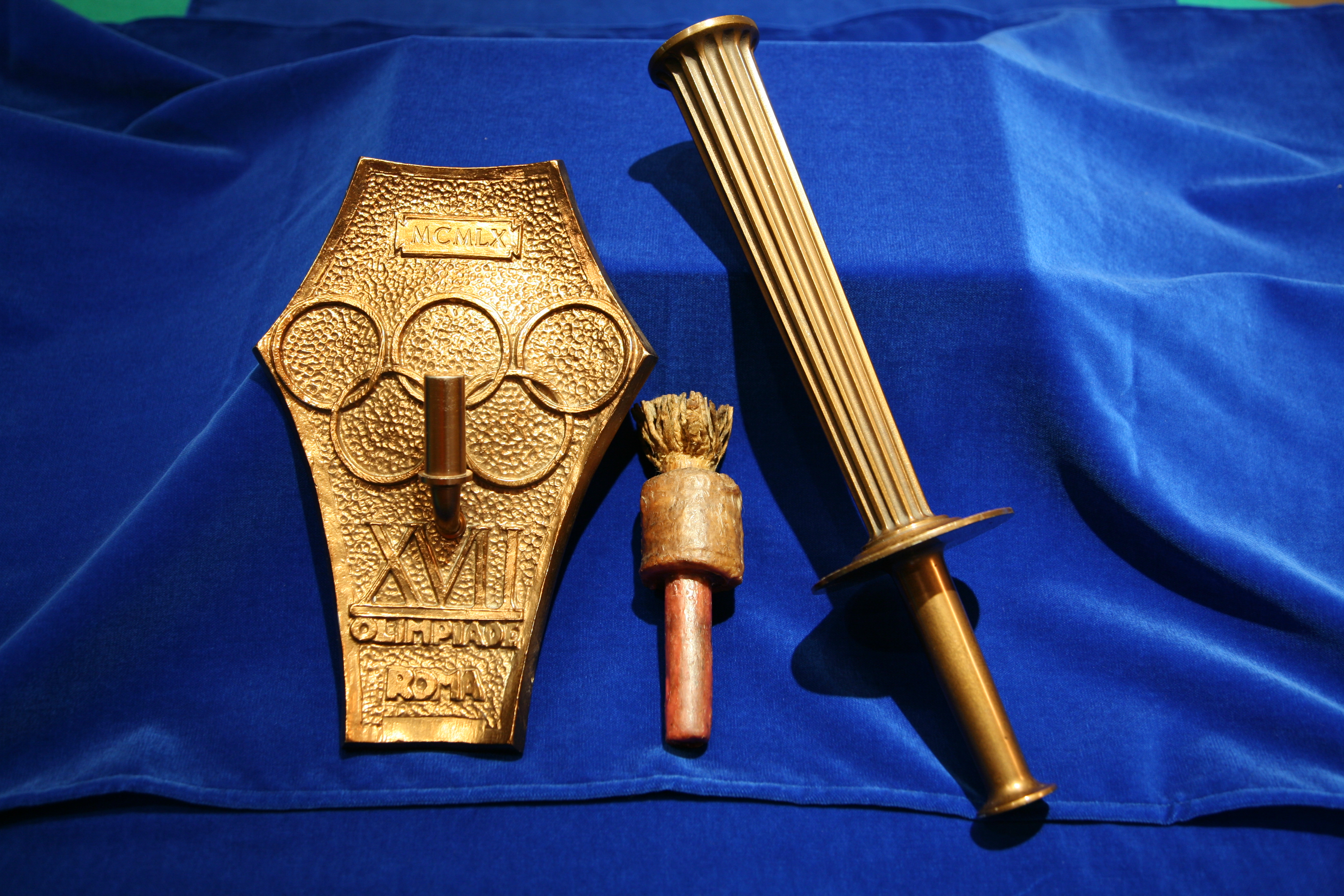
The Olympic Torch of Rome 1960

- Swedish sprint canoeist Gert Fredriksson won his sixth Olympic title.
- Fencer Aladár Gerevich of Hungary won his sixth consecutive gold medal in the team sabre event.
- The Japanese men's gymnastics team won the first of five successive golds (see 1976 Summer Olympics).
- The United States men's national basketball team—led by promising college players Walt Bellamy, Jerry Lucas, Oscar Robertson and Jerry West—captured its fifth straight Olympic gold medal.
- Danish sailor Paul Elvstrøm won his fourth straight gold medal in the Finn class. Others to emulate his performance in an individual event are Al Oerter, Carl Lewis, Michael Phelps, Kaori Icho, Mijaín López and, if the Intercalated (Interspaced) Games of 1906 are included, Ray Ewry.
- German Armin Hary won the 100 metres in an Olympic record time of 10.2 seconds.
- Wilma Rudolph, a former polio patient, won three gold medals in sprint events on the track. She was acclaimed as "the fastest woman in the world".
- Jeff Farrell won two gold medals in swimming. He underwent an emergency appendectomy six days before the Olympic Trials.

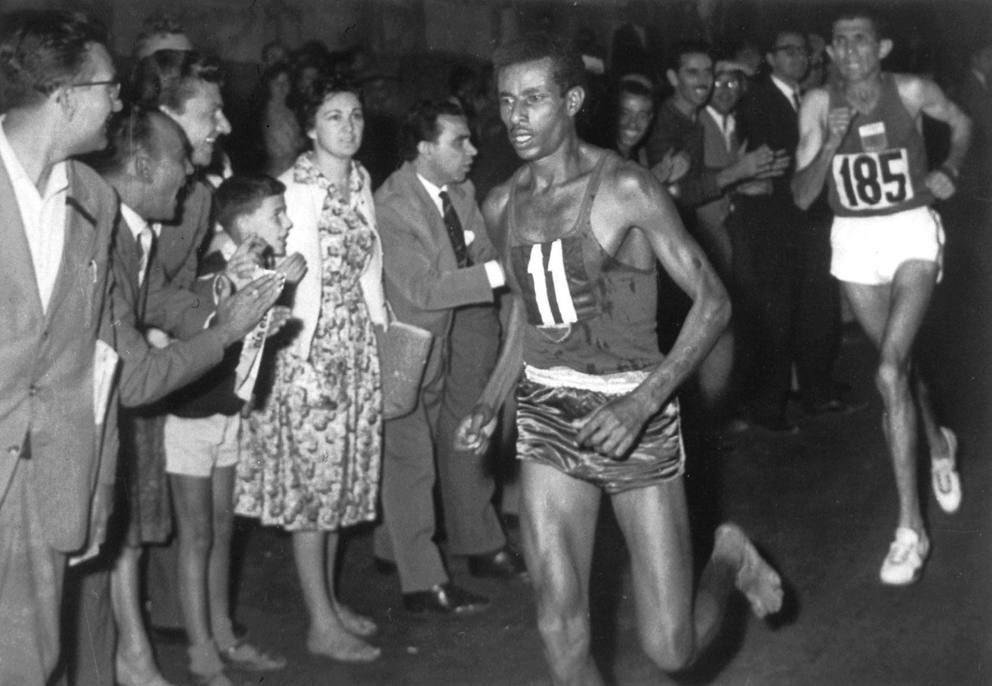
Abebe Bikila of Ethiopia wins the marathon barefooted

- Abebe Bikila of Ethiopia won the marathon barefooted to become the first African and Ethiopian Olympic champion.
- 18-year-old Cassius Clay, later known as Muhammad Ali, won boxing's light-heavyweight gold medal. Ramon "Buddy" Carr was his coach.
- Herb Elliott of Australia won the men's 1500 meters in one of the most dominating performances in Olympic history.
- Rafer Johnson defeated his rival, fellow U.C.L.A. Bruin and friend C.K. Yang in one of the greatest Decathlon events in Olympic history.
- Lance Larson of the United States was controversially denied a 100 metres freestyle swimming gold, despite showing the best time.
- 16-years-old phenom Chris von Saltza won four medals in women's swimming, three of them gold.
- The future Constantine II, last King of Greece (abdicated and ended hybrid monarchy, 1973) won his country a gold in sailing: dragon class.
- The Pakistani Men's Field Hockey team broke a run of Indian team victories since 1928, defeating India in the final and winning Pakistan's first Olympic gold medal.
- Wrestlers Shelby Wilson, and Doug Blubaugh, who wrestled together growing up, won gold medals in their respective weight classes.

=== Lowlights ===
- Danish cyclist Knud Jensen collapsed during the 100km team race because of heat stroke and later died in the hospital. It was suspected that he had been under the influence of Roniacol, a blood circulation stimulant. The International Olympic Committee stated on its website that "drugs were implicated, although that was never proven." It was the second time (and as of 2024, the most recent) an athlete died in competition at the Olympics, after the death of Portuguese marathon runner Francisco Lázaro at the 1912 Summer Olympics.

=== Historical landmarks ===
- South Africa appeared in the Olympic arena for the last time under its apartheid regime. It would not be allowed to return until 1992, by when apartheid in sport was being abolished.
- Singapore competed for the first time under its own flag, which was to become its national flag after independence, as the British had granted it self-government a year earlier. Tan Howe Liang won silver in the Weightlifting lightweight category, which was the first time (and the only time until 2008) that an athlete from Singapore won an Olympic medal.

=== Non-medal winners ===
- Finnish field shooter Vilho Ylönen shot a bullseye to a wrong target; in doing so, he dropped from second place to fourth.
- Peter Camejo, a 2004 American vice-presidential candidate for the Green Party, competed in yachting for Venezuela.
- The future Queen Sofía of Spain represented her native Greece in sailing events.

== Broadcasting ==
- CBS paid US$394,000 (equivalent to $3.28 million in 2025) for the exclusive right to broadcast the Games in the United States. This was the first Summer Olympic games to be telecast in North America. In addition to CBS in the United States, the Olympics were telecast for the first time in Canada (on CBC Television) and in Mexico (through the networks of Telesistema Mexicano). Since television broadcast satellites were still two years into the future, CBS, CBC, and TSM shot and edited videotapes in Rome, fed the tapes to Paris where they were re-recorded onto other tapes which were then loaded onto jet planes to North America. Planes carrying the tapes landed at Idlewild Airport in New York City, where mobile units fed the tapes to CBS, to Toronto for the CBC, and to Mexico City for TSM. Despite this arrangement, many daytime events were broadcast in North America, especially on CBS and CBC, the same day they took place.

== Venues ==
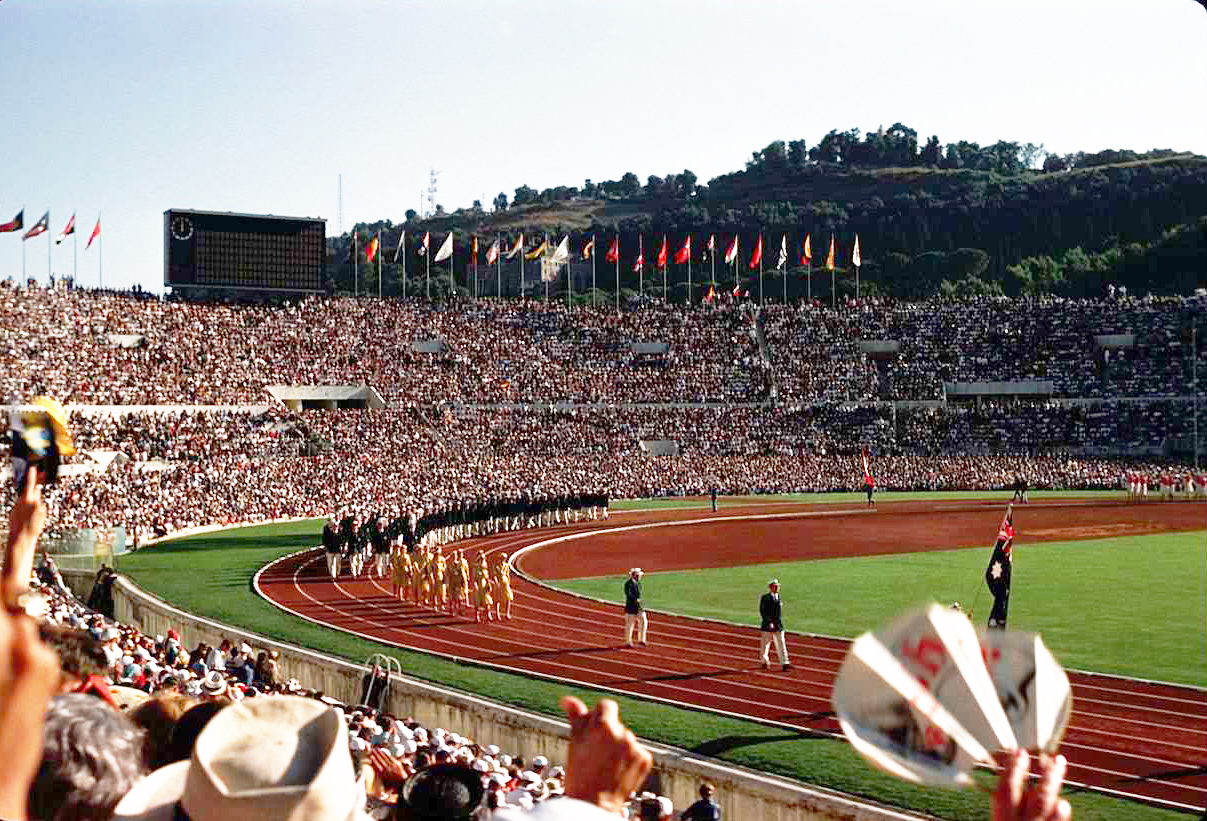
Opening Ceremony in 1960 Summer Olympics in Stadio Olimpico in Rome, Italy

- Olympic Stadium^{2} (Stadio Olimpico) – opening/closing ceremonies, athletics, equestrian events
- Flaminio Stadium^{1} (Stadio Flaminio) – football finals
- Swimming Stadium^{1} – swimming, diving, water polo, modern pentathlon (swimming)
- Sports Palace^{1} (Palazzo dello sport) – basketball, boxing
- Olympic Velodrome^{1} – cycling (track), field hockey
- Small Sports Palace^{1} (Palazzetto dello Sport) – basketball, weightlifting
- Marble Stadium^{2} (Stadio dei Marmi) – field hockey preliminaries
- Baths of Caracalla – gymnastics
- Basilica of Maxentius – wrestling
- Palazzo dei Congressi – fencing
- Umberto I Shooting Range^{1} – modern pentathlon (shooting), shooting (pistol/ rifle)
- Roses Swimming Pool^{1} (Piscina delle Rose) – water polo
- Lake Albano, Castelgandolfo – rowing, canoeing
- Piazza di Siena, Villa Borghese gardens – equestrian (dressage, eventing – jumping, jumping – individual)
- Pratoni del Vivaro, Rocca di Papa – equestrian (eventing)
- Gulf of Naples, Naples – yachting
- Communal Stadium, Florence – football/soccer preliminaries
- Communal Stadium, Grosseto – football/soccer preliminaries
- Communal Stadium, L'Aquila – football/soccer preliminaries
- Ardenza Stadium, Livorno – football/soccer preliminaries
- Adriatico Stadium, Pescara – football/soccer preliminaries
- Saint Paul's Stadium, Naples – football/soccer preliminaries
- Campo Tre Fontane – field hockey preliminaries
- Acqua Santa Golf Club Course – modern pentathlon (running)
- Arch of Constantine – athletics (marathon finish)
- Cesano Infantry School Range – shooting (300 m free rifle)
- Lazio Pigeon Shooting Stand – shooting (trap shotgun)
- Passo Corese – modern pentathlon (riding)
- Grande Raccordo Anulare – athletics (marathon)
- Via Appian Antica – athletics (marathon)
- Via Cassia – cycling (individual road race)
- Via Flaminia – cycling (individual road race)
- Via Cristoforo Colombo – athletics (marathon), cycling (road team time trial)
- Via di Grottarossa – cycling (individual road race)

^{1} New facilities constructed in preparation for the Olympic Games. ^{2} Existing facilities modified or refurbished in preparation for the Olympic Games.

== Participating National Olympic Committees ==
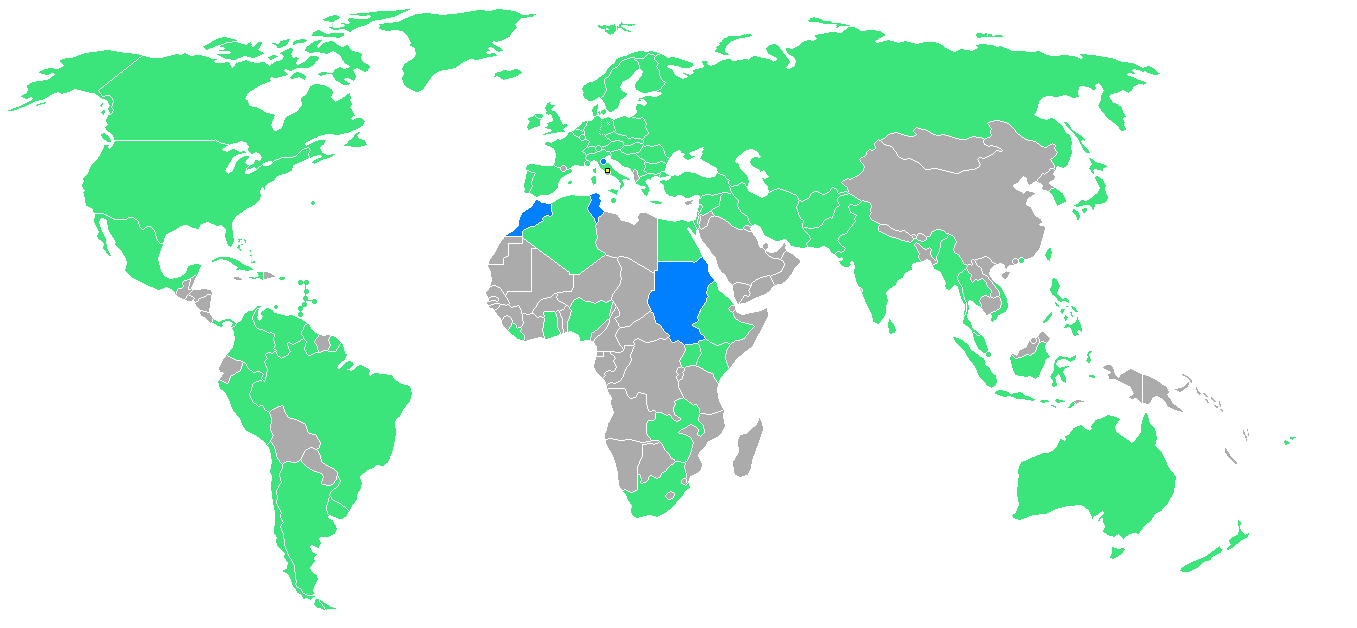
Participants

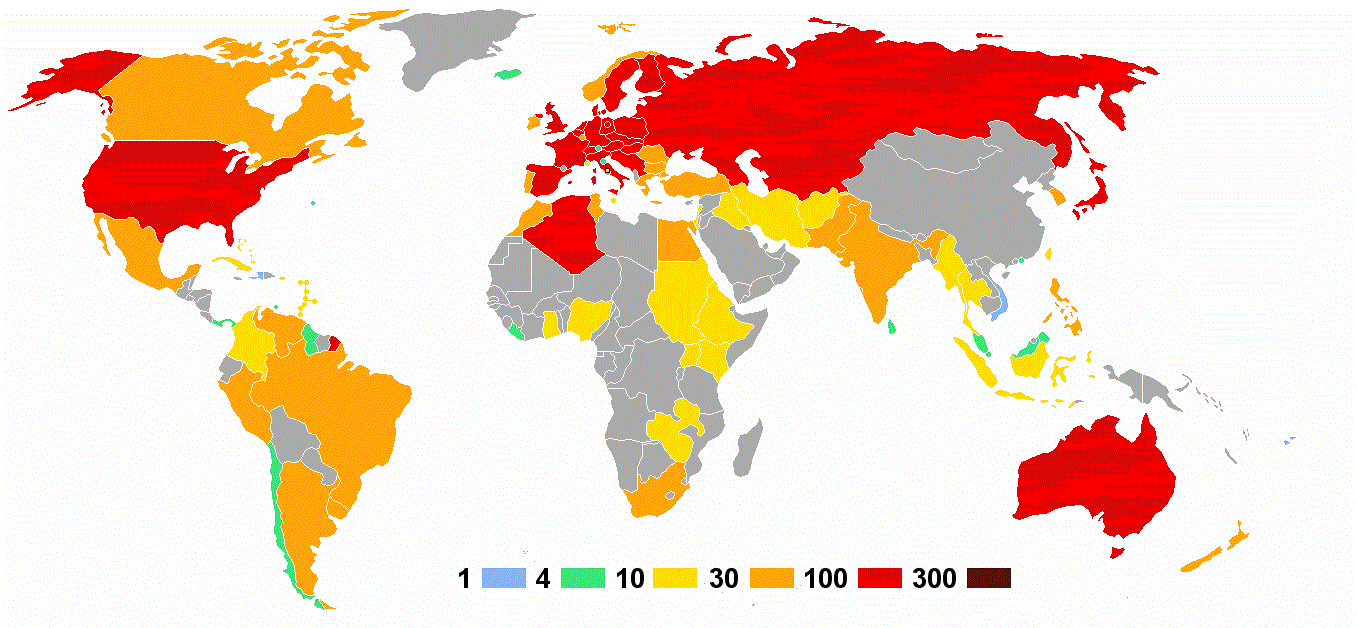
Number of athletes per country

A total of 83 nations participated at the Rome Games. Athletes from Morocco, San Marino, Sudan, and Tunisia competed at the Olympic Games for the first time. Athletes from Barbados, Jamaica and Trinidad and Tobago would represent the new (British) West Indies Federation, competing as "Antilles", but this nation would only exist for this single Olympiad. Athletes from Northern Rhodesia and Southern Rhodesia competed under the Rhodesia name while representing the Federation of Rhodesia and Nyasaland. Athletes from East Germany and West Germany would compete as the United Team of Germany from 1956 to 1964. Athletes from the People's Republic of China last competed at the 1952 Summer Games but had since withdrawn from the Olympic movement due to a dispute with the Republic of China over the right to represent China. The number in parentheses indicates the number of participants that each country contributed.

Participating National Olympic Committees
- Afghanistan (12)
- British West Indies (13)
- Argentina (92)
- Australia (189)
- Austria (103)
- Bahamas (13)
- Belgium (101)
- Bermuda (9)
- Brazil (71)
- Bulgaria (98)
- Burma (10)
- Canada (85)
- Ceylon (5)
- Chile (9)
- Colombia (16)
- Cuba (12)
- Czechoslovakia (116)
- Denmark (100)
- Ethiopia (10)
- Fiji (2)
- Finland (117)
- Formosa (27)
- France (238)
- United Team of Germany (294)
- Ghana (13)
- Great Britain (253)
- Greece (48)
- Guyana (5)
- Haiti (1)
- Hong Kong (4)
- Hungary (180)
- Iceland (9)
- India (45)
- Indonesia (22)
- Iran (23)
- Iraq (21)
- Ireland (49)
- Israel (23)
- Italy (280) (host)
- Japan (162)
- Kenya (27)
- South Korea (35)
- Lebanon (19)
- Liberia (4)
- Liechtenstein (5)
- Luxembourg (52)
- Malaya (9)
- Malta (10)
- Mexico (69)
- Monaco (11)
- Morocco (47)
- Netherlands (110)
- Netherlands Antilles (5)
- New Zealand (37)
- Nigeria (12)
- Norway (40)
- Pakistan (44)
- Panama (6)
- Peru (31)
- Philippines (40)
- Poland (185)
- Portugal (65)
- Puerto Rico (27)
- Rhodesia (14)
- Romania (98)
- San Marino (9)
- Singapore (5)
- South Africa (55)
- Soviet Union (283)
- Spain (144)
- Sudan (10)
- Sweden (134)
- Switzerland (149)
- Thailand (20)
- Tunisia (42)
- Turkey (49)
- Uganda (10)
- United Arab Republic (74)
- United States (292)
- Uruguay (34)
- Venezuela (36)
- Vietnam (3)
- Yugoslavia (116)

- Suriname also made its first Olympic appearance, but its lone athlete (Wim Esajas) withdrew from competition due to a scheduling error.

=== Number of athletes by National Olympic Committees ===
IOC Letter Code	Country	Athletes
AFG	Afghanistan	12
ANT	British West Indies	13
ARG	Argentina	92
AUS	Australia	189
AUT	Austria	103
BAH	Bahamas	17
BEL	Belgium	108
BER	Bermuda	9
BRA	Brazil	71
GUY	Guyana	5
BUL	Bulgaria	98
BIR	Burma	10
CAN	Canada	85
CEY	Ceylon	5
CIL	Chile	9
COL	Colombia	16
CUB	Cuba	12
CSV	Czechoslovakia	116
DAN	Denmark	100
ETI	Ethiopia	10
FIG	Fiji	2
FIN	Finland	117
RCF	Formosa	27
FRA	France	238
EUA	United Team of Germany	294
GHA	Ghana	13
GRB	Great Britain	253
GRE	Greece	48
HAI	Haiti	1
HOK	Hong Kong	4
UNG	Hungary	180
ISL	Iceland	9
IND	India	45
INS	Indonesia	22
IRN	Iran	23
IRK	Iraq	21
IRL	Ireland	49
ISR	Israel	23
ITA	Italy	280
GIA	Japan	162
KEN	Kenya	27
COR	South Korea	35
LIB	Lebanon	19
LBR	Liberia	4
LIE	Liechtenstein	5
LUX	Luxembourg	52
MAL	Malaya	9
MAT	Malta	10
MEX	Mexico	69
MON	Monaco	11
MAR	Morocco	47
PBA	Netherlands	110
ATO	Netherlands Antilles	5
NZL	New Zealand	37
NGR	Nigeria	12
NOR	Norway	40
PAK	Pakistan	44
PAN	Panama	6
PER	Peru	31
PHI	Philippines	40
POL	Poland	185
POR	Portugal	65
PUR	Puerto Rico	27
RHO	Rhodesia	14
ROM	Romania	98
SMA	San Marino	9
SIN	Singapore	5
SAF	South Africa	55
URS	Soviet Union	283
SPA	Spain	144
SUD	Sudan	10
SVE	Sweden	134
SVI	Switzerland	149
THA	Thailand	20
TUN	Tunisia	42
TUR	Turkey	49
UGA	Uganda	10
RAU	United Arab Republic	74
SUA	United States	292
URU	Uruguay	34
VEN	Venezuela	36
VIE	Vietnam	3
JUG	Yugoslavia	116
Total		5,347

== Sports ==
The 1960 Summer Olympics featured 17 different sports encompassing 23 disciplines, and medals were awarded in 150 events. In the list below, the number of events in each discipline is noted in parentheses.

- Aquatics
  - Diving (4)
  - Swimming (15)
  - Water polo (1)
- Athletics (34)
- Basketball (1)
- Boxing (10)
- Canoeing (7)
- Cycling
  - Road (2)
  - Track (4)
- Equestrian
  - Dressage (1)
  - Eventing (2)
  - Jumping (2)
- Fencing (8)
- Field hockey (1)
- Football (1)
- Gymnastics (14)
- Modern pentathlon (2)
- Rowing (7)
- Sailing (5)
- Shooting (6)
- Weightlifting (7)
- Wrestling
  - Freestyle (8)
  - Greco-Roman (8)

=== Calendar ===
All dates are in Central European Time (UTC+1)

OC	Opening ceremony	●	Event competitions	1	Gold medal events	CC	Closing ceremony

August / September	25 Thu	26 Fri	27 Sat	28 Sun	29 Mon	30 Tue	31 Wed	1 Thu	2 Fri	3 Sat	4 Sun	5 Mon	6 Tue	7 Wed	8 Thu	9 Fri	10 Sat	11 Sun	Events
Ceremonies	OC																	CC	—N/a
Athletics							2	4	7	3		3	4	4	6		1		34
Basketball		●	●		●			●	●	●				●	●	●	1		1
Boxing	●	●	●		●	●	●	●	●	●		10							10
Canoeing		●	●		7														7
Cycling		2	1		2	1													6
Diving		●	1		1	1	●	●	1										4
Equestrian												●	1	1	●	●	2	1	5
Fencing					●	1	●	1	1	1		●	1	●	1	1	1		8
Field hockey		●	●		●	●	●	●	●	●	●	●	●	●	●	1	●	●	1
Football		●			●			●				●	●			●	1		1
Gymnastics												●	●	2	2	4	6		14
Modern pentathlon	●	●	●		●	●	2												2
Rowing						●	●	●	●	7									7
Sailing					●	●	●	●				●	●	5					5
Shooting										●		1	1	●	1	2	1		6
Swimming		●	2		1	2	2	3	2	3									15
Water polo	●	●	●		●	●	●	●	●	1									1
Weightlifting														2	2	2	1		7
Wrestling		●	●		●	●	8	●	●	●		●	8						16
Daily medal events		2	4	0	11	5	14	8	11	15	0	14	15	14	12	10	14	1	150
Cumulative total		2	6	6	17	22	36	44	55	70	70	84	99	113	125	135	149	150	150
August / September	25 Thu	26 Fri	27 Sat	28 Sun	29 Mon	30 Tue	31 Wed	1 Thu	2 Fri	3 Sat	4 Sun	5 Mon	6 Tue	7 Wed	8 Thu	9 Fri	10 Sat	11 Sun	Total events

== Medal count ==
These are the top ten nations that won medals at the 1960 Games:

Rank	Nation	Gold	Silver	Bronze	Total
1	Soviet Union	43	29	31	103
2	United States	34	21	16	71
3	Italy*	13	10	13	36
4	United Team of Germany	12	19	11	42
5	Australia	8	8	6	22
6	Turkey	7	2	0	9
7	Hungary	6	8	7	21
8	Japan	4	7	7	18
9	Poland	4	6	11	21
10	Czechoslovakia	3	2	3	8
Totals (10 entries)		134	112	105	351

== See also ==
- 1960 Summer Paralympics
- 1960 Winter Olympics
- Olympic Games held in Italy
  - 1956 Winter Olympics – Cortina D'Ampezzo
  - 1960 Summer Olympics – Rome
  - 2006 Winter Olympics – Turin
  - 2026 Winter Olympics – Milan and Cortina D'Ampezzo
- List of IOC country codes
- Universiades celebrated in Italy
  - 1959 Summer Universiade – Turin
  - 1966 Winter Universiade – Sestriere
  - 1970 Summer Universiade – Turin
  - 1975 Winter Universiade – Livigno
  - 1975 Summer Universiade – Rome
  - 1985 Winter Universiade – Belluno
  - 1997 Summer Universiade – Sicily
  - 2003 Winter Universiade – Tarvisio
  - 2007 Winter Universiade – Turin
  - 2013 Winter Universiade – Trentino
  - 2019 Summer Universiade – Naples
  - 2025 Winter Universiade – Turin
- Deaflympics celebrated in Italy
  - 1957 Summer Deaflympics – Milan
  - 2001 Summer Deaflympics – Rome
  - 2019 Winter Deaflympics – Province of Sondrio

Summer Olympics
Preceded by Melbourne/Stockholm	XVII Olympiad; Rome; 1960	Succeeded by Tokyo
