= Indonesia at the 2025 SEA Games =

- IOC code: INA
- NOC: Indonesian Olympic Committee
- Website: nocindonesia.id (in English)

in Bangkok and Chonburi, Thailand 9–20 December 2025
- Competitors: 1,021 in 49 sports
- Flag bearers: Robi Syianturi (athletics); Megawati Hangestri Pertiwi (volleyball)
- Medals Ranked 2nd: Gold 91 Silver 112 Bronze 130 Total 333

SEA Games appearances (overview)
- 1977; 1979; 1981; 1983; 1985; 1987; 1989; 1991; 1993; 1995; 1997; 1999; 2001; 2003; 2005; 2007; 2009; 2011; 2013; 2015; 2017; 2019; 2021; 2023; 2025; 2027; 2029

Indonesia participated at the 2025 SEA Games in Bangkok and Chonburi, Thailand from 9 to 20 December 2025. The Indonesian contingent consisted of 1,021 athletes.

Initially, Indonesia targeted to secure at least 80 gold medals and the target was achieved and even exceeded, making Indonesia's medal tally at this year's SEA Games the highest since the reform era outside the host nation. Indonesian contingent, officially inaugurated in Jakarta on 5 December 2025, will compete in 49 of the 50 sports featured at Southeast Asia's largest multi-sport event.

Following the inauguration ceremony, Chairman of Indonesian Olympic Committee, Raja Sapta Oktohari, confirmed that the number of athletes representing Indonesian has increased from 996 to 1,021, due to the addition of new events in athletics, cycling, and fencing.

== Medal summary ==
=== Medal by sport ===
Medals by sport
Sport	1st place, gold medalist(s)	2nd place, silver medalist(s)	3rd place, bronze medalist(s)	Total	Rank
Athletics	9	5	6	20	3
Shooting	6	9	8	23	2
Archery	6	0	2	8	1
Wushu	5	3	1	9	1
Sport climbing	4	3	1	8	1
Judo	4	2	1	7	2
Dragon boat	4	2	0	6	1
Pencak silat	4	1	7	12	1
Cycling	3	4	4	11	3
Weightlifting	3	4	1	8	2
Swimming	3	3	5	11	5
Badminton	3	3	4	10	1
Rowing	3	3	1	7	2
Tennis	3	0	6	9	2
Aquathlon	3	0	0	3	1
Canoeing	2	5	6	13	2
Karate	2	4	3	9	3
Taekwondo	2	2	6	10	4
Equestrian	2	2	2	6	2
Triathlon	2	2	1	5	2
Duathlon	2	1	0	3	1
Wrestling	1	6	3	10	2
Boxing	1	4	4	9	3
Kabaddi	1	4	1	6	2
Modern pentathlon	1	4	1	6	3
Pétanque	1	2	3	6	4
Chess	1	2	4	7	2
Gymnastics	1	2	1	4	5
Water skiing	1	2	0	3	2
Kickboxing	1	1	4	6	3
Futsal	1	1	0	2	1
Skateboarding	1	1	0	2	3
Indoor hockey	1	0	1	2	1
Jetski	1	0	1	2	2
3x3 basketball	1	0	0	1	2
Beach Volleyball	1	0	0	1	1
Ice Hockey	1	0	0	1	2
Woodball	0	4	2	6	2
Short-track speed skating	0	3	3	6	3
Teqball	0	3	2	5	2
Billiards and Snooker	0	2	3	5	5
Bowling	0	2	2	4	6
Esports	0	1	4	5	5
Muaythai	0	1	4	5	6
Sepak takraw	0	1	4	5	5
Cricket	0	1	1	2	4
Field hockey	0	1	1	2	2
Golf	0	1	1	2	3
Hockey5s	0	1	1	2	3
Table tennis	0	1	1	2	5
Volleyball	0	1	1	2	2
Water polo	0	1	1	2	3
Baseball5	0	1	0	1	2
Artistic swimming	0	0	2	2	4
Basketball	0	0	2	2	3
Squash	0	0	2	2	4
Ju-jitsu	0	0	2	2	6
Baseball	0	0	1	1	3
Diving	0	0	1	1	5
Handball	0	0	1	1	4
Total	91	112	130	333	2

=== Medal by date ===
Medals by date
Day	Date	1st place, gold medalist(s)	2nd place, silver medalist(s)	3rd place, bronze medalist(s)	Total
—	9 Dec	Opening ceremony			
1	10 Dec	5	9	7	21
2	11 Dec	8	11	6	25
3	12 Dec	7	8	11	26
4	13 Dec	11	18	11	40
5	14 Dec	12	11	18	41
6	15 Dec	9	8	11	28
7	16 Dec	10	7	8	25
8	17 Dec	10	13	22	45
9	18 Dec	8	8	9	25
10	19 Dec	11	19	25	56
11	20 Dec	0	0	2	2
Total		91	112	130	333

=== Medalists ===
Medal	Name	Sport	Event	Date
Gold	Muhammad Alfi Kusuma; Muhammad Hafizh Fachrur Rhozy; Muhammad Rizal	Taekwondo	Men's recognized poomsae team	10 December
Gold	Stevani Maysche Ibo; Subhi; Indra Hidayat; Ramla Baharuddin	Canoeing	Mixed K-4 500 m	10 December
Gold	Andri Irawan	Pétanque	Men's singles	10 December
Gold	Alwi Farhan; Zaki Ubaidillah; Yohanes Saut Marcellyno; Prahdiska Bagas Shujiwo; Leo Rolly Carnando; Bagas Maulana; Sabar Karyaman Gutama; Muhammad Reza Pahlevi Isfahani; Jafar Hidayatullah; Amri Syahnawi	Badminton	Men's team	10 December
Gold	Jason Donovan Yusuf	Swimming	Men's 100 m backstroke	10 December
Gold	Rendy Varera Sanjaya	Cycling	Mountain biking - Men's cross country eliminator	11 December
Gold	Leica Al Humaira Lubis	Karate	Women's kumite +68 kg	11 December
Gold	Stevani Maysche Ibo; Subhi	Canoeing	Mixed K-2 200 m	11 December
Gold	Indra Hardinata; Guruh Dwi Samudra; Safira Ratriandari Widodo; Ummu Thoyibhatus Sholikah	Water ski	Team slalom	11 December
Gold	Jason Donovan Yusuf	Swimming	Men's 50 m backstroke	11 December
Gold	Masniari Wolf	Swimming	Women's 50 m backstroke	11 December
Gold	Agustin Elya Gradita Retong; Dewa Ayu Made Sriartha; Evelyn Fiyo; Kimberley Pierre-Louis	3x3 basketball	Women's team	11 December
Gold	Diva Renatta Jayadi	Athletics	Women's pole vault	11 December
Gold	Dinny Febriany	Judo	Women's under 57 kg	12 December
Gold	Abiyurafi	Artistic gymnastics	Men's horizontal bar	12 December
Gold	Muhammad Rizqi Maulana	Judo	Men's under 55 kg	12 December
Gold	Syerina	Judo	Women's under 70 kg	12 December
Gold	Dina Aulia	Athletics	Women's 100 m hurdles	12 December
Gold	Alma Ariella Tsany	Sport climbing	Women's lead	12 December
Gold	Ardana Cikal Damarwulan	Sport climbing	Men's lead	12 December
Gold	Dominique Rachmawati Karini; Dewi Laila Mubarokah; Yasmin Figlia Achadiat	Shooting	Women's 10 m air rifle team	13 December
Gold	Dewi Laila Mubarokah	Shooting	Women's 10 m air rifle	13 December
Gold	Luluk Diana Tri Wijayana	Weightlifting	Women's 48 kg	13 December
Gold	Ignatius Joshua Kandou	Karate	Men's kumite -75 kg	13 December
Gold	Arya Danu Susilo	Taekwondo	Men's under 74 kg	13 December
Gold	I Made Sastra Dharma	Judo	Men's under 90 kg	13 December
Gold	Maria Natalia Londa	Athletics	Women's triple jump	13 December
Gold	Anjali Kirana Junarto; Priska Madelyn Nugroho; Meydiana Laviola Reinnamah; Aldila Sutjiadi; Janice Tjen	Tennis	Women's team	13 December
Gold	Puja Lestari	Sport climbing	Women's speed	13 December
Gold	Antasyafi Robby Al Hilmi	Sport climbing	Men's speed	13 December
Gold	Christopher Rungkat; Muhammad Rifqi Fitriadi; Ignatius Anthony Susanto; Lucky Candra Kurniawan; Justin Barki	Tennis	Men's team	13 December
Gold	Edgar Xavier Marvelo	Wushu	Men's changquan, daoshu & gunshu	14 December
Gold	Aiman Cahyadi; M. Syelhan Nurrahmat; Maulana Astnan; M. Raihan Maulidan	Cycling	Road - Men's time trial team	14 December
Gold	Muhammad Iqbal Raia Prabowo; Sulthanul Aulia Maruf; Wira Sukmana	Shooting	Men's 10 m air pistol team	14 December
Gold	Alwi Farhan	Badminton	Men's singles	14 December
Gold	Andika Dhanireksa; Asep Yuldan Sani; Rano Slamet Nugraha	Pencak silat	Men's regu	14 December
Gold	Sabar Karyaman Gutama; Muhammad Reza Pahlevi Isfahani	Badminton	Men's doubles	14 December
Gold	Aero Sutan Aswar	Jet skiing	Endurance open	14 December
Gold	Hendro	Athletics	Men's 20 km race walk	14 December
Gold	Robi Syianturi	Athletics	Men's marathon	14 December
Gold	Basral Graito Hutomo	Skateboarding	Men's street	14 December
Gold	Odekta Elvina Naibaho	Athletics	Women's marathon	14 December
Gold	Violine Intan Puspita	Athletics	Women's 20 km race walk	14 December
Gold	Patricia Geraldine	Wushu	Women's changquan, jianshu & qianshu	15 December
Gold	Ayustina Delia Priatna	Cycling	Road - Women's time trial individual	15 December
Gold	Ahmad Ghifari Fuaiz; Ahmad Ghozali Fuaiz; Terrence Tjahyadi	Wushu	Men's duilian bare-handed	15 December
Gold	Muhammad Iqbal Raia Prabowo; Arista Perdana Putri Darmoyo	Shooting	Mixed 10 m air pistol team	15 December
Gold	Tharisa Dea Florentina	Wushu	Women's sanda 56 kg	15 December
Gold	Samuel Marbun	Wushu	Men's sanda 65 kg	15 December
Gold	Rizki Juniansyah	Weightlifting	Men's 79 kg	15 December
Gold	Vincentius Djajadiningrat	Practical shooting	Men's production individual	15 December
Gold	Abdul Hafiz	Athletics	Men's javelin throw	15 December
Gold	Binta Erlen Salsabela; Kayla Nadia Shafa; Martina Ayu Pratiwi	Aquathlon	Women's team relay	16 December
Gold	Muhammad Noval Ashidiq; Al Kautsar; Rashif Amila Yaqin	Aquathlon	Men's team relay	16 December
Gold	La Memo	Rowing	Men's single sculls	16 December
Gold	Ali Mardiansyah; Ihram; Rafiq Wijdan Yasir; Ardi Isadi	Rowing	Men's lightweight quadruple sculls	16 December
Gold	Rashif Amila Yaqin; Kayla Nadia Shafa; Martina Ayu Pratiwi; Muhammad Noval Ashidiq	Aquathlon	Mixed team relay	16 December
Gold	Rahmat Erwin Abdullah	Weightlifting	Men's 88 kg	16 December
Gold	Medina Warda Aulia; Chelsie Monica Ignesias Sihite; Irine Kharisma Sukandar; Dewi Ardhiani Anastasia Citra; Laysa Latifah	Chess	Women's team ASEAN chess rapid	16 December
Gold	Fany Febriana Wulandari	Shooting	Women's trap individual	16 December
Gold	Riyan Jefri Hamonangan Lumbanbatu	Kickboxing	Men's K-1 60 kg	16 December
Gold	Emilia Nova	Athletics	Women's heptathlon	16 December
Gold	Rendi Setia Maulana; La Memo	Rowing	Men's double sculls	17 December
Gold	M Zaki Zikrillah Prasong	Pencak silat	Men's class C	17 December
Gold	Diananda Choirunisa; Rezza Octavia; Ayu Mareta Dyasari	Archery	Women's team recurve	17 December
Gold	Safira Dwi Meilani	Pencak silat	Women's class B	17 December
Gold	Arif Dwi Pangestu; Riau Ega Agata; Ahmad Khoirul Baasith	Archery	Men's team recurve	17 December
Gold	Tito Hendra Septa Kurnia	Pencak silat	Men's class E	17 December
Gold	Diananda Choirunisa	Archery	Women's individual recurve	17 December
Gold	Riau Ega Agata	Archery	Men's individual recurve	17 December
Gold	Muhammad Aliansyah	Wrestling	Men's Greco-Roman 67 kg	17 December
Gold	Brayen Brata-Coolen; Raymen Kaunang; Dirga Wira Ramadhan Saputra; Arserl Rizki Brayudha	Equestrian	Team show jumping	17 December
Gold	Eva Desiana; Zahra Bulan Aprilia Putri; Martina Ayu Pratiwi	Duathlon	Women's duathlon team relay	18 December
Gold	Nina Bonita Pereira Yurike; Nurisa Dian Ashrifah; Ratih Zilzati Fadhly	Archery	Women's team compound	18 December
Gold	Angga Suwandi Putra; Dapit; Dedi Kusmayadi; Ikballana Ikhsan; Indra Tri Setiawan; Irwan; Masrino; Mugi Harjito; Nana Maulana Saepudin; Riyan Prasetio; Sahrul Gunawan; Sutrisno; Yadi; Yuda Firmansyah	Dragon boat	Men's small boat 200 m	18 December
Gold	Alias Praji; Hauqalah Fakhal Arvyello; Zahra Bulan Aprilia Putri; Martina Ayu Pratiwi	Duathlon	Mixed duathlon team relay	18 December
Gold	Nurisa Dian Ashrifah	Archery	Women's individual compound	18 December
Gold	Indonesia	Dragon boat	Mixed standard boat 200 m	18 December
Gold	Dea Salsabila Putri	Modern pentathlon	Women's triathle individual	18 December
Gold	Ni Komang Tri Meiyoni; Yuni Amirta Nadila; Ni Luh Happy Restia Dewi; Oktavia Riska Della; Ni Kadek Ari Wartini	Kabaddi	Women's three stars	18 December
Gold	Martina Ayu Pratiwi	Triathlon	Women's individual	19 December
Gold	Rashif Amila Yaqin	Triathlon	Men's individual	19 December
Gold	Angga Suwandi Putra; Dapit; Dedi Kusmayadi; Ikballana Ikhsan; Indra Tri Setiawan; Irwan; Masrino; Mugi Harjito; Nana Maulana Saepudin; Riyan Prasetio; Sahrul Gunawan; Sutrisno; Yadi; Yuda Firmansyah	Dragon boat	Men's small boat 500 m	19 December
Gold	Aldila Sutjiadi; Janice Tjen	Tennis	Women's doubles	19 December
Gold	Bintang Akbar; Sofyan Rachman Efendi; Yosi Ariel Firnanda; Danangsyah Pribadi	Beach volleyball	Men's team	19 December
Gold	Adila Desvi Rahayu; Angga Suwandi Putra; Dapit; Dayumin; Dedi Kusmayadi; Devita Safitri; Handayani; Indra Tri Setiawan; Irwan; Maryati; Masrino; Mugi Harjito; Nadia Hafiza; Nana Maulana Saepudin; Nur Meni; Ramla Baharuddin; Ratih; Reski Wahyuni; Ririn Puji Astuti; Riska Andriyani; Riyan Prasetio; Sahrul Gunawan; Sri Kandi; Sutrisno; Yadi; Yuda Firmansyah	Dragon boat	Mixed standard boat 500 m	19 December
Gold	Brayen Brata-Coolen	Equestrian	Individual show jumping	19 December
Gold	Indonesia	Indoor hockey	Men's team	19 December
Gold	Vicky Tahumil Junior	Boxing	Men's 51 kg	19 December
Gold	Faigan Alghani; Muchammad Athalaa Alqaeda; M. Abyan Putra Arlan; Daffa Abyan Bagaskara; Daffa Fadilla; Raihan Jufino Hafiz; Haykal Kaykobad Hasyim; Arthur Jordan; Adel Khabibullin; Artem Bezrukov; Evgueni Nourislamov; Savelii Molchanov; M. Arsky Jayden Zen Naga; Jonathan Ryan Ferry Nugraha; Jeremiah Ong Praptasuganda; Rizqi Akira Rachman Prijanto; Sangga Munggaran Putra; Izzan Labib Rais; Lucas Nathaniel Valiant Salomo; Anryan Saputra; Ammar Rafandra Saputro; Aditia Sutanto; Ronald Wijaya	Ice hockey	Men's team	19 December
Gold	Ardiansyah Nur; Ahmad Habiebie; Syauqi Saud; Firman Adriansyah; Muhammad Nizar; Mochammad Iqbal Rahmattulah; Israr Megantara; Muhammad Rizki Xavier; Reza Gunawan; Samuel Eko; Evan Soumilena; Brian Ick; Romi Humandri; Dewa Rizki Amanda	Futsal	Men's team	19 December
Silver	Rendy Varera Sanjaya	Cycling	Mountain biking - Men's downhill	10 December
Silver	Riska Amelia Agustina	Cycling	Mountain biking - Women's downhill	10 December
Silver	Krisna Septiana	Canoeing	Men's kayak single slalom	10 December
Silver	Putu Santhi	Canoeing	Women's canoe single slalom	10 December
Silver	Putri Kusuma Wardani; Gregoria Mariska Tunjung; Mutiara Ayu Puspitasari; Ni Kadek Dhinda Amartya Pratiwi; Febriana Dwipuji Kusuma; Meilysa Trias Puspita Sari; Rachel Allessya Rose; Febi Setianingrum; Felisha Alberta Nathaniel Pasaribu; Nita Violina Marwah	Badminton	Women's team	10 December
Silver	Ardam; Asrul Alam; Achmad Fachrizal; Ahmad Firki Nur Hikmat; Fadli Muhamad; Alfandy Aly Surya Prastyo; Mochamad Fathur Rochman; Julius Rizhad Rumaropen; Ahdan Asasi Ramadhan Uno; Nurul Maulana Yusuf	Hockey5s	Men's team	10 December
Silver	Topan Satria	Pétanque	Men's shooting	10 December
Silver	Susanto Megaranto; Novendra Priasmoro; Mohamad Ervan; Nayaka Budhidharma	Chess	Men's makruk triple blitz	10 December
Silver	Farrel Armandio Tangkas	Swimming	Men's 100 m backstroke	10 December
Silver	Ade Yoan Susanto	Canoeing	Men's canoe single slalom	11 December
Silver	Kadek Shintha	Canoeing	Women's kayak single slalom	11 December
Silver	Daniel	Karate	Men's kumite +84 kg	11 December
Silver	Mugi Harjito; Abdul Hamid	Canoeing	Men's K-2 200 m	11 December
Silver	Annabella Putri Yohanna; Emilia Putri Rahmanda	Billiards and snooker	Women's team snooker	11 December
Silver	Jason; Kanaya Anindita; Rahmadani Citra Mahaueni; Kevin Gladian	Water ski	Team wakeboard	11 December
Silver	Melani; Aldi Akmaludin; Kevin Gilbert Fotaroma; Piki Lestari	Water ski	Team wake surf	11 December
Silver	Aziz Hidayat Tumakaka	Taekwondo	Men's under 54 kg	11 December
Silver	Wahyudi Putra	Athletics	Men's 1500 m	11 December
Silver	Lalu Muhammad Zohri	Athletics	Men's 100 m	11 December
Silver	Muhammad Aprizal	Artistic gymnastics	Men's apparatus rings	11 December
Silver	Ni Kadek Ariani; Fatima Zahrah Albanjari; Ni Luh Wesika Ratna Dewi; Kisi Salisa Kasse; I Dewa Ayu D. A. Laksmi; Sang Ayu Maypriani; Rahmawati Dwi Pangestuti; Lie Qiao; Ni Kadek Fitria Rada Rani; Ni Putu Ayu Nanda Sakarini; Ni Wayan Sariani; Emily Sirs; Ni Made Putri Suwandewi; Maria Corazon K. Wombaki; Desi Wulandari	Cricket	Women's T10	12 December
Silver	Mhd Raihan Fadila	Taekwondo	Men's under 80 kg	12 December
Silver	Yemima Natalia Sinaga	Shooting	Women's skeet individual	12 December
Silver	Satria Tri Wira Yudha	Artistic gymnastics	Men's parallel bars	12 December
Silver	Emilia Nova	Athletics	Women's 100 m hurdles	12 December
Silver	Sukma Lintang Cahyani	Sport climbing	Women's lead	12 December
Silver	Surya Aditya Pratama; I Gede Prabawa Darma Nugraha Mapet; Rifqi Najmuddin Najib; Gusti Putu Eddy Supriyadinata; Muhamad Khadiq; Alberthus Nathan Yusanto	Woodball	Men's team fairway	12 December
Silver	Ni Luh Made Tahlia Saraswati; Nurizza Nova Mindayati; Ni Luh Manik Purwati; Dwi Tiga Putri; Nur Hafifa Syarah	Woodball	Women's team fairway	12 December
Silver	Dominique Rachmawati Karini	Shooting	Women's 10 m air rifle	13 December
Silver	Ahmad Ghifari Fuaiz; Edgar Xavier Marvelo; Seraf Naro Siregar	Wushu	Men's duilian weapon	13 December
Silver	Ceyco Georgia Zefanya	Karate	Women's kumite -68 kg	13 December
Silver	Arif Fadhilah	Karate	Men's kumite -84 kg	13 December
Silver	Ricko Saputra	Weightlifting	Men's 60 kg	13 December
Silver	Indah Permatasari	Judo	Women's +78 kg	13 December
Silver	Gede Ganding Kalbu Soethama	Judo	Men's under 100 kg	13 December
Silver	Yoga Ardika Putra	Teqball	Men's singles	13 December
Silver	Zikhra Dwi Putri	Teqball	Women's singles	13 December
Silver	La Ode Mardan M Husni Uba	Teqball	Men's doubles	13 December
Silver	Susan Nurhidayah	Sport climbing	Women's speed	13 December
Silver	Alfian Muhammad Fajri	Sport climbing	Men's speed	13 December
Silver	Welda Agapindo; Riko Ganda Febryyanto; Jamhur Hatta; Steven Menayang	Equestrian	Team eventing	13 December
Silver	Tasya Ayu Puspa Dewi; Eugenia Diva Widodo	Wushu	Women's duilian bare-handed	13 December
Silver	Annabella Putri Yohanna; Emilia Putri Rahmanda	Billiards and snooker	Women's team 6 red snooker	13 December
Silver	Joe Aditya Wijaya Kurniawan	Swimming	Men's 100 m butterfly	13 December
Silver	Surya Aditya Pratama; I Gede Prabawa Darma Nugraha Mapet; Rifqi Najmuddin Najib; Gusti Putu Eddy Supriyadinata; Muhamad Khadiq; Alberthus Nathan Yusanto	Woodball	Men's team stroke	13 December
Silver	Ni Luh Made Tahlia Saraswati; Nurizza Nova Mindayati; Ni Luh Manik Purwati; Dwi Tiga Putri; Nur Hafifa Syarah	Woodball	Women's team stroke	13 December
Silver	Seraf Naro Siregar	Wushu	Men's changquan, daoshu & gunshu	14 December
Silver	Alfaro Menayang; Dara Ninggar Prameswari; Audirania Amanda Putri; Karen Leticia Herjawan	Equestrian	Team dressage	14 December
Silver	Muhammad Mahsa Wildanur; Rahmah Delima Putri; Bachtiar Sanjaya; Rafael Mc Guire Richardo; Nicole Astrella Hermanto; Maria Maggiore Judith; Jaya Gustiar; Kadek Sinta Dwi Maharani	Baseball5	Mixed team	14 December
Silver	Febriana Dwipuji Kusuma; Meilysa Trias Puspita Sari	Badminton	Women's doubles	14 December
Silver	Daniel; Nur Halim Arlendi; Arif Fadhillah; Muhammad Tegar Januar; Ignatius Joshua Kandou; I Komang Astawa Setiabudi	Karate	Men's team kumite	14 December
Silver	Zaki Ubaidillah	Badminton	Men's singles	14 December
Silver	Natasya Beteyob	Weightlifting	Women's 58 kg	14 December
Silver	Kenneth Henson Sutianto; Rayhan Abdul Latief; Amadeus Christian Susanto	Golf	Men's team	14 December
Silver	Ni Wayan Malana Fairbrother	Skateboarding	Women's street	14 December
Silver	Muhammad Iriansyah; I Gusti Agung Eka Wibawa Dana; I Made Dwiki Sanjaya; I Komang Wahyu Brahmasta; I Gede Jaya Guna; I Putu Ngurah Krisna Adipranata; I Putu Darma Indrawan; I Made Suastika; I Made Widi Januarta; Gd Yoga Pratama Artha Bhaskara; Ervin; David Rinekso Pribadi	Kabaddi	Men's standard style	14 December
Silver	Ni Komang Trisna Arkasari; Ni Komang Tri Meiyoni; Made Dhyani Pramestya Dewi; Yuni Amirta Nadila; Ni Made Dwiyani Putri; Ni Luh Happy Restia Dewi; Ni Komang Pebriyanti; Ni Putu Nadine Aristya Dewi; Oktavia Riska Della; Dewa Ayu Sri Wahyuni; Ni Kadek Ari Wartini; Ni Putu Alya Virda Yanti	Kabaddi	Women's standard style	14 December
Silver	Muhammad Muhlis Harliza; Bagas Syarief Hidayat; Dhoni Wahyu Krisbiantoro	Pétanque	Men's triples	15 December
Silver	Pandu Sukarya	Athletics	Men's 3000 m steeplechase	15 December
Silver	Silfanus Ndiken	Athletics	Men's javelin throw	15 December
Silver	Indah Afriza	Weightlifting	Women's 69 kg	15 December
Silver	Farrel Armandio Tangkas	Swimming	Men's 200 m backstroke	15 December
Silver	Prabu Rakyan Raka Nalyndra	Practical shooting	Men's open individual	15 December
Silver	Sarah Ayu Tamaela	Practical shooting	Women's open individual	15 December
Silver	Putri Azizah Haryanto	Practical shooting	Women's standard individual	15 December
Silver	Nur Azizah Patwa; Andi Reski Rahmawati; Yunita Huby; Aisah Nabila	Rowing	Women's four	16 December
Silver	Leni; Dona Aulia; Fujy Anggy Lestari; Rusdi; Jelki Ladada; Muhammad Hardiansyah Muliang	Sepak takraw	Mixed quadrant	16 December
Silver	Muhammad Syelhan	Cycling	Road - Men's road race individual	16 December
Silver	Aiman Cahyadi; M. Syelhan Nurrahmat; Maulana Astnan; M. Raihan Maulidan; M. Abdurrohman	Cycling	Road - Men's road race team	16 December
Silver	Ariyanta Sitepu	Kickboxing	Men's point fighting 63 kg	16 December
Silver	Muhammad Iriansyah; I Gusti Agung Eka Wibawa Dana; I Made Dwiki Sanjaya; I Komang Wahyu Brahmasta; I Gede Jaya Guna; I Putu Ngurah Krisna Adipranata; I Putu Darma Indrawan; I Made Suastika; I Made Widi Januarta; Gd Yoga Pratama Artha Bhaskara; Ervin; David Rinekso Pribadi	Kabaddi	Men's super five	16 December
Silver	Ni Komang Trisna Arkasari; Ni Komang Tri Meiyoni; Made Dhyani Pramestya Dewi; Yuni Amirta Nadila; Ni Made Dwiyani Putri; Ni Luh Happy Restia Dewi; Ni Komang Pebriyanti; Ni Putu Nadine Aristya Dewi; Oktavia Riska Della; Dewa Ayu Sri Wahyuni; Ni Kadek Ari Wartini; Ni Putu Alya Virda Yanti	Kabaddi	Women's super five	16 December
Silver	Binta Erlen Salsabela; Kayla Nadia Shafa; Martina Ayu Pratiwi	Triathlon	Women's triathlon team relay	17 December
Silver	Aprianto; Ferdiansyah	Rowing	Men's lightweight pair	17 December
Silver	Khoirudin Mustakim	Pencak silat	Men's under 45 kg	17 December
Silver	Rashif Amila Yaqin; Kayla Nadia Shafa; Martina Ayu Pratiwi; Aloysius Reckyardo Mardian	Triathlon	Mixed triathlon team relay	17 December
Silver	Rihadatul Asyifa; Shiva Awallu Nissa; Juliani Wenas	Shooting	Women's team 25 m pistol	17 December
Silver	Aryamaulida Kartika Pertiwi	Weightlifting	Women's 77 kg	17 December
Silver	Audrey Zahra Dhiyaanisa	Shooting	Women's 50 m rifle 3 positions	17 December
Silver	Andika Sulaeman	Wrestling	Men's Greco-Roman 77 kg	17 December
Silver	Ashar Ramadhani	Wrestling	Men's Greco-Roman 97 kg	17 December
Silver	Lulut Gilang Saputra	Wrestling	Men's Greco-Roman 87 kg	17 December
Silver	Putty Armein; Alisha Nabila Larasati	Bowling	Women's doubles	17 December
Silver	Fadhil Aulia Mufti	Modern pentathlon	Men's laser run individual	17 December
Silver	Aldento Brilian Bara P	Muaythai	Men's waikru individual	17 December
Silver	Alias Praji; Hauqalah Fakhal Arvyello; Ronal Bintang Setiawan	Duathlon	Men's duathlon team relay	18 December
Silver	Adila Desvi Rahayu; Dayumin; Devita Safitri; Handayani; Maryati; Nadia Hafiza; Nur Meni; Nurevani Feraliana; Ramla Baharuddin; Ratih; Reski Wahyuni; Ririn Puji Astuti; Riska Andriyani; Sri Kandi	Dragon boat	Women's small boat 200 m	18 December
Silver	Marva Kayana Putra Firdaus; Jeremia Wihardja; Kierana Alexandra Laut; Arsa Mizan Putra Firdaus; Steavanus Wihardja; Dhinda Salsabila	Short-track speed skating	Mixed team relay	18 December
Silver	Farras Satrio Aris Sugianto	Modern pentathlon	Men's triathle individual	18 December
Silver	Diah Tri Lestari; Suciana Yuliani; Fitry Amelya; Dhea Febrina Bangun; Sella Salsadila Agustin; Novita Murni Piranti; Fitri Sundari; Nisma Francida Rusdiana; Fitri Rosdiana; Agnes Matulapelwa	Futsal	Women's team	18 December
Silver	Mutiara Ayuningtias	Wrestling	Women's freestyle 53 kg	18 December
Silver	Mutoharoh	Wrestling	Women's freestyle 57 kg	18 December
Silver	Rafli Aidil Fitrah; Muh Raehan; Adrian; Adam Ramdani; Kahfi Alfathan	Esports	Free Fire team	18 December
Silver	Adila Desvi Rahayu; Dayumin; Devita Safitri; Handayani; Maryati; Nadia Hafiza; Nur Meni; Nurevani Feraliana; Ramla Baharuddin; Ratih; Reski Wahyuni; Ririn Puji Astuti; Riska Andriyani; Sri Kandi	Dragon boat	Women's small boat 500 m	19 December
Silver	Sharon Adelina Liman Santoso; Aldila Indryati; Putty Armein; Alisha Nabila Larasati	Bowling	Women's team of four	19 December
Silver	Novian Dwiputra; Revanza Rizky Rahman; Regi Mulya Ramdhani; Ahmad Fauzy Mappatabe; Rezabakti Mulia; Muhamad Zein Dzaki; Julian; Didi Akbar; Delvin Felliciano; Avicenna Aqeel Umarella; Ridjkie Mulia; Hosea Krisna Setiawan; Brahni Cahyandra Samudera; Muhammad Alwi Irhash; Rezza Auditya Putra; Hizkia Bimantoro	Water polo	Men's team	19 December
Silver	Sri Rahayu; Rasgita; Dea Destian; Lispa; Erika Engelika Kbarek; Richa Azlia; Dian Wildiani; Selly Amalia Florentina; Nisa Indira; Widiyana Saruli; Lily Erlina Pasaribu; Innes Aditya; Tiarma Sirait; Natasya Naiborhu; Nur Anisa; Iryani Rumbiak; Asri Dewi Prasasti; Salma Maulani	Field hockey	Women's team	19 December
Silver	Muhammad Fawwaz Aditia Farrel; Dewa Putu Yadi Suteja; Anang Yulianto	Shooting	Men's 25 m rapid fire pistol team	19 December
Silver	Dewa Putu Yadi Suteja	Shooting	Men's 25 m rapid fire pistol	19 December
Silver	GIlang Ilhaza	Wrestling	Men's freestyle 74 kg	19 December
Silver	Jordan Susanto; Boy Arnez Arabi; Hendra Kurniawan; Rama Fazza Fauzan; Alfin Daniel Pratama; Fahry Septian Putratama; Rivan Nurmulki; Daffa Naufal Mauluddani; Kristoforus Sina; Jasen Natanael Kilanta; Agil Angga Anggara; Fahreza Rakha Abhinaya; Tedi Oka Syahputra; Prasojo	Volleyball	Men's team	19 December
Silver	Nabila Maharani	Boxing	Women's 54 kg	19 December
Silver	Huswatun Hasanah	Boxing	Women's 63 kg	19 December
Silver	Asri Udin	Boxing	Men's 60 kg	19 December
Silver	Maikhel Roberrd Muskita	Boxing	Men's 80 kg	19 December
Silver	Medina Warda Aulia; Irene Kharisma Sukandar; Dewi Ardhiani Anastasia Citra	Chess	Women's chess double rapid	19 December
Silver	Muhammad Ifsan	Modern pentathlon	Men's obstacle laser run	19 December
Silver	Caroline Andita Bangun	Modern pentathlon	Women's obstacle laser run	19 December
Silver	Dhinda Salsabila	Short-track speed skating	Women's speed skating 500 m	19 December
Silver	Marva Kayana Putra Firdaus; Kayshan Azri Putra Firdaus; Arsa Mizan Putra Firdaus; Jeremia Wihardja; Steavanus Wihardja; Radika Rais Ananda	Short-track speed skating	Men's speed skating open relay 5,000 m	19 December
Silver	Arni Silva Pattipeiluhu	Rowing	Women's solo CW1X	19 December
Silver	Muhammad Bima Abdi Negara	Table tennis	Men's singles	19 December
Bronze	Herlin Aprilin Lali; Sella Monim	Canoeing	Women's C-2 500 m	10 December
Bronze	Subhi; Ramla Baharuddin	Canoeing	Mixed K-2 500 m	10 December
Bronze	Lispa; Innes Aditya; Selly Amalia Florentina; Nisa Indira; Erika Engelika Kbarek; Salma Maulani; Natasya Naiborhu; Asri Dewi Prasasti; Sri Rahayu; Tiarma Sirait	Hockey5s	Women's team	10 December
Bronze	Artz Brilliant Perfecto	Ju-jitsu	Men's 77 kg	10 December
Bronze	Steefanny Kinky Henandhita	Ju-jitsu	Women's 52 kg	10 December
Bronze	Anjani Dwi Apriliah	Pétanque	Women's singles	10 December
Bronze	Anni Saputri Nijamudin	Pétanque	Women's shooting	10 December
Bronze	Evans Monim; Sofiyanto	Canoeing	Men's C-2 200 m	11 December
Bronze	Emilia Sri Hanandyta; Dian Monika Nababan; Beatrix Helena Pangemanan	Karate	Women's team kata	11 December
Bronze	Ni Kadek Heni Prikasih	Taekwondo	Women's under 46 kg	11 December
Bronze	Osanando Naufal Khairudin	Taekwondo	Men's under 87 kg	11 December
Bronze	I Gede Siman Sudartawa	Swimming	Men's 50 m backstroke	11 December
Bronze	Maria Andriani Melabessy	Athletics	Women's pole vault	11 December
Bronze	Ranjani; Akbar Kurniawan; Diva Reza Fabil; Yana Gerhana; Muhammad Ikbal; Muhammad Vendy Kurniawan; Nazrey Lazuardi; Aditya Muflih Mahmud; Hadi Nur Muhammad; Narendra Bismo Nugroho; Aditya Aulia Rachman; Rizki Ramadhan; Rizki Jodiansyah Ramadhan; Teuku Muhammad Emille Rasya; Rawafi Yaputra Yanto Rozali; Ray Theodore Santoso; Nanda Dwi Saputra; Andrew Putra Soetyono; I Gede Ricky Takahashi Suasta; Rui Takahashi; I Gusti Lanang Agung Trianjana; Alexander Rudolf Wibowo; Muhammad Arrifqi Zavianda; Faldy Akhmad Zulfikar	Baseball	Men's baseball	12 December
Bronze	Herlin Aprilin Lali; Sella Monim	Canoeing	Women's C-2 200 m	12 December
Bronze	Sofiyanto; Roby Kuswandi; Evans Monim; Muh Burhan; Rudiansyah	Canoeing	Men's C-4 200 m	12 December
Bronze	Subhi; Wandi; Evans Monim; Abdul Hamid; Mugi Harjito; Indra Hidayat; Dede Sunandar	Canoeing	Men's K-4 200 m	12 December
Bronze	Winda Dwi Putri	Taekwondo	Women's under 49 kg	12 December
Bronze	Dewa Kadek Rama Warma Putra	Judo	Men's under 73 kg	12 December
Bronze	Hilda Tri Julyandra; Talitha Amabelle Putri Subeni	Artistic swimming	Women's duet	12 December
Bronze	Salsabilla Hadi Pamungkas	Artistic gymnastics	Women's floor	12 December
Bronze	Adelia Chantika Aulia	Swimming	Women's 200 m backstroke	12 December
Bronze	Mahesa Caesar	Sport climbing	Men's lead	12 December
Bronze	Idan Fauzan Richsan	Athletics	Men's decathlon	12 December
Bronze	Ni Made Dwi Kartika Apriyanti	Karate	Women's kumite -61 kg	13 December
Bronze	Akyko Micheel Kapito; Gabriella Jessica Pongbura	Teqball	Women's doubles	13 December
Bronze	Sumaya; Muhammad Azwar	Teqball	Mixed doubles	13 December
Bronze	Megawati Tamesti Maheswari	Taekwondo	Women's under 53 kg	13 December
Bronze	Silvana Lamanda	Taekwondo	Women's under 57 kg	13 December
Bronze	Muhammad Bassam Raihan	Taekwondo	Men's under 63 kg	13 December
Bronze	Medina Warda Aulia; Mohamad Ervan; Novendra Priasmoro; Susanto Megaranto	Chess	Mixed makruk team standard	13 December
Bronze	Heriyanto; Warda Asifa; Andreas Saputra Suwajianto	Pétanque	Mixed triples team	13 December
Bronze	Flairene Candrea	Swimming	Women's 100 m backstroke	13 December
Bronze	Rani Asriani Rahman; Rasya Annisa Rahman; Nawrah Qanitah Zhafirah; Auliya Mustika Putri; Khansa Fathiyyah Zahrani Saman; Mutiara Nur Azisah; Nurfa Nurul Utami; Amandha Mutiara Putri	Artistic swimming	Women's team	13 December
Bronze	Steven Menayang	Equestrian	Eventing individual	13 December
Bronze	Jafar Hidayatullah; Felisha Alberta Nathaniel Pasaribu	Badminton	Mixed doubles	14 December
Bronze	Rachel Allessya Rose; Febi Setianingrum	Badminton	Women's doubles	14 December
Bronze	Sulthanul Aulia Maruf	Shooting	Men's 10 m air pistol	14 December
Bronze	Eko Yuli Irawan	Weightlifting	Men's 65 kg	14 December
Bronze	Ni Made Dwi Kartika Aprianti; Nurmala Erlyawati; Cok Istri Agung Sanistyarani; Ceyco Georgia Zefanya	Karate	Women's team kumite	14 December
Bronze	Leo Rolly Carnando; Bagas Maulana	Badminton	Men's doubles	14 December
Bronze	Putri Kusuma Wardani	Badminton	Women's singles	14 December
Bronze	Susilo Marga Nugraha	Woodball	Men's single stroke	14 December
Bronze	Febriyanti	Woodball	Women's single stroke	14 December
Bronze	Puspa Arumsari	Pencak silat	Women's tunggal (seni)	14 December
Bronze	Syarief Hidayatullah Suhaimi	Pencak silat	Men's tunggal (seni)	14 December
Bronze	Aqsa Sutan Aswar	Jet skiing	Runabout stock	14 December
Bronze	Elaine Widjaja; Bianca Naomi Amina Laksono; Sania Talita Wahyudi	Golf	Women's team	14 December
Bronze	Adellia	Swimming	Women's 200 m backstroke	14 December
Bronze	Marlando Sihombing; Toni Setiadi; Gebby Adi Wibawa Putra	Billiards and snooker	Men's team billiards	14 December
Bronze	Andi Try Sandi Saputra; Syamsul Akmal; Muhammad Hardiansyah Muliang; Anwar Budiyanto; Muhammad Hafidz; Rusdi; Nofrizal; Muhammad Alhasani; Jelki Ladada; Andi Dwy Andika; Victoria Eka Prasetyo; Yudha Aswinatama	Sepak takraw	Men's team regu	14 December
Bronze	Dita Pratiwi; Kusnelia; Frisca Kharisma Indrasari; Fujy Anggy Lestari; Rikha Khilmiyati; Wan Annisa Rachmadi; Salsa Sabilillah; Cici Herfiyuli; Leni; Laura Dinda Yanatasya; Dona Aulia; Lena	Sepak takraw	Women's team regu	14 December
Bronze	Muhammad Dzaky Firdaus; Mohammad Ega Rahmaditya; Dwiga Meyza Arnandha	Esports	FC Online team	14 December
Bronze	Dhendy Krhistanto; Marlando Sihombing; Gebby Adi Wibawa Putra	Billiards and snooker	Men's team 6 red snooker	15 December
Bronze	Aiman Cahyadi	Cycling	Road - Men's time trial individual	15 December
Bronze	Ajeng Nur Cahaya; Chelsa Berliana Nurtomo; Mediol Stiovanny Yoku; Yolana Betha Pangestika; Megawati Hangestri Pertiwi; Indah Guretno Dwi Margiani; Ersandrina Devega; Geofanny Eka Cahyaningtyas; Naisya Pratama Putri; Rika Dwi Latri; Pascalina Mahuze; Maradanti Namira Tegariana; Sulastri Rahma Aulia; Syelomitha Afrilaviza Injilia Wongkar	Volleyball	Women's team	15 December
Bronze	Felix Viktor Iberle	Swimming	Men's 50 m breaststroke	15 December
Bronze	Odekta Elvina Naibaho	Athletics	Women's 10,000 m	15 December
Bronze	Wahyu Setiawan; Fatah Sidik Jaelani; Bayu Kertanegara; Lalu Muhammad Zohri	Athletics	Men's 4 × 100 m relay	15 December
Bronze	Sharon Adelina Liman Santoso	Bowling	Women's singles	15 December
Bronze	Harry Brahmana	Wushu	Men's sanda 70 kg	15 December
Bronze	Hans Christian Pratama	Practical shooting	Men's standard individual	15 December
Bronze	M Awaludin Ilham	Practical shooting	Men's production optic individual	15 December
Bronze	Sukmawati Abdullah	Practical shooting	Women's production optic individual	15 December
Bronze	Boki Andreas Yunus	Shooting	Men's trap individual	16 December
Bronze	Aditya Bagus Arfan; Gilbert Elroy Tarigan; Satria Duta Cahaya; Azarya Jodi Setyaki; Nayaka Budhidharma	Chess	Men's team ASEAN chess rapid	16 December
Bronze	Rikki Martin Luther Simbolon	Athletics	Men's 10,000 m	16 December
Bronze	Maria Natalia Londa	Athletics	Women's long jump	16 December
Bronze	Enggar Bayu Saputra	Kickboxing	Men's full contact 57 kg	16 December
Bronze	Aprilia Eka Putri L	Kickboxing	Women's K-1 52 kg	16 December
Bronze	Sevi Nurul Aini	Kickboxing	Women's low kick 48 kg	16 December
Bronze	Andi Mesyara Jerni Maswara	Kickboxing	Women's point fighting 50 kg	16 December
Bronze	Muhammad Noval Ashidiq; Al Kautsar; Rashif Amila Yaqin	Triathlon	Men's triathlon team relay	17 December
Bronze	Issa Behuku; Nurtang; Mutiara Rahma Putri; Chelsea Corputty	Rowing	Women's quadruple sculls	17 December
Bronze	Annabella Putri Yohanna	Billiards and snooker	Women's singles snooker	17 December
Bronze	Riau Ega Agata; Ayu Mareta Dyasari	Archery	Mixed team recurve	17 December
Bronze	Ayustina Delia Priatna	Cycling	Road - Women's road race individual	17 December
Bronze	Geraldo; Rafli Fauzan Arafah; Gavin Azarya; Abid Abiyu Cadafi; Satria Jaya Fathurahman; Alias Ilyas; Taufan Abdillah Jabbar; Septa Ami Maulana; Hendro Prasetyo; Saepul Qoirudin; Azka Fauzan Ramdhani; Fachmi Rizki; Wahyu Iman Santosa; Oni Arianus Sir; Dinar Widiyuwono; Muhammad Fadly	Handball	Men's team	17 December
Bronze	Sharon Adelina Liman Santoso; Aldila Indryati	Bowling	Women's doubles	17 December
Bronze	Mohamad Ervan; Novendra Priasmoro	Chess	Men's makruk double standard	17 December
Bronze	Antonius Efrem Tuke Eduk	Pencak silat	Men's class A	17 December
Bronze	Iqbal Chandra Pratama	Pencak silat	Men's class F	17 December
Bronze	Igi Rangga Barani	Pencak silat	Men's class G	17 December
Bronze	Sadan Ahmed Sidik Lisanaka	Pencak silat	Men's class I	17 December
Bronze	Dinda Nuraidha	Pencak silat	Women's class C	17 December
Bronze	Vera Febrianti	Modern pentathlon	Women's laser run individual	17 December
Bronze	Leonardo Prasetyo Agung; Aldhia Fahmi Aranda; Riski; Yonathan Cin; Yehezkiel Wiseman Hamonangan; Christian Widy Wardhana Hartono	Esports	Mobile Legends: Bang Bang - Men's team	17 December
Bronze	Cindy Laurent Siswanto; Venny Lim; Viorelle Valencia Chen; Vivi Indrawaty; Michelle Denise Susanto	Esports	Mobile Legends: Bang Bang - Women's team	17 December
Bronze	Adisty Gracelia Lolaroh	Muaythai	Women's featherweight 57 kg	17 December
Bronze	Junetha Melva Christia	Muaythai	Women's waikru individual	17 December
Bronze	Stevannie Rejune Christia	Muaythai	Women's flyweight 51 kg	17 December
Bronze	Indra Surya Ondeng Hutagalung	Muaythai	Men's light welterweight 63.5 kg	17 December
Bronze	Achmad Fauzi; Raifa Putri Yattaqi	Squash	Mixed jumbo doubles	17 December
Bronze	Achmad Fauzi; Muhammad Rifaa Ramadhan	Squash	Men's jumbo doubles	17 December
Bronze	Janice Tjen	Tennis	Women's singles	18 December
Bronze	Prima Wisnu Wardhana; Nurisa Dian Ashrifah	Archery	Mixed team compound	18 December
Bronze	Ayustina Delia Priatna	Cycling	Track - Women's scratch	18 December
Bronze	Christopher Rungkat; Muhammad Rifqi Fitriadi	Tennis	Men's doubles	18 December
Bronze	Ignatius Anthony Susanto; Lucky Chandra Kurniawan	Tennis	Men's doubles	18 December
Bronze	Sarah Novita	Wrestling	Women's freestyle 50 kg	18 December
Bronze	Kharisma Tantri Herlina	Wrestling	Women's freestyle 62 kg	18 December
Bronze	I Komang Wahyu Brahmasta; I Putu Ngurah Krisna Adipranata; I Made Widi Januarta; Gd Yoga Pratama Artha Bhaskara; Ervin	Kabaddi	Men's three stars	18 December
Bronze	Aby Siliwangi Jaya Kusuma; Muhammad Haidir Ali; Abdullah Kamal Hasibuan; Wira Gunawan; Muhammad Fikry Haikal	Esports	Free Fire team	18 December
Bronze	Ni Kadek Ariani; Fatima Zahrah Albanjari; Ni Luh Wesika Ratna Dewi; Kisi Salisa Kasse; I Dewa Ayu D. A. Laksmi; Sang Ayu Maypriani; Rahmawati Dwi Pangestuti; Lie Qiao; Ni Kadek Fitria Rada Rani; Ni Putu Ayu Nanda Sakarini; Ni Wayan Sariani; Emily Sirs; Ni Made Putri Suwandewi; Maria Corazon K. Wombaki; Desi Wulandari	Cricket	Women's T20	19 December
Bronze	Lea Elvensia Wolobubo Kahol; Adelaide Callista Wongsohardjo; Jesslyn Angelique Aritonang; Angelica Jennifer Candra; Yuni Anggraeni; Dewa Ayu Made Sriartha; Gabriel Sophia; Agustin Elya Gradita Retong; Nathania Claresta Orville; Erinindita Prias Madafa	Basketball	Women's team	19 December
Bronze	Indonesia	Basketball	Men's team	19 December
Bronze	Asrul Alam; Julian Agung Mahendra; Julius Rizhad Rumaropen; Alfandy Aly Surya Prastyo; Ardam; Derangga Raditya; Redy Dwi Lingga; Achmad Fachrizal; Fadli Muhamad; Aulia Akbar Al Ardh; Arthur Blasius Wibowo; Abdullah Jihad Al Akbar; Mochamad Fathur Rochman; Akmal Khaerulloh; Ahmad Fikri Nur Hikmat; Ahdan Asasi Ramadhan Uno; Nurul Maulana Yusuf; Jerry Efendi	Field hockey	Men's team	19 December
Bronze	Aenah Aeliyah Purbaningrum; Febrina Indriasari; Indah Safitri; Jeanette Ayu Puspita; Melyn Cecilia Legawa; Adila Putri Shabirah; Amazia Keyko Radisty; Annisa Nurul Aulia; Bilqis Kautsar Uzmut; Lathifa Hazna Azka Rahayu; Selfia Nur Fitroch; Theresia Putri Argya Wibowo; Thytania Rhamadini Putri	Water polo	Women's team	19 December
Bronze	Gladies Lariesa Garina Haga; Linar Betiliana	Diving	Women's synchronized platform	19 December
Bronze	Indonesia	Indoor hockey	Women's team	19 December
Bronze	Bernard Benyamin Van Aert	Cycling	Track - Men's points race	19 December
Bronze	Arserl Rizki Brayudha	Equestrian	Individual show jumping	19 December
Bronze	M. Fawwaz Aditia Farrel	Shooting	Men's 25 m rapid fire pistol	19 December
Bronze	Izzuddin Afif; Trisnarmanto; Fathur Gustafian	Shooting	Men's 50 m rifle three positions team	19 December
Bronze	Fathur Gustafian	Shooting	Men's 50 m rifle three positions	19 December
Bronze	Zainal Abidin	Wrestling	Men's freestyle 57 kg	19 December
Bronze	Muhammad Rifqi Fitriadi	Tennis	Men's singles	19 December
Bronze	Christopher Rungkat; Aldila Sutjiadi	Tennis	Mixed doubles	19 December
Bronze	Priska Madelyn Nugroho; Anjali Kirana Junarto	Tennis	Mixed doubles	19 December
Bronze	Maria Meisita Manguntu	Boxing	Women's 60 kg	19 December
Bronze	Alfiantika Kartika Manopo	Boxing	Women's 57 kg	19 December
Bronze	Israellah Athena Bonita Saweho	Boxing	Women's 50 kg	19 December
Bronze	Jill Mandagie	Boxing	Men's 57 kg	19 December
Bronze	Mohamad Ervan; Susanto Megaranto; Novendra Priasmoro	Chess	Men's chess double rapid	19 December
Bronze	Jeremia Wihardja	Short-track speed skating	Men's speed skating 500 m	19 December
Bronze	Marva Kayana Putra Firdaus	Short-track speed skating	Men's speed skating 1,500 m	19 December
Bronze	Kierana Alexandra Laut	Short-track speed skating	Women's speed skating 1,500 m	19 December
Bronze	Asuhan Pattiiha	Rowing	Men's solo CM1X	19 December
Bronze	Armuhammad Naufal Junindra	Table tennis	Men's singles	19 December
Bronze	Rusdi; Syamsul Akmal; Jelki Ladada; Muhammad Hardiansyah Muliang; Victoria Eka Prasetyo	Sepak takraw	Men's regu	20 December
Bronze	Leni; Lena; Dona Aulia; Frisca Kharisma Indrasari; Fujy Anggy Lestari	Sepak takraw	Women's regu	20 December

=== Demonstration Sports medalists ===
The following Indonesia competitors won medals at the demonstration events.

Medal	Name	Sport	Event	Date
Gold	Dwi Ani Retno Wulan	Mixed martial arts	Women's traditional -54kg	11 December
Gold	Jafro Megawanto	Air sports	Paragliding - Men's accuracy	13 December
Gold	Susana Dwi Cahyanti	Air sports	Paragliding - Women's accuracy	13 December
Gold	Indonesia	Air sports	Paragliding - Mixed team accuracy	13 December
Silver	Maydelse Sitepu	Mixed martial arts	Women's modern 60kg	11 December
Silver	Alfiandi	Mixed martial arts	Men's modern -60kg	11 December
Silver	Alfian Bagus Fernanda	Mixed martial arts	Men's modern -56kg	11 December
Silver	Vallensia Fahira Hotmauli	Mixed martial arts	Women's modern -54kg	12 December
Bronze	Albert	Mixed martial arts	Men's modern -65kg	11 December

== Competitors ==
The following is the list of the number of competitors participating at the Games per sport/discipline.

Sport	Men	Women	Total
Air sports	6	3	9
Archery	7	7	14
Artistic swimming	—N/a	10	10
Athletics	16	14	30
Badminton	10	10	20
Baseball	24	—N/a	24
Baseball5	4	4	8
Basketball	16	14	30
Beach volleyball	4	4	8
Billiards and snooker	4	2	6
Bowling	4	4	8
Boxing	7	5	12
Canoe	13	8	21
Chess	8	5	13
Cricket	15	15	30
Cycling	13	3	16
Diving	2	2	4
Dragon boat	14	14	28
Esports	19	5	24
Equestrian	9	3	12
Fencing	8	8	16
Field hockey	18	18	36
Figure skating	1	2	3
Flying disc	9	9	18
Football	23	23	46
Gymnastics	3	2	5
Golf	4	3	7
Ice hockey	23	—N/a	23
Jet ski	5	—N/a	5
Judo	6	5	11
Ju-jitsu	3	3	6
Kabaddi	12	12	24
Mixed martial arts	3	3	6
Modern pentathlon	4	4	8
Muaythai	3	3	6
Open water swimming	2	2	4
Pétanque	7	3	10
Polo	8	—N/a	8
Rowing	13	10	23
Rugby sevens	—N/a	13	13
Sailing	3	1	4
Sepak takraw	12	12	24
Short-track speed skating	5	2	7
Shooting	21	22	43
Skateboard	4	4	8
Softball	—N/a	16	16
Sport climbing	9	9	18
Squash	3	1	4
Swimming	13	9	22
Table tennis	5	5	10
Taekwondo	9	4	13
Tennis	5	5	10
Teqball	4	4	8
Triathlon	8	10	18
Tug of war	8	6	14
Volleyball	14	14	28
Water polo	15	13	28
Water skiing and wakeboarding	6	6	12
Weightlifting	6	6	12
Woodball	12	11	23
Wrestling	8	4	12
Wushu	8	6	14
Total	528	425	953

Demonstration sports

== Archery ==
Recurve

Athlete	Event	Qualification Round		Round of 16	Quarterfinal	Semifinal	Final	Rank
Athlete	Event	Score	Seed	Opposition score	Opposition score	Opposition score	Opposition score	Rank
Riau Ega Agatha	Men's individual	672	1	Cruz (TLS); W 6–0	Chatkanjanarak (THA); W 7–1	Duc (VIE); W 7–3	Quik (MAS); W 6(9+)–5(9)	1st place, gold medalist(s)
Arif Dwi Pangestu	Men's individual	663	3	Wong (THA); W 7–1	Busthamin (THA); L 0–6	Did not advance		
Ahmad Khoirul Baasith	Men's individual	660	6	Did not advance				
Alviyanto Prastyadi Bagas	Men's individual	650	11	Did not advance				
Arif Dwi Pangestu; Riau Ega Agatha; Ahmad Khoirul Baasith	Men's team	—N/a			Bye	Thailand (THA); W 5–3	Vietnam (VIE); W 6–0	1st place, gold medalist(s)
Rezza Octavia	Women's individual	649	5	Did not advance				
Diananda Choirunisa	Women's individual	667	2	Cruz (TLS); W 6–0	Tagle (PHI); W 6–0	Loc (VIE); W 7–3	Huyen Diep Trieu (VIE); W 6–4	1st place, gold medalist(s)
Ayu Mareta Dyasari	Women's individual	671	1	Bye	Yeo (SIN); L 5(9)–6(10)	Did not advance		
Fathiyya Erista Maharani	Women's individual	619		Did not advance				
Diananda Choirunisa; Rezza Octavia; Ayu Mareta Dyasari	Women's team	—N/a			Bye	Thailand (THA); W 6–0	Malaysia (MAS); W 5–3	1st place, gold medalist(s)
Riau Ega Agatha; Ayu Mareta Dyasari	Mixed Team	—N/a			Laos (LAO); W 6–0	Singapore (SIN); L 3–5	Vietnam (VIE); W 6–2	3rd place, bronze medalist(s)

Compound

Athlete	Event	Qualification Round		Round of 16	Quarterfinal	Semifinal	Final	Rank
Athlete	Event	Score	Seed	Opposition score	Opposition score	Opposition score	Opposition score	Rank
M Ryan Hidayat	Men's individual	698	3	Rain (MYA); W 144–143	Kohkaew (THA); L 145–146	Did not advance		
Sostar Andaru Rinaldi	Men's individual	697	4	Aung Ko (MYA); W 149–138	Dang (VIE); W 148–145	Mazuki (MAS); L 142–145	Kohkaew (THA); L 138–142	4
Prima Wisnu Wardhana	Men's individual	695	5	Did not advance				
Prima Wardhana Wisnu; M Ryan Hidayat; Sostar Andaru Rinaldi	Men's team	1995	1	—N/a	Myanmar (MYA); W 233–223	Malaysia (MAS); L 229–233	Vietnam (VIE); L 227–232	4
Nina Bonita Pereira Yurike	Women's individual	697	2	Kamkeo (LAO); L 140–143	Did not advance			
Nurisa Dian Ashrifah	Women's individual	694	3	Hlaing (MYA); W 146–143	Chau (VIE); W 146–141	Ng (MAS); W 145–143	Ong (SIN); W 142–140	1st place, gold medalist(s)
Ratih Zilzati Fadhly	Women's individual	678	6	Did not advance				
Nina Bonita Pereira Yurike; Nurisa Dian Ashrifah; Ratih Zilzati Fadhly	Women's team	1995	1	—N/a	Bye	Vietnam (VIE); L 227–224	Singapore (SIN); W 228–227	1st place, gold medalist(s)
Prima Wardhana Wisnu; Nurisa Dian Ashrifah	Mixed Team	—N/a			Laos (LAO); W 40–35	Vietnam (VIE); L 152–152(19)	Singapore (SIN); W 153–150	3rd place, bronze medalist(s)

== Artistic swimming ==
Athlete	Event	Final				
Athlete	Event	Free	Technical	Champ	Total	Rank
Hilda Tri Julyandra; Talitha Amabelle Putri Subeni	Women's Duet	159.2171	199.6792	—N/a	358.8963	3rd place, bronze medalist(s)
Rasya Annisa Rahman; Mutiara Nur Azisah; Amandha Mutiara Putri	Women's Duet	156.1979	195.7450	—N/a	351.9429	4
Rani Asriani Rahman; Rasya Annisa Rahman; Nawrah Qanitah Zhafirah; Auliya Mustika Putri; Khansa Fathiyyah Zahrani Saman; Mutiara Nur Azisah; Nurfa Nurul Utami; Amandha Mutiara Putri	Women's Team	156.0892	156.6416	439.2231	—N/a	3rd place, bronze medalist(s)

== Athletics ==
Key

- Note–Ranks given for track events are within the athlete's heat only
- Q = Qualified for the next round
- q = Qualified for the next round as a fastest loser or, in field events, by position without achieving the qualifying target
- NR = National record
- GR = SEA Games record
- N/A = Round not applicable for the event
- Bye = Athlete not required to compete in round

=== Men's ===
Track and road events

Athlete	Event	Heats			Final	
Athlete	Event	Heat	Time	Rank	Time	Rank
Lalu Muhammad Zohri	100m	2	10.19	2 Q	10.25	2nd place, silver medalist(s)
Bayu Ketanegara	100m	1	10.54	4	Did not advance	
Wahyudi Putra	800m		1:53.92	2 Q	1:56.33	8
Wahyudi Putra	1500m	—N/a			3:49.03	2nd place, silver medalist(s)
Rikki Marthin Luther Simbolon	10000m	—N/a			29:54.64	3rd place, bronze medalist(s)
Robi Syianturi	10000m	—N/a			31:03.34	5
Pandu Sukarya	3000m steeplechase	—N/a			8:57.13	2nd place, silver medalist(s)
Fatah Sidik Jaelani; Bayu Kertanegara; Wahyu Setiawan; Lalu Muhammad Zohri	4 × 100m relay	—N/a			39.51	3rd place, bronze medalist(s)

Field events

Athlete	Event	Final	
Athlete	Event	Distance	Position
Rafael	High jump	2.04	8
Sapwaturrahman	Long jump	7.18	9
Sapwaturrahman	Triple jump	15.84	7
Idan Fauzan Richsan	Pole vault	5.00	4
Abd Hafiz	Javelin throw	72.82	1st place, gold medalist(s)
Silfanus Ndiken	Javelin throw	71.99	2nd place, silver medalist(s)
Rikki Marthin Luther Simbolon	Marathon	DNS	—
Robi Syianturi	Marathon	2:27:33	1st place, gold medalist(s)
Hendro Yap	20km walk	1:35:25	1st place, gold medalist(s)

Athlete	Event	100m	LJ	SP	HJ	400 m	110m H	DT	PV	JV	1500m	Total	Rank
Idan Fauzan Richsan	Decathlon	728; 11.62	668; 6.23	516; 9.90	610; 1.78	667; 53.34	839; 15.09	504; 31.99	1004; 5.30	492; 43.46	554; 5:01.07	6582 pts	3rd place, bronze medalist(s)

=== Women's ===
Track and road events

Athlete	Event	Heats			Final	
Athlete	Event	Heat	Time	Rank	Time	Rank
Devi Aprilian	100 m	1	DNS	—	Did not advance	
Dina Aulia	100 m	2	DNS	—	Did not advance	
Dina Aulia	100 m hurdles	—N/a			13.21	1st place, gold medalist(s)
Emilia Nova	100 m hurdles	—N/a			13.27	2nd place, silver medalist(s)
Diva Aprilian	200 m		24.38	7	DSQ	—
Elvina Naihabo Odekta	5000 m	—N/a			DNS	—
Elvina Naihabo Odekta	10000 m	—N/a			35:33.23	3rd place, bronze medalist(s)
Elvina Naihabo Odekta	Marathon	—N/a			2:43:13	1st place, gold medalist(s)
Violine Intan Puspita	20 km walk	—N/a			1:46:52	1st place, gold medalist(s)
Halida Ulfah	20 km walk	—N/a			1:48:58	4

Field events

Athlete	Event	Final	
Athlete	Event	Distance	Rank
Diva Renatta Jayadi	Pole vault	4.35 m GR, NR	1st place, gold medalist(s)
Maria Andriani Melabessy	Pole vault	3.90 m	3rd place, bronze medalist(s)
Maria Natalia Londa	Long jump	6.27 +0.9	3rd place, bronze medalist(s)
Maria Natalia Londa	Triple jump	13.85 m	1st place, gold medalist(s)
Eki Febri Ekawati	Shot put	13.94 m	4
Atinna Nurkamila Intan Bahtiar	Javelin throw	51.06 m	4

Athlete	Event	100m H	HJ	SP	200 m	LJ	JT	800m	Total	Rank
Emilia Nova	Heptathlon	13.61; 1034	1.67; 818	11.41; 622	25.14; 874	5.83; 798	38.74; 643	2:28.78; 708	5,497 pts	1st place, gold medalist(s)

== Badminton ==
Badminton Association of Indonesia sent 20 athletes to compete in the 2025 SEA Games consisting of 10 male athletes and 10 female athletes.

Men

Athlete	Event	First round	Quarterfinal	Semifinal	Final	Rank
Athlete	Event	Opposition Score	Opposition Score	Opposition Score	Opposition Score	Rank
Zaki Ubaidillah	Singles	Lê Đ P (VIE); W (17–21, 21–9, 21–19)	Loh K Y (SGP); W (21–19, 21–10)	Leong J H (MAS); W (21–18, 21–13)	A Farhan (INA); L (21–13, 8–21, 12–21)	2nd place, silver medalist(s)
Alwi Farhan	Singles	Nguyễn H Đ (VIE); W (21–17, 21–15)	Clarence V (PHI); W (21–18, 21–14)	Justin H (MAS); W (21–10, 15–21, 21–14)	Z Ubaidillah (INA); W (13–21, 21–8, 21–12)	1st place, gold medalist(s)
Leo Rolly Carnando; Bagas Maulana	Doubles	Hein T A / Phone H Z (MYA); W (21–4, 21–7)	Wesley K / Junsuke K (SGP); W (21–17, 21–19)	A Chia / Soh W Y (MAS); L (10–21, 12–21)	Did not advance	3rd place, bronze medalist(s)
Sabar Karyaman Gutama; Muhammad Reza Pahlevi Isfahani	Doubles	Phyo T K / L Zuidika (MYA); W (21–11, 21–10)	Solomon J P / Julius V (PHI); W (21–11, 21–17)	Man W C / Tee K W (MAS); W (21–16, 21–17)	A Chia / Soh W Y (MAS); W (21–14, 21–17)	1st place, gold medalist(s)
Alwi Farhan; Zaki Ubaidillah; Yohanes Saut Marcellyno; Prahdiska Bagas Shujiwo; Leo Rolly Carnando; Bagas Maulana; Sabar Karyaman Gutama; Muhammad Reza Pahlevi Isfahani; Jafar Hidayatullah; Amri Syahnawi	Team	—N/a	Bye	Singapore (SGP); W 3–1	Malaysia (MAS); W 3–0	1st place, gold medalist(s)

Women

Athlete	Event	First round	Quarterfinal	Semifinal	Final	Rank
Athlete	Event	Opposition Score	Opposition Score	Opposition Score	Opposition Score	Rank
Putri Kusuma Wardani	Singles	Bye	Letshanaa K (MAS); W (21–18, 21–13)	Supanida K (THA); L (18–21, 16–21)	Did not advance	3rd place, bronze medalist(s)
Ni Kadek Dhinda Amartya Pratiwi	Singles	Nguyễn T L (VIE); W (16–21, 22–20, 21–14)	Wong L C (MAS); L (11–21, 17–21)	Did not advance		
Rachel Allessya Rose; Febi Setianingrum	Doubles	L Z Hong / L Z Yan (SGP); W (21–11, 21–11)	Thi Dieu Ly / Khành (VIE); W (19–21, 21–13, 21–14)	Pearly T / Thinaah M (MAS); L (14–21, 21–19, 16–21)	Did not advance	3rd place, bronze medalist(s)
Febriana Dwipuji Kusuma; Meilysa Trias Puspita Sari	Doubles	I Khan / Y Megan (SGP); W (21–10, 21–9)	Teoh M X / Go P K (MAS); W (21–15, 21–12)	Bui B P / Vu Thi T (VIE); W (21–10, 21–9)	Pearly T / Thinaah M (MAS); L (16–21, 21–19, 17–21)	2nd place, silver medalist(s)
Putri Kusuma Wardani; Gregoria Mariska Tunjung; Mutiara Ayu Puspitasari; Ni Kadek Dhinda Amartya Pratiwi; Febriana Dwipuji Kusuma; Meilysa Trias Puspita Sari; Rachel Allessya Rose; Febi Setianingrum; Felisha Alberta Nathaniel Pasaribu; Nita Violina Marwah	Team	—N/a	Myanmar (MYA); W 3–0	Malaysia (MAS); W 3–2	Thailand (THA); L 1–3	2nd place, silver medalist(s)

Mixed

Player	Event	First round	Quarter-finals	Semi-finals	Final	Rank
Player	Event	Opponent Score	Opponent Score	Opponent Score	Opponent Score	Rank
Amri Syahnawi; Nita Violina Marwah	Mixed	Terry H / Jin Y (SGP); L (18–21, 14–21)	Did not advance			
Jafar Hidayatullah; Felisha Pasaribu	Mixed	E K Wesley / Li Z Y (SGP); W (19–21, 21–8, 21–19)	H Htut / T H Thuzar (MYA); W (21–8, 21–5)	Dechapol P / Supissara P (THA); L (17–21, 15–21)	Did not advance	3rd place, bronze medalist(s)

== Basketball ==
Summary

Team	Event	Preliminary Round				Quarter-finals	Semifinals	Final / BM	
Team	Event	Opposition Score	Opposition Score	Opposition Score	Rank	Opposition Score	Opposition Score	Opposition Score	Rank
Indonesia men's	Men's 3x3	Thailand; L 17–20	Myanmar; W 21–13	Singapore; L 18–20	3	—N/a	Did not advance		
Indonesia women's	Women's 3x3	Philippines; W 21–15	Malaysia; W 19–10	—N/a	1 Q	—N/a	Vietnam; W 20–18	Thailand; W 20–18	1st place, gold medalist(s)
Indonesia men's	Men's 5x5	Myanmar; W 114–35	Thailand; L 67–71	Singapore; W 87–48	2 q	Vietnam; W 89–66	Philippines; L 68–71	Malaysia; W 80–68	3rd place, bronze medalist(s)
Indonesia women's	Women's 5x5	Vietnam; W 81–38	Thailand; L 55–60	—N/a	2 q	Singapore; W 77–37	Philippines; L 55–65	Malaysia; W 62–55	3rd place, bronze medalist(s)

Rosters

Men 5x5

Indonesia national basketball team - 2025 SEA Games roster
Players
Coaches

Pos.	No.	Name	Age – Date of birth	Height	Club	Ctr.
G		Abraham Damar Grahita	27 – October 8, 1998	1.80 m (5 ft 11 in)	Satria Muda Bandung	(Indonesia)
G		Yudha Saputera	27 – October 21, 1998	1.75 m (5 ft 9 in)	Satria Muda Bandung	(Indonesia)
G		Rio Disi	33 – December 4, 1992	1.85 m (6 ft 1 in)	Dewa United Banten	(Indonesia)
F		Julian Chalias	23 – August 12, 2002	2.00 m (6 ft 7 in)	Satria Muda Bandung	(Indonesia)
F/C		Derrick Michael Xzavierro	22 – April 1, 2003	2.08 m (6 ft 10 in)	Long Beach State Beach	(United States)
F		Neo Putu Pande	24 – February 5, 2001	1.96 m (6 ft 5 in)	Pelita Jaya Bakrie	(Indonesia)
G		Hendrick Xavi Yonga	23 – August 7, 2002	1.84 m (6 ft 0 in)	Pelita Jaya Bakrie	(Indonesia)
G		Andakara Prastawa	33 – August 16, 1992	1.73 m (5 ft 8 in)	Pelita Jaya Bakrie	(Indonesia)
G		Agassi Goantara	26 – October 17, 1999	1.88 m (6 ft 2 in)	Pelita Jaya Bakrie	(Indonesia)
F		Dame Diagne	20 – July 29, 2005	1.98 m (6 ft 6 in)	Satria Muda Bandung	(Indonesia)
G/F		Patrick Nikolas	27 – September 2, 1998	1.88 m (6 ft 2 in)	Dewa United Banten	(Indonesia)
F/C		Ponsianus Nyoman Indrawan	40 – August 13, 1985	1.96 m (6 ft 5 in)	Kesatria Bengawan Solo	(Indonesia)

Head coach

- (United States) David Singleton

Assistant coach(es)

- (Indonesia) Andri Malay
- (Indonesia) Ismael Tan
- (Indonesia) Nico Donnda

Women's 5x5

Indonesia women's national basketball team - 2025 SEA Games roster roster
Players
Coaches

Pos.	No.	Name	Age – Date of birth	Height	Club	Ctr.
PG	2	Agustin Retong	29 – 24 August 1995	1.67 m (5 ft 6 in)	Surabaya Fever	(Indonesia)
PF	9	Dewa Ayu Kusuma	26 – 20 November 1998	1.76 m (5 ft 9 in)	GMC Cirebon	(Indonesia)
SF	11	Faizzatus Shoimah	24 – 13 December 2000	1.75 m (5 ft 9 in)	GMC Cirebon	(Indonesia)
C		Gabriel Sophia	33 – 21 November 1991	1.72 m (5 ft 8 in)	Surabaya Fever	(Indonesia)
PG	12	Adelaide Wongsohardjo	23 – 12 October 2001	1.73 m (5 ft 8 in)	GMC Cirebon	(Indonesia)
PF	13	Yuni Anggraeni	31 – 28 June 1994	1.75 m (5 ft 9 in)	Sahabat Semarang	(Indonesia)
SF	14	Jesslyn Aritonang	22 – 18 July 2002	1.70 m (5 ft 7 in)	Surabaya Fever	(Indonesia)
SG	21	Nathania Orville	24 – 3 August 2000	1.76 m (5 ft 9 in)	Surabaya Fever	(Indonesia)
C		Lea Kahol	25 – 17 July 1999	1.78 m (5 ft 10 in)	Surabaya Fever	(Indonesia)
PF		Erinindita Madafa	19 – 19 November 2005	2.00 m (6 ft 7 in)		(Indonesia)
SG	71	Clarita Antonio	26 – 1 July 1999	1.78 m (5 ft 10 in)	Surabaya Fever	(Indonesia)

Head coach

- (Indonesia) Andrie Santosa

Assistant coach(es)

- (Indonesia) Marlina Herawan

3x3

Men	Women
Surliyadin; M Sandy Ibrahim Aziz; Nickson Damara Gosal; Reggie William Mononimbar	Evelyn Fiyo; Dewa Ayu M. S. Kusuma Dewi; Agustin Elya Gradita Retong; Kimberley Pierre-Louis

== Billiards and snooker ==
=== Billiards ===
Athlete	Event	Quarterfinals	Semifinals	Final	
Athlete	Event	Opposition Result	Opposition Result	Opposition Result	Rank
Toni Setiadi	Men's Single	Pakpoj (THA); L 0–3	Did not advance		
Marlando Sihombing	Men's Single	Gilchrist (SGP); L 0–3	Did not advance		
Toni Setiadi; Marlando Sihombing; Gebby Adi Wibawa Putra	Men's Team	—N/a	Myanmar; L 2–3	Did not advance	3rd place, bronze medalist(s)

=== Snooker ===
Athlete	Event	Round of 16	Quarterfinals	Semifinals	Final	
Athlete	Event	Opposition Result	Opposition Result	Opposition Result	Opposition Result	Rank
Dhendy Krhistanto	Men's 6-red Singles	Mengorio (PHI); L 4–5	Did not advance			
Gebby Adi Wibawa Putra	Men's 6-red Singles	Tun (MYA); L 3–5	Did not advance			
Annabella Putri Yohana	Women's 6-red Singles	Siripaporn (THA); L 1–3	Did not advance			
Emilia Putri Rahmanda	Women's 6-red Singles	Bye	Nutcharut (THA); L 0–3	Did not advance		
Dhendy Krhistanto; Marlando Sihombing; Gebby Adi Wibawa Putra	Men's 6-red Team	—N/a	Thailand; W 4–3	Philippines; L 2–4	Did not advance	3rd place, bronze medalist(s)
Annabella Putri Yohana; Emilia Putri Rahmanda Sihombing	Women's 6-red Team	—N/a	Bye	Singapore; W 3–0	Thailand; L 2–3	2nd place, silver medalist(s)
Dhendy Krhistanto	Men's Singles	Phyo (MYA); L 0–4	Did not advance			
Gebby Adi Wibawa Putra	Men's Singles	Phone (MYA); L 1–4	Did not advance			
Annabella Putri Yohana	Women's Singles	Bye	Inthavong (LAO); W 3–1	Wongharuthai (THA); L 0–3	Did not advance	3rd place, bronze medalist(s)
Emilia Putri Rahmanda Sihombing	Women's Singles	Channoi (THA); L 0–3	Did not advance			
Dhendy Krhistanto; Marlando Sihombing; Gebby Adi Wibawa Putra	Men's Team	—N/a	Myanmar; L 0–3	Did not advance		
Annabella Putri Yohana; Emilia Putri Rahmanda Sihombing	Women's Team	—N/a	Bye	Laos; W 3–0	Thailand; L 0–3	2nd place, silver medalist(s)

== Baseball ==
Team	Event	Group Stage							Final / BM	
Team	Event	Opposition Score	Opposition Score	Opposition Score	Opposition Score	Opposition Score	Opposition Score	Rank	Opposition Score	Rank
Indonesia	Men's tournament	Malaysia; W 10–0	Philippines; L 0–14	Thailand; L 1–10	Laos; W 4–3	Vietnam; W 19–3	Singapore; W 15–4	3 q	Singapore; W 10–9	3rd place, bronze medalist(s)
Indonesia	Baseball5	Malaysia; W 10–8	Vietnam; W 21–0	Thailand; L 3–21	—N/a			2 Q	Thailand; L 10–13	2nd place, silver medalist(s)

Squads

Indonesia

Ranjani
Akbar Kurniawan
Diva Reza Fabil
Yana Gerhana
Muhammad Ikbal
Muhammad Vendy Kurniawan
Nazrey Lazuardi
Aditya Muflih Mahmud
Hadi Nur Muhammad
Narendra Bismo Nugroho
Aditya Aulia Rachman
Rizki Ramadhan

Rizki Jodiansyah Ramadhan
Teuku Muhammad Emille Rasya
Rawafi Yaputra Yanto Rozali
Ray Theodore Santoso
Nanda Dwi Saputra
Andrew Putra Soetyono
I Gede Ricky Takahashi Suasta
Rui Takahashi
I Gusti Lanang Agung Trianjana
Alexander Rudolf Wibowo
Muhammad Arrifqi Zavianda
Faldy Akhmad Zulfikar

Baseball5
- Males
  Jaya Gustiar
  Rafael Mcguire Richardo
  Bachtiar Sanjaya
  Muhammad Mahsa Wildanur
- Females
  Nicole Astrella Hermanto
  Maria Maggiore Judith
  Kadek Sinta Dwi Maharani
  Rahmah Delima Putri

== Bowling ==
Team	Event	Preliminary Round		Quarterfinals	Semifinals	Final	
Team	Event	Score	Rank	Opposition Score	Opposition Score	Opposition Score	Rank
Billy Muhammad Islam	Men's Singles	1205	12	Did not advance			
Yeri Ramadona	Men's Singles	1192	15	Did not advance			
Hardy Rachmadian	Men's Singles	1180	16	Did not advance			
Ryan Leonard Lalisang	Men's Singles	1117	20	Did not advance			
Aldila Indryati	Women's Singles	1104	19	Did not advance			
Putty Insavilla Armein	Women's Singles	1179	13	Did not advance			
Alisha Nabila Larasati	Women's Singles	1233	7 Q	Roslan (MAS); L 176–182	Did not advance		
Sharon Adelina Liman Santoso	Women's Singles	158	6 Q	Redzwan (MAS); W 212–183	Roslan (MAS); L 207–214	Did not advance	3rd place, bronze medalist(s)
Billy Muhammad Islam; Yeri Ramadona	Men's Doubles	2511	7 Q	Malaysia; L 399–407	Did not advance		
Hardy Rachmadian; Ryan Leonard Lalisang	Men's Doubles	2351	10	Did not advance			
Aldila Indryati; Sharon Adelina Liman Santoso	Women's Doubles		8 Q	Singapore; W 425–379	Indonesia; L 353–388	Did not advance	3rd place, bronze medalist(s)
Putty Insavilla Armein; Alisha Nabila Larasati	Women's Doubles		4 Q	Philippines; W 373–364	Indonesia; W 388–353	Singapore; L 353–379	2nd place, silver medalist(s)

== Boxing ==
Athlete	Event	Quarterfinals	Semifinals	Final	
Athlete	Event	Opposition Result	Opposition Result	Opposition Result	Rank
Dio Koebanu	Men's Light flyweight	Phlongaurai (THA); L 0–5	Did not advance		
Vicky Tahumil Junior	Men's Flyweight	Ariffin (MAS); W 3–2	Cường (VIE); W 5–0	Panmod (THA) W 3–2	1st place, gold medalist(s)
Flanuari Yerikho Daud	Men's Bantamweight	Jara (PHI); L 2–3	Did not advance		
Jill Mandagie	Men's Featherweight	Ko Ko (MYA); W 5–0	Nguyễn (VIE); L 1–4	Did not advance	3rd place, bronze medalist(s)
Asri Udin	Men's Lightweight	Johari (MAS); W 5–0	Mhal (MYA); W RSC R2	Ruantham (THA); L 0–5	2nd place, silver medalist(s)
Jerki Riwu	Men's Welterweight	Fajardo (PHI); L RSC R1	Did not advance		
Maikhel Roberrd Muskita	Men's Light heavyweight	Bye	Yomkhot (THA); W 4–1	Marcial (PHI); L 1–4	2nd place, silver medalist(s)
Merlin Tomatala	Women's Light flyweight	Magno (PHI); L 1–4	Did not advance		
Israellah Athena Bonita Saweho	Women's Flyweight	Bye	Raksat (THA); L 1–4	Did not advance	3rd place, bronze medalist(s)
Nabila Maharani	Women's Bantamweight	Bye	Nwe (MYA); W 5–0	Chongprongklang (THA); L 1–4	2nd place, silver medalist(s)
Alfianita Kartika Manopo	Women's Featherweight	—N/a	Ruenros (THA); L 0–5	Did not advance	3rd place, bronze medalist(s)
Manguntu Maria Meisita	Women's Lightweight	Bye	Linh (VIE); L 0–5	Did not advance	3rd place, bronze medalist(s)
Huswatun Hasanah	Women's Light welterweight	—N/a	Petecio (PHI); W 3–2	Somnuek (THA); L 0–4	2nd place, silver medalist(s)

== Canoeing ==
Men

Athlete	Event	Preliminary		Final	
Athlete	Event	Result	Rank	Result	Rank
Muh Burhan	Canoe single 500 m	2:15.366	2 Q	2:06.332	5
Sofiyanto; Evans Monim	Canoe double 200 m	40.589	2 Q	39.688	3rd place, bronze medalist(s)
Sofiyanto; Roby Kuswandi; Evans Monim; Muh Burhan; Rudiansyah	Canoe four 200 m	37.664	3 Q	35.134	3rd place, bronze medalist(s)
Ade Yoan Sutatnto	Canoe single slalom	—N/a		100.09	2nd place, silver medalist(s)
Mugi Harjito; Abdul Hamid	Kayak double 200 m	34.471	2 Q	34.332	2nd place, silver medalist(s)
Subhi; Wandi; Evans Monim; Abdul Hamid; Mugi Harjito; Indra Hidayar; Dede Sunandar	Kayak four 200 m	32.317	2 Q	31.822	3rd place, bronze medalist(s)
Septiana Krisna	Kayak single slalom	—N/a		85.70	2nd place, silver medalist(s)

Women

Athlete	Event	Preliminary		Final	
Athlete	Event	Result	Rank	Result	Rank
Sella Monim; Herlin Aprilin Lali	Canoe double 200 m	44.978	2 Q	43.457	3rd place, bronze medalist(s)
Sella Monim; Herlin Aprilin Lali	Canoe double 500 m	2:18.327	2 Q	2:16.410	3rd place, bronze medalist(s)
Dwi Rachma Febryanti	Canoe single slalom	—N/a		120.04	5
Putu Santhi	Canoe single slalom	—N/a		101.89	2nd place, silver medalist(s)
Sovia Angrum	Kayak single slalom	—N/a		119.76	5
Kadek Sintha	Kayak single slalom	—N/a		104.08	3rd place, bronze medalist(s)

Mixed

Athlete	Event	Preliminary		Final	
Athlete	Event	Result	Rank	Result	Rank
Subhi; Stevani Maysche Ibo	Kayak double 200 m	37.747	1 Q	36.409	1st place, gold medalist(s)
Abdul Hamid; Ramla Baharuddin	Kayak double 500 m	1:41.725	1 Q	1:50.985	3rd place, bronze medalist(s)
Subhi; Abdul Hamid; Ramla Baharuddin; Stevani Maysche Ibo	Kayak four 500 m	1:54.430	1 Q	1:37.916	1st place, gold medalist(s)

== Chess ==
Athlete	Event	Preliminary Round			Semifinal	Final	
Athlete	Event	Score	Score	Rank	Opposition Score	Opposition Score	Rank
Aditya Bagas Arfan; Gilbert Elroy Taringan; Satria Duta Cahaya; Azarya Jodi Setyaki; Nayama Budidharma	ASEAN chess team men rapid	9.5	—N/a	4 Q	Thailand; L 1.5–2.5	Did not advance	3rd place, bronze medalist(s)
Mohamad Ervan; Susanto Megaranto; Novendra Priasmoro	Chess double men rapid	5	—N/a	4 Q	Malaysia; L 2.5–3.5	Did not advance	3rd place, bronze medalist(s)
Mohamad Ervan; Susanto Megaranto; Novendra Priasmoro; Nayaka Budhidharma	Makruk team men triple Blitz	18	—N/a	2 Q	Philippines; W 5–4	Thailand; L 1.5–4.5	2nd place, silver medalist(s)
Medina Warda Aulia; Irine Kharisma Sukandar; Dewi Ardhiani Anastasia	ASEAN chess team women rapid	15	—N/a	1 Q	Philippines; W 4.5–3.5	Vietnam; W 2.5–1.5	1st place, gold medalist(s)
Medina Warda Aulia; Irine Kharisma Sukandar; Dewi Ardhiani Anastasia Citra; Laysa Latifah	Chess double women rapid	6	—N/a	2 Q	Philippines; W 2.5–1.5	Vietnam; L 0.5–1.5	2nd place, silver medalist(s)
Mohamad Evran; Susanto Megaranto; Novendea Priasmoro; Medina Warda Aulia	Mixed Makruk Chess Standard Team	5.5	11.5	5 Q	Vietnam; L 1.5–3.5	Did not advance	3rd place, bronze medalist(s)

== Cricket ==
The Indonesian Cricket Association sent both men's and women's team, a total of 30 athletes consisting of 15 males and 15 females each.

Team	Event	Round Robin / Group Stage					Semifinal	Final / BM	
Team	Event	Opposition Score	Opposition Score	Opposition Score	Opposition Score	Rank	Opposition Score	Opposition Score	Rank
Men's	T10	Thailand; W 71/3–70/7; 7 wickets	Singapore; L 61/8–78/8; 17 runs	Philippines; L 93/7–104/8; 11 runs	Malaysia; L 61/8–65/3; 7 wickets	4	—N/a		4
Men's	T20	Thailand; W 81/5–80/9; 5 wickets	Malaysia; L 75/9–78/3; 7 wickets	Philippines; L 104–182/5; 78 runs	Singapore; L 151/9–155/7; 3 wickets	4	—N/a		4
Women's	T10	Thailand; L 45/7–46/1; 9 wickets	Singapore; W 79/3–31/5; 48 runs	—N/a		2 Q	Myanmar; W 61/6–44/10; 17 runs	Thailand; L 40/6–41/1; 9 wickets	2nd place, silver medalist(s)
Women's	T20	Malaysia; L 110/9–128/7; 18 runs	Philippines; W 196/5–56/8; 140 runs	—N/a		2 Q	Thailand; L 70–144/8; 74 runs	Myanmar; W 63/5–61; 5 wickets	3rd place, bronze medalist(s)

Squads

Men	Women
Gede Darma Arta; I Ketut Edi Guna Artawan; Ferdinando Banunaek; Dewa Gede Diatmika; Julang Dzulfikar; I Kadek Gamantika; Andreas Alexander Hawoe; Danilson Johanis Hawoe (c); Kadek Dharma Kesuma (wk); Rojerio Maxi Koda; Gede Agus Priandana; Apriliandy Abdillah Rahayu; Ahmad Ramdoni (wk); Muhammad Anjar Tadarus; I Gede Teguh P. Wiguna	Ni Kadek Ariani; Fatima Zahrah Albanjari (wk); Ni Luh Wesika Ratna Dewi; Kisi Salisa Kasse; I Dewa Ayu D. A. Laksmi; Sang Ayu Maypriani; Rahmawati Dwi Pangestuti; Lie Qiao; Ni Kadek Fitria Rada Rani; Ni Putu Ayu Nanda Sakarini; Ni Wayan Sariani; Emily Sirs; Ni Made Putri Suwandewi; Maria Corazon K. Wombaki (wk); Desi Wulandari

== Cycling ==
BMX

Athlete	Event	Final				
Athlete	Event	Moto1	Moto2	Moto3	Time	Rank
Rio Akbar	BMX Time Trial	—N/a			37.395	4
Rio Akbar	BMX Racing	37.278	38.288	37.107	—N/a	4

Mountain biking

Athlete	Event	Preliminary		Final	
Athlete	Event	Time	Rank	Time	Rank
Rendy Varera Sanjaya	Men's elimination	47.835	7		1st place, gold medalist(s)
Rendy Varera Sanjaya	Men's downhill	—N/a		02:38.714	2nd place, silver medalist(s)
Riska Amelia Agustina	Women's downhill	—N/a		03:04.874	2nd place, silver medalist(s)
Milatul Khoqimah	Women's downhill	—N/a		03:42.624	6

Track

Athlete	Event	Final	
Athlete	Event	Time	Rank
Bernard Benyamin Van Aert	Men's Points Race	11	3rd place, bronze medalist(s)
Muhammad Andy Royan	Men's Points Race	–4	5
Bernard Benyamin Van Aert; Muhammad Andy Royan; Julian Abi Manyu; Terry Yudha Kusuma; Yosandy Darmawan Oetomo	Men's Team Pursuit	DSQ	—N/a
Terry Yudha Kusuma; Yosandy Darmawan Oetomo; Dika Alif Dhentaka	Men's Team Sprint	—N/a	
Ayustina Delia Priatna	Women's Scratch	—	3rd place, bronze medalist(s)

Road

Athlete	Event	Final	
Athlete	Event	Time	Rank
Aiman Cahyadi	Men's Individual Time Trial	1:08:18	3rd place, bronze medalist(s)
Muhammad Abdurrohman	Men's Individual Time Trial	1:14:08	10
Muhammad Abdurrohman	Men's Individual Road Race	4:18:39	19
Aiman Cahyadi	Men's Individual Road Race	4:13.44	6
Muhammad Syelhan Nurrahmat	Men's Individual Road Race	4:13.05	2nd place, silver medalist(s)
Aiman Cahyadi; Muhammad Raihan Maulidan; Muhammad Andy Royan; Muhammad Syelhan Nurrahmat; Maulana Astnan Al Hayat	Men's Team Time Trial	1:13:27	1st place, gold medalist(s)
Aiman Cahyadi; Muhammad Syelhan Nurrahmat; Maulana Astnan Al Hayat; Muhammad Raihan Maulidan; Muhammad Abdurrohman	Men's Team Road Race	12:42:48	2nd place, silver medalist(s)
Ayustina Delia Priatna	Women's Individual Time Trial	0:59:18	1st place, gold medalist(s)
Ayustina Delia Priatna	Women's Individual Road Race		

== Diving ==
Athlete	Event	Final	
Athlete	Event	Points	Rank
Andriyan	Men's 1m springboard	289.55	6
Andriyan	Men's 3m springboard	308.45	7
Muhamad Yudha Prastiyo	Men's 1m springboard	249.95	8
Muhamad Yudha Prastiyo	Men's 3m springboard	273.35	9
Andriyan; Muhamad Yudha Prastiyo	Men's synchronised 3m springboard	293.97	4
Gladies Lariesa Garina; Linar Betiliana	Women's synchronised platform	211.74	3rd place, bronze medalist(s)

== Dragon boat ==
Team	Event	Final			
Team	Event	Round 1	Round 2	Total	Rank
Indonesia	Men's Small Boat 200 m	00:46.504	00:46.374	01:32.878	1st place, gold medalist(s)
Indonesia	Men's Small Boat 500 m	02:00.347	02:02.943	04:03.290	1st place, gold medalist(s)
Indonesia	Women's Small Boat 200 m	00:52.303	00:52.605	01:44.908	2nd place, silver medalist(s)
Indonesia	Women's Small Boat 500 m	02:14.784	02:16.338	04:31.086	2nd place, silver medalist(s)
Indonesia	Mixed Standard Boat 200 m	00:43.383	00:42.706	01:26.089	1st place, gold medalist(s)
Indonesia	Mixed Standard Boat 500 m	01:51.256	01:52.826	03:44.082	1st place, gold medalist(s)

Squads

Men	Women
Angga Suwandi Putra; Dapit; Dedi Kusmayadi; Ikballana Ikhsan; Indra Tri Setiawan; Irwan; Masrino; Mugi Harjito; Nana Maulana Saepudin; Riyan Prasetio; Sahrul Gunawan; Sutrisno; Yadi; Yuda Firmansyah	Adila Desvi Rahayu; Dayumin; Devita Safitri; Handayani; Maryati; Nadia Hafiza; Nur Meni; Nurevani Feraliana; Ramla Baharuddin; Ratih; Reski Wahyuni; Ririn Puji Astuti; Riska Andriyani; Sri Kandi

== Esports ==
=== Mobile Legends: Bang Bang ===
Athlete	Event	Group stage					Quarterfinals	Semifinal	Final / BM	
Athlete	Event	Opposition Score	Opposition Score	Opposition Score	Opposition Score	Rank	Opposition Score	Opposition Score	Opposition Score	Rank
Leonardo Prasetyo Agung; Aldhia Fahmi Aranda; Riski; Yonathan Cin; Yehezkiel Wiseman Hamonangan; Christian Widy Wardhana Hartono	Men's Team	Philippines; L 0–2	Singapore; W 2–0	Laos; W 2–0	Malaysia; L 0–2	3 Q	Vietnam; W 3–1	Philippines; L 1–3	Myanmar; W 3–1	3rd place, bronze medalist(s)
Cindy Laurent Siswanto; Venny Lim; Viorelle Valencia Chen; Vivi Indrawaty; Michelle Denise Susanto	Women's Team	Timor-Leste; W 2–0	Myanmar; W 2–0	Malaysia; L 0–2	—N/a	2 Q	Laos; W 3–0	Philippines; L 1–3	Myanmar; W 3–0	3rd place, bronze medalist(s)

=== FC Online ===
Team	Event	Preliminary round			Quarterfinal	Semifinal	Final	
Team	Event	Opposition Score	Opposition Score	Rank	Opposition Score	Opposition Score	Opposition Score	Rank
Muhammad Dzaky Firdaus; Mohammad Ega Rahmaditya; Dwiga Meyza Arnandha	Mixed EA Sports FC Online	Vietnam; W 3–1	Myanmar; W 3–0	1 Q	Thailand; L 3–2	Vietnam; L 1–3	Did not advance	3rd place, bronze medalist(s)

=== Free Fire ===
Team	Event	Booyah!	Eliminations Points	Placement Points	Final	
Team	Event	Booyah!	Eliminations Points	Placement Points	Total	Rank
Indonesia (1)	Free Fire	0	47	51	98	3rd place, bronze medalist(s)
Indonesia (2)	Free Fire	0	77	38	115	2nd place, silver medalist(s)

Players

Indonesia (1)	Indonesia (2)
Aby Siliwangi Jaya Kusuma; Muhammad Haidir Ali; Abdullah Kamal Hasibuan; Wira Gunawan; Muhammad Fikry Haikal	Rafli Aidil Fitrah; Muh Raehan; Adrian; Adam Ramdani; Kahfi Alfathan

== Equestrian ==
Athlete	Event	Preliminary		Final	
Athlete	Event	Round 1	Round 2	Score	Rank
Karen Leticia Herjawan	Mixed Individual Dressage	69.353	65.294	Did not advance	
Dara Ninggar Prameswari	Mixed Individual Dressage	68.529	68.147	70.285	4
Audirania Amanda Putri	Mixed Individual Dressage	68.059	66.706	Did not advance	
Alfaro Menayang	Mixed Individual Dressage	69.324	67.412	69.750	5
Alfaro Menayang; Audirania Amanda Putri; Dara Ninggar Prameswari; Karen Leticia Herjawan	Mixed Team Dressage	—N/a		207.206	2nd place, silver medalist(s)
Steven Menayang	Mixed Individual Eventing	—N/a		31.6	3rd place, bronze medalist(s)
Welda Agapindo	Mixed Individual Eventing	—N/a		37.1	7
Riko Ganda Febryanto	Mixed Individual Eventing	—N/a		49.9	11
Steven Menayang; Riko Ganda Febryanto; Welda Agapindo; Jamhur Hatta	Mixed Team Eventing	—N/a		118.6	2nd place, silver medalist(s)
Brayen Nathan Brata Coolen	Mixed Individual Jumping	77.53	65.57	105.67	1st place, gold medalist(s)
Arserl Rizki Brayudha	Mixed Individual Jumping	84.63	71.54	112.29	3rd place, bronze medalist(s)
Raymen Kaunang	Mixed Individual Jumping	85.50	69.20	Did not advance	
Dirga Wira Ramadhan Saputra	Mixed Individual Jumping	81.39	70.16	Did not advance	
Brayen Nathan Brata Coolen; Arserl Rizki Brayudha; Raymen Kaunang; Dirga Wira Ramadhan Saputra	Mixed Team Jumping	—N/a		107.01	1st place, gold medalist(s)

== Football ==
Indonesia will compete in both men's and women's football.

Team	Event	Group Stage			Semifinal	Final / BM	
Team	Event	Opposition Score	Opposition Score	Rank	Opposition Score	Opposition Score	Rank
Indonesia men's	Men's tournament	Philippines; L 0–1	Myanmar; W 3–1	2	Did not advance		5
Indonesia women's	Women's tournament	Thailand; L 0–8	Singapore; W 3–1	2 Q	Vietnam; L 0–5	Thailand; L 0–2	4

=== Men's tournament ===
Team roster

Indonesia announced their final squad on 27 November 2025. On 3 December 2025, Marselino Ferdinan withdrew due to an injury and replaced by Rifqi Ray.

Head coach: Indra Sjafri

No.	Pos.	Player	Date of birth (age)	Caps	Goals	Club
1	GK	Cahya Supriadi	11 February 2003 (aged 22)	6	0	(Football Association of Indonesia) PSIM Yogyakarta
2	DF	Muhammad Ferarri	21 June 2003 (aged 22)	23	2	(Football Association of Indonesia) Bhayangkara Presisi Lampung
3	DF	Kakang Rudianto	22 August 2003 (aged 22)	10	0	(Football Association of Indonesia) Persib Bandung
4	DF	Kadek Arel	4 April 2005 (aged 20)	18	0	(Football Association of Indonesia) Bali United
5	MF	Ivar Jenner (captain)	10 January 2004 (aged 21)	12	2	(Royal Dutch Football Association) Utrecht
6	DF	Robi Darwis	2 August 2003 (aged 22)	17	0	(Football Association of Indonesia) Persib Bandung
7	MF	Zanadin Fariz	31 May 2004 (aged 21)	4	1	(Football Association of Indonesia) Persis Solo
8	MF	Rayhan Hannan	2 April 2004 (aged 21)	13	2	(Football Association of Indonesia) Persija Jakarta
9	FW	Mauro Zijlstra	9 November 2004 (aged 21)	2	1	(Royal Dutch Football Association) Volendam
10	FW	Rafael Struick	27 March 2003 (aged 22)	15	5	(Football Association of Indonesia) Dewa United Banten
11	FW	Hokky Caraka	21 August 2004 (aged 21)	15	1	(Football Association of Indonesia) Persita Tangerang
12	MF	Ananda Raehan	17 December 2003 (aged 21)	14	0	(Football Association of Indonesia) PSM Makassar
13	MF	Rifqi Ray	22 June 2004 (aged 21)	1	0	(Football Association of Indonesia) Persik Kediri
14	MF	Rivaldo Pakpahan	20 January 2003 (aged 22)	4	0	(Football Association of Indonesia) Borneo Samarinda
15	DF	Raka Cahyana	24 February 2004 (aged 21)	4	0	(Football Association of Indonesia) PSIM Yogyakarta
16	DF	Dony Tri Pamungkas	11 January 2005 (aged 20)	17	2	(Football Association of Indonesia) Persija Jakarta
17	FW	Rahmat Arjuna	30 April 2004 (aged 21)	10	0	(Football Association of Indonesia) Bali United
18	MF	Toni Firmansyah	14 January 2005 (aged 20)	9	0	(Football Association of Indonesia) Persebaya Surabaya
19	DF	Dion Markx	29 June 2005 (aged 20)	4	0	(Royal Dutch Football Association) TOP Oss
20	DF	Frengky Missa	20 February 2004 (aged 21)	14	0	(Football Association of Indonesia) Bhayangkara Presisi Lampung
21	FW	Jens Raven	12 October 2005 (aged 20)	11	7	(Football Association of Indonesia) Bali United
22	GK	Daffa Fasya	7 May 2004 (aged 21)	2	0	(Football Association of Indonesia) Borneo Samarinda
23	GK	Muhammad Ardiansyah	23 March 2003 (aged 22)	5	0	(Football Association of Indonesia) PSM Makassar

Group play

Pos	Team	Pld	W	D	L	GF	GA	GD	Pts	Qualification
1	Philippines	2	2	0	0	3	0	+3	6	Advance to knockout stage
2	Indonesia	2	1	0	1	3	2	+1	3	
3	Myanmar	2	0	0	2	1	5	−4	0	

Source: Soccerway
Rules for classification: Group stage tiebreakers
8 December 2025
18:00

Philippines	1–0	Indonesia
Banatao 45+2'	Report

700th Anniversary Stadium, Chiang Mai
Referee: Adel Al-Naqbi (United Arab Emirates)
12 December 2025
18:00

Indonesia	3–1	Myanmar
Toni 45'; Raven 89', 90+5'	Report	Min Maw Oo 29'

700th Anniversary Stadium, Chiang Mai
Referee: Ammar Mahfoodh (Bahrain)

=== Women's tournament ===
Team roster

Head coach: (Japan) Akira Higashiyama

Indonesia announced their final squad on 2 December 2025.

No.	Pos.	Player	Date of birth (age)	Caps	Goals	Club
1	GK	Iris de Rouw	21 April 2005 (age 21)	4	0	(United States Soccer Federation) St. John's Red Storm
23	GK	Alleana Ayu Arumy	26 February 2010 (age 16)	1	0	(Football Association of Indonesia) Asprov DKI Jakarta
21	GK	Shesilia Desrina	7 December 2007 (age 18)	0	0	(Football Association of Indonesia) Persib Bandung
13	DF	Safira Ika	21 April 2003 (aged 22)	43	1	(Football Association of Indonesia) Asprov DKI Jakarta
17	DF	Vivi Oktavia (captain)	7 March 1997 (aged 28)	36	2	(Football Association of Indonesia) Asprov Bangka Belitung
12	DF	Zahra Muzdalifah	4 April 2001 (aged 24)	33	4	(Football Association of Indonesia) Asprov DKI Jakarta
2	DF	Remini Rumbewas	9 October 2000 (aged 25)	17	1	(Football Association of Indonesia) Toli
5	DF	Gea Yumanda	27 June 2006 (aged 19)	15	1	(Football Association of Indonesia) Asprov Jabar
4	DF	Emily Nahon	17 May 2007 (aged 18)	5	0	(United States Soccer Federation) Little Rock Trojans
3	DF	Jazlyn Kayla	26 August 2010 (aged 15)	0	0	(Football Association of Indonesia) Asprov DKI Jakarta
15	MF	Helsya Maeisyaroh	7 May 2005 (aged 20)	29	2	(Football Association of Indonesia) Asprov Jabar
19	MF	Viny Silfianus	3 July 2002 (aged 23)	23	0	(Football Association of Malaysia) Kelana United
16	MF	Rosdilah Nurrohmah	3 October 1999 (aged 26)	18	1	(Football Association of Indonesia) Raga Negeri
8	MF	Reva Octaviani	8 October 2003 (aged 22)	23	5	(Football Association of Indonesia) Asprov Jabar
7	MF	Felicia de Zeeuw	19 January 2006 (aged 19)	4	0	(Royal Dutch Football Association) ADO Den Haag
6	MF	Nafeeza Nori	11 March 2011 (aged 14)	0	0	(Football Association of Indonesia) Asprov Jabar
9	FW	Claudia Scheunemann	24 April 2009 (aged 16)	19	6	(Royal Dutch Football Association) Utrecht
14	FW	Isa Warps	6 March 2005 (aged 20)	7	1	(German Football Association) VfR Warbeyen
18	FW	Marsela Awi	10 May 2003 (aged 22)	24	4	(Football Association of Indonesia) Toli
10	FW	Sheva Imut	20 April 2004 (aged 21)	23	2	(Football Association of Indonesia) Asprov DKI Jakarta
20	FW	Ajeng Sri Handayani	13 December 2006 (aged 18)	2	0	(Football Association of Indonesia) Persib Bandung
22	FW	Aulia Mabruroh	25 January 2005 (aged 20)	3	1	(Football Association of Indonesia) Asprov Lampung
11	FW	Ayunda Dwi Anggraini	15 January 2006 (aged 19)	1	0	(Football Association of Indonesia) Asprov Jatim

Group play

Pos	Team	Pld	W	D	L	GF	GA	GD	Pts	Qualification
1	Thailand (H)	2	2	0	0	10	0	+10	6	Advance to knockout stage
2	Indonesia	2	1	0	1	3	9	−6	3	Advance to knockout stage
3	Singapore	2	0	0	2	1	5	−4	0	
4	Cambodia	0	0	0	0	0	0	0	0	Withdrew

Source: Soccerway
(H) Hosts
4 December 2025
18:30

Thailand	8–0	Indonesia
Yumanda 8' (o.g.); Pattaranan 21'; Silawan 27'; Saowalak 44'; Jiraporn 50' (pen.), 52' (pen.), 60'; Panitha 55'	Report

Chonburi Stadium, Chonburi
Referee: Azusa Sugino (Japan)
7 December 2025
16:00

Singapore	1–3	Indonesia
Ruhaizat 22'	Report	Warps 31'; Scheunemann 62'; Aulia 90+5'

IPE Chonburi Stadium, Chonburi
Referee: Esra'a Almbaidin (Jordan)

== Ice skating ==
=== Figure skating ===
Athlete	Event	Preliminary		Final	
Athlete	Event	Score	Rank	Score	Rank
Rafif Herfianto Putra	Men's Single	36.83	6 Q	114.02	6
Chilly Ann Sintana Wongso	Women's Single	36.17	6 Q	102.74	6
Safia Nurdeta Aulia Andiko	Women's Single	35.96	7 Q	92.93	7

=== Short-track speed skating ===
Athlete	Event	Preliminary		Final	
Athlete	Event	Time	Rank	Time	Rank
Jeremia Wihardja	Men's Speed Skating 500m	44.298	3	43.314	3rd place, bronze medalist(s)
Marva Kayana Putra Firdaus	Men's Speed Skating 1500m	2:33.536	4	2:26.931	3rd place, bronze medalist(s)
Kayshan Azri Putra Firdaus	Men's Speed Skating 1500m	2:33.946	6		7
Marva Kayana Putra Firdaus; Kayshan Azri Putra Firdaus; Arsa Mizan Putra Firdaus; Jeremia Wihardja; Steavanus Wihardja; Radika Rais Ananda	Men's Speed Skating Open Relay 5000m	—N/a		7:21.890	2nd place, silver medalist(s)
Dhinda Salsabila	Women's Speed Skating 500m	46.297	2	46.297	2nd place, silver medalist(s)
Kierana Alexandra Laut	Women's Speed Skating 500m	48.155	6	48.155	6
Kierana Alexandra Laut	Women's Speed Skating 1500m	2:55.732	5	2:49.966	3rd place, bronze medalist(s)
Dhinda Salsabila	Women's Speed Skating 1500m	2:49.496	2	2:50.126	4

== Futsal ==
Team	Event	Group Stage					Semifinal	Final / BM	
Team	Event	Opposition Score	Opposition Score	Opposition Score	Opposition Score	Rank	Opposition Score	Opposition Score	Rank
Indonesia men's	Men's tournament	Myanmar; W 5–1	Vietnam; L 0–1	Malaysia; W 2–1	Thailand; W 6–1	1	—N/a		1st place, gold medalist(s)
Indonesia women's	Women's tournament	Vietnam; L 1–3	Myanmar; W 4–0	—N/a		2 Q	Thailand; W 4–4 (7–6) (p)	Vietnam; L 0–5	2nd place, silver medalist(s)

== Golf ==
Athlete	Event	Round 1	Round 2	Round 3	Round 4	Total	
Athlete	Event	Score	Score	Score	Score	Score	Rank
Randy Arbenata Mohamad Bintang	Men's Individual	76	70	65	70	281	4
Rayhan Abdul Latief	Men's Individual	73	66	72	76	287	8
Amadeus Christian Susanto	Men's Individual	71	69	73	75	288	8
Kenneth Henson Sutianto	Men's Individual	75	72	72	73	292	11
Amadeus Christian Susanto; Kenneth Henson Sutianto; Rayhan Abdul Latief	Men's Team	219	205	209	218	851	2nd place, silver medalist(s)
Elaine Widjaja	Women's Individual	75	79	72	70	296	5
Bianca Naomi Amina Laksono	Women's Individual	80	82	79	72	313	16
Sania Talita Wahyudi	Women's Individual	76	75	76	76	303	9
Elaine Widjaja; Bianca Naomi Amina Laksono; Sania Talita Wahyudi	Women's Team	151	154	148	142	595	3rd place, bronze medalist(s)

== Gymnastics ==
Athlete	Event	Preliminary		Final	
Athlete	Event	Score	Rank	Score	Rank
Abiyurafi	Men's Floor	12.967	3 Q	12.267	4
Satria Tri Wira Yudha	Men's Floor	12.900	—	Did not advance	
Satria Tri Wira Yudha	Men's Vault	12.500	—	Did not advance	
Muhammad Aprizal	Men's Vault	12.950	3 Q	13.017	4
Muhammad Aprizal	Men's Rings	12.600	2 Q	12.900	2nd place, silver medalist(s)
Satria Tri Wira Yudha	Men's Parallel Bars	10.867	6 Q	12.633	2nd place, silver medalist(s)
Abiyurafi	Men's Horizontal Bar	10.933	6 Q	13.400	1st place, gold medalist(s)
Alarice Mallica Prakoso	Women's Floor	12.000	—	Did not advance	
Salsabilla Hadi Pamungkas	Women's Floor	12.150	5 Q	12.367	3rd place, bronze medalist(s)
Salsabilla Hadi Pamungkas	Women's Vault	12.625	4 Q	12.533	4
Salsabilla Hadi Pamungkas	Women's Balance Beam	9.550	10	Did not advance	
Alarice Mallica Prakoso	Women's Balance Beam	12.300	3 Q	11.667	5

== Handball ==
Team	Event	Preliminary round						Semifinal	Final / BM	
Team	Event	Opposition Score	Opposition Score	Opposition Score	Opposition Score	Opposition Score	Rank	Opposition Score	Opposition Score	Rank
Indonesia	Men's tournament	Singapore; L 19–26	Thailand; L 22–34	Malaysia; W 27–21	Philippines; W 27–26	Vietnam; L 17–28	4 Q	Thailand; L 32–35	Did not advance	3rd place, bronze medalist(s)

Squad

Indonesia

- Geraldo
- Rafli Fauzan Arafah
- Gavin Azarya
- Abid Abiyu Cadafi
- Satria Jaya Fathurahman
- Alias Ilyas
- Taufan Abdillah Jabbar
- Septa Ami Maulana
- Hendro Prasetyo
- Saepul Qoirudin
- Azka Fauzan Ramdhani
- Fachmi Rizki
- Wahyu Iman Santosa
- Oni Arianus Sir
- Dinar Widiyuwono
- Muhammad Fadly

== Hockey ==
=== Field hockey ===
Team	Event	Preliminary round					Semifinal	Final	
Team	Event	Opposition Score	Opposition Score	Opposition Score	Opposition Score	Rank	Opposition Score	Opposition Score	Rank
Indonesia	Men's Tournament	Thailand; L 0–4	Malaysia; L 2–6	Myanmar; W 8–1	Singapore; D 0–0	3 Q	Thailand; L 1–1; 3–4^{SO}	Did not advance	3rd place, bronze medalist(s)
Indonesia	Women's Tournament	Thailand; L 2–3	Malaysia; L 1–11	Singapore; W 4–0	—N/a	3 Q	Thailand; W 0–0; 2–0^{SO}	Malaysia; L 0–6	2nd place, silver medalist(s)

Key:

- SO – Match decided by Shoot-Out.

=== Hockey5s ===
Team	Event	Preliminary round				Semifinal	Final	
Team	Event	Opposition Score	Opposition Score	Opposition Score	Rank	Opposition Score	Opposition Score	Rank
Indonesia men's	Men's tournament	Malaysia; L 2–4	Thailand; L 1–4	Philippines; W 15–0	3 Q	Thailand; W 8–3	Malaysia; L 3–7	2nd place, silver medalist(s)
Indonesia women's	Women's tournament	Malaysia; L 3–5	Thailand; L 2–6	Philippines; W 7–0	3 Q	Thailand; L 2–7	Did not advance	3rd place, bronze medalist(s)

Squads

Men	Women
Ardam; Asrul Alam; Achmad Fachrizal; Ahmad Firki Nur Hikmat; Fadli Muhamad; Alfandy Aly Surya Prastyo; Mochamad Fathur Rochman; Julius Rizhad Rumaropen; Ahdan Asasi Ramadhan Uno; Nurul Maulana Yusuf	Lispa; Innes Aditya; Selly Amalia Florentina; Nisa Indira; Erika Engelika Kbarek; Salma Maulani; Natasya Naiborhu; Asri Dewi Prasasti; Sri Rahayu; Tiarma Sirait

=== Indoor hockey ===
Team	Event	Preliminary round					Semifinal	Final	
Team	Event	Opposition Score	Opposition Score	Opposition Score	Opposition Score	Rank	Opposition Score	Opposition Score	Rank
Indonesia	Men's Tournament	Singapore; W 10–0	Malaysia; L 4–5	Thailand; W 6–2	Philippines; W 17–0	2 Q	Thailand; W 6–3	Malaysia; W 4–4; 2–0^{SO}	1st place, gold medalist(s)
Indonesia	Women's Tournament	Philippines; W 7–0	Singapore; W 6–1	Thailand; D 2–2	Malaysia; L 0–3	4 Q	Malaysia; L 0–2	Did not advance	3rd place, bronze medalist(s)

Key:

- SO – Match decided by Shoot-Out.

=== Ice hockey ===
The Indonesia Ice Hockey Federation send 23 male athletes to participate in the ice hockey men's tournament.

Team	Event	Preliminary round					Semifinal	Final	
Team	Event	Opposition Score	Opposition Score	Opposition Score	Opposition Score	Rank	Opposition Score	Opposition Score	Rank
Indonesia	Men's tournament	Singapore; W 6–1	Philippines; W 5–1	Thailand; W 3–2 OT	Malaysia; W 10–4	1 Q	Singapore; W 8–3	Thailand; W 3–2	1st place, gold medalist(s)

Squad

Indonesia

Faigan Alghani
Muchammad Athalaa Alqaeda
M. Abyan Putra Arlan
Daffa Abyan Bagaskara
Daffa Fadilla
Raihan Jufino Hafiz
Haykal Kaykobad Hasyim
Arthur Jordan
Adel Khabibullin
Artem Bezrukov
Evgueni Nourislamov
Savelii Molchanov
M. Arsky Jayden Zen Naga

Jonathan Ryan Ferry Nugraha
Jeremiah Ong Praptasuganda
Rizqi Akira Rachman Prijanto
Sangga Munggaran Putra
Izzan Labib Rais
Lucas Nathaniel Valiant Salomo
Anryan Saputra
Ammar Rafandra Saputro
Aditia Sutanto
Ronald Wijaya

== Jet Skiing ==
Athlete	Event	Final					
Athlete	Event	Round 1	Round 2	Round 3	Round 4	Total	Rank
Aero Sutan Aswar	Mixed Endurance Open	380	400	352	—N/a	1132	1st place, gold medalist(s)
Aqsa Sutan Aswar	Mixed Endurance Open	368	360	360	—N/a	1088	4
Raja Jabbar Al Ghaniy	Mixed Runabout 1100 Stock	36	DQM	48	39	123	7
Deepta Fadhillah Nurfaizi	Mixed Runabout 1100 Stock	33	DQM	33	33	99	8
Aero Sutan Aswar	Mixed Runabout Limited	48	43	39	43	173	4
Aqsa Sutan Aswar	Mixed Runabout Stock	48	53	53	48	202	3rd place, bronze medalist(s)
Deepta Fadhillah Nurfaizi	Mixed Runabout Stock	36	43	48	43	170	4
Mohammad Fadlan Usman	Mixed Ski 1500 Stock	39	DSQ	—	—	—	—
Mohammad Fadlan Usman	Mixed Ski GP	43	DSQ	—	—	—	—

== Judo ==
Combat

Athlete	Event	Quarterfinals	Semifinals/Repechage	Final/BM	
Athlete	Event	Opposition Score	Opposition Score	Opposition Score	Rank
Muhammad Rizqi Maulana	Men's -55 kg	Aimin (MAS); W	Somchay (LAO); W	Thanh (VIE); W	1st place, gold medalist(s)
Dewa Kadek Rama Warma Putra	Men's -73 kg	Xaisengxeun (LAO); W	Masayuki (THA); L	Aung (MYA); W	3rd place, bronze medalist(s)
Diki Hartato	Men's -81 kg	Dong (VIE); W	Daniel (MAS); L	Hern (SIN); L	4
I Made Sastra Dharma	Men's -90 kg	Sayasan Soulisay (LAO); W	Zarchie (PHI); W	Wei (THA); W	1st place, gold medalist(s)
Gede Ganding Kalbu Soethama	Men's -100 kg	Phyo (MYA); W	Henric (SIN); W	Chino (PHI); L	2nd place, silver medalist(s)
Dinny Febriany	Women's -57 kg	Bye	Zaw (MYA); W	Joemari- Heart (PHI); W	1st place, gold medalist(s)
Syerina	Women's -70 kg	Yuxuan (SIN); W	Zuraida (MAS); W	Vi (VIE); W	1st place, gold medalist(s)
Tika Syafitri	Women's -78 kg	Bye	Aung (MYA); L	Quynh (VIE); L	4
Indah Permatasari	Women's +78 kg	Lattana (LAO); W	Thanh (VIE); W	Thonthan (THA); L	2nd place, silver medalist(s)
	Mixed Team	Philippines (PHI); L	Laos (LAO); W	Vietnam (VIE); L	4

== Ju-jitsu ==
Fighting

Athlete	Event	Round of 16	Quarterfinals	Semifinals	Repechage A	Repechage B	Final / BM	
Athlete	Event	Opposition Result	Opposition Result	Opposition Result	Opposition Result	Opposition Result	Opposition Result	Rank
Artz Brilliant Perfecto	Men's Fighting -77 kg	Bye	Elijah P C (PHI); W 13–7	S J Tan Jedd (SIN); L 6–11	—N/a	Bye	Jedidiah P S (LAO); W 0–0	3rd place, bronze medalist(s)
Steefanny Kinky Henandhita	Women's Fighting -52 kg	Bye	Nutchaya S (THA); W 10–8	mui N P (VIE); L 8–14	Bye	—N/a	Binte Roslan A S (SIN); W 0–0	3rd place, bronze medalist(s)

Ne-waza

Athlete	Event	Round of 16	Quarterfinals	Semifinals	Final / BM	
Athlete	Event	Opposition Result	Opposition Result	Opposition Result	Opposition Result	Rank
Willy	Men's Ne-waza -69 kg	William C O (CAM); W DNS	Xavier B Y (PHI); L 0–0	Did not advance		
Muhamad Nurul Fikri	Men's Ne-waza -85 kg	Bye	Matthew N S (SIN); W 0–0	Roxas D M (PHI); L 0–50	Did not advance	
Putri Arba Nazwah Dzakira	Women's Ne-waza -48 kg	Bye	Kimberly A C (PHI); L 0–50	Did not advance		
Megawati Ilma Yeni	Women's Ne-waza -63 kg	Mitra A A (PHI); W 50–0	Vu T A (VIE); L 2–2	Did not advance		

== Kabaddi ==
Team	Event	Preliminary round						Final	
Team	Event	Opposition Score	Opposition Score	Opposition Score	Opposition Score	Opposition Score	Rank	Opposition Score	Rank
Indonesia	Men's Standard Style	Singapore; W 61–21	Thailand; L 20–49	Timor-Leste; W 92–14	Myanmar; W 70–28	Malaysia; W 49–24	2 Q	Thailand; L 23–31	2nd place, silver medalist(s)
Indonesia	Men's Super Five	Timor-Leste; W 35–9	Myanmar; W 32–16	Thailand; L 15–30	Malaysia; W 33–29	Singapore; W 28–14	2 Q	Thailand; L 24–31	2nd place, silver medalist(s)
Indonesia	Men's Three Stars	Timor-Leste; W 45–11	Myanmar; W 34–19	Malaysia; L 19–27	Singapore; W 32–19	Thailand; L 21–31	3	Did not advance	3rd place, bronze medalist(s)
Indonesia	Women's Standard Style	Singapore; W 51–5	Malaysia; W 28–27	Timor-Leste; W WO	Thailand; L 27–45	—N/a	2 Q	Thailand; L 31–34	2nd place, silver medalist(s)
Indonesia	Women's Super Five	Malaysia; W 31–19	Timor-Leste; W WO	Singapore; W 32–5	Thailand; L 21–29	—N/a			2nd place, silver medalist(s)
Indonesia	Women's Three Stars	Malaysia; L 22–23	Timor-Leste; W WO	Thailand; W 25–17	Singapore; W 35–3	—N/a	2 Q	Malaysia; W 24–23	1st place, gold medalist(s)

Squads

Men	Women
Muhammad Iriansyah; I Gusti Agung Eka Wibawa Dana; I Made Dwiki Sanjaya; I Komang Wahyu Brahmasta; I Gede Jaya Guna; I Putu Ngurah Krisna Adipranata; I Putu Darma Indrawan; I Made Suastika; I Made Widi Januarta; Gd Yoga Pratama Artha Bhaskara; Ervin; David Rinekso Pribadi	Ni Komang Trisna Arkasari; Ni Komang Tri Meiyoni; Made Dhyani Pramestya Dewi; Yuni Amirta Nadila; Ni Made Dwiyani Putri; Ni Luh Happy Restia Dewi; Ni Komang Pebriyanti; Ni Putu Nadine Aristya Dewi; Oktavia Riska Della; Dewa Ayu Sri Wahyuni; Ni Kadek Ari Wartini; Ni Putu Alya Virda Yanti

== Karate ==
Kumite

Athlete	Event	Round of 16	Quarterfinals	Semifinals/Repechage	Final/BM	
Athlete	Event	Opposition Score	Opposition Score	Opposition Score	Opposition Score	Rank
Nur Halim Arlendi	Men's –67 kg	Bye	Manantan (PHI); L 4–4*	Did not advance		
Ignatius Joshua Kandou	Men's –75 kg	—N/a	Quefi (TLS); W 7–1	Batican (PHI); W 6–2	Vo (VIE); W 9–3	1st place, gold medalist(s)
Arif Fadhillah	Men's –84 kg	—N/a		Khensulintha (LAO); W 8–0	Truong (VIE); L 1–4	2nd place, silver medalist(s)
Daniel	Men's +84 kg	—N/a				2nd place, silver medalist(s)
Cok Istri Agung Sanistyarani	Women's –55 kg	Chokprasertgul (THA); W 6–1	Ly (VIE); L 1–7	Robert (MAS); L 5–6	Did not advance	4
Ni Made Dwi Kartika	Women's –61 kg	Bye	Poovanesan (MAS); W 14–5	Butsuwan (THA); L 4–5	Zar (MYA); W 6–4	3rd place, bronze medalist(s)
Ceyco Georgia Zefanya	Women's –68 kg	—N/a	Zakiah (MAS); W 7–3	Sonthong (THA); W 5–4	Dinh (VIE); L 5–8	2nd place, silver medalist(s)
Leica Al Humaira Lubis	Women's +68 kg				Souphaphone (LAO); W 2–0	1st place, gold medalist(s)
Nur Halim Arlendi; Ignasius Joshua Kondou; Arif Fadhillah; Daniel; Muhammad Tegar Januar; I Komang Astawa Setiabudi	Men's Kumite Team	—N/a	Laos (LAO); W 3–0	Malaysia (MAS); W 3–1	Thailand (THA); L 6–8	2nd place, silver medalist(s)
Ni Made Dwi Kartika Aprianti; Nurmala Erlyawati; Cok Istri Agung Sanistyarani; Ceyco Georgia Zefanya	Women's Kumite Team	—N/a	Philippines (PHI); W 2–0	Thailand (THA); L 6–9	Laos (LAO); W –	3rd place, bronze medalist(s)

Kata

Athlete	Event	
Athlete	Event	Rank
Christopher Edbert Setiabudi; Agvyan Rizky Pradana; Detrina Sabda Nugraha	Men's kata team	4
Emilia Sri Hanandyta; Dian Monika Nababan; Beatrix Helena Pangemanan	Women's kata team	3rd place, bronze medalist(s)

== Kickboxing ==
Athlete	Event	Quarterfinals	Semifinals	Final	
Athlete	Event	Opposition Score	Opposition Score	Opposition Score	Rank
Enggar Bayu Saputra	Men's Ring: Full Contact 57 kg	Yawanophat (LAO); W 3–0	Yawanophat (THA); L 0–3	Did not advance	3rd place, bronze medalist(s)
Riyan Jefri Hamonangan Lumbanbatu	Men's Ring: K–1 60 kg	Siew (MAS); W VOP	Balangui (PHI); W 3–0	Jakkrit Kongtook (THA); W 2–1	1st place, gold medalist(s)
Toni Kristian Hutapea	Men's Ring: Low Kick 51 kg	Pareja (PHI); L 0–3	Did not advance		
Abdul Aziz	Men's Tatami: Kick Light 57 kg	Bayawon (PHI); L 0–3	Did not advance		
Ariyanta Sitepu	Men's Tatami: Point Fighting 63 kg	Villamer (PHI); W 13–3	Vijayakumar (MAS); W 10–8	Sukyik (THA); L 7–14	1st place, gold medalist(s)
Aprilia Eka Putri	Women's Ring: K–1 52 kg	Bye	Thazin (MYA); L 0–3	Did not advance	3rd place, bronze medalist(s)
Sevi Nurul Aini	Women's Ring: Low Kick 48 kg	Bye	Jantakarn Manoban (THA); L 0–3	Did not advance	3rd place, bronze medalist(s)
Andi Mesyara Jerni Maswara	Women's Tatami: Point Fighting 50 kg	Bye	Hoang (VIE); L 8–11	Did not advance	3rd place, bronze medalist(s)

== Muaythai ==
Combat

Athlete	Event	Quarterfinals	Semifinals	Final	
Athlete	Event	Opposition Score	Opposition Score	Opposition Score	Rank
Galih Bangkit Permadi	Men's Light flyweight	Phetrak (THA); L WP30	Did not advance		
Indra Surya Ondeng Hutagulung	Men's Light welterweight	Texas (MAS); W WP29	Pham (VIE); L WP30	Did not advance	3rd place, bronze medalist(s)
Stevannie Rejune Christia	Women's Flyweight	Chan (MYA); W RSCS10	Aonok (THA); L RSCH0	Did not advance	3rd place, bronze medalist(s)
Adisty Gracelia Lolaroh	Women's Featherweight	Bye	Nguyen (VIE); L WP30	Did not advance	3rd place, bronze medalist(s)

Waikru

Athlete	Event	Preliminary Round			Final	
Athlete	Event	Score	Score	Rank	Total Score	Rank
Aldento Brilian Bara Pramata	Men's waikru	9.10	9.10	2		2nd place, silver medalist(s)
Junetha Melva Christia	Women's waikru	9.03	9.00	4		3rd place, bronze medalist(s)

== Open water swimming ==
Athlete	Event	Time	Rank
Mochammad Akbar Putra Taufik	Men's 10km OWS	02:12:51	7
Alexander Adrian	Men's 10km OWS	02:15:56	9
Izzy Dwifaiva Hefrisyanthi	Women's 10km OWS	02:16:01	6
Gusti Ayu Made Nadya Saraswati	Women's 10km OWS	02:20:51	8
Mochammad Akbar Putra Taufik; Alexander Adrian; Gusti Ayu Made Nadya Saraswati; Izzy Dwifaiva Hefrisyanthi	Mixed Relay	01:21:33	4

== Pencak silat ==
=== Seni ===
Athlete	Event	Round of 16	Quarterfinal	Semifinal	Final	
Athlete	Event	Opposition Score	Opposition Score	Opposition Score	Opposition Score	Rank
Syarief Hidayatullah Suhaimi	Men's tunggal	S M Suhaimi (BRU); W 9.935–9.895	B A Rahman (SIN); W 9.955–9.935	Singsouvong (LAO); L 9.935–9.940	Did not advance	3rd place, bronze medalist(s)
Andika Dhanireksa; Asep Yuldan Sani; Rano Slamet Nugraha	Men's regu	—N/a	M H Abdullah / M S Ibrahi / S Yuga (MAS); W 9.960–9.930	Cheni / Koolee / Wani (THA); W 9.960–9.940	Zakri / Kamal / Isa (SIN); W 9.965–9.935	1st place, gold medalist(s)
Puspa Arumsari	Women's tunggal	Bye	Leechort (THA); W 9.945–9.940	Hamzah (THA); L 9.930– 9.955	Did not advance	3rd place, bronze medalist(s)

=== Tanding ===
Men

Athlete	Event	Quarterfinal	Semifinal	Final	
Athlete	Event	Opposition Score	Opposition Score	Opposition Score	Rank
Khoirudin Mustakim	Class U45 (–45 kg)	Bye	Nguyen (VIE); W 49–47	Dhani (SIN); L 21–41	2nd place, silver medalist(s)
Antonius Efrem Tuke Eduk	Class A (45–50 kg)	Dumaan (PHI); W 37–20	Arli (THA); L 52–60	Did not advance	3rd place, bronze medalist(s)
Muhammad Zaki Zikrillah Prasong	Class C (55–60 kg)	Asri (SIN); W 55–40	Benitez (PHI); W 51–29	Janjaroen (THA); W WO	1st place, gold medalist(s)
Kadek Andrey Nova Prayada	Class D (60–65 kg)	Mitthasan (THA); L 29–30	Did not advance		
Tito Hendra Septa Kurnia	Class E (65–70 kg)	Lacao (PHI); W 43–17	Natdanai Keangkaew (THA); W 65–62	Helmi (MAS); W 63–52	1st place, gold medalist(s)
Iqbal Candra Pratama	Class F (70–75 kg)	Nurhisham (SIN); W 64–24	Maehci (THA); L 35–36	Did not advance	3rd place, bronze medalist(s)
Igi Rangga Barani	Class G (75–80 kg)	Bye	Sang (VIE); L 36–362	Did not advance	3rd place, bronze medalist(s)
Sadan Ahmed Sidik Lisanaka	Class I (85–90 kg)	Thu (MYA); W 57–32	Alauddin (SIN); L 42–45	Did not advance	3rd place, bronze medalist(s)

Women

Athlete	Event	Quarterfinal	Semifinal	Final	
Athlete	Event	Opposition Score	Opposition Score	Opposition Score	Rank
Safira Dwi Meilani	Class B (50–55 kg)	Aniqah (SIN); W 70–22	Ibutnande (PHI); W 60–21	Quyền (VIE); W 42–29	1st place, gold medalist(s)
Dinda Nuraidha	Class C (55–60 kg)	Thin (MYA); W 42–13	Mashitah (THA); L 89–91	Did not advance	3rd place, bronze medalist(s)

== Pétanque ==
Athlete	Event	Swiss stage			Semifinals	Final	
Athlete	Event	Opposition Result	Opposition Result	Rank	Opposition Result	Opposition Result	Rank
Andri Irawan	Men's single	Southammavong (LAO); W 13–10	C T Huynh (VIE); L 7–13	? Q	C T Huynh (VIE); W 13–11	Southammavong (LAO); W 13–7	1st place, gold medalist(s)
Topan Satria	Men's shooting	—N/a			Ahmad TM Nuzul (MAS); W 13–11	Nguyen V D (VIE); L 7–13	2nd place, silver medalist(s)
Anjani Dwi Apriliah	Women's single	Durratul I Y (MAS); L 9–11	Mary Grace M (PHI); W 13–7	? Q	Sirirat K (THA); L 6–13	Did not advance	3rd place, bronze medalist(s)
Anni Saputri Nijamudin	Women's shooting	—N/a			T Cherry K (MYA); L 30–37	Did not advance	3rd place, bronze medalist(s)
Heriyanto; Andreas Saputra Suwajianto; Warda Asifa	Mixed triples team (1 women + 2 men)	Ganjiang / Fueangsanit / Chamcoi (THA); L 1–13	A Bon / P Bon / Bacus (PHI); L 8–10	? Q	Ganjiang / Fueangsanit / Chamcoi (THA); L 1–13	Did not advance	3rd place, bronze medalist(s)

== Polo ==
Indonesia send an 8-man polo team to compete in the mixed 2–4 goals and 4–6 goals.

Team	Event	Preliminary				Semifinals	Final/BM	
Team	Event	Opposition Score	Opposition Score	Opposition Score	Rank	Opposition Score	Opposition Score	Rank
Acep Krisnandar; Rico Lianto; Glendy Martilas Buyung; Billy Barsel Lumintang; Jordy Christovel Ferdinand; Novel Alva Momongan; Ahmad Rajif Dizadila Ramadhan; Dwira Harlie Roring	2–4 goals	Malaysia (MAS); L 4 – 8	Philippines (PHI); L 3 – 5½	—N/a	5	Did not advance		
Acep Krisnandar; Rico Lianto; Glendy Martilas Buyung; Billy Barsel Lumintang; Jordy Christovel Ferdinand; Novel Alva Momongan; Ahmad Rajif Dizadila Ramadhan; Dwira Harlie Roring	4–6 goals	Malaysia (MAS); L 7½ – 12	Brunei (BRU); L 2 – 9	Thailand (THA); L 7 – 8	4 q	—N/a	Brunei (BRU); L 5 – 6	4

== Rowing ==
Athlete	Event	Preliminary		Final	
Athlete	Event	Time	Rank	Time	Rank
La Memo	Men's Singles sculls	08:25.130	1	08:10.247	1st place, gold medalist(s)
La Memo; Rendi Setia Maulana	Men's Doubles sculls	07:12.021	1	07:18.507	1st place, gold medalist(s)
Aprianto; Ferdiansyah	Men's Lightweight Pair	07:34.416	2	07:59.736	2nd place, silver medalist(s)
Ali Mardiansyah; Ardi Isadi; Ihram; Rafiq Wijdan Yasir	Men's Lightweight Quadruple Sculls	06:59.241	1	06:38.862	1st place, gold medalist(s)
Asuha Pattiiha	Men's Coastal Solo	02:35.60	2	02:45.62	4
Mutiara Rahma Putri; Lola Hanarina Blegur	Women's Doubles sculls	09:06.857	5	08:29.669	4
Chelsea Corputty; Issa Behuku; Mutiara Rahma Putri; Nurtang	Women's Quadruple Sculls	07:38.889	3	07:56.176	3rd place, bronze medalist(s)
Aisah Nabila; Andi Reski Rahmawati; Nur Azizah Patwa; Yunita Huby	Women's Four	08:07.084	3	07:43.294	2nd place, silver medalist(s)
Lola Hanarina Blegur	Women's Lightweight Singles Sculls	09:21.670	3	09:26.102	4
Arni Silva Pattipeiluhu	Women's Coastal Solo	02:52.42	3	02:57.58	2nd place, silver medalist(s)

== Rugby sevens ==
The Indonesia Rugby Football Union only send their women's team.

Team	Event	Preliminary round					Final/BM	
Team	Event	Opposition Score	Opposition Score	Opposition Score	Opposition Score	Rank	Opposition Score	Rank
Indonesia	Women's Tournament	Thailand; L 0–34	Singapore; L 5–12	Malaysia; L 7–22	Philippines; L 5–25	5	Did not advance	

Squad

Indonesia

- Lesly Adriana Deda
- Ina Angelina Yahmin
- Marice Yulita Olua
- Dina Verdinanda Olua
- Shalza Putriningsih
- Nadya Silva Khoirunissa
- Ni Komang Gita Suardni
- Ni Luh Putu Sanela Putri
- Monike Ardilla
- Qitarah Nauroh
- Rahma Andira Putri
- Adys Thabina Yusuf

== Sailing ==
Sailing

Athlete	Event	R1	R2	R3	R4	R5	R6	R7	R8	R9	R10	Total	Nett	Rank
Muhammad Adhit	Boy's Optimist	6.0	5.0	5.0	6.0	3.0	6.0	5.0	(7.0)	4.0	6.0	53.0	46.0	6
Gregory Roger Wardojo	Men's Laser Standard	7.0	5.0	4.0	3.0	4.0	4.0	4.0	5.0	(8.0 RET)	6.0	50.0	42.0	5
Kirana Wardojo	Women's Laser Radial	2.0	(4.0)	4.0	3.0	1.0	3.0	4.0	1.0	3.0	4.0	29.0	25.0	4

Kite boarding

Athlete	Event	R1	R2	R3	R4	R5	R6	R7	R8	R9	R10	R11	R12	R13	R14	R15	R16	Total	Nett	Rank
I Wayan Wiranatha Meranggi	Men's Formula Kite	3.0	(4.0)	(4.0)	4.0	(5.0 DNC)	4.0	4.0	4.0	4.0	4.0	4.0	4.0	4.0	4.0	4.0	4.0	64.0	51.0	4

== Sepak takraw ==
Athlete	Event	Group stage					Semifinals	Final	
Athlete	Event	Oppositions Scores	Oppositions Scores	Oppositions Scores	Oppositions Scores	Rank	Opposition Score	Opposition Score	Rank
Rusdi; Syamsul Akmal; Jelki Ladada; Muhammad Hardiansyah Muliang; Victoria Eka Prasetyo	Men's regu	—N/a		Singapore (SIN); W 2–0	Thailand (THA); L 0–2	2 Q	Malaysia (MAS); L 0–2	Did not advance	3rd place, bronze medalist(s)
Rusdi; Syamsul Akmal; Jelki Ladada; Muhammad Hardiansyah Muliang; Victoria Eka Prasetyo; Nofrizal; Syamsul Akmal; Muhammad Alhasani; Andi Dwy Andika; Yudha Aswinatama; Anwar Budiyanto; Muhammad Hafidz; Andi Try Sandi Saputra	Men's Team regu	—N/a		Brunei (BRU); W 2–1	Thailand (THA); L 0–3	2 Q	Malaysia (MAS); L 0–2	Did not advance	3rd place, bronze medalist(s)
Leni; Lena; Dona Aulia; Frisca Kharisma Indrasari; Fujy Anggy Lestari	Women's regu	—N/a	Thailand (THA); L 0–2	Vietnam (VIE); L 0–2	Malaysia (MAS); W 2–0	3	—N/a	Did not advance	3rd place, bronze medalist(s)
Leni; Lena; Dona Aulia; Frisca Kharisma Indrasari; Fujy Anggy Lestari; Kusnelia; Cici Herfiyuli; Rikha Kilmiyati; Dita Pratiwi; Wan Annisa Rachmadi; Salsa Sabillilah; Laura Dinda Yanatasya	Women's Team regu	—N/a	Myanmar (MYA); W 2–1	Cambodia (CAM); W WO	Malaysia (MAS); W 3–0	1 Q	Vietnam (VIE); L 0–2	Did not advance	3rd place, bronze medalist(s)
Leni; Dona Aulia; Fujy Anggy Lestari; Rusdi; Jelki Ladada; Muhammad Hardiansyah Muliang	Mixed Quadrant	—N/a	Thailand (THA); L 0–2	Philippines (PHI); W 2–0	—N/a	2 Q	Myanmar (MYA); W 2–0	Thailand (THA); L 0–2	2nd place, silver medalist(s)

== Shooting ==
=== Practical shooting ===
Athlete	Event	Final	
Athlete	Event	Points	Rank
Prabu Rakyan Raka Nalyndra	Men's Open individual	1,632.3037	2nd place, silver medalist(s)
Vincentius Djajadiningrat	Men's Production individual	1,655.4542	1st place, gold medalist(s)
Matthew Rey Haryanto	Men's Production individual	960.0483	9
Muhammad Awaludin Ilham	Men's Production optic individual	1,507.6242	3rd place, bronze medalist(s)
Omar Rawiendra Harnoko	Men's Production optic individual	1,243.5064	6
Hans Christian Pratama	Men's Standard individual	1,334.8401	3rd place, bronze medalist(s)
Khlil Gibran Muharram Harahap	Men's Standard individual	1,295.8516	6

Athlete	Event	Final	
Athlete	Event	Points	Rank
Sarah Ayu Tamaela	Women's Open individual	1,368.6061	2nd place, silver medalist(s)
Becca Phoebe Hendarmo	Women's Open individual	1,178.3724	5
Jennifer Restu Asmoro	Women's Production individual	806.9614	7
Sukmawati Abdullah	Women's Production optic individual	1,002.8508	3rd place, bronze medalist(s)
Putri Zhafirah Haryanto	Women's Production optic individual	935.7022	6
Putri Azzizah Haryanto	Women's Standard individual	1,122.0495	2nd place, silver medalist(s)
Almaas Rosi Nur Amalia	Women's Standard individual	1,061.1000	6

=== Pistol & rifle ===
Athlete	Event	Final	
Athlete	Event	Points	Rank
Sulthanul Aulia Maruf	Men's 10 m Air pistol individual	213.1	3rd place, bronze medalist(s)
Muhammad Iqbal Raia Prabowo	Men's 10 m Air pistol individual	154.5	6
Sulthanul Aulia Maruf; Muhammad Iqbal Raia Prabowo; Wira Sukmana	Men's 10 m Air pistol team	1736-56x	1st place, gold medalist(s)
Anang Yulianto	Men's 25 m Rapid fire pistol individual		
Muhamad Fawwaz Aditia Farrel	Men's 25 m Rapid fire pistol individual		
Anang Yulianto; Muhamad Fawwaz Aditia Farrel; Dewa Putu Yadi Suteja	Men's 25 m Rapid fire pistol team		
Izzuddin Afif	Men's 50 m Air rifle 3 individual		
Trisnarmanto	Men's 50 m Air rifle 3 individual		
Izzuddin Afif; Trisnarmanto	Men's 50 m Air rifle 3 team		

Athlete	Event	Final	
Athlete	Event	Points	Rank
Arista Perdana Putri Darmoyo	Women's 10 m Air pistol individual	177.0	5
Arista Perdana Putri Darmoyo; Rihadatul Asyifa; Derli Amalia Putri	Women's 10 m Air pistol team	1698-37x	1st place, gold medalist(s)
Dewi Laila Mubarokah	Women's 10 m Air rifle individual	248.5	1st place, gold medalist(s)
Dominique Rachmawati Karini	Women's 10 m Air rifle individual	248.2	2nd place, silver medalist(s)
Dewi Laila Mubarokah; Dominique Rachmawati Karini; Yasmin Figlia Achadiat	Women's 10 m Air rifle team	1875.1	1st place, gold medalist(s)
Rihadatul Asyifa	Women's 25 m Air pistol individual	24	4
Rihadatul Asyifa; Ahiva Awallu Nissa; Juliani Wenas	Women's 25 m Air pistol team	1716-42x	2nd place, silver medalist(s)
Dhiyaanisa Audrey Zahra	Women's 50 m Air rifle 3 individual	451.5	2nd place, silver medalist(s)
Diaz Kusumawardani	Women's 50 m Air rifle 3 individual	421.0	5
Dhiyaanisa Audrey Zahra; Diaz Kusumawardani; Resti Citra Dewi	Women's 50 m Air rifle 3 team	1712-60x	4

Team	Event	Preliminary		Final/BM	
Team	Event	Result	Rank	Opposition score	Rank
Arista Perdana Putri Darmoyo; Muhamad Iqbal Raia Prabowo	Mixed Team 10 m Air pistol	574-22x	1 Q	Vinh / Huy (VIE); W 17–9	1st place, gold medalist(s)
Febrian Anang; Yasmin Figlia Achadiat	Mixed Team 10 m Air Rifle	620.5	5 q	Jie; Hafiz (MAS); L 10–16	4

=== Shotgun ===
Athlete	Event	Final	
Athlete	Event	Points	Rank
Boki Andreas Yunus	Men's trap	30	3rd place, bronze medalist(s)
Aristyawan Bagus Sholeh	Men's trap		
Yemima Natalia Sinaga	Women's skeet	39	2nd place, silver medalist(s)
Fany Febriana Wulandari	Women's trap	38	1st place, gold medalist(s)
Adylia Safitri	Women's trap	16	5
Mastura Binte Rahim Siti	Women's trap		

== Skateboarding ==
Athlete	Event	Preliminary			Final	
Athlete	Event	Round 1	Round 2	Round 3	Score	Rank
Firdausy Nuzula Putra Hartanto	Men's Park	55.47	62.54	33.18	69.43	4
Farel Aldi Pamungkas	Men's Park	52.14	50.11	41.07	52.37	6
Basral Graito Hutomo	Men's Street	71.24	75.31	36.10	166.67	1st place, gold medalist(s)
Sanggoe Darma Tanjung	Men's Street	53.39	20.28	21.52	145.77	4
Nyimas Cinta Bunga	Women's Park	68.31	54.86	65.82	57.80	4
Mikhayla Shanum Caya	Women's Park	40.62	20.40	45.93	34.29	7
Ni Wayan Malana Fairbrother	Women's Street	44.58	47.06	15.99	125.42	2nd place, silver medalist(s)
Zeefara Mahika Darmawan	Women's Street	18.25	25.03	18.36	105.43	4

== Sport climbing ==
Boulder

Athlete	Event	Preliminary		Final	
Athlete	Event	Score	Rank	Score	Rank
Ferza Fernanda Abdi	Men	19.6	15	Did not advance	
Bomantara Bintang Prayuda	Men	53.8	11	Did not advance	
Rizki Aditya	Men	54.3	7	29.9	5
Nur Khalishah	Women	30.0	13	Did not advance	
Nur Ismatul Sakdia	Women	59.7	7	10.0	6
Mavra Azalia Nabila	Women	54.3	8	10.0	7

Lead

Athlete	Event	Preliminary					Final	
Athlete	Event	R1 Score	R1 Rank	R2 Score	R2 Rank	Pts	Score	Rank
Muhammad Ramzi Firmansyah	Men	0+	13	1+	12	12.49	Did not advance	
Mahesa Caesar	Men	34	2	40+	2	2.0	37+	3rd place, bronze medalist(s)
Ardana Cikal Damarwulan	Men	34+	1	37+	3	1.73	39+	1st place, gold medalist(s)
Sukma Lintang Cahyani	Women	TOP	1	TOP	1	1.73	42	2nd place, silver medalist(s)
Nur Diatul Jannah	Women	30+	7	20+	11	9.38	Did not advance	
Alma Ariella Tsany	Women	TOP	1	TOP	1	1.73	TOP	1st place, gold medalist(s)

Speed

Athlete	Event	Preliminary				Quarterfinals	Semifinals	Final/BM	
Athlete	Event	Lane A	Lane B	Time	Rank	Opposition Time	Opposition Time	Opposition Time	Rank
Alfian Muhammad Fajri	Men	5.24	5.39	5.24	2	Ho Andre Jin Rui (SGP); W 5.61–9.02	Low Ezell Qing Wei (SGP); W 5.35–8.52	Antasyafi Robby Al Hilmi (INA); L 5.08–4.83	2nd place, silver medalist(s)
Antasyafi Robby Al Hilmi	Men	4.88	5.21	4.88	1	Haddan Malik Baqmuhyibar (INA); W 5.05–5.77	Limpanichpakdee Aphiwit (THA); W 4.82–4.96	Alfian Muhammad Fajri (INA); W 4.83–5.08	1st place, gold medalist(s)
Haddan Malik Baqmuhyibar	Men	6.81	8.08	6.81	8	Antasyafi Robby Al Hilmi (INA); L 5.77–5.05	Did not advance		
Puja Lestari	Women	7.13	7.13	7.13	1	Kaitwatcharachai Jiraporn (THA); W 9.45–10.42	Naura Jasmine Rayya Syafiqa (INA); W 7.24–9.75	Susan Nur Hidayah (INA); W 7.33–8.22	1st place, gold medalist(s)
Susan Nur Hidayah	Women	7.28	7.48	7.28	2	Dela Cruz Sofielle PrajatI (PHI); W 7.52–9.39	Arsakit Kanyanat (THA); W 7.29–7.75	Puja Lestari (INA); L 8.22–7.33	2nd place, silver medalist(s)
Naura Jasmine Rayya Syafiqa	Women	7.89	9.13	7.89	4	Thongbai Ratchamon (THA); W 7.79–FALL	Puja Lestari (INA); L 9.75–7.24	Arsakit Kanyanat (THA); L FALL–12.07	4

== Squash ==
Athlete	Event	Round of 16/ Preliminary	Quarterfinals/Preliminary	Rank	Semifinals	Final	
Athlete	Event	Opposition Score	Opposition Score	Rank	Opposition Score	Opposition Score	Rank
Muhammad Fathan Azzikri	Men's singles	Thura (MYA); W 3–0	Lee (MAS); L 0–3	—N/a	Did not advance		
Raifa Putri Yattaqi	Women's singles	Bye	Aribado (PHI); L 0–3	—N/a	Did not advance		
Achmad Fauzi; Muhammad Rifaa Ramadhan	Men's U21 jumbo doubles	—N/a	Limphaiboon / Theerasilp (THA); W 2–0	—N/a	Buraga / Reyes (PHI); L 0–2	Did not advance	3rd place, bronze medalist(s)
Achmad Fauzi; Raifa Putri Yattaqi	Mixed U21 jumbo doubles	Thura / Pyae (MAS); W 2–0	Ong / Chua (SIN); L 1–2	2 Q	Relano / Reyes (PHI); L 1–2	Did not advance	3rd place, bronze medalist(s)

== Swimming ==
=== Men ===
Athlete	Event	Heats		Final	
Athlete	Event	Result	Rank	Result	Rank
Jason Donovan Yusuf	50 m freestyle	22.80	10	Did not advance	
Samuel Maxson Septionus	50 m freestyle	22.87	7 Q	22.94	7
Joe Aditya Wijaya Kurniawan	100 m freestyle	51.34	8 Q	50.59	8
Kevin Erlangga Prayitno	100 m freestyle	51.41	9	Did not advance	
Made Aubrey Jaya	200 m freestyle	1:51.34	2 Q	1:50.97	6
Nicholas Karel Subagyo	200 m freestyle	1:51.71	5 Q	1:50.86	5
Nicholas Karel Subagyo	400 m freestyle	4:01.86	6 Q	3:57.29	5
Made Aubrey Jaya	400 m freestyle	4:03.43	8 Q	3:57.33	6
Nicholas Karel Subagyo	1500 m freestyle	16:08.85	7 Q	15:59.60	6
Mochammad Akbar Putra Taufik	1500 m freestyle	15:57.68	6 Q	15:56.57	5
I Gede Siman Sudartawa	50 m backstroke	25.57	6 Q	25.49	3rd place, bronze medalist(s)
Jason Donovan Yusuf	50 m backstroke	25.47	2 Q	25.36	1st place, gold medalist(s)
Jason Donovan Yusuf	100 m backstroke	56.84	2 Q	55.08	1st place, gold medalist(s)
Farrel Armando Tangkas	100 m backstroke	57.71	7 Q	55.89	2nd place, silver medalist(s)
Farrel Armando Tangkas	200 m backstroke	2:05.52	1 Q	2:01.63	2nd place, silver medalist(s)
Jason Donovan Yusuf	200 m backstroke	2:09.00	3 Q	2:07.70	8
Felix Viktor Ibele	50 m breaststroke	28.00	1 Q	28.02	3rd place, bronze medalist(s)
Muhammad Dwiky Raharjo	50 m breaststroke	28.77	6 Q	28.77	7
Muhammad Dwiky Raharjo	100 m breaststroke	1:01.75	4 Q	1:02.01	4
Muhammad Dwiky Raharjo	200 m breaststroke	—N/a		2:16.77	4
Samuel Maxson Septionus	50 m butterfly	25.00	8 Q	24.91	8
Joe Aditya Wijaya Kurniawan	50 m butterfly	24.06	2 Q	24.09	4
Joe Aditya Wijaya Kurniawan	100 m butterfly	54.68		53.14	2nd place, silver medalist(s)
Jason Donovan Yusuf	100 m butterfly	54.87		54.66	7
Mochammad Akbar Putra Taufik	200 m butterfly	2:08.82	5	2:06.46	7
Liquor Harrison Andoko	200 m individual medley	2:09.58	6 Q	2:09.88	8
Nicholas Karel Subagyo	200 m individual medley	2:07.47	1 Q	2:06.71	6
Joe Aditya Wijaya Kurniawan; Jeremy Elyon Masterganesha; Kevin Erlangga Prayitno; Samuel Maxson Septionus	4 × 100 m freestyle relay	—N/a		3:21.92	4
Mochammad Akbar Putra Taufik; Liquor Harrison Andoko; Made Aubrey Jaya; Nicholas karel Subagyo	4 × 200 m freestyle relay	—N/a		7:27.17	5
Joe Aditya Wijaya Kurniawan; Kevin Erlangga Prayitno; Samuel Maxson Septionus; Farrel Armandio Tangkas	4 × 100 m medley relay	—N/a		3:41.75	4

=== Women ===
Athlete	Event	Heats		Final	
Athlete	Event	Result	Rank	Result	Rank
Adelia Chantika Aulia	50 m freestyle	26.18	6 Q	26.44	7
Nadia Aisha Nurazmi	50 m freestyle	26.08	5 Q	25.68	5
Nadia Aisha Nurazmi	100 m freestyle	57.53	5 Q	56.50	5
Serena Karmelita Muslim	100 m freestyle	58.92	9 q	58.30	8
Serena Karmelita Muslim	200 m freestyle	NT		2:07.96	8
Izzy Dwifana Hefrisyanthi	200 m freestyle	2:06.29		Did not advance	
Izzy Dwifana Hefrisyanthi	400 m freestyle	4:30.80	6	4:33.21	6
Izzy Dwifana Hefrisyanthi	800 m freestyle	Bye		9:11.26	7
Masniari Wolf	50 m backstroke	29.12	2 Q	28.80	1st place, gold medalist(s)
Flairene Candrea	50 m backstroke	28.86	1 Q	28.94	4
Flairene Candrea	100 m backstroke	1:03.59	5 Q	1:02.60	3rd place, bronze medalist(s)
Adelia Chantika Aulia	100 m backstroke	1:03.50	4 Q	1:02.94	4
Adelia Chantika Aulia	200 m backstroke	2:24.84	8 Q	2:16.39	3rd place, bronze medalist(s)
Adellia	50 m breaststroke	32.51	6 Q	32.77	7
Adellia	100 m breaststroke	1:11.56	5 Q	1:10.92	6
Adellia	200 m breaststroke	2:38.68	6 Q	2:32.50	3rd place, bronze medalist(s)
Adelia Chantika Aulia	50 m butterfly	28.75	7	Did not advance	
Nadia Aisha Nurazmi	50 m butterfly	28.64	6 Q	28.21	7
Nadia Aisha Nurazmi	100 m butterfly	1:03.97	7 Q	1:02.17	6
Michelle Surjadi Fang	100 m butterfly	1:02.61	5 Q	1:01.67	4
Izzy Dwifana Hefrisyanthi	200 m butterfly	2:22.35	7	Did not advance	
Michelle Surjadi Fang	200 m butterfly	2:18.05	4 Q	2:15.10	4
Michelle Surjadi Fang	400 m individual medley	5:12.55	10	Did not advance	
Adelia Chantika Aulia; Serena Karmelita Muslim; Nadia Aisha Nurazmi; Ni Putu Pande Lisa Primasari	4 × 100 m freestyle relay	—N/a		3:50.56	5
Adelia Chantika Aulia; Serena Karmelita Muslim; Nadia Aisha Nurazmi; Ni Putu Pande Lisa Primasari	4 × 200 m freestyle relay	—N/a		8:35.23	5
Adelia Chantika Aulia; Adellia; Flairene Candrea; Michelle Surjadi Fang	4 × 100 m medley relay	—N/a		4:13.02	5

== Taekwondo ==
Freestyle Poomsae

Athlete	Event	Final	
Athlete	Event	Score	Rank
Andi Sultan Altaf Mirza	Men's individual	7.360	4

Recognized Poomsae

Athlete	Event	Quarterfinal	Semifinal	Final	
Athlete	Event	Opposition Score	Opposition Score	Opposition Score	Rank
Muhammad Alfi Kusuma; Muhammad Hafizh Fachrur Rhozy; Muhammad Rizal	Men's team	Myanmar (MYA); W W/O	Malaysia (MAS); W 8.650–8.440	Philippines (PHI); W 8.710–8.530	1st place, gold medalist(s)

Kyorugi

Athlete	Event	Round of 16	Quarterfinals	Semifinals	Final	
Athlete	Event	Opposition Score	Opposition Score	Opposition Score	Opposition Score	Rank
Aziz Hidayat Tumakaka	Men's –54 kg	Bye	Perumal (MAS); W 2–0	Keston (SIN); W 2–0	Trong (VIE); L 1–2	2nd place, silver medalist(s)
Arya Danu Susilo	Men's +68 kg	—N/a	Bye	Krittayot (THA); W 2–0	Ly H P (VIE); W 2–0	1st place, gold medalist(s)
Muhammad Raihan Fadhila	Men's +74 kg	—N/a	Bye	Zaw (MYA); W 2–0	Saejo (THA); L 0–2	2nd place, silver medalist(s)
Osanando Naufal Khairudin	Men's +80 kg	—N/a	Bye	Chaichon (THA); L 0–2	Did not advance	3rd place, bronze medalist(s)
Ni Kadek Heni Prikasih	Women's -46 kg	—N/a	Bye	Sarza (PHI); L 0–2	Did not advance	3rd place, bronze medalist(s)
Winda Dwi Putri	Women's +46 kg	—N/a	Domingas (TLS); W 2–0	Mangin (PHI); L 0–2	Did not advance	3rd place, bronze medalist(s)
Megawati Tamesti Maheswari	Women's +49 kg	—N/a	Xuan (SIN); W 2–0	Chutikan (THA); L 0–2	Did not advance	3rd place, bronze medalist(s)
Silvana Lamanda	Women's +53 kg	—N/a	Bye	Phannapa (THA); L 0–2	Did not advance	3rd place, bronze medalist(s)

== Teqball ==
Team	Event	Group stage				Semifinal	Final	
Team	Event	Opposition Score	Opposition Score	Opposition Score	Rank	Opposition Score	Opposition Score	Rank
Yoga Ardika Putra	Men's Singles	Giong (VIE); W 12–9, 12–10	Friday (MYA); W 12–7, 12–5	Alisa (LAO); W 12–2, 12–8	1 Q	Hameed (MAS); W 12–11, 12–7	Kukeaw (THA); L 10–12, 6–12	2nd place, silver medalist(s)
La Ode Mardan M Husni Uba	Men's Doubles	Montenegro / Pacis (PHI); W 12–3, 12–4	Eizlan / Faris (MAS); W 12–9, 11–12, 12–6	Keovilaiket / Vilavongsa (LAO); W 12–2, 12–3	1 Q	Keovilaiket / Vilavongsa (VIE); W 11–12, 12–8, 12–5	Jirati / Sorrasak (THA); L 11–12, 2–12	2nd place, silver medalist(s)
Zikhra Dwi Putri	Women's Singles	Phonexay (LAO); W 12–2, 12–6	Hsu (MYA); W 12–5, 12–7	Trinh (VIE); W 12–5, 12–2	1 Q	Amyra (MAS); W 12–4, 12–8	Kuntatong (THA); L 1–12, 6–12	2nd place, silver medalist(s)
Gabriella Jessica Pongbura; Akkyo Miheel Kapito	Women's Doubles	Carino / Tabucol (PHI); W 12–1, 12–5	Hsu / Naing (MYA); L 7–12, 2–12	Trinh / Thu (VIE); W 12–8, 8–12, 12–9	2 Q	Kuntatong / Wongkhamchan (THA); L 7–12, 2–12	Did not advance	3rd place, bronze medalist(s)
Muhammad Azwar; Sumaya	Mixed Doubles	Polca / Tabucol (PHI); W 12–0, 12–1	Jafri / Daud (MAS); W 12–5, 9–12, 12–10	Lattanabounmee / Inthalapeth (LAO); W 12–5, 12–3	1 Q	Lwin / Naing (MYA); L 12–11, 7–12, 3–12	Did not advance	3rd place, bronze medalist(s)

== Tennis ==
The Indonesian Tennis Team sent 10 athletes to compete in the 2025 SEA Games consisting of 5 male athletes and 5 female athletes

Men

Athlete	Event	Round of 16	Quarter-finals	Semifinals	Final	
Athlete	Event	Opposition Score	Opposition Score	Opposition Score	Opposition Score	Rank
Muhammad Rifqi Fitriadi	Singles	Olivarez (PHI); W 6–2, 6–2	Jimenez (SIN); W 6–3, 6–0	Samrej (THA); L 2–6, 5–7	Did not advance	3rd place, bronze medalist(s)
Justin Barki	Singles	Yew (SIN); L 0–4 RET	Did not advance			
Ignatius Anthony Susanto; Lucky Chandra Kurniawan	Doubles	Nguyen / Dinh (VIE); W 7–6, 7–6	Imran / Kumar (MAS); W 6–2, 6–4	Isaro / Jones (THA); L 2–6, 3–6	Did not advance	3rd place, bronze medalist(s)
Christopher Rungkat; Muhammad Rifqi Fitriadi	Doubles	Bye	Yew / Meqsuq (SIN); W 6–2, 7–6(5)	Pawit / Wishaya (THA); L 2–6, 6(7)–7	Did not advance	3rd place, bronze medalist(s)
Christopher Rungkat; Muhammad Rifqi Fitriadi; Ignatius Anthony Susanto; Lucky Candra Kurniawan; Justin Barki	Team	—N/a	Vietnam (VIE); W 3–0	Philippines (PHI); W 2–1	Thailand (THA); W 2–1	1st place, gold medalist(s)

Women

Athlete	Event	Round of 16	Quarter-finals	Semifinals	Final	
Athlete	Event	Opposition Score	Opposition Score	Opposition Score	Opposition Score	Rank
Priska Madelyn Nugroho	Singles	Thasaporn (THA) L 6–2, 3–6, 3–6	Did not advance			
Janice Tjen	Singles	Bye	Milliam (PHI) W 6–3, 6–4	Sawangkaew (THA) L 4–6 RET	Did not advance	3rd place, bronze medalist(s)
Aldila Sutjiadi; Janice Tjen	Doubles	Bye	Desvignes / Tan (SIN); W 6–1, 4–6, 10–6	Aludo / Madis (PHI); W 6–1, 6–1	Tararudee / Plipuech (THA); W	1st place, gold medalist(s)
Anjali Kirana Junarto; Priska Madelyn Nugroho	Doubles	Tong / Chua (SIN); W 6–1, 6–0	Rivera / Milliam (PHI); W 6–4, 6–3	Tararudee / Plipuech (THA); L 6(5)–7, 2–6	Did not advance	3rd place, bronze medalist(s)
Anjali Kirana Junarto; Priska Madelyn Nugroho; Meydiana Laviola Reinnamah; Aldila Sutjiadi; Janice Tjen	Team	—N/a	Laos (LAO); W 3–0	Malaysia (MAS); W 3–0	Thailand (THA); W 2–1	1st place, gold medalist(s)

Mixed

Athlete	Event	Round of 16	Quarter-finals	Semifinals	Final	
Athlete	Event	Opposition Score	Opposition Score	Opposition Score	Opposition Score	Rank
Christopher Rungkat; Aldila Sutjiadi	Mixed doubles	Hazli / Imran (MAS); W 6–2, 6–4	Viet / Savanna (VIE); W 6–1, 6–0	Isaro / Plipuech (THA); L 6–4, 3–6, 5–10	Did not advance	3rd place, bronze medalist(s)
Ignatius Anthony Susanto; Meydiana Laviola Reinnamah	Mixed doubles	Abadia / Lin (SIN); L 6–4, 1–6, 6–10	Did not advance			

== Triathlon ==
=== Triathlon ===
Athlete	Event	Final	
Athlete	Event	Time	Rank
Rashif Amila Yaqin	Men's Individual		1st place, gold medalist(s)
Aloysius Reckyardo Mardian	Men's Individual		9
Martina Ayu Pratiwi	Women's Individual		1st place, gold medalist(s)
Binta Erlen Sasabilla	Women's Individual		4
Aloysius Reckyardo Mardian; Al Kautsar; Rashif Amila Yaqin	Team 3 Men Relay	01:04:35	3rd place, bronze medalist(s)
Martina Ayu Pratiwi; Binta Erlen Sasabilla; Renata Berliana Aditya	Team 3 Women Relay	01:10:48	2nd place, silver medalist(s)
Martina Ayu Pratiwi; Binta Erlen Sasabilla; Rashif Amila Yaqin; Hauqalah Fakhal Arvyello	Team Mixed Relay 2 Men+ 2 Women	01:30:35	2nd place, silver medalist(s)

=== Aquathlon ===
Athlete	Event	Final	
Athlete	Event	Time	Rank
Muhammad Noval Ashidiq; Muhammad Zidane; Rashif Amila Yaqin	Team 3 Men Relay	00:46:23	1st place, gold medalist(s)
Martina Ayu Pratiwi; Kayla Nadia Shafa; Binta Erlen Salsabela	Team 3 Women Relay	00:51:23	1st place, gold medalist(s)
Muhammad Zidane; Rashif Amila Yaqin; Martina Ayu Pratiwi; Kayla Nadia Shafa	Team Mixed Relay 2 Men+ 2 Women	01:04:14	1st place, gold medalist(s)

=== Duathlon ===
Athlete	Event	Final	
Athlete	Event	Time	Rank
Alias Praji; Hauqalah Fakhal Arvyello; Ronal Bintang Setiawan	Team 3 Men Relay	01:06:55	2nd place, silver medalist(s)
Eva Desiana; Zahra Bulan Aprilia Putri; Martina Ayu Pratiwi	Team 3 Women Relay	01:13:33	1st place, gold medalist(s)
Alias Praji; Hauqalah Fakhal Arvyello; Zahra Bulan Aprilia Putri; Martina Ayu Pratiwi	Team Mixed Relay 2 Men+ 2 Women	01:33:58	1st place, gold medalist(s)

== Volleyball ==
=== Beach ===
Team	Event	Preliminary round						Semi finals	Finals / BM	
Team	Event	Opposition Score	Opposition Score	Opposition Score	Opposition Score	Opposition Score	Rank	Opposition Score	Opposition Score	Rank
Danangsyah Yudistira Pribadi; Sofyan Rachman Efendi; Bintang Akbar; Yosi Ariel Firnanda	Men's team	Laos (LAO); W 2–0	Vietnam (VIE); W 2–0	Philippines (PHI); W 2–1	—N/a		1 Q	Malaysia (MAS); W 2–0	Thailand (THA); W 2–1	1st place, gold medalist(s)
Desi Ratnasari; Herdanti Bernadetta Shella; Nur Atika Sari; Josephine Selvina Anasthasya Kaize	Women's team	Philippines (PHI); L 1–2	Thailand (THA); L 0–2	Singapore (SIN); W 2–0	Malaysia (MAS); W 2–0	Vietnam (VIE); W 2–1	3 q	—N/a	Vietnam (VIE); L 1–2	4

=== Indoor ===
Team	Event	Group stage				Semi-finals	Final/BM	
Team	Event	Opposition Score	Opposition Score	Opposition Score	Rank	Opposition Score	Opposition Score	Rank
Indonesia	Men's tournament	Myanmar; W 3–0	Philippines; W 3–0	—N/a	1 Q	Vietnam; W 3–2	Thailand; L 2–3	2nd place, silver medalist(s)
Indonesia	Women's tournament	Malaysia; W 3–0	Myanmar; W 3–0	Vietnam; L 0–3	2 Q	Thailand; L 0–3	Philippines; W 3–1	3rd place, bronze medalist(s)

Rosters

Men	Women
Jordan Susanto; Boy Arnez Arabi; Hendra Kurniawan; Rama Fazza Fauzan; Alfin Daniel Pratama; Fahry Septian Putratama; Rivan Nurmulki; Daffa Naufal Mauluddani; Kristoforus Sina; Jasen Natanael Kilanta; Agil Angga Anggara; Fahreza Rakha Abhinaya; Tedi Oka Syahputra; Prasojo	Ajeng Nur Cahaya; Chelsa Berliana Nurtomo; Mediol Stiovanny Yoku; Yolana Betha Pangestika; Megawati Hangestri Pertiwi; Indah Guretno Dwi Margiani; Ersandrina Devega; Geofanny Eka Cahyaningtyas; Naisya Pratama Putri; Rika Dwi Latri; Pascalina Mahuze; Maradanti Namira Tegariana; Sulastri Rahma Aulia; Syelomitha Afrilaviza Injilia Wongkar

== Water polo ==
Team	Event	Preliminary				Rank
Team	Event	Opposition Score	Opposition Score	Opposition Score	Opposition Score	Rank
Indonesia men's team	Men's team	Philippines (PHI); W 28–3	Malaysia (MAS); W 17–6	Thailand (THA); W 10–7	Singapore (SGP); L 16–19	2nd place, silver medalist(s)
Indonesia women's team	Women's team	Thailand (THA); L 7–19	Philippines (PHI); W 26–3	Singapore (SGP); L 5–20	Malaysia (MAS); W 26–16	3rd place, bronze medalist(s)

Squads

Men's Squad

Ahmad Fauzy Mappatabe
Hizkia Bimantoro
Novian Dwiputra
Rezza Auditya Putra
Ridjkie Mulia
Brahni Cahyandra Samudera
Delvin Felliciano
Didi Akbar

Hosea Krisna Setiawan
Muhamad Zein Dzaki Julian
Muhammad Alwi Irhash
Revanza Rizky Rahman
Rezabakti Mulia
Regi Mulya Ramdhani
Avicenna Aqeel Umarella

Women's Squad

Aenah Aeliyah Purbaningrum
Febrina Indriasari
Indah Safitri
Jeanette Ayu Puspita
Melyn Cecilia Legawa
Adila Putri Shabirah
Amazia Keyko Radisty

Annisa Nurul Aulia
Bilqis Kautsar Uzmut
Lathifa Hazna Azka Rahayu
Selfia Nur Fitroch
Theresia Putri Argya Wibowo
Thytania Rhamadini Putri

== Water skiing and wakeboarding ==
Athlete	Event	Score	Rank
Indra Hardinata; Guruh Dwi Samudra; Safira Ratriandari Widodo; Ummu Thoyibhatus Sholikah	Water Ski Slalom	280	1st place, gold medalist(s)
Jason; Kevin Gladian; Kanaya Anindita; Rahmadani Citra Mahaueni	Wakeboard Team	120	2nd place, silver medalist(s)
Jason; Kevin Gladian; Kanaya Anindita; Rahmadani Citra Mahaueni	Cable Wakeboard Team	50	4
Piki Lestari; Aldi Akmaludin; Kevin Gelbert Fotaroma Wau; Melani	Wake Surf Team	144	2nd place, silver medalist(s)

== Weightlifting ==
Men

Athlete	Event	Snatch		Clean & Jerk		Total	Rank
Athlete	Event	Result	Rank	Result	Rank	Total	Rank
Ricko Saputra	60 kg	132	1	163	2	295	2nd place, silver medalist(s)
Eko Yuli Irawan	65 kg	138	1	166	3	304	3rd place, bronze medalist(s)
Ardaraya	71 kg	132	4	170	4	302	4
Rizki Juniansyah	79 kg	160	1	205 WR	1	365 WR	1st place, gold medalist(s)
Rahmat Erwin Abdullah	88 kg	160	3	202	1	362	1st place, gold medalist(s)
M Zul Ilmi	94 kg	143	4	187	4	337	4

Women

Athlete	Event	Snatch		Clean & Jerk		Total	Rank
Athlete	Event	Result	Rank	Result	Rank	Total	Rank
Luluk Diana Tri Wijayana	48 kg	84	1	100	1	184	1st place, gold medalist(s)
Juliana Klarisa	53 kg	77	5	100	5	177	5
Natasya Beteyob	58 kg	98	1	120	2	218	2nd place, silver medalist(s)
Sarah Aca	63 kg	95	4	115	4	210	4
Indah Afriza	69 kg	99	3	128	2	227	2nd place, silver medalist(s)
Alyamaulida Kartika Pertiwi	77 kg	91	2	115	2	206	2nd place, silver medalist(s)

== Wushu ==
Changquan - Daoshu - Gunshu

Athlete	Event	Final				
Athlete	Event	Changquan	Daoshu	Gunshu	Total	Rank
Edgar Xavier Marvelo	Men's Changquan - Daoshu - Gunshu	9.776	9.780	9.793	29.349	1st place, gold medalist(s)
Seraf Naro Siregar	Men's Changquan - Daoshu - Gunshu	9.680	9.786	9.780	29.246	2nd place, silver medalist(s)

Changquan - Jianshu - Qianshu

Athlete	Event	Final				
Athlete	Event	Changquan	Jianshu	Gunshu	Total	Rank
Patricia Geraldine	Women's Changquan - Jianshu - Gunshu	9.750	9.760	9.756	29.266	1st place, gold medalist(s)

Duilian

Athlete	Event	Final	
Athlete	Event	Total	Rank
Ahmad Ghifari Fuaiz; Ahmad Ghozali Fuaiz; Terrence Tjahyadi	Men's Duilian Bare - handed	9.746	1st place, gold medalist(s)
Ahmad Ghifari Fuaiz; Edgar Xavier Marvelo; Seraf Naro Siregar	Men's Duilian Weapon	9.740	2nd place, silver medalist(s)
Tasya Ayu Puspa Dewi; Eugenia Diva Widodo	Women's Duilian Bare - handed	9.620	2nd place, silver medalist(s)

Nanquan - Nandao - Nangun

Athlete	Event	Final				
Athlete	Event	Nanquan	Nandao	Nangun	Total	Rank
Terrence Tjahyadi	Men's Nanquan - Nandao - Nangun	9.746	9.766	9.696	29.209	4
Ahmad Ghozali Fuaiz	Men's Nanquan - Nandao - Nangun	9.730	9.736	9.730	29.199	5

Sanda

Athlete	Event	Quarterfinals	Semifinals	Final	
Athlete	Event	Opposition Score	Opposition Score	Opposition Score	Rank
Samuel Marbun	Men's 65 kg	Lim (MAS); W 2–0	Alipio (PHI); W 1–0	Khunphet (THA); W 2–0	1st place, gold medalist(s)
Harry Brahmana	Men's 70 kg	Hwa (MAS); W 2–0	Truong (VIE); L WPD	Did not advance	3rd place, bronze medalist(s)
Tharisa Dea Florentina	Women's 56 kg	Ngo (VIE); W 2–0	Wong (MAS); W WPD	Cherry (MYA); W 2–0	1st place, gold medalist(s)
Thania Kusumaningtyas	Women's 60 kg	Nguyễn (VIE); L 0–2	Did not advance		

Taijiquan - Taijijian

Athlete	Event	Final			
Athlete	Event	Taijiquan	Taijijian	Total	Rank
Rainer Reinaldy Ferdiansyah	Men's Taijiquan - Taijijian	9.750	9.743	19.490	6
Alexandra Calista Setiawan	Women's Taijiquan - Taijijian	9.730	9.740	19.470	7

== See also ==
- Indonesia at the 2025 World Games
- Indonesia at the 2025 Islamic Solidarity Games
- Indonesia at the 2025 Asian Youth Games
- 2025 Asian Youth Para Games
- 2025 ASEAN School Games
