= Swimming at the 2025 SEA Games – Men's 400 metre individual medley =

Men's 400 metre individual medley at the 2025 SEA Games
- Venue: SAT Swimming Pool
- Date: 12 December
- Competitors: 6 from 5 nations
- Winning time: 4:19.98

Medalists
| gold medal | Nguyễn Quang Thuấn | Vietnam |
| silver medal | Trần Hưng Nguyên | Vietnam |
| bronze medal | Tan Khai Xin | Malaysia |

The men's 400 metre individual medley event at the 2025 SEA Games took place on 12 December 2025 at the SAT Swimming Pool in Bangkok, Thailand.

== Schedule ==
All times are Indochina Standard Time (UTC+07:00)

| Date | Time | Event |
|---|---|---|
| Friday, 12 December 2025 | 18:04 | Final |

== Records ==
Prior to this competition, the existing world, Asian, and Southeast Asian Games records were as follows.

| World Record | Léon Marchand (FRA) | 4:02.50 | Fukuoka, Japan | 23 July 2023 |
| Asian Record | Kosuke Hagino (JPN) | 4:06.05 | Rio de Janeiro, Brazil | 6 August 2016 |
| Games Record | Trần Hưng Nguyên (VIE) | 4:18.10 | Hanoi, Vietnam | 15 May 2022 |

== Results ==
=== Final ===
| Rank | Lane | Swimmer | Nationality | Time | Notes |
|---|---|---|---|---|---|
| 1st place, gold medalist(s) | 5 | Nguyễn Quang Thuấn | Vietnam | 4:19.98 | |
| 2nd place, silver medalist(s) | 4 | Trần Hưng Nguyên | Vietnam | 4:25.45 | |
| 3rd place, bronze medalist(s) | 6 | Tan Khai Xin | Malaysia | 4:25.98 | |
| 4 | 2 | Gian Santos | Philippines | 4:27.59 | |
| 5 | 3 | Zackery Tay | Singapore | 4:34.01 | |
| 6 | 7 | Peerapat Settheechaichana | Thailand | 4:36.65 | |
