= Wrestling at the 2025 SEA Games =

- Venue: Pacific Park Sriracha
- Location: Si Racha, Thailand
- Dates: 17-19 December 2025
- Competitors: 66 from 9 nations

Wrestling competitions at the 2025 SEA Games took place at Pacific Park Sriracha in Si Racha, Chonburi, Thailand from 17 to 19 December 2025. The competition was originally planned to be held at Central Hatyai in Hat Yai before it was decided to relocate the competition to Pacific Park Sriracha on 27 November 2025 due to flooding in Songkhla. Medals were awarded in 12 events in two categories, 8 in freestyle wrestling and 4 in Greco-Roman wrestling.

== Participating nations ==
There are 9 participating nations:

- Indonesia (12)
- Laos (2)
- Malaysia (1)
- Myanmar (8)
- Philippines (11)
- Singapore (6)
- Thailand (12)
- Timor-Leste (2)
- Vietnam (12)

== Medal table ==
* Host nation (Thailand)

Rank	Nation	Gold	Silver	Bronze	Total
1	Vietnam	10	1	1	12
2	Indonesia	1	6	3	10
3	Philippines	1	4	4	9
4	Thailand*	0	1	9	10
5	Myanmar	0	0	3	3
6	Laos	0	0	2	2
6	Singapore	0	0	2	2
Totals (7 entries)		12	12	24	48

== Medalists ==
=== Men's Greco-Roman ===
Event	Gold	Silver	Bronze
67 kg	Muhammad Aliansyah; Indonesia	Bùi Mạnh Hùng; Vietnam	Dawson Sihavong; Laos
67 kg	Muhammad Aliansyah; Indonesia	Bùi Mạnh Hùng; Vietnam	Nuttapong Hinmee; Thailand
77 kg	Nguyễn Công Mạnh; Vietnam	Andika Sulaeman; Indonesia	Jason Baucas; Philippines
77 kg	Nguyễn Công Mạnh; Vietnam	Andika Sulaeman; Indonesia	Wisit Thamwirat; Thailand
87 kg	Nghiêm Đình Hiếu; Vietnam	Lulut Gilang Saputra; Indonesia	Gabriel Yang Yi; Singapore
87 kg	Nghiêm Đình Hiếu; Vietnam	Lulut Gilang Saputra; Indonesia	Aunthin Peerawat; Thailand
97 kg	Nguyễn Minh Hiếu; Vietnam	Ashar Ramadhani; Indonesia	Callum Johnson Roberts; Philippines
97 kg	Nguyễn Minh Hiếu; Vietnam	Ashar Ramadhani; Indonesia	Anis Baimud; Thailand

=== Men's Freestyle ===
Event	Gold	Silver	Bronze
57 kg	Phạm Như Duy; Vietnam	Hayden Ancheta; Philippines	Zainal Abidin; Indonesia
57 kg	Phạm Như Duy; Vietnam	Hayden Ancheta; Philippines	Nattawut Kaewkhuanchum; Thailand
65 kg	Nguyễn Hữu Định; Vietnam	Ronil Tubog; Philippines	Dawson Sihavong; Laos
65 kg	Nguyễn Hữu Định; Vietnam	Ronil Tubog; Philippines	Siripong Junpakam; Thailand
74 kg	Nghiêm Đình Hiếu; Vietnam	Gilang Ilhaza; Indonesia	Michael Dargani; Philippines
74 kg	Nghiêm Đình Hiếu; Vietnam	Gilang Ilhaza; Indonesia	Parinya Chamnanjan; Thailand
86 kg	Gabriel Dinette; Philippines	Chiranuwat Chamnanjan; Thailand	Trần Văn Trường Vũ; Vietnam
86 kg	Gabriel Dinette; Philippines	Chiranuwat Chamnanjan; Thailand	Gary Chow Weng Luen; Singapore

=== Women's Freestyle ===
Event	Gold	Silver	Bronze
50 kg	Đỗ Ngọc Linh; Vietnam	Aliah Rose Gavalez; Philippines	Sarah Novita; Indonesia
50 kg	Đỗ Ngọc Linh; Vietnam	Aliah Rose Gavalez; Philippines	Sabal Khaing; Myanmar
53 kg	Nguyễn Thị Mỹ Linh; Vietnam	Mutiara Ayuningtyas; Indonesia	Khin Su Khin; Myanmar
53 kg	Nguyễn Thị Mỹ Linh; Vietnam	Mutiara Ayuningtyas; Indonesia	Rea Cervantes; Philippines
57 kg	Nguyễn Thị Mỹ Trang; Vietnam	Mutoharoh; Indonesia	Thaint Thaint Thu Thae; Myanmar
57 kg	Nguyễn Thị Mỹ Trang; Vietnam	Mutoharoh; Indonesia	Sriprapa Tho-Kaew; Thailand
62 kg	Nguyễn Thị Mỹ Hạnh; Vietnam	Arian Carpio; Philippines	Kharisma Tantri Herlina; Indonesia
62 kg	Nguyễn Thị Mỹ Hạnh; Vietnam	Arian Carpio; Philippines	Salinee Srisombat; Thailand
