= Swimming at the 2025 SEA Games – Men's 100 metre freestyle =

Men's 100 metre freestyle at the 2025 SEA Games
- Venue: SAT Swimming Pool
- Date: 10 December
- Competitors: 12 from 7 nations
- Winning time: 48.65

Medalists
gold medal	Mikkel Lee	Singapore
silver medal	Quah Zheng Wen	Singapore
bronze medal	Trần Văn Nguyễn Quốc	Vietnam

The men's 100 metre freestyle event at the 2025 SEA Games took place on 10 December 2025 at the SAT Swimming Pool in Bangkok, Thailand.

== Schedule ==
All times are Indochina Standard Time (UTC+07:00)

Date	Time	Event
Wednesday, 10 December 2025	9:00	Heats
Wednesday, 10 December 2025	18:00	Final

== Records ==
Prior to this competition, the existing world, Asian, and Southeast Asian Games records were as follows.

World Record	Pan Zhanle (CHN)	46.40	Paris, France	31 July 2024
Asian Record	Pan Zhanle (CHN)	46.40	Paris, France	31 July 2024
Games Record	Joseph Schooling (SGP)	48.58	Singapore	7 June 2015

== Results ==
=== Heats ===
Rank	Heat	Swimmer	Nationality	Time	Notes
1	2	Mikkel Lee	Singapore	50.04	
2	2	Pongpanod Trithan	Thailand	50.46	
3	2	Luong Jérémie Loïc Nino	Vietnam	50.63	
4	2	Trần Văn Nguyễn Quốc	Vietnam	50.85	
5	1	Arvin Shaun Singh Chahal	Malaysia	50.89	
6	1	Quah Zheng Wen	Singapore	50.97	
7	1	Lim Yin Chuen	Malaysia	51.08	
8	1	Joe Kurniawan	Indonesia	51.34	
9	2	Kevin Prayitno	Indonesia	51.41	
10	1	Kittapart Kaewmart	Thailand	52.26	
11	2	Phone Pyae Han	Myanmar	54.49	
12	2	Jolanio Guterres	Timor-Leste	1:13.29	

=== Final ===
Rank	Swimmer	Nationality	Time	Notes
1st place, gold medalist(s)	Mikkel Lee	Singapore	48.65	
2nd place, silver medalist(s)	Quah Zheng Wen	Singapore	49.45	
3rd place, bronze medalist(s)	Trần Văn Nguyễn Quốc	Vietnam	50.02	
4	Luong Jérémie Loïc Nino	Vietnam	50.05	
5	Pongpanod Trithan	Thailand	50.38	
6	Arvin Shaun Singh Chahal	Malaysia	50.40	
7	Lim Yin Chuen	Malaysia	50.54	
8	Joe Kurniawan	Indonesia	50.99	
