= Swimming at the 2025 SEA Games – Men's 100 metre breaststroke =

Men's 100 metre breaststroke at the 2025 SEA Games
- Venue: SAT Swimming Pool
- Date: 11 December
- Competitors: 10 from 7 nations
- Winning time: 1:01.46

Medalists
gold medal	Phạm Thanh Bảo	Vietnam
silver medal	Chun Ho Chan	Singapore
bronze medal	Maximillian Ang Wei	Singapore

The men's 100 metre breaststroke event at the 2025 SEA Games took place on 11 December 2025 at the SAT Swimming Pool in Bangkok, Thailand.

== Schedule ==
All times are Indochina Standard Time (UTC+07:00)

Date	Time	Event
Wednesday, 11 December 2025	9:28	Heats
Wednesday, 11 December 2025	19:02	Final

== Records ==
Prior to this competition, the existing world, Asian, and Southeast Asian Games records were as follows.

World Record	Adam Peaty (USA)	56.88	Gwangju, South Korea	20 June 2022
Asian Record	Qin Haiyang (CHN)	57.69	Fukuoka, Japan	24 July 2023
Games Record	Phạm Thanh Bảo (VIE)	1:00.97	Phnom Penh, Cambodia	7 May 2023

== Results ==
=== Heats ===
Rank	Heat	Lane	Swimmer	Nationality	Time	Notes
1	1	4	Chan Chun Ho	Singapore	1:02.21	Q
2	2	3	Maximillian Ang	Singapore	1:02.52	Q
3	2	4	Phạm Thanh Bảo	Vietnam	1:03.16	Q
4	2	6	Rachasil Mahamongkol	Thailand	1:03.27	Q
5	1	5	Muhammad Dwiky Raharjo	Indonesia	1:03.53	Q
6	2	5	Andrew Goh	Malaysia	1:03.75	Q
7	1	3	Thanonchai Janruksa	Thailand	1:04.63	Q
8	1	2	Steven Insixiengmay	Laos	1:04.76	Q
9	1	6	Khant Phone Min	Myanmar	1:12.39	R
10	2	7	Thu Lin Myat	Myanmar	1:12.90	R

=== Final ===
Rank	Lane	Swimmer	Nationality	Time	Notes
1st place, gold medalist(s)	3	Phạm Thanh Bảo	Vietnam	1:01.43	
2nd place, silver medalist(s)	4	Chan Chun Ho	Singapore	1:01.72	
3rd place, bronze medalist(s)	5	Maximillian Ang	Singapore	1:02.35	
4	2	Muhammad Dwiky Raharjo	Indonesia	1:02.61	
5	7	Andrew Goh	Malaysia	1:03.24	
6	6	Rachasil Mahamongkol	Thailand	1:03.45	
7	8	Steven Insixiengmay	Laos	1:04.61	
8	1	Thanonchai Janruksa	Thailand	1:04.85	
