= Gymnastics at the 2025 SEA Games =

- Venue: Gymnasium 5, Thammasat University
- Location: Khlong Luang, Pathum Thani, Thailand
- Dates: 10–19 December 2025

Gymnastics competitions at the 2025 SEA Games took place at Gymnasium 5, Thammasat University Rangsit Campus in Khlong Luang, Pathum Thani, from 10 to 19 December 2025.

== Medal table ==
* Host nation (Thailand)

Rank	Nation	Gold	Silver	Bronze	Total
1	Thailand*	6	2	3	11
2	Malaysia	4	3	3	10
3	Vietnam	4	1	1	6
4	Philippines	3	2	7	12
5	Indonesia	1	2	1	4
6	Singapore	0	4	1	5
Totals (6 entries)		18	14	16	48

== Medalists ==
=== Artistic ===
Men

Event	Gold		Silver		Bronze	
Floor	Tikumporn Surintornta; Thailand	14.000	Luqman Al Hafiz Zulfa; Malaysia	12.865	Justine Ace De Leon; Philippines	12.500
Pommel horse	Đặng Ngọc Xuân Thiện; Vietnam	14.367	Asher Pua; Singapore	13.100	Muhammad Sharul Aimy; Malaysia	12.267
Horizontal bar	Abiyurafi; Indonesia	13.400	shared gold	N/A	Đinh Phương Thành; Vietnam	13.133
Horizontal bar	Weerapat Chuaisom; Thailand	13.400	shared gold	N/A	Đinh Phương Thành; Vietnam	13.133
Parallel bars	Đinh Phương Thành; Vietnam	12.900	Satria Tri Wira Yudha; Indonesia	12.633	Fuga Nomura; Thailand	12.167
Vault	Muhammad Sharul Aimy; Malaysia	13.833	shared gold	N/A	Tikumporn Surintornta; Thailand	13.717
Vault	John Ivan Cruz; Philippines	13.833	shared gold	N/A	Tikumporn Surintornta; Thailand	13.717
Rings	Nguyễn Văn Khánh Phong; Vietnam	13.767	Muhammad Aprizal; Indonesia	12.900	Justine Ace De Leon; Philippines	12.700

Women

Event	Gold		Silver		Bronze	
Uneven bars	Rachel Yeoh Li Wen; Malaysia	13.300	Haylee Garcia; Philippines	12.233	Colleen Hong; Singapore	10.933
Vault	Aleah Finnegan; Philippines	13.433	Nguyễn Thị Quỳnh Như; Vietnam	13.400	Yeap Kang Xian; Malaysia	12.966
Balance beam	Yeap Kang Xian; Malaysia	13.233	Amanda Yap; Singapore	12.733	Aleah Finnegan; Philippines	12.467
Floor	Sasiwimon Mueangphuan; Thailand	13.367	Emma Yap; Singapore	12.633	Salsabilla Hadi Pamungkas; Indonesia	12.367

=== Rhythmic ===
Event	Gold		Silver		Bronze	
Individual all-around	Jasmine Ramilo; Philippines	102.180	Mikayla Angeline Yang; Singapore	101.490	Ng Joe Ee; Malaysia	96.890
Individual all-around	Jasmine Ramilo; Philippines	102.180	Mikayla Angeline Yang; Singapore	101.490	Piyada Peeramatukorn; Thailand	96.890
1 types of apparatus (5)	Thailand; Rakkan Chaichonich; Pichayatida Ketsakul; Pornnutcha Jedthumrong; Puntita Thongsong; Chonthichakon Changomon	21.230	Malaysia; Valerie Ng Zi Yi; Bernice See Qin Nin; Syamimi Amalia Shahrizam; Carol Na Yuan Qi; Lim Xian Yar	17.660	Philippines; Shieldannah Sabio; Zchielorrae Cerezo; Francesca Denise Ganaden; Andrea Mae Emperado; Katrina Loretizo	10.300
2 types of apparatus (3+2)	Thailand; Rakkan Chaichonich; Pichayatida Ketsakul; Pornnutcha Jedthumrong; Puntita Thongsong; Chonthichakon Changomon	22.900	Malaysia; Valerie Ng Zi Yi; Bernice See Qin Nin; Syamimi Amalia Shahrizam; Carol Na Yuan Qi; Lim Xian Yar	22.500	Philippines; Shieldannah Sabio; Zchielorrae Cerezo; Francesca Denise Ganaden; Andrea Mae Emperado; Katrina Loretizo	13.270
Team	Malaysia; Valerie Ng Zi Yi; Bernice See Qin Nin; Syamimi Amalia Shahrizam; Carol Na Yuan Qi; Lim Xian Yar; Ng Joe Ee; Mavia Wong Weng Qin; Maia Ong Xiao Han; Lai Yun Jo	234.60	Thailand; Sikharee Sutthiragsa; Rakkan Chaichonich; Pichayatida Ketsakul; Pornnutcha Jedthumrong; Puntita Thongsong; Chonthichakon Changomon; Supidchaya Pinfun	222.36	Philippines; Shieldannah Sabio; Zchielorrae Cerezo; Francesca Denise Ganaden; Andrea Mae Emperado; Katrina Loretizo; Cristalin Zoe Valencia	174.42

=== Aerobic ===
Event	Gold		Silver		Bronze	
Mixed pair	Thailand; Chawisa Intakul; Chanokpon Jiumsukjai	18.367	Philippines; Arcenio Cadlos; Charmaine Dolar	17.600	not awarded	
Mixed group	Vietnam; Hoàng Gia Bảo; Phan Thị Uyên Nhi; Trương Ngọc Diễm Hằng; Nguyễn Chế Thanh; Đặng Chí Bảo	18.047	Thailand; Natthakit Teerasatorn; Chawisa Intakul; Chanokpon Jiumsukjai; Supatsorn Watcharaporn; Panyaroj Watthong	18.033	Philippines; Charmaine Dolar; Dorothy Grace Asuncion; Arcenio Cadlos; Enrico Ostia; Jhon Joeffrey Canones	17.533
