= Kickboxing at the 2025 SEA Games =

- Venue: Gymnasium Assumption University, Bang Sao Thong
- Location: Samut Prakan, Thailand
- Dates: 13–16 December 2025

Kickboxing competitions at the 2025 SEA Games took place at Assumption University in Samut Prakan, Bangkok, from 13 to 16 December 2025.

== Medal table ==
* Host nation (Thailand)

Rank	Nation	Gold	Silver	Bronze	Total
1	Thailand*	4	3	1	8
2	Vietnam	2	1	3	6
3	Indonesia	1	1	4	6
3	Philippines	1	1	4	6
5	Myanmar	0	2	0	2
6	Malaysia	0	0	2	2
7	Laos	0	0	1	1
7	Singapore	0	0	1	1
Totals (8 entries)		8	8	16	32

== Medalists ==
=== Ring ===
Event	Gold	Silver	Bronze
Men's low kick 51 kg	Phrommakhot Netipong; Thailand	Nguyen Dinh Minh Khue; Vietnam	Pareja Jansen; Philippines
Men's low kick 51 kg	Phrommakhot Netipong; Thailand	Nguyen Dinh Minh Khue; Vietnam	Soukkhaseum Sitthachak; Laos
Men's full contact 57 kg	Nguyen Quang Huy; Vietnam	Yawanophat Chainarong; Thailand	Camingawan Mikko; Philippines
Men's full contact 57 kg	Nguyen Quang Huy; Vietnam	Yawanophat Chainarong; Thailand	Enggar Bayu Saputra; Indonesia
Men's K-1 60 kg	Riyan Jepri Hamonangan; Indonesia	Kongtook Jakkrit; Thailand	Balangui Jomar; Philippines
Men's K-1 60 kg	Riyan Jepri Hamonangan; Indonesia	Kongtook Jakkrit; Thailand	Hoang Gia Dai; Vietnam
Women's low kick 48 kg	Bon As Zyra; Philippines	Manoban Jantakarn; Thailand	Nurul Aini Sevi; Indonesia
Women's low kick 48 kg	Bon As Zyra; Philippines	Manoban Jantakarn; Thailand	Bui Thi Yen Nhi; Vietnam
Women's K-1 52 kg	Hanphan Rattanaphon; Thailand	May Thazin Htoo; Myanmar	Dacquel Renalyn; Philippines
Women's K-1 52 kg	Hanphan Rattanaphon; Thailand	May Thazin Htoo; Myanmar	Putri Aprilia Eka; Indonesia

=== Tatami ===
Event	Gold	Silver	Bronze
Men's kick light 57 kg	Berrie Alexandrie Mangkorn; Thailand	Bayawon Whinny; Philippines	Duong Danh Hoat; Vietnam
Men's kick light 57 kg	Berrie Alexandrie Mangkorn; Thailand	Bayawon Whinny; Philippines	Ooi Kheng Xing; Malaysia
Men's point fighting 63 kg	Sukyik Pikanet; Thailand	Sitepu Ariyanta; Indonesia	Koh Alexavier Ming Jun; Singapore
Men's point fighting 63 kg	Sukyik Pikanet; Thailand	Sitepu Ariyanta; Indonesia	Vijayakumar Kueggen; Malaysia
Women's point fighting 50 kg	Hoang Thi Thuy Giang; Vietnam	Lin Sandar Htay; Myanmar	Kaewesri Sasisom; Thailand
Women's point fighting 50 kg	Hoang Thi Thuy Giang; Vietnam	Lin Sandar Htay; Myanmar	Maswara Andi Mesyara Jerni; Indonesia
