= Canoeing at the 2025 SEA Games =

Canoeing/Kayaking at the 2025 SEA Games
- Venue: Royal Thai Navy Rowing and Canoeing Training Center
- Location: Rayong, Thailand
- Dates: 10–12 December 2025

Canoeing and kayaking competitions at the 2025 SEA Games took place at Royal Thai Navy Rowing and Canoeing Training Center in Ban Chang, Rayong, from 10 to 12 December 2025.

== Medal table ==
* Host nation (Thailand)

Rank	Nation	Gold	Silver	Bronze	Total
1	Thailand*	10	1	1	12
2	Indonesia	2	5	6	13
3	Vietnam	2	2	2	6
4	Singapore	1	2	1	4
5	Myanmar	0	3	1	4
6	Malaysia	0	0	3	3
Totals (6 entries)		15	13	14	42

== Medalists ==
=== Slalom ===
Event	Gold	Silver	Bronze
Men's C-1	Yutthakan Chaidet; Thailand	Ade Yoan Sutanto; Indonesia	Ahmad Zikri Mohd Nor Arif; Malaysia
Men's K-1	Piyanath Koetsuk; Thailand	Krisna Septiana; Indonesia	Mohamad Nazrin Najib; Malaysia
Women's C-1	Atcharaporn Duanglawa; Thailand	Putu Santhi; Indonesia	Azlyn Farhana Azmi Tan; Malaysia
Women's K-1	Jaruwan Niamthong; Thailand	Kadek Sintha; Indonesia	Aung Po Po; Myanmar

=== Sprint ===
Event	Gold	Silver	Bronze
Men's C-1 500 m	Pitpiboon Mahawattanangkul; Thailand	Myo Hlaing Win; Myanmar	Phạm Hồng Quân; Vietnam
Men's C-2 200 m	Thailand; Pitpiboon Mahawattanangkul; Mongkhonchai Sisong	Myanmar; Htut Khaung Zaw; Myo Hlaing Win	Indonesia; Sofiyanto; Evans Monim
Men's C-4 200 m	Thailand; Pitpiboon Mahawattanangkul; Mongkhonchai Sisong; Wittaya Hongkaeo; Piyawat Chaithong	Myanmar; Kyaw Zaya; Htut Khaung Zaw; Myo Hlaing Win; Thant Zin Oo	Indonesia; Sofiyanto; Rudiansyah; Evans Monim; Muh. Burhan
Men's K-2 200 m	Thailand; Aditep Srichart; Praison Buasamrong	Indonesia; Mugi Harjito; Abdul Hamid	Vietnam; Nguyễn Minh Tuấn; Huỳnh Cao Minh
Men's K-4 200 m	Thailand; Nathaworn Waenphrom; Aditep Srichart; Methasit Sitthipharat; Praison Buasamrong	Singapore; Brandon Ooi Wei Cheng; Alden Ler; Titus Ching Heen Lok; Daniel Koh Teck Wai	Indonesia; Indra Hidayat; Dede Sunandar; Wandi; Subhi
Women's C-2 200 m	Vietnam; Ma Thị Thùy; Nguyễn Thị Hương	shared gold	Indonesia; Sella Monim; Herlin Aprilin Lali
Women's C-2 200 m	Thailand; Orasa Thiangkathok; Aphinya Sroichit	shared gold	Indonesia; Sella Monim; Herlin Aprilin Lali
Women's C-2 500 m	Vietnam; Diệp Thị Hương; Nguyễn Thị Hương	Thailand; Orasa Thiangkathok; Aphinya Sroichit	Indonesia; Sella Monim; Herlin Aprilin Lali
Mixed K-2 200 m	Indonesia; Subhi; Stevani Maysche Ibo	Vietnam; Võ Duy Thành; Đỗ Thị Thanh Thảo	Singapore; Alden Ler; Georgia Ng
Mixed K-2 500 m	Singapore; Lucas Teo Guang Yi; Stephenie Chen Jiexian	Vietnam; Võ Duy Thành; Đỗ Thị Thanh Thảo	Indonesia; Subhi; Ramla Baharuddin
Mixed K-4 500 m	Indonesia; Indra Hidayat; Ramla Baharuddin; Subhi; Stevani Maysche Ibo	Singapore; Stephenie Chen Jiexian; Brandon Ooi Wei Cheng; Alden Ler; Georgia Ng	Thailand; Pornnapphan Phuangmaiming; Nathaworn Waenphrom; Panwad Thongnim; Wichan Jaitieng
