= Swimming at the 2025 SEA Games – Men's 4 × 200 metre freestyle relay =

Men's 4x200 metre freestyle relay at the 2025 SEA Games
- Venue: SAT Swimming Pool
- Date: 11 December
- Competitors: 5 from 5 nations
- Winning time: 7:18.67

Medalists
gold medal	Trần Văn Nguyễn Quốc, Nguyễn Huy Hoàng, Nguyễn Viết Tường, Trần Hưng Nguyên	Vietnam
silver medal	Khiew Hoe Yean, Terence Ng, Lim Yin Chuen, Arvin Shaun Singh Chahal	Malaysia
bronze medal	Glen Lim, Ardi Zulhimi bin Mohamed Azman, Jonathan Tan, Quah Zheng Wen	Singapore

The men's 4 × 200 metre freestyle relay event at the 2025 SEA Games took place on 11 December 2025 at the SAT Swimming Pool in Bangkok, Thailand.

== Schedule ==
All times are Indochina Standard Time (UTC+07:00)

Date	Time	Event
Thursday, 11 December 2025	19:42	Final

== Records ==
Prior to this competition, the existing world, Asian, and Southeast Asian Games records were as follows.

World Record	United States; Michael Phelps (1:44.49); Ricky Berens (1:44.13); David Walters (1:45.47); Ryan Lochte (1:44.46)	6:58.55	Rome, Italy	31 July 2009
Asian Record	China; Ji Xinjie (1:46.22); Pan Zhanle (1:44.41); Wang Shun (1:46.08); Zhang Zhanshuo (1:44.20)	7:00.91	Singapore, Singapore	1 August 2025
Games Record	Vietnam; Nguyễn Hữu Kim Sơn (1:50.19); Hoàng Quý Phước (1:48.42); Nguyễn Huy Hoàng (1:48.66); Trần Hưng Nguyễn (1:49.04)	7:16.31	Hanoi, Vietnam	17 May 2022

== Results ==
=== Final ===
Rank	Lane	Swimmer	Nationality	Time	Notes
1st place, gold medalist(s)	3	Nguyễn Viết Tường (1:51.15); Nguyễn Huy Hoàng (1:49.70); Trần Văn Nguyễn Quốc (1:47.82); Trần Hưng Nguyên (1:50.00)	Vietnam	7:18.67	
2nd place, silver medalist(s)	2	Khiew Hoe Yean (1:48.48); Terence Ng (1:50.54); Lim Yin Chuen (1:50.61); Arvin Shaun Singh Chahal (1:49.87)	Malaysia	7:19.50	NR
3rd place, bronze medalist(s)	4	Glen Lim (1:50.05); Ardi Zulhimi bin Mohamed Azman (1:50.73); Jonathan Tan (1:50.46); Quah Zheng Wen (1:49.89)	Singapore	7:21.13	
4	5	Pongpanod Trithan (1:52.05); Ratthawit Thammananthachote (1:52.32); Tonnam Kanteemool (1:50.52); Surasit Thongdeang (1:49.85)	Thailand	7:24.74	NR
5	6	Made Aubrey Jaya (1:51.09); Mochammad Akbar Putra Taufik (1:52.89); Liquor Andoko (1:53.18); Nicholas Subagyo (1:50.01)	Indonesia	7:27.17	NR
