= Pétanque at the 2025 SEA Games =

- Venue: Valaya Alongkorn Rajabhat University under the Royal Patronage, Khlong Luang
- Location: Khlong Luang, Pathum Thani, Thailand
- Dates: 10–15 December 2025

Pétanque competitions at the 2025 SEA Games took place at Valaya Alongkorn Rajabhat University under the Royal Patronage in Khlong Luang, Pathum Thani, from 10 to 15 December 2025.

== Medal table ==
* Host nation (Thailand)

Rank	Nation	Gold	Silver	Bronze	Total
1	Thailand*	5	4	1	10
2	Vietnam	3	1	4	8
3	Laos	2	2	6	10
4	Indonesia	1	2	3	6
5	Philippines	0	1	4	5
6	Myanmar	0	1	2	3
7	Malaysia	0	0	2	2
Totals (7 entries)		11	11	22	44

== Medalists ==
=== Men ===
Event	Gold	Silver	Bronze
Singles	Andri Irawan; Indonesia	Southammavong Bountamy; Laos	Huỳnh Công Tâm; Vietnam
Singles	Andri Irawan; Indonesia	Southammavong Bountamy; Laos	Akkrachai Meekhong; Thailand
Doubles	Vietnam; Ngô Ron; Lý Ngọc Tài	Thailand; Thanawan Toosewha; Ratchata Khamdee	Laos; Maisanh Viphakon; Pexa Oulamanivong
Doubles	Vietnam; Ngô Ron; Lý Ngọc Tài	Thailand; Thanawan Toosewha; Ratchata Khamdee	Philippines; Jhasfer Camingal; Harry Micutuan
Triples	Thailand; Phongsakron Ainpu; Chareonwit Ketsattaban; Panukorn Roeksanit; Anuphon Phathan	Indonesia; Muhammad Muhlis Harliza; Bagas Syarief Hidayat; Dhoni Wahyu Krisbiantoro	Laos; Phonexay Douangmisy; Khalouy Phetvaly; Lar Mienmany; Nalonglith Vongdala
Triples	Thailand; Phongsakron Ainpu; Chareonwit Ketsattaban; Panukorn Roeksanit; Anuphon Phathan	Indonesia; Muhammad Muhlis Harliza; Bagas Syarief Hidayat; Dhoni Wahyu Krisbiantoro	Malaysia; Syed Afiq Fakhri Syed Ali; Khairul Amirul Zamrulhisham; Mohamad Muqri Arif Mohamad Sapiny
Shooting	Nguyễn Văn Dũng; Vietnam	Satria Topan; Indonesia	Mohamad Nuzul Azwan Ahmad Temizi; Malaysia
Shooting	Nguyễn Văn Dũng; Vietnam	Satria Topan; Indonesia	Phoudthala Keokannika; Laos

=== Women ===
Event	Gold	Silver	Bronze
Singles	Thepphakan Bovilak; Laos	Sirirat Khaithep; Thailand	Thị Hồng Thoa Thái; Vietnam
Singles	Thepphakan Bovilak; Laos	Sirirat Khaithep; Thailand	Anjani Dwi Apriliah; Indonesia
Doubles	Vietnam; Nguyễn Thị Thùy Kiều; Nguyễn Thị Thi	Thailand; Phantipha Wongchuvej; Sunitra Phuangyoo	Laos; Chindavone Sisavath; Aly Sengchanphet
Doubles	Vietnam; Nguyễn Thị Thùy Kiều; Nguyễn Thị Thi	Thailand; Phantipha Wongchuvej; Sunitra Phuangyoo	Philippines; Ma. Corazon Soberre; Cesiel Domenios
Triples	Thailand; Kantaros Choochuay; Cheerawan Kallaya; Thongsri Thamakord; Arisa Wadrongphak	Vietnam; Kim Thị Thu Thảo; Thạch Thị Anh Lan; Trình Thị Kim Thanh; Vũ Thị Thu	Laos; Nidavanh Douangmanichanh; Noneny Phanthaly; Boutsady Sengmany; Pinmany Vongsee
Triples	Thailand; Kantaros Choochuay; Cheerawan Kallaya; Thongsri Thamakord; Arisa Wadrongphak	Vietnam; Kim Thị Thu Thảo; Thạch Thị Anh Lan; Trình Thị Kim Thanh; Vũ Thị Thu	Malaysia; Jasnina Jasmine Johan Johnson; Thadis Henrera Vennice; Nur Durratul Sahira Yazit
Shooting	Lalita Chiaochan; Thailand	Khin Cherry Thet; Myanmar	Nguyễn Thị Hiền; Vietnam
Shooting	Lalita Chiaochan; Thailand	Khin Cherry Thet; Myanmar	Anni Saputri Nijamudin; Indonesia

=== Mixed ===
Event	Gold	Silver	Bronze
Double	Thailand; Nantawan Fueangsanit; Sarawut Sriboonpeng	Philippines; Ronnel Fuentes; Clyde Joy Baria	Malaysia; Ayzek Hakimi Safingan; Sharifah Afiqah Farzana Syed Ali
Double	Thailand; Nantawan Fueangsanit; Sarawut Sriboonpeng	Philippines; Ronnel Fuentes; Clyde Joy Baria	Laos; Noutmany Muenxay; Khenthong Ounnalom
(1 Women + 2 Men)	Thailand; Nadtaporn Ganjiang; Supanan Fueangsanit; Piyabut Chamchoi	Laos; Vilasack Lathsavong; Somsamay Xamounty; Chansamone Vongsavath	Indonesia; Andreas Saputra Suwajianto; Heriyanto; Warda Asifa
(1 Women + 2 Men)	Thailand; Nadtaporn Ganjiang; Supanan Fueangsanit; Piyabut Chamchoi	Laos; Vilasack Lathsavong; Somsamay Xamounty; Chansamone Vongsavath	Philippines; Gina Bacus; Julius Philip Bon; Mark Anthony Bon
(2 Women + 1 Men)	Laos; Boutta Neuthsavath; Noy Manythone; Manivanh Souliya	Thailand; Pranatsama Buacharoen; Wanchaloem Srimueang; Pataratida Meepak	Vietnam; Lê Thị Thu Mai; Phạm Lê Trung; Lê Thị Kim Ngân
(2 Women + 1 Men)	Laos; Boutta Neuthsavath; Noy Manythone; Manivanh Souliya	Thailand; Pranatsama Buacharoen; Wanchaloem Srimueang; Pataratida Meepak	Philippines; Jefrey Deiro; Nelia Lara; Rogelio Hermosa
