= Ju-jitsu at the 2025 SEA Games =

- Venue: Gymnasium, Rangsit University, Mueang Pathum Thani
- Location: Pathum Thani, Thailand
- Dates: 10–14 December 2025

Ju-jitsu competitions at the 2025 SEA Games took place at Gymnasium, Rangsit University in Mueang Pathum Thani, Pathum Thani, from 10 to 14 December 2025.

== Medal table ==
* Host nation (Thailand)

Rank	Nation	Gold	Silver	Bronze	Total
1	Thailand*	14	11	5	30
2	Philippines	2	1	8	11
3	Vietnam	1	3	16	20
4	Singapore	1	2	2	5
5	Malaysia	0	1	1	2
6	Indonesia	0	0	2	2
7	Laos	0	0	1	1
Totals (7 entries)		18	18	35	71

== Medalists ==
=== Duo ===
Event	Gold	Silver	Bronze
Men's duo classic	Thailand; Nawin Kokaew; Teeradet Polsuwan	Thailand; Charatchai Kitpongsri; Warut Netpong	Vietnam; Nguyễn Anh Tùng; Sài Công Nguyên
Men's duo classic	Thailand; Nawin Kokaew; Teeradet Polsuwan	Thailand; Charatchai Kitpongsri; Warut Netpong	Vietnam; Trình Kế Dương; Nguyễn Thanh Trà
Men's duo show	Thailand; Charatchai Kitpongsri; Warut Netpong	Thailand; Nawin Kokaew; Teeradet Polsuwan	Vietnam; Trần Hữu Tuân; Tô Đặng Minh
Men's duo show	Thailand; Charatchai Kitpongsri; Warut Netpong	Thailand; Nawin Kokaew; Teeradet Polsuwan	Vietnam; Trình Kế Dương; Nguyễn Thanh Trà
Women's duo classic	Thailand; Kanyarat Phaophan; Panyaporn Phaophan	Thailand; Kunsatri Kumsroi; Suphawadee Kaeosrasaen	Vietnam; Nguyễn Ngọc Bích; Phùng Thị Hồng Ngọc
Women's duo classic	Thailand; Kanyarat Phaophan; Panyaporn Phaophan	Thailand; Kunsatri Kumsroi; Suphawadee Kaeosrasaen	Philippines; Baby Jhen Buzon; Mariane Mariano
Women's duo show	Thailand; Kunsatri Kumsroi; Suphawadee Kaeosrasaen	Thailand; Kanyarat Phaophan; Panyaporn Phaophan	Vietnam; Nguyễn Ngọc Bích; Phùng Thị Hồng Ngọc
Women's duo show	Thailand; Kunsatri Kumsroi; Suphawadee Kaeosrasaen	Thailand; Kanyarat Phaophan; Panyaporn Phaophan	Laos; Mala Chanthalacksa; Koungking Bouddaxay
Mixed duo classic	Thailand; Warawut Saengsrirung; Lalita Yuennan	Vietnam; Trình Kế Dương; Nguyễn Ngọc Bích	Vietnam; Tô Đặng Minh; Phùng Thị Hồng Ngọc
Mixed duo classic	Thailand; Warawut Saengsrirung; Lalita Yuennan	Vietnam; Trình Kế Dương; Nguyễn Ngọc Bích	Thailand; Punnaphat Songsing; Piamsuk Satupap
Mixed duo show	Thailand; Kunsatri Kumsroi; Ratcharat Yimprai	Thailand; Warawut Saengsrirung; Lalita Yuennan	Vietnam; Trình Kế Dương; Nguyễn Ngọc Bích
Mixed team	Thailand; Sarin Soonthorn; Maria Elissavet Kokkoliou; Nutchaya Sugun; Naphat Mathupan; Sooknatee Suntra; Kunsatri Kumsroi; Suwijak Kuntong; Charatchai Kitpongsri; Kunathip Yea-On; Suchanard Leakkhew; Warut Netpong; Miyu Suzuki; Suphawadee Kaeosrasaen; Rakpol Polput; Thanaphat Polput; Warawut Saengsrirung; Kampanart Polput; Kanyarat Phaophan; Lalita Yuennan; Chanwit Aunjai; Pechrada Kacie Tan; Aksarapak Sirimak; Orapa Senatham; Rawin Kaewrawang; Natdanai Netthip; Kunnapong Hasdee; Nantita Namngam; Nuchanat Singchalad	Vietnam; Cấn Văn Thắng; Trần Hữu Tuân; Nguyễn Ngọc Bích; Trần Thị Thanh Hà; Nguyễn Thị Thanh Trúc; Vũ Thị Anh Thư; Hoàng Thị Nhật Quế; Đặng Đình Tùng; Tô Đặng Minh; Trần Hồng Ân; Vương Trần Hoài Thượng; Phùng Mũi Nhinh; Trình Kế Dương; Nguyễn Thanh Trà; Đào Hồng Sơn; Nguyễn Anh Tùng; Sài Công Nguyên; Lê Duy Thành; Nguyễn Tất Lộc; Hà Thị Anh Uyên; Nguyễn Thị Minh Vượng; Lê Thị Mỹ Hiền; Phùng Thị Hồng Ngọc; Nguyễn Thu Hương; Văn Sửu; Phạm Lê Hoàng Linh; Nguyễn Tiến Triển; Lê Minh Nhựt; Ngô Thị Thảo Vân; Lê Đức Cường	Singapore; Lin Kayleigh Lim Chang; Syazwani Binte Roslan Atiq; Jaslyn Ee Yin; Trinny Binte Kamarol Zaman Ervika; Jedd Shi Jie Tan; Noah Tian Ruin Lim; Noor Heeqmah; Abigail Rish Kanageswari; Aacus Hou Yu Ee; Ivy Jin Shan Seah; Nur Syazleen Binte Sazali Nayli; Matthew Natanael Sugiri; Salihin Bin Suran Muhammad; Danish Faiz
Mixed team			Philippines; Gay Mabel Arevalo; Denis Andrew Da Chavez; Christopher Manuel Gallego; Katryn Angela Saldajeno; Eunice Astrid Mojas; Godwin Langbayan

=== Fighting ===
Event	Gold	Silver	Bronze
Men's –62 kg	Suwijak Kuntong; Thailand	Naphat Mathupan; Thailand	Godwin Langbayan; Philippines
Men's –62 kg	Suwijak Kuntong; Thailand	Naphat Mathupan; Thailand	Đào Hồng Sơn; Vietnam
Men's –77 kg	Jedd Shi Jie Tan; Singapore	Aunjai Chanwit; Thailand	Artz Brilliant Perfecto; Indonesia
Men's –77 kg	Jedd Shi Jie Tan; Singapore	Aunjai Chanwit; Thailand	Đặng Đình Tùng; Vietnam
Women's –52 kg	Nuchanat Singchalad; Thailand	Phùng Mũi Nhinh; Vietnam	Nutchaya Sugun; Thailand
Women's –52 kg	Nuchanat Singchalad; Thailand	Phùng Mũi Nhinh; Vietnam	Steefanny Kinky Henandhita; Indonesia
Women's –63 kg	Orapa Senatham; Thailand	Suchanard Leakkhew; Thailand	Hà Thị Anh Uyên; Vietnam
Women's –63 kg	Orapa Senatham; Thailand	Suchanard Leakkhew; Thailand	Vũ Thị Anh Thư; Vietnam

=== Ne waza ===
Event	Gold	Silver	Bronze
Men's –62 kg	Suwijak Kuntong; Thailand	Naphat Mathupan; Thailand	Santino Luis Luzuriaga; Philippines
Men's –62 kg	Suwijak Kuntong; Thailand	Naphat Mathupan; Thailand	Cấn Văn Thắng; Vietnam
Men's –69 kg	Đặng Đình Tùng; Vietnam	Yman Xavier Baluyo; Philippines	Marc Alexander Lim; Philippines
Men's –69 kg	Đặng Đình Tùng; Vietnam	Yman Xavier Baluyo; Philippines	Kunnapong Hasdee; Thailand
Men's –77 kg	Aunjai Chanwit; Thailand	Paul Tian Zhi Lim; Singapore	Kampanart Polput; Thailand
Men's –77 kg	Aunjai Chanwit; Thailand	Paul Tian Zhi Lim; Singapore	Nguyễn Tất Lộc; Vietnam
Men's –85 kg	Dean Michael Roxas; Philippines	Aacus Hou Yu Ee; Singapore	Vito Luis Luzuriaga; Philippines
Men's –85 kg	Dean Michael Roxas; Philippines	Aacus Hou Yu Ee; Singapore	Phạm Lê Hoàng Linh; Vietnam
Women's –48 kg	Kimberly Anne Custodio; Philippines	Nutchaya Sugun; Thailand	Pechrada Kacie Tan; Thailand
Women's –48 kg	Kimberly Anne Custodio; Philippines	Nutchaya Sugun; Thailand	Hong Soo Jin; Singapore
Women's –57 kg	Nuchanat Singchalad; Thailand	Wong Joelle Ai; Malaysia	Cassandra Poyong; Malaysia
Women's –57 kg	Nuchanat Singchalad; Thailand	Wong Joelle Ai; Malaysia	Jenna Kaila Napolis; Philippines
Women's –63 kg	Orapa Senatham; Thailand	Maria Elissavet Kokkoliou; Thailand	Andrea Lois Lao; Philippines
Women's –63 kg	Orapa Senatham; Thailand	Maria Elissavet Kokkoliou; Thailand	Vũ Thị Anh Thư; Vietnam
