= Vietnam at the 2025 SEA Games =

Vietnam at the 2025 Southeast Asian Games
- IOC code: VIE
- NOC: Vietnam Olympic Committee
- Website: voc.org.vn (in Vietnamese) voc.org.vn (in English)

in Bangkok, Chonburi and Songkhla, Thailand 9–20 December 2025
- Competitors: 841 in 37 sports
- Flag bearers: Lê Thanh Thúy & Lê Minh Thuận
- Medals Ranked 3rd: Gold 87 Silver 81 Bronze 110 Total 278

Southeast Asian Games appearances (overview)
- 1989; 1991; 1993; 1995; 1997; 1999; 2001; 2003; 2005; 2007; 2009; 2011; 2013; 2015; 2017; 2019; 2021; 2023; 2025; 2027; 2029

Vietnam competed at the 33rd Southeast Asian (SEA) Games, which was held from 9 to 20 December 2025 in Bangkok & Chonburi in Thailand.

== Competitors ==
The following is the list of the number of competitors participating at the Games per sport/discipline.

Sport	Men	Women	Total
Athletics	19	31	50
Baseball	20	0	20
Football	23	23	46
Futsal	14	14	28
Golf	4	3	7
Tennis	5	5	10
Volleyball	14	14	28
Total	99	90	189

=== Medalists ===
Medal	Name	Sport	Event	Date
Gold	Nguyễn Thị Hương; Diệp Thị Hương	Canoeing	Women's C2 500m	10 Dec
Gold	Nguyễn Xuân Thành; Trần Hồ Duy; Lê Trần Kim Uyên; Nguyễn Phan Khánh Hân; Nguyễn Thị Y Bình; Trầm Đăng Khoa	Taekwondo	Mixed freestyle poomsae team	10 Dec
Gold	Trần Hưng Nguyên	Swimming	Men's 200 metre individual medley	10 Dec
Gold	Nguyễn Văn Dũng	Pétanque	Men's Tir de précision	10 Dec
Gold	Nguyễn Thị Phương; Nguyễn Ngọc Trâm; Hoàng Thị Thu Uyên; Bùi Ngọc Nhi	Karate	Women's Kata team	11 Dec
Gold	Nguyễn Hồng Trọng	Taekwondo	Men's -54kg	11 Dec
Gold	Phạm Văn Khánh Phong	Artistic Gymnastics	Men's rings	11 Dec
Gold	Đặng Ngọc Xuân Thiện	Artistic Gymnastics	Men's pommel horse	11 Dec
Gold	Đặng Đình Tùng	Ju-jitsu	Men's Ne-waza -69 kg	11 Dec
Gold	Bùi Thị Ngân	Athletics	Women's 1500m	11 Dec
Gold	Hồ Trọng Mạnh Hùng	Athletics	Men's triple jump	11 Dec
Gold	Trần Quốc Cường; Phan Minh Hạnh	Athletics	Men's Nage no Kata	11 Dec
Gold	Phạm Thanh Bảo	Swimming	Men's 100 metre breaststroke	11 Dec
Gold	Nguyễn Viết Tường; Nguyễn Huy Hoàng; Trần Văn Nguyễn Quốc; Trần Hưng Nguyên	Swimming	Men's 4x200 metre freestyle relay	11 Dec
Gold	Nguyễn Thị Hương; Ma Thị Thùy	Canoeing	Women's C2 200m	12 Dec
Gold	Nguyễn Tâm Quang; Lê Thị Mộng Tuyền	Shooting	Mixed 10m Air Rifle Team	12 Dec
Gold	Bạc Thị Khiêm	Taekwondo	Women's -73kg	12 Dec
Gold	Khuất Hải Nam	Karate	Men's Kumite -67 kg	12 Dec
Gold	Đinh Phương Thành	Artistic Gymnastics	Men's parallel bars	12 Dec
Gold	Ngô Ron; Lý Ngọc Tài	Pétanque	Men's Doubles	12 Dec
Gold	Nguyễn Thị Thi; Nguyễn Thị Thúy Kiều	Pétanque	Women's Doubles	12 Dec
Gold	Nguyễn Thị Ngọc	Athletics	Women's 400m	12 Dec
Gold	Nguyễn Quang Thuấn	Swimming	Men's 400m individual medley	12 Dec
Gold	Nguyễn Huy Hoàng	Swimming	Men's 1500m freestyle	12 Dec
Gold	Hoàng Thị Mỹ Tâm	Karate	Women's Kumite -61 kg	13 Dec
Gold	Nguyễn Thanh Trường	Karate	Men's Kumite -84 kg	13 Dec
Gold	Đinh Thị Hương	Karate	Women's Kumite -68 kg	13 Dec
Gold	Trần Thị Ánh Tuyết	Taekwondo	Women's -57kg	13 Dec
Gold	Nguyễn Thị Oanh	Athletics	Women's 5000m	13 Dec
Gold	Tạ Ngọc Tưởng; Nguyễn Thị Ngọc; Lê Ngọc Phúc; Nguyễn Thị Hằng	Athletics	Mixed 4x400m	13 Dec
Gold	Trịnh Thu Vinh; Nguyễn Thùy Trang; Triệu Thị Hoa Hồng	Shooting	Women's 10m Air pistol team	14 Dec
Gold	Trịnh Thu Vinh	Shooting	Women's 10m Air pistol	14 Dec
Gold	Đinh Thị Hương; Hoàng Thị Mỹ Tâm; Nguyễn Thị Diệu Ly; Nguyễn Thị Thu	Karate	Women's Kumite team	14 Dec
Gold	Trần Hoàng Khôi	Bowling	Men's tenpin singles	14 Dec
Gold	Phạm Thanh Bảo	Swimming	Men's 200 metre breaststroke	14 Dec
Gold	Nguyễn Thị Thu Thủy	Wushu	Women's sanda -60 kg	15 Dec
Gold	Trương Văn Chưởng	Wushu	Men's sanda -70 kg	15 Dec
Gold	Nguyễn Thị Oanh	Athletics	Women's 5000m	15 Dec
Gold	Nguyễn Trung Cường	Athletics	Men's 3000m steeplechase	15 Dec
Gold	Quách Thị Lan	Athletics	Women's 400 m hurdles	15 Dec
Gold	Lê Thị Hiền; Dư Thị Bông; Hà Thị Vui; Phạm Thị Ngọc Anh	Rowing	Women's Coxless four	16 Dec
Gold	Nguyễn Thị Oanh	Athletics	Women's 3000m steeplechase	16 Dec
Gold	Bùi Thị Kim Anh	Athletics	Women's high jump	16 Dec
Gold	Trần Thị Loan	Athletics	Women's long jump	16 Dec
Gold	Nguyễn Quang Huy	Kickboxing	Men's Full contact -57 kg	16 Dec
Gold	Hoàng Thị Thùy Giang	Kickboxing	Women's Point fighting -50 kg	16 Dec
Gold	Hoàng Thị Minh Hạnh; Nguyễn Thị Hằng; Lê Thị Tuyết Mai; Nguyễn Thị Ngọc	Athletics	Women's 4×400 m relay	16 Dec
Gold	Bùi Nguyễn Hoa Tranh; Choi Minh Châu; Đỗ Kỳ Duyên; Nguyễn Diệu Linh; Nguyễn Thanh Duyên; Nguyễn Thị Huyền Trang	Athletics	Women's Arena of Valor	16 Dec
Gold	Hồ Thị Duy	Rowing	Women's Lightweight single sculls	17 Dec
Gold	Hoàng Văn Đạt; Nguyễn Phú	Rowing	Men's Lightweight doubles	17 Dec
Gold	Bùi Thị Thu Hiền; Nguyễn Văn Giang; Đinh Thị Hảo; Phạm Thị Huệ	Rowing	Women's Quadruple sculls	17 Dec
Gold	Nguyễn Thùy Dung; Nguyễn Thùy Trang; Trịnh Thu Vinh	Shooting	Women's 25 m pistol team	17 Dec
Gold	Trịnh Thu Vinh	Shooting	Women's 25 m pistol	17 Dec
Gold	Nguyễn Tấn Sang	Pencak Silat	Men's Class G (75–80 kg)	17 Dec
Gold	Nguyễn Duy Tuyến	Pencak Silat	Men's Class I (85–90 kg)	17 Dec
Gold	Trần Hải Yến; Hà Thị Thu Huệ; Hoàng Thị Lan Anh; Nguyễn Thanh Huyền; Mai Thị Trang; Đỗ Thị Huyền Trang; Đỗ Thị Như Quỳnh; Nguyễn Thị Ánh Tuyết; Phùng Thị Linh Trang; Hà Thị Hạnh; Đàm Thị Thanh Huyền; Phạm Thị Loan; Huỳnh Gia Mỹ; Nguyễn Ngọc Thảo Vy; Nguyễn Thị Bích Thảo; Phùng Thị Ánh	Handball	Women's indoor	17 Dec
Gold	Nguyễn Công Mạnh	Wrestling	Men's Greco-roman -77 kg	17 Dec
Gold	Nghiêm Đình Hiếu	Wrestling	Men's Greco-roman -87 kg	17 Dec
Gold	Nguyễn Minh Hiếu	Wrestling	Men's Greco-roman -97 kg	17 Dec
Gold	Nguyễn Minh Hiếu	Wrestling	Men's Greco-roman -97 kg	17 Dec
Gold	Trần Đình Thắng	Weightlifting	Men's +94 kg	17 Dec
Gold	Nguyễn Thị Chiều	Muaythai	Women's -57 kg	17 Dec
Gold	Nguyễn Thị Phương Hậu	Muaythai	Women's -60 kg	17 Dec
Gold	Nguyễn Phước Đến	Fencing	Men's Individual épée	17 Dec
Gold	Nguyễn Xuân Lợi	Fencing	Men's Individual sabre	17 Dec
Gold	Trần Thị Hải Yến; Ngô Nguyễn Thùy Linh; Nguyễn Thị Vân Anh; Trần Thị Thùy Trang; A Dắt Rin Tô; Nguyễn Phương Anh; Trần Nguyệt Vi; Lê Thị Thanh Ngân; Biện Thị Hằng; Trần Thị Thu Xuân; K'Thủa; Đinh Thị Ngọc Hân; Lâm Thị Xuân	Futsal	Women's futsal	18 Dec
Gold	Nguyễn Lê Hoàng Vũ; Nguyễn Anh Trí; Phạm Tiến Sản	Triathlon	Men's Duathlon relay	18 Dec
Gold	Nguyễn Thị Mỹ Hạnh	Wrestling	Women's Freestyle -62 kg	18 Dec
Gold	Đỗ Ngọc Linh	Wrestling	Women's Freestyle -50 kg	18 Dec
Gold	Nguyễn Thị Mỹ Trang	Wrestling	Women's Freestyle -58 kg	18 Dec
Gold	Nguyễn Thị Mỹ Linh	Wrestling	Women's Freestyle -53 kg	18 Dec
Gold	Vietnam	Dragon boat	Women's 10-seater 200 m	18 Dec
Gold	Nguyễn Hoàng Lân; Nguyễn Văn Lý; Vương Minh Châu; Ngô Thanh Long	Sepak Takraw	Men's Quadrant	18 Dec
Gold	Trần Trung Kiên; Nguyễn Lê Phát; Phạm Lý Đức; Nguyễn Hiểu Minh; Nguyễn Đức Anh; Nguyễn Thái Sơn; Nguyễn Đình Bắc; Nguyễn Thái Quốc Cường; Nguyễn Quốc Việt; Lê Văn Thuận; Khuất Văn Khang; Nguyễn Xuân Bắc; Nguyễn Tân; Lê Viktor; Đặng Tuấn Phong; Nguyễn Nhật Minh; Nguyễn Phi Hoàng; Nguyễn Công Phương; Nguyễn Ngọc Mỹ; Võ Anh Quân; Phạm Minh Phúc; Nguyễn Thanh Nhàn; Cao Văn Bình	Football	Men's Football	18 Dec
Silver	Nguyễn Trọng Phúc; Trịnh Thị Kim Hà	Taekwondo	Mixed regcognized poomsae pair	10 Dec
Silver	Phụng Mùi Nhình	Ju-jitsu	Women's Fighting -52 kg	10 Dec
Silver	Võ Thị Mỹ Tiên	Swimming	Women's 200m butterfly	10 Dec
Silver	Võ Duy Thành; Đỗ Thị Thanh Thảo	Canoeing	Mixed K2 500m	10 Dec
Silver	Võ Duy Thành; Đỗ Thị Thanh Thảo	Canoeing	Mixed K2 200m	11 Dec
Silver	Mai Thị Bích Trâm; Vũ Hoàng Khánh Ngọc	Judo	Women's Ju No Kata	11 Dec
Silver	Nguyễn Thị Quỳnh Như	Artistic Gymnastics	Women's vault	11 Dec
Silver	Nguyễn Khánh Linh	Athletics	Women's 1500m	11 Dec
Silver	Chu Văn Đức	Karate	Men's -55 kg	12 Dec
Silver	Nguyễn Thị Diệu Ly	Karate	Women's Kumite -55 kg	12 Dec
Silver	Trần Đoàn Quỳnh Nam	Artistic Gymnastics	Women's balance beam	12 Dec
Silver	Nguyễn Hoàng Thành	Judo	Men's -55 kg	12 Dec
Silver	Đinh Công Khoa	Taekwondo	Men's -58 kg	12 Dec
Silver	Tạ Ngọc Tưởng	Athletics	Men's 400m	12 Dec
Silver	Trần Hưng Nguyên	Swimming	Men's 400m individual medley	12 Dec
Silver	Mai Trần Tuấn Anh	Swimming	Men's 1500m freestyle	12 Dec
Silver	Trịnh Kế Dương; Nguyễn Ngọc Bích	Ju-jitsu	Mixed Duo classic	12 Dec
Silver	Phí Thanh Thảo; Lê Thị Mộng Tuyền; Nguyễn Thị Thảo	Shooting	Women's 10m rifle team	13 Dec
Silver	Võ Văn Hiền	Karate	Men's Kumite -75 kg	13 Dec
Silver	Nguyễn Thị Loan	Taekwondo	Women's -54 kg	13 Dec
Silver	Nguyễn Hoài Hương	Weightlifting	Women's -53 kg	13 Dec
Silver	Trần Văn Nguyễn Quốc	Swimming	Men's 200 metre freestyle	13 Dec
Silver	Lê Thị Tuyết	Athletics	Women's 5000m	13 Dec
Silver	Bảo Khoa; Đào Thiên Hải; Võ Thành Ninh; Vũ Hoàng Gia Bảo; Trần Quốc Dũng; Phạm Thanh Phương Thảo	Chess	Mixed Maruk standard team	13 Dec
Silver	Nguyễn Thùy Trang	Shooting	Women's 10m Air pistol	14 Dec
Silver	Hoàng Thị Thu Thảo; Vũ Thị Vân Anh; Nguyễn Thị Yến; Nguyễn Thị Khánh Ly; Trần Thị Ngọc Yến; Nguyễn Thị Ngọc Huyền; Lê NGọc Tuyết; Nguyễn Thị My; Trần Thị Hồng Nhung; Nguyễn Thị Thu Trang; Ngô Thị Ngọc Quỳnh; Lê Thị Tú Trinh	Sepak takraw	Women's team	14 Dec
Silver	Lại Công Minh; Phạm Quang Huy; Nguyễn Đình Thành	Shooting	Men's 10m Air pistol team	14 Dec
Silver	Nguyễn Anh Minh	Golf	Men's individual	14 Dec
Silver	Trần Văn Nguyễn Quốc; Trần Hưng Nguyên; Lương Jérémie Loïc Nino; Nguyễn Viết Tường	Swimming	Men's 4x100 metre freestyle relay	14 Dec
Silver	Nguyễn Anh Tú; Đinh Anh Hoàng; Nguyễn Đức Tuân	Table tennis	Men's team	14 Dec
Silver	Nguyễn Hoàng Hiệp; Phan Tấn Sang; Lê Anh Tuấn; Nguyễn Quý Duy	Esports	EA Sports FC Online	14 Dec
Silver	Trịnh Thu Vinh; Phạm Quang Huy	Shooting	Mixed 10m Air pistol team	15 Dec
Silver	Nguyễn Thị Thủy Tiên	Weightlifting	Women's -63 kg	15 Dec
Silver	Lê Thị Tuyết	Athletics	Women's 10000m	15 Dec
Silver	Nguyễn Thị Thu Hà	Athletics	Women's 800m	15 Dec
Silver	Nguyễn Đức Sơn	Athletics	Men's 400m hurdles	15 Dec
Silver	Phùng Thị Huệ; Lê Thị Cẩm Tú; Kha Thanh Trúc; Hà Thị Thu	Athletics	Women's 4x100m relay	15 Dec
Silver	Trần Văn Nguyễn Quốc	Swimming	Men's 400 metre freestyle	15 Dec
Silver	Dương Văn Hoàng Quy	Swimming	Men's 200 metre butterfly	15 Dec
Silver	Võ Thị Mỹ Tiên	Swimming	Women's 800 metre freestyle	15 Dec
Silver	Kim Thị Thu Thảo; Thạch Thị Anh Lan; Trình Thị Kim Thanh; Vũ Thị Thu	Pétanque	Women's triple	15 Dec
Silver	Đặng Thị Kim Thanh; Trần Thị Thanh Thúy; Bùi Thị Ánh Thảo; Lê Thanh Thúy; Nguyễn Thị Uyên; Lê Như Anh; Hoàng Thị Kiều Trinh; Nguyễn Khánh Đang; Võ Thị Kim Thoa; Vi Thị Như Quỳnh; Lưu Thị Huệ; Đoàn Thị Lâm Oanh; Lê Thị Yến; Trần Thị Bích Thủy	Volleyball	Women's indoor volleyball	15 Dec
Silver	Đặng Trần Phương Nhi	Wushu	Women's Nanquan/Nangun/Nandao combined	15 Dec
Silver	Triệu Hoàng Long; Bùi Văn Hoàn; Nguyễn Văn Hà, Nguyễn Hữu Thành	Rowing	Men's Lightweight quadruple sculls	16 Dec
Silver	Nguyễn Quốc Toàn	Weightlifting	Men's 88 kg	16 Dec
Silver	Đoàn Thị Hồng Nhung; Trần Thị Mộng Thu; Phạm Thanh Phương Thảo; Cao Minh Trang	Chess	Women's ASEAN chess rapid team	16 Dec
Silver	Nguyễn Đình Minh Khuê	Kickboxing	Men's Low kick -50 kg	16 Dec
Silver	Đoàn Thu Hằng	Athletics	Women's 3000 m steeplechase	16 Dec
Silver	Hoàng Thanh Giang	Athletics	Women's Heptathlon	16 Dec
Silver	Trần Nhật Hoàng; Tạ Ngọc Tưởng; Vũ Ngọc Khánh; Lê Ngọc Phúc	Athletics	Men's 4×400 m relay	16 Dec
Silver	Dương Thị Hải Quyền	Pencak silat	Women's Class B (50–55 kg)	17 Dec
Silver	Vũ Đức Hùng	Pencak silat	Men's Class F (70–75 kg)	17 Dec
Silver	Pha Si Rô	Weightlifting	Women's +77 kg	17 Dec
Silver	Lê Quốc Phong; Nguyễn Duy; Nguyễn Minh Đức	Archery	Men's Recurve team	17 Dec
Silver	Triệu Huyền Điệp	Archery	Women's Recurve individual	17 Dec
Silver	Dương Đức Bảo	Muaythai	Men's -48 kg	17 Dec
Silver	Phạm Ngọc Mẫn	Muaythai	Men's -63.5 kg	17 Dec
Silver	Bàng Quang Thắng	Muaythai	Men's -71 kg	17 Dec
Silver	Nguyễn Thanh Tùng	Muaythai	Men's -75 kg	17 Dec
Silver	Nguyễn Văn Quyết	Fencing	Men's Individual sabre	17 Dec
Silver	Nguyễn Thùy Trang	Shooting	Women's 25 m pistol	17 Dec
Bronze	Nguyễn Thị Kim Hà; Lê Ngọc Hân; Lê Trần Kim Uyên	Taekwondo	Women's regcognized poomsae team	10 Dec
Bronze	Phạm Hồng Quân	Canoeing	Men's C1 500m	10 Dec
Bronze	Phùng Thị Hồng Ngọc; Nguyễn Ngọc Bích	Ju-jitsu	Women's Duo show	10 Dec
Bronze	Sái Công Nguyên; Nguyễn Anh Tùng	Ju-jitsu	Men's Duo show	10 Dec
Bronze	Trần Hữu Tuấn; Tơ Đăng Minh	Ju-jitsu	Men's Duo show	10 Dec
Bronze	Đào Hồng Sơn	Ju-jitsu	Men's Fighting -62 kg	10 Dec
Bronze	Đặng Đình Tùng	Ju-jitsu	Men's Fighting -77 kg	10 Dec
Bronze	Vũ Thị Anh Thư	Ju-jitsu	Women's Fighting -63 kg	10 Dec
Bronze	Hà Thị Anh Uyên	Ju-jitsu	Women's Fighting -63 kg	10 Dec
Bronze	Nguyễn Quang Thuấn	Canoeing	Men's 200 metre individual medley	10 Dec
Bronze	Trần Văn Nguyễn Quốc	Canoeing	Men's 100 metre freestyle	10 Dec
Bronze	Nguyễn Thị Hiền	Pétanque	Women's Tir de précision	10 Dec
Bronze	Thái Thị Hồng Thoa	Pétanque	Women's singles	10 Dec
Bronze	Huỳnh Công Tâm	Pétanque	Men's singles	10 Dec
Bronze	Bảo Khoa; Đào Thiên Hải; Võ Thành Ninh; Vũ Hoàng Gia Bảo	Chess	Men's Maruk blitz team	10 Dec
Bronze	Nguyễn Khả Nhi; Võ Thị Mỹ Tiên; Nguyễn Thúy Hiền; Phạm Thị Vân	Swimming	Women's 4x100 m freestyle relay	10 Dec
Bronze	Sái Công Nguyên; Nguyễn Anh Tùng	Ju-jitsu	Men's Duo classic	11 Dec
Bronze	Trần Hữu Tuấn; Nguyễn Thanh Trà	Ju-jitsu	Men's Duo classic	11 Dec
Bronze	Phùng Thị Hồng Ngọc; Nguyễn Ngọc Bích	Ju-jitsu	Women's Duo classic	11 Dec
Bronze	Lê Hồng Phúc; Phạm Minh Đức; Giang Việt Anh; Phạm Minh Quân	Karate	Men's Kata team	11 Dec
Bronze	Nguyễn Thị Mai	Taekwondo	Women's 46kg	11 Dec
Bronze	Huỳnh Cao Minh; Nguyễn Minh Tuấn	Canoeing	Men's K2 200m	11 Dec
Bronze	Lường Đức Phước	Athletics	Men's 1500m	11 Dec
Bronze	Lê Thị Cẩm Dung	Athletics	Women's Discus throw	11 Dec
Bronze	Hà Thị Thu	Athletics	Women's 100 m	11 Dec
Bronze	Võ Thị Mỹ Tiên	Swimming	Women's 200m individual medley	11 Dec
Bronze	Phùng Thị Hồng Ngọc; Tơ Đăng Minh	Ju-jitsu	Mixed Duo classic	12 Dec
Bronze	Trịnh Kế Dương; Nguyễn Ngọc Bích	Ju-jitsu	Mixed Duo show	12 Dec
Bronze	Cấn Văn Thắng	Ju-jitsu	Men's Ne-waza -62 kg	12 Dec
Bronze	Nguyễn Tất Lộc	Ju-jitsu	Men's Ne-waza -77 kg	12 Dec
Bronze	VŨ Thị Anh Thư	Ju-jitsu	Women's Ne-waza -63 kg	12 Dec
Bronze	Phạm Lê Hoàng Linh	Ju-jitsu	Men's Ne-waza -85 kg	12 Dec
Bronze	Đinh Phương Thành	Artistic Gymnastics	Men's Horizontal bar	12 Dec
Bronze	Nguyễn Thị Thu	Karate	Women's -50 kg	12 Dec
Bronze	Trương Thị Kim Tuyền	Taekwondo	Women's -49kg	12 Dec
Bronze	Phạm Minh Bảo Kha	Taekwondo	Men's -80kg	12 Dec
Bronze	Lê Ngọc Phúc	Athletics	Men's 400m	12 Dec
Bronze	Kim Thị Huyền	Athletics	Women's Shot put	12 Dec
Bronze	Huỳnh Thị Mỹ Tiên	Athletics	Women's 100 m hurdles	12 Dec
Bronze	Võ Thị Mỹ Tiên	Swimming	Women's 400m freestyle	12 Dec
Bronze	Cao Văn Dũng; Phạm Thanh Bảo; Nguyễn Viết Tường; Lương Jérémie Loïc Nino	Swimming	4x100 m medley relay	12 Dec
Bronze	Lê Thị Mộng Tuyền	Shooting	Women's 10m rifle	13 Dec
Bronze	Lê Anh Tài	Judo	Men's -90 kg	13 Dec
Bronze	Vũ Thị Trang; Bùi Bích Phương	Badminton	Women's Doubles	13 Dec
Bronze	K' Dương	Weightlifting	Men's -60 kg	13 Dec
Bronze	Nguyễn Thị Thu Trang	Weightlifting	Women's -48 kg	13 Dec
Bronze	Vũ Thị Ngọc Hà	Athletics	Women's triple jump	13 Dec
Bronze	Nguyễn Thúy Hiền	Swimming	Women's 100m breastroke	13 Dec
Bronze	Nguyễn Khả Nhi; Nguyễn Thúy Hiền; Phạm Thị Vân; Võ Thị Mỹ Tiên	Swimming	Women's 4x200 metre freestyle relay	14 Dec
Bronze	Võ Thị Kim Ánh	Boxing	Women's -54 kg	14 Dec
Bronze	Lê Chúc An	Golf	Women's individual	14 Dec
Bronze	Nguyễn Anh Minh; Hồ Anh Huy; Nguyễn Tuấn Anh; Nguyễn Trọng Hoàng	Golf	Men's team	14 Dec
Bronze	Quàng Thị Tâm	Weightlifting	Women's -58 kg	14 Dec
Bronze	Nguyễn Đức Toàn	Weightlifting	Men's -71 kg	14 Dec
Bronze	Vietnam	Judo	Mixed team	14 Dec
Bronze	Nguyễn Thành Ngưng	Athletics	Men's 20 km race walk	14 Dec
Bronze	Bùi Thị Thu Hà	Athletics	Women's marathon	14 Dec
Bronze	Nguyễn Thị Thật	Cycling	Women's Criterium road	14 Dec
Bronze	Nguyễn Huy Hoàng	Swimming	Men's 400 metre freestyle	15 Dec
Bronze	Lê Thị Thu Mai; Phạm Lê Trung; Lê Thị Kim Ngân	Pétanque	2 Women + 1 Men	15 Dec
Bronze	Bùi Thị Ngân	Athletics	Women's 800m	15 Dec
Bronze	Lê Quốc Huy	Athletics	Men's 400m	15 Dec
Bronze	Phạm Văn Nghĩa	Athletics	Men's Long jump	15 Dec
Bronze	Nguyễn Thị Vân Anh; Phạm Thị Bích Ngọc	Rowing	Women's Double sculls	16 Dec
Bronze	Nguyễn Thị Vân Anh; Phạm Thị Bích Ngọc	Rowing	Women's Double sculls	16 Dec
Bronze	Nguyễn Minh Triết	Pencak silat	Men's Class D (60–65 kg)	16 Dec
Bronze	Vũ Văn Kiên	Pencak silat	Men's Class C (55–60 kg)	16 Dec
Bronze	Lê Văn Phước	Pencak silat	Men's Class A (45–50 kg)	16 Dec
Bronze	Nguyễn Đức Hậu	Pencak silat	Men's Class U45 (–45 kg)	16 Dec
Bronze	Bùi Đình Quyết	Pencak silat	Men's Class E (65–70 kg)	16 Dec
Bronze	Lê Thị Vân Anh	Pencak silat	Women's Class C (55–60 kg)	16 Dec
Bronze	Phạm Lê Xuân Lộc	Cycling	Men's Individual road race	16 Dec
Bronze	Hoàng Khánh Mai	Muaythai	Women's -45 kg	16 Dec
Bronze	Trần Xuân Dũng	Weightlifting	Men's -94 kg	16 Dec
Bronze	Phạm Thị Thu Hoài	Fencing	Women's Individual sabre	16 Dec
Bronze	Nguyễn Phương Kim	Fencing	Women's Individual épée	16 Dec
Bronze	Nguyễn Thị Phương	Weightlifting	Women's 77 kg	17 Dec
Bronze	Mai Khánh Hoàng	Muaythai	Men's -45 kg	17 Dec
Bronze	Lộc Thị Đào	Archery	Women's Recurve individual	17 Dec
Bronze	Nguyễn Minh Đức	Archery	Men's Recurve individual	17 Dec
Bronze	Đoàn Bá Tuấn Anh; Nguyễn Đức Tuân	Table tennis	Men's Doubles	17 Dec

== Athletics ==
Vietnam sent 45 sprinters to compete at the 2025 SEA Games.

Key

- Note–Ranks given for track events are within the athlete's heat only
- Q = Qualified for the next round
- q = Qualified for the next round as a fastest loser or, in field events, by position without achieving the qualifying target
- NR = National record
- GR = SEA Games record
- N/A = Round not applicable for the event
- Bye = Athlete not required to compete in round

=== Men's ===
Track and road events

Athlete	Event	Heats			Final	
Athlete	Event	Heat	Time	Rank	Time	Rank
Ngần Ngọc Nghĩa	100m					
Ngần Ngọc Nghĩa	200m					
Tạ Ngọc Tưởng	200m					
Lê Ngọc Phúc	400m					
Tạ Ngọc Tưởng	400m					
Lương Đức Phước	800m	—N/a				
Sầm Văn Đời	800m	—N/a				
Lương Đức Phước	1500m	—N/a				
Sầm Văn Đời	1500m	—N/a				
Nguyễn Trung Cường	5000m	—N/a				
Lê Tiến Long	5000m	—N/a				
Nguyễn Trung Cường	10000m	—N/a				
Lê Quốc Huy	400m hurdles					
Nguyễn Đức Sơn	400m hurdles					
Nguyễn Trung Cường	3000m steeplechase	—N/a				
Lê Tiến Long	3000m steeplechase	—N/a				
Lê Ngọc Phúc; Nguyễn Xuân Quang; Tạ Ngọc Tưởng; Trần Đình Sơn; Trần Nhật Hoàng; Vũ Ngọc Khánh	4 × 400m relay					
Hoàng Nguyên Thanh	Marathon	—N/a				
Nguyễn Thành Ngưng	20km race walk	—N/a				

Field events

Athlete	Event	Final	
Athlete	Event	Distance	Position
Vũ Đức Anh	High jump		
Phạm Văn Nghĩa	Long jump		
Trần Văn Diện	Long jump		
Hồ Trọng Mạnh Hùng	Triple jump		
Trần Văn Diện	Triple jump		

=== Women's ===
Track and road events

Athlete	Event	Heats			Final	
Athlete	Event	Heat	Time	Rank	Time	Rank
Hà Thị Thu	100m					
Hoàng Dư Ý	100m					
Hà Thị Thu	200m					
Lê Thị Cẩm Tú	200m					
Hoàng Thị Minh Hạnh	400m					
Nguyễn Thị Ngọc	400m					
Bùi Thị Ngân	800m	—N/a				
Nguyễn Thị Thu Hà	800m	—N/a				
Bùi Thị Ngân	1500m	—N/a				
Nguyễn Khánh Linh	1500m	—N/a				
Lê Thị Tuyết	5000m	—N/a				
Nguyễn Thị Oanh	5000m	—N/a				
Lê Thị Tuyết	10000m	—N/a				
Nguyễn Thị Oanh	10000m	—N/a				
Bùi Thị Nguyên	100m hurdles					
Huỳnh Thị Mỹ Tiên	100m hurdles					
Lê Thị Tuyết Mai	400m hurdles					
Quách Thị Lan	400m hurdles					
Đoàn Thu Hằng	3000m steeplechase	—N/a				
Nguyễn Thị Oanh	3000m steeplechase	—N/a				
Bùi Thị Nguyên; Hà Thị Thu; Hoàng Dư Ý Kha Thanh Trúc; Lê Thị Cẩm Tú; Phùng Thị Huệ	4 × 100m relay	—N/a				
Hoàng Thị Minh Hạnh; Lê Thị Tuyết Mai; Nguyễn Thị Hằng; Nguyễn Thị Ngọc; Quách Thị Lan	4 × 400m relay					
Bùi Thị Thu Hà	Marathon	—N/a				
Hoàng Thị Ngọc Hoa	Marathon	—N/a				
Nguyễn Thị Thanh Phúc	20km race walk	—N/a				
Thái Thị Kim Ngân	20km race walk	—N/a				

Field events

Athlete	Event	Final	
Athlete	Event	Distance	Position
Bùi Thị Kim Anh	High jump		
Dương Thị Thảo	High jump		
Hà Thị Thúy Hằng	Long jump		
Trần Thị Loan	Long jump		
Nguyễn Thị Hương	Triple jump		
Vũ Thị Ngọc Hà	Triple jump		
Kim Thị Huyền	Shotput		
Lê Thị Cẩm Dung	Discus throw		

Athlete	Event	100m H	HJ	SP	200 m	LJ	JT	800m	Total	Rank
Hoàng Thanh Giang	Heptathlon								pts	

=== Mixed ===
Team	Event	Final	
Team	Event	Time	Rank
Hoàng Thị Minh Hạnh; Lê Ngọc Phúc; Nguyễn Thị Hằng; Nguyễn Thị Ngọc; Tạ Ngọc Tưởng	4 × 400m relay		

== Badminton ==
Men

Player	Event	Round of 32	Round of 16	Quarter-finals	Semi-finals	Final	Rank
Player	Event	Opponent Score	Opponent Score	Opponent Score	Opponent Score	Opponent Score	Rank
Lê Đức Phát	Singles						
Nguyễn Hải Đăng	Singles						
	Doubles	—N/a					

Women

Player	Event	Quarterfinals	Semifinals	Final	Rank
Player	Event	Opposition Score	Opposition Score	Opposition Score	Rank
Nguyễn Thùy Linh	Singles				
Trần Thị Phương Thuý	Singles				
Phạm Thị Khánh; Phạm Thị Diệu Ly	Doubles				
Bùi Bích Phương; Vũ Thị Trang	Doubles				
Bùi Bích Phương; Nguyễn Thùy Linh; Phạm Thị Diệu Ly; Phạm Thị Khánh; Trần Thị Phương Thuý; Vũ Thị Trang	Team	Malaysia (MAS); L 1–3	Did not advance		

== Baseball ==
Team	Event	Group Stage							Final / BM	
Team	Event	Opposition Score	Opposition Score	Opposition Score	Opposition Score	Opposition Score	Opposition Score	Rank	Opposition Score	Rank
Vietnam men's	Men's tournament	Thailand; L 0–16	Malaysia; W 5–2	Laos; L 0–16	Singapore	Philippines	Indonesia			
Vietnam baseball5's	Baseball5's tournament	Thailand	Indonesia	Malaysia	—N/a					

== Basketball ==
Summary

Team	Event	Preliminary Round				Qualifications	Semifinals	Final / BM	
Team	Event	Opposition Score	Opposition Score	Opposition Score	Rank	Opposition Score	Opposition Score	Opposition Score	Rank
Vietnam men's	Men's 3x3	Philippines –	Laos –	Malaysia –		—N/a			
Vietnam women's	Women's 3x3	Thailand –	Laos –	Singapore –		—N/a			
Vietnam men's	Men's 5x5	Malaysia –	Philippines –	—N/a					
Vietnam women's	Women's 5x5	Indonesia –	Thailand –	—N/a					

=== 5×5 basketball ===
==== Men's tournament ====
Group play

Pos	Team	Pld	W	L	PF	PA	PD	Pts	Qualification
1	Philippines	2	2	0	161	125	+36	4	Advance to Semi-finals
2	Malaysia	2	1	1	147	146	+1	3	Qualification to Quarter-finals
3	Vietnam	2	0	2	130	167	−37	2	Qualification to Quarter-finals

Source: Basketball - 5x5 Schedule & Results

13 December 2025
11:30

Results

Vietnam	63–89	Malaysia
Scoring by quarter: 21−19, 11−22, 15−23, 16−25

Nimibutr Stadium, Bangkok

15 December 2025
11:30

Results

Philippines	78–67	Vietnam
Scoring by quarter: 16−21, 21−20, 24−19, 17−7
Pts: Erram 15; Rebs: Malonzo, Parks 8 Asts: Bolick 4		Pts: Tran, H. Nguyen 19; Rebs: Dierker 15; Asts: Tran 4

Nimibutr Stadium, Bangkok
Attendance: 500
Referees: Yuen Chun Yip (HKG), Suebpong Wichaiphin (THA), Nattapong Jontapa (THA)

==== Women's tournament ====
Group play

Pos	Team	Pld	W	L	PF	PA	PD	Pts	Qualification
1	Thailand (H)	2	2	0	149	101	+48	4	Advance to Semifinals
2	Indonesia	2	1	1	136	98	+38	3	Qualification to Quarterfinals
3	Vietnam	2	0	2	84	170	−86	2	Qualification to Quarterfinals

Source: Basketball - 5x5 Schedule & Results
(H) Hosts

13 December 2025
16:30

Results

Vietnam	38–81	Indonesia
Scoring by quarter: 7−21, 10−23, 12−19, 9−18

Nimibutr Stadium, Bangkok
Referees: Huang Yun-Hsuan (TPE), Mandy Ngieng Sing Tong (MAS), Michelle Chian Yie Tsen (SGP)

15 December 2025
16:30

Results

Thailand	89–46	Vietnam
Scoring by quarter: 21−13, 24−17, 21−5, 23−11

Nimibutr Stadium, Bangkok

== Boxing ==
=== Men's ===
Athlete	Event	Round of 16	Quarterfinals	Semifinals	Final	
Athlete	Event	Opposition Result	Opposition Result	Opposition Result	Opposition Result	Rank
Nguyễn Linh Phụng	Men's -48 kg					
Nguyễn Minh Cường	Men's -51 kg					
Trần Quang Lộc	Men's -54 kg					
Nguyễn Văn Đương	Men's -57 kg					
Nguyễn Đức Ngọc	Men's -69 kg					
Bùi Phước Tùng	Men's -75 kg					
Nguyễn Mạnh Cường	Men's -80 kg					

=== Women's ===
Athlete	Event	Round of 16	Quarterfinals	Semifinals	Final	
Athlete	Event	Opposition Result	Opposition Result	Opposition Result	Opposition Result	Rank
Ngô Ngọc Linh Chi	Women's -48 kg					
Nguyễn Thị Ngọc Trân	Women's -50 kg					
Võ Thị Kim Anh	Women's -54 kg					
Nguyễn Huyền Trân	Women's -57 kg					
Hà Thị Linh	Women's -60 kg					
Hoàng Ngọc Mai	Women's -70 kg					

== Football ==
Summary

Key:

- A.E.T – After extra time.
- P – Match decided by penalty-shootout.

Team	Event	Group Stage				Semifinal	Final / BM	
Team	Event	Opposition Score	Opposition Score	Opposition Score	Rank	Opposition Score	Opposition Score	Rank
Vietnam men's	Men's tournament	Laos; W 2–1	Malaysia; W 2–0	—N/a	1 Q	Philippines; W 2–0	Thailand; W 3–2 (a.e.t.)	1st place, gold medalist(s)
Vietnam women's	Women's tournament	Malaysia; W 7–0	Philippines; L 0–1	Myanmar; W 2–0	1 Q	Indonesia; W 5–0	Philippines; L 0–0 (a.e.t.); 5–6 (p)	2nd place, silver medalist(s)

=== Men's tournament ===
Team roster

Vietnam announced their 28-men preliminary squad on 21 November 2025. The final squad was announced on 30 November.

Head coach: (South Korea) Kim Sang-sik

No.	Pos.	Player	Date of birth (age)	Caps	Goals	Club
1	GK	Trần Trung Kiên	9 February 2003 (aged 22)	9	0	(Vietnam Football Federation) Hoàng Anh Gia Lai
2	FW	Nguyễn Lê Phát	12 January 2007 (aged 18)	3	0	(Vietnam Football Federation) Ninh Bình
3	DF	Phạm Lý Đức	14 February 2003 (aged 22)	10	1	(Vietnam Football Federation) Công An Hà Nội
4	DF	Nguyễn Hiểu Minh	5 August 2004 (aged 21)	15	3	(Vietnam Football Federation) PVF-CAND
5	DF	Nguyễn Đức Anh	May 16, 2003 (aged 22)	10	0	(Vietnam Football Federation) SHB Đà Nẵng
6	MF	Nguyễn Thái Sơn	13 July 2003 (aged 22)	29	1	(Vietnam Football Federation) Đông Á Thanh Hóa
7	FW	Nguyễn Đình Bắc	19 August 2004 (aged 21)	20	3	(Vietnam Football Federation) Công An Hà Nội
8	MF	Nguyễn Thái Quốc Cường	6 March 2004 (aged 21)	7	0	(Vietnam Football Federation) Công An HCMC
9	FW	Nguyễn Quốc Việt	4 May 2003 (aged 22)	37	8	(Vietnam Football Federation) Ninh Bình
10	FW	Lê Văn Thuận	15 July 2006 (aged 19)	10	2	(Vietnam Football Federation) Đông Á Thanh Hóa
11	MF	Khuất Văn Khang (captain)	11 May 2003 (aged 22)	37	4	(Vietnam Football Federation) Thể Công-Viettel
12	MF	Nguyễn Xuân Bắc	3 February 2003 (aged 22)	13	1	(Vietnam Football Federation) PVF-CAND
13	GK	Nguyễn Tân	16 July 2005 (aged 20)	2	0	(Vietnam Football Federation) Công An HCMC
14	MF	Lê Viktor	10 November 2003 (aged 22)	13	2	(Vietnam Football Federation) Hồng Lĩnh Hà Tĩnh
15	DF	Đặng Tuấn Phong	7 February 2003 (aged 22)	8	0	(Vietnam Football Federation) Thể Công-Viettel
16	DF	Nguyễn Nhật Minh	27 July 2003 (aged 22)	15	0	(Vietnam Football Federation) Hải Phòng
17	MF	Nguyễn Phi Hoàng	27 March 2003 (aged 22)	19	0	(Vietnam Football Federation) SHB Đà Nẵng
18	MF	Nguyễn Công Phương	3 June 2006 (aged 19)	7	1	(Vietnam Football Federation) Thể Công-Viettel
19	MF	Nguyễn Ngọc Mỹ	20 February 2004 (aged 21)	7	1	(Vietnam Football Federation) Đông Á Thanh Hóa
20	DF	Võ Anh Quân	7 May 2004 (aged 21)	12	0	(Vietnam Football Federation) PVF-CAND
21	MF	Phạm Minh Phúc	7 February 2004 (aged 21)	8	1	(Vietnam Football Federation) Công An Hà Nội
22	FW	Nguyễn Thanh Nhàn	28 July 2003 (aged 22)	25	3	(Vietnam Football Federation) PVF-CAND
23	GK	Cao Văn Bình	8 January 2005 (aged 20)	10	0	(Vietnam Football Federation) Sông Lam Nghệ An

Group play

Pos	Team	Pld	W	D	L	GF	GA	GD	Pts	Qualification
1	Vietnam	2	2	0	0	4	1	+3	6	Advance to knockout stage
2	Malaysia	2	1	0	1	4	3	+1	3	Advance to knockout stage
3	Laos	2	0	0	2	2	6	−4	0	

Source: Soccerway
Rules for classification: Group stage tiebreakers
3 December 2025
16:00

Laos	1–2	Vietnam
Khampane 33'	Report	Nguyễn Đình Bắc 28', 60'

Rajamangala Stadium, Bangkok (Note: Originally planned to be held in Tinsulanon Stadium, but moved to Rajamangala Stadium due to Cyclone Senyar hitting Songkhla province.)
Referee: Rustam Lutfullin (Uzbekistan)

11 December 2025
16:00

Vietnam	2–0	Malaysia
Nguyễn Hiểu Minh 11'; Phạm Minh Phúc 22'	Report

Rajamangala Stadium, Bangkok
Referee: Qasim Al-Hatmi (Oman)

Semi-finals

15 December 2025
15:30

Vietnam	2–0	Philippines
Lê Văn Thuận 89'; Nguyễn Thanh Nhàn 90+2'	Report

Rajamangala Stadium, Bangkok
Referee: Choi Hyun-jai (South Korea)

Gold medal match

18 December 2025
19:30

Thailand	2–3 (a.e.t.)	Vietnam
Yotsakorn B. 20'; Seksan 31'	Report	Nguyễn Đình Bắc 49' (pen.); Waris 60' (o.g.); Nguyễn Thanh Nhàn 96'

Rajamangala Stadium, Bangkok
Attendance: 17,736
Referee: Mooud Bonyadifard (Iran)

=== Women's tournament ===
Team roster

Vietnam announced their final squad on 1 December 2025.

Head coach: Mai Đức Chung

No.	Pos.	Player	Date of birth (age)	Caps	Goals	Club
14	GK	Trần Thị Kim Thanh	18 September 1993 (aged 32)	61	0	(Vietnam Football Federation) Ho Chi Minh City
20	GK	Khổng Thị Hằng	10 October 1993 (aged 32)	34	0	(Vietnam Football Federation) Than KSVN
1	GK	Quách Thu Em	15 August 1995 (aged 30)	0	0	(Vietnam Football Federation) Ho Chi Minh City
5	DF	Hoàng Thị Loan	6 February 1995 (aged 30)	49	3	(Vietnam Football Federation) Hanoi
6	DF	Nguyễn Thị Hoa	28 November 2000 (aged 25)	4	0	(Vietnam Football Federation) Hanoi
10	DF	Trần Thị Hải Linh	8 June 2001 (aged 24)	31	1	(Vietnam Football Federation) Hanoi
13	DF	Lê Thị Diễm My	6 March 1994 (aged 31)	30	0	(Vietnam Football Federation) Than KSVN
2	DF	Lương Thị Thu Thương	1 May 2000 (aged 25)	39	0	(Vietnam Football Federation) Than KSVN
22	DF	Nguyễn Thị Mỹ Anh	27 November 1994 (aged 31)	34	1	(Vietnam Football Federation) Thai Nguyen T&T
4	DF	Trần Thị Thu	15 January 1991 (aged 34)	46	2	(Vietnam Football Federation) Thai Nguyen T&T
15	DF	Trần Thị Duyên	28 December 2000 (aged 24)	14	1	(Vietnam Football Federation) Phong Phu Ha Nam
18	DF	Cù Thị Huỳnh Như	7 August 2000 (aged 25)	5	0	(Vietnam Football Federation) Ho Chi Minh City
17	DF	Trần Thị Thu Thảo	15 January 1993 (aged 32)	57	5	(Vietnam Football Federation) Ho Chi Minh City
3	DF	Nguyễn Thị Kim Yên	26 June 2002 (aged 23)	2	0	(Vietnam Football Federation) Ho Chi Minh City
21	MF	Ngân Thị Vạn Sự	29 April 2001 (aged 24)	43	11	(Vietnam Football Federation) Hanoi
19	MF	Nguyễn Thị Thanh Nhã	25 September 2001 (aged 24)	39	7	(Vietnam Football Federation) Hanoi
11	MF	Thái Thị Thảo	12 February 1995 (aged 30)	58	15	(Vietnam Football Federation) Hanoi
8	MF	Nguyễn Thị Trúc Hương	4 March 2000 (aged 25)	11	1	(Vietnam Football Federation) Than KSVN
23	MF	Nguyễn Thị Bích Thùy	1 May 1994 (aged 31)	81	20	(Vietnam Football Federation) Thai Nguyen T&T
12	FW	Phạm Hải Yến	9 November 1994 (aged 31)	92	54	(Vietnam Football Federation) Hanoi
16	FW	Nguyễn Thị Thúy Hằng	19 November 1997 (aged 28)	20	6	(Vietnam Football Federation) Than KSVN
7	FW	Ngọc Minh Chuyên	23 June 2004 (aged 21)	3	1	(Vietnam Football Federation) Thai Nguyen T&T
9	FW	Huỳnh Như	28 November 1991 (aged 34)	116	69	(Vietnam Football Federation) Ho Chi Minh City

Group play

Pos	Team	Pld	W	D	L	GF	GA	GD	Pts	Qualification
1	Vietnam	3	2	0	1	9	1	+8	6	Advance to knockout stage
2	Philippines	3	2	0	1	8	2	+6	6	Advance to knockout stage
3	Myanmar	3	2	0	1	5	3	+2	6	
4	Malaysia	3	0	0	3	0	16	−16	0	

Source: Soccerway
5 December 2025
18:30

Vietnam	7–0	Malaysia
Phạm Hải Yến 4', 26'; Nguyễn Thị Bích Thùy 23'; Trần Thị Hải Linh 36'; Thái Thị Thảo 48', 59', 78'	Report

Chonburi Stadium, Chonburi
Referee: Rawdha Almansoori (United Arab Emirates)

8 December 2025
18:30

Philippines	1–0	Vietnam
Ramirez 90+4'	Report

Chonburi Stadium, Chonburi
Referee: Gulshoda Saidqulova (Uzbekistan)

11 December 2025
16:00

Vietnam	2–0	Myanmar
Ngân Thị Vạn Sự 8'; Nguyễn Thị Bích Thùy 14'	Report

Chonburi Stadium, Chonburi
Referee: Esra'a Almbaidin (Jordan)

Semi-finals

14 December 2025
16:00

Vietnam	5–0	Indonesia
Nguyễn Thị Bích Thùy 28' (pen.), 80'; Phạm Hải Yến 49', 58'; Huỳnh Như 86'	Report

IPE Chonburi Stadium, Chonburi
Referee: Alesar Baddour (Syria)

Gold medal match

17 December 2025
19:30

Philippines	0–0 (a.e.t.)	Vietnam
	Report
Penalties
Guy (penalty scored); Pino (penalty scored); Long (penalty scored); Beard (penalty scored); Markey (penalty scored); Sawicki (penalty scored)	6–5	(penalty scored) Huỳnh Như; (penalty scored) Ngọc Minh Chuyên; (penalty scored) Nguyễn Thị Trúc Hương; (penalty scored) Hoàng Thị Loan; (penalty scored) Cù Thị Huỳnh Như; (penalty missed) Trần Thị Thu

Chonburi Stadium, Chonburi
Referee: Rebecca Durcau (Australia)

== Futsal ==
Summary

Key:

- A.E.T – After extra time.
- P – Match decided by penalty-shootout.

Team	Event	Group Stage					Semifinal	Final / BM	
Team	Event	Opposition Score	Opposition Score	Opposition Score	Opposition Score	Rank	Opposition Score	Opposition Score	Rank
Vietnam men's	Men's tournament	Malaysia; L 2–4	Indonesia; W 1–0	Thailand; L 1–2	Myanmar; W 4–2	—N/a			4
Vietnam women's	Women's tournament	Indonesia; W 3–1	Myanmar; W 4–2	—N/a		1 Q	Philippines; W 1–0	Indonesia; W 5–0	1st place, gold medalist(s)

=== Men's tournament ===
Team roster

Head coach: (Argentina) Diego Giustozzi

Vietnam announced their 20-men preliminary squad on 30 October 2025. The final squad was announced on 13 December 2025.

No.	Pos.	Player	Date of birth (age)	Caps	Goals	Club
	GK	Phạm Văn Tú	7 April 1997 (aged 28)			(Vietnam Football Federation) Thái Sơn Bắc
	GK	Trần Văn Lương	14 December 2003 (aged 22)			(Vietnam Football Federation) Thai Son Nam HCMC
	DF	Nhan Gia Hưng	13 July 2002 (aged 23)			(Vietnam Football Federation) Thai Son Nam HCMC
	DF	Đinh Công Viên	7 January 2002 (aged 23)			(Vietnam Football Federation) Sahako
	DF	Nguyễn Mạnh Dũng	9 June 1997 (aged 28)			(Vietnam Football Federation) Thai Son Nam HCMC
	DF	Phạm Đức Hòa	12 April 1991 (aged 34)			(Vietnam Football Federation) Thai Son Nam HCMC
	DF	Trần Quang Nguyên	12 January 2006 (aged 19)			(Vietnam Football Federation) Thái Sơn Bắc
	MF	Dương Ngọc Linh	20 May 1997 (aged 28)			(Vietnam Football Federation) Thai Son Nam HCMC
	MF	Vũ Ngọc Ánh	22 February 2004 (aged 21)			(Vietnam Football Federation) Thái Sơn Bắc
	MF	Trịnh Công Đại	16 March 2005 (aged 20)			(Vietnam Football Federation) Thái Sơn Bắc
	MF	Từ Minh Quang	1 November 1998 (aged 27)			(Vietnam Football Federation) Thái Sơn Bắc
	FW	Nguyễn Thịnh Phát	10 June 1997 (aged 28)			(Vietnam Football Federation) Thai Son Nam HCMC
	FW	Nguyễn Minh Trí	8 April 1996 (aged 29)			(Vietnam Football Federation) Thai Son Nam HCMC
	FW	Nguyễn Đa Hải	13 August 2005 (aged 20)			(Vietnam Football Federation) Thái Sơn Bắc

Group play

Pos	Team	Pld	W	D	L	GF	GA	GD	Pts	Final Result
1	Indonesia (C)	4	3	0	1	13	4	+9	9	Gold medal
2	Thailand (H)	4	3	0	1	13	8	+5	9	Silver medal
3	Malaysia	4	2	0	2	14	12	+2	6	Bronze medal
4	Vietnam	4	2	0	2	8	8	0	6	
5	Myanmar	4	0	0	4	4	20	−16	0	

Source: VFF
(C) Champions; (H) Hosts
16 December 2025
16:00

Malaysia	4–2	Vietnam
Harith Naim 4'; Syahir Iqbal Khan 7', 21'; Awaluddin Mat Nawi 18'	Report	Nguyễn Đa Hải 3'; Nguyễn Mạnh Dũng 37'

Nonthaburi Sports Complex Gymnasium, Nonthaburi
Referee: Sukhrob Sattorov (Tajikistan)

17 December 2025
16:00

Vietnam	1–0	Indonesia
Từ Minh Quang 11'	Report

Nonthaburi Sports Complex Gymnasium, Nonthaburi
Referee: Ahmad Al Daou (Lebanon)

18 December 2025
19:00

Vietnam	1–2	Thailand
Nguyễn Đa Hải 30'	Report	Muhammad Osamanmusa 15'; Itticha Praphaphan 29'

Nonthaburi Sports Complex Gymnasium, Nonthaburi
Referee: Yahya Alathwani (Saudi Arabia)

19 December 2025
16:00

Myanmar	2–4	Vietnam
Min Khant Thu 31'; Naing Linn Tun Kyaw 40'	Report	Nguyễn Đa Hải 25', 33'; Trịnh Công Đại 36'; Vũ Ngọc Ánh 38'

Nonthaburi Sports Complex Gymnasium, Nonthaburi
Referee: Moon Dae-sung (South Korea)

=== Women's tournament ===
Team roster

Vietnam announced their final squad on 9 December 2025.

Head coach: Nguyễn Đình Hoàng

No.	Pos.	Player	Date of birth (age)	Club
	GK	Trần Thị Hải Yến	1998 (aged 26–27)	(Vietnam Football Federation) Phong Phú Hà Nam
	GK	Ngô Nguyễn Thùy Linh	21 September 1991 (aged 34)	(Vietnam Football Federation) Thái Sơn Nam HCMC
	DF	Nguyễn Thị Vân Anh	13 August 1996 (aged 29)	(Vietnam Football Federation) Thái Sơn Nam HCMC
	DF	Trần Thị Thùy Trang	8 August 1988 (aged 37)	(Vietnam Football Federation) Hồ Chí Minh City
	DF	A Dắt Rin Tô		(Vietnam Football Federation) Thái Sơn Nam HCMC
	DF	Nguyễn Phương Anh	1999 (aged 25–26)	(Vietnam Football Federation) Thái Sơn Nam HCMC
	MF	Trần Nguyệt Vi	22 September 1999 (aged 26)	(Vietnam Football Federation) Thái Sơn Nam HCMC
	MF	Lê Thị Thanh Ngân	8 April 2001 (aged 24)	(Vietnam Football Federation) Thái Sơn Nam HCMC
	MF	Biện Thị Hằng	9 August 1996 (aged 29)	(Vietnam Football Federation) Hà Nội
	FW	Trần Thị Thu Xuân	21 December 2002 (aged 22)	(Vietnam Football Federation) Than KSVN
	FW	K'Thủa	13 August 2003 (aged 22)	(Vietnam Football Federation) Hồ Chí Minh City
	FW	Bùi Thị Trang	10 November 1997 (aged 28)	(Vietnam Football Federation) Thái Sơn Nam HCMC
		Đinh Thị Ngọc Hân	2000 (aged 24–25)	(Vietnam Football Federation) Thái Sơn Nam HCMC
		Lâm Thị Xuân		(Vietnam Football Federation) Thái Sơn Nam HCMC

Group play

Pos	Team	Pld	W	D	L	GF	GA	GD	Pts	Qualification
1	Vietnam	2	2	0	0	7	3	+4	6	Advance to knockout stage
2	Indonesia	2	1	0	1	5	3	+2	3	Advance to knockout stage
3	Myanmar	2	0	0	2	2	8	−6	0	

Source: VFF
12 December 2025
13:30

Vietnam	3–1	Indonesia
Trần Thị Thùy Trang 24'; Lê Thị Thanh Ngân 28' (pen.); Nguyễn Phương Anh 38'	Report	Olin Quisepina 39'

Bangkokthonburi University Gymnasium, Bangkok
Referee: Nurul Atikah Janah (Malaysia)

14 December 2025
13:30

Myanmar	2–4	Vietnam
Ei El Kyaw 11'; Khin Moe Wai 27'	Report	Nguyễn Phương Anh 17'; Lê Thị Thanh Ngân 18'; A Dắt Rin Tô 34'; Bùi Thị Trang 35'

Bangkokthonburi University Gymnasium, Bangkok
Referee: Zhu Xin (China)

Semi-finals

16 December 2025
13:30

Vietnam	1–0	Philippines
Trần Nguyệt Vi 25'	Report

Bangkokthonburi University Gymnasium, Bangkok
Referee: Gelareh Nazemi (Iran)

Gold medal match

18 December 2025
16:30

Vietnam	5–0	Indonesia
Lê Thị Thanh Ngân 5', 7'; Trần Thị Thùy Trang 8'; K'Thủa 11'; Trần Nguyệt Vi 40'	Report

Bangkokthonburi University Gymnasium, Bangkok
Referee: Panadda Khotsenaphattra (Thailand)

== Golf ==
Vietnam will send seven golfers (four men and three women) into the competition.

=== Men's ===
- Nguyễn Trọng Hoàng
- Hồ Anh Huy
- Nguyễn Anh Minh
- Nguyễn Tuấn Anh

=== Women's ===
- Lê Chúc An
- Lê Nguyễn Minh Anh
- Nguyễn Viễt Gia Hân

== Karate ==
Kata
Kumite

Athlete	Event	Round 1		Semifinals		Final	
Athlete	Event	Opposition Score	Rank	Opposition Score	Rank	Opposition Score	Rank
Hoàng Thị Mỹ Tâm	Women's 55kg						

== Table tennis ==
Men's

- Đinh Anh Hoàng
- Nguyễn Anh Tú
- Nguyễn Đức Tuấn
- Đoàn Bá Tuấn Anh
- Lê Đình Đức

Women's

- Nguyễn Thị Nga
- Bùi Ngọc Lan
- Nguyễn Khoa Diệu Khánh
- Trần Mai Ngọc
- Mai Hoàng Mỹ Trang

== Tennis ==
Men's

- Vũ Hà Minh Đức
- Nguyễn Minh Phát
- Nguyễn Văn Phương
- Từ Lê Khánh Duy
- Đinh Viết Tuấn Minh

Women's

- Thụy Thanh Trúc
- Nguyễn Thị Mai Linh
- Ngô Hồng Hạnh
- Chanelle Vân Nguyễn
- Savana Lý Nguyễn

== Volleyball ==
=== Indoor ===
Summary

Team	Event	Group stage				Semifinal	Final / BM	
Team	Event	Opposition Score	Opposition Score	Opposition Score	Rank	Opposition Score	Opposition Score	Rank
Vietnam	Men's tournament	Laos; W 3–0	Singapore; W 3–0	Thailand; L 0–3	2 Q	Indonesia; L 2–3	Philippines	
Vietnam	Women's tournament	Myanmar; W 3–0	Malaysia; W 3–0	Indonesia; W 3–0	1 Q	Philippines; W 3–0	Thailand; L 2–3	2nd place, silver medalist(s)

== Weightlifting ==
Men's

Athlete	Event	Snatch					Clean & Jerk					Total	Rank
Athlete	Event	1	2	3	Result	Rank	1	2	3	Result	Rank	Total	Rank
K' Dương	60 kg												
Trần Minh Trí	65 kg												
Nguyễn Đức Toàn	71 kg												
Nguyễn Quang Trường	79 kg												
Nguyễn Quốc Toàn	88 kg												
Trần Xuân Dũng	94 kg												
Trần Đình Thắng	+ 94 kg												

Women's

Athlete	Event	Snatch					Clean & Jerk					Total	Rank
Athlete	Event	1	2	3	Result	Rank	1	2	3	Result	Rank	Total	Rank
Nguyễn Thị Thu Trang	48 kg												
Nguyễn Hoài Hương	53 kg												
Quàng Thị Tâm	58 kg												
Nguyễn Thị Thuỷ Tiên	63 kg												
Hoàng Kim Lụa	69 kg												
Nguyễn Thị Phương	77 kg												
Phasiro	+77 kg												
