= Swimming at the 2025 SEA Games – Men's 400 metre freestyle =

Men's 400 metre freestyle at the 2025 SEA Games
- Venue: SAT Swimming Pool
- Date: 15 December
- Competitors: 12 from 8 nations
- Winning time: 3:50.63

Medalists
gold medal	Khiew Hoe Yean	Malaysia
silver medal	Trần Văn Nguyễn Quốc	Vietnam
bronze medal	Nguyễn Huy Hoàng	Vietnam

The men's 400 metre freestyle event at the 2025 SEA Games will take place on 15 December 2025 at the SAT Swimming Pool in Bangkok, Thailand.

== Schedule ==
All times are Indochina Standard Time (UTC+07:00)

Date	Time	Event
Monday, 15 December 2025	9:41	Heats
Monday, 15 December 2025	19:11	Final

== Records ==
Prior to this competition, the existing world, Asian, and Southeast Asian Games records were as follows.

World Record	Lukas Märtens (GER)	3:39.96	Stockholm, Sweden	12 April 2025
Asian Record	Sun Yang (CHN)	3:40.14	London, United Kingdom	28 July 2012
Games Record	Nguyễn Huy Hoàng (VIE)	3:48.06	Hanoi, Vietnam	16 May 2022

== Results ==
=== Heats ===
Rank	Heat	Lane	Swimmer	Nationality	Time	Notes
1	2	4	Nguyễn Huy Hoàng	Vietnam	3:58.27	Q
2	1	6	Russel Pang	Singapore	3:59.65	Q
3	2	5	Glen Lim	Singapore	4:00.58	Q
4	1	5	Trần Văn Nguyễn Quốc	Vietnam	4:01.43	Q
5	1	4	Khiew Hoe Yean	Malaysia	4:01.83	Q
6	1	3	Nicholas Karel Subagyo	Indonesia	4:01.85	Q
7	2	3	Muhammad Dhuha Zulfikry	Malaysia	4:02.89	Q
8	2	6	Made Aubrey Jaya	Indonesia	4:03.43	Q
9	2	2	Khomchan Wichachai	Thailand	4:05.49	R
10	1	2	Peerapat Settheechaichana	Thailand	4:09.87	R

=== Final ===
Rank	Lane	Swimmer	Nationality	Time	Notes
1st place, gold medalist(s)	2	Khiew Hoe Yean	Malaysia	3:50.63	
2nd place, silver medalist(s)	6	Trần Văn Nguyễn Quốc	Vietnam	3:53.18	
3rd place, bronze medalist(s)	4	Nguyễn Huy Hoàng	Vietnam	3:53.50	
4	3	Glen Lim	Singapore	3:56.94	
5	7	Nicholas Karel Subagyo	Indonesia	3:57.29	
6	8	Made Aubrey Jaya	Indonesia	3:57.33	
7	5	Russel Pang	Singapore	3:57.35	
8	1	Muhammad Dhuha Zulfikry	Malaysia	4:04.29	
