= Judo at the 2025 SEA Games =

- Venue: Rajamangala Auditorium, Rajamangala University of Technology Thanyaburi
- Location: Khlong Luang, Pathum Thani, Thailand
- Dates: 11–14 December 2025

Judo competitions at the 2025 SEA Games took place at Rajamangala Auditorium, Rajamangala University of Technology Thanyaburi in Khlong Luang, Pathum Thani, from 11 to 14 December 2025.

== Medal table ==
* Host nation (Thailand)

Rank	Nation	Gold	Silver	Bronze	Total
1	Thailand*	4	3	3	10
2	Indonesia	4	2	1	7
3	Philippines	2	3	2	7
4	Vietnam	1	3	8	12
5	Malaysia	1	0	1	2
6	Myanmar	0	1	3	4
7	Singapore	0	0	3	3
8	Laos	0	0	2	2
Totals (8 entries)		12	12	23	47

== Medalists ==
=== Kata ===
Event	Gold	Silver	Bronze
Men's Nage-no-kata	Vietnam; Phan Minh Hạnh; Trần Quốc Cường	Thailand; Pongthep Tumrongluk; Sangob Sasipongpan	Myanmar; Hlaing Min Khant; La Yaung Shan
Men's Nage-no-kata	Vietnam; Phan Minh Hạnh; Trần Quốc Cường	Thailand; Pongthep Tumrongluk; Sangob Sasipongpan	Laos; Khamsy Khounnivath; Dethsouvan Vongsavanhkham
Women's Ju-no-kata	Thailand; Suphattra Jaikhumkao; Pitima Thaweerattanasinp	Vietnam; Vũ Hoàng Khánh Ngọc; Mai Thị Bích Trâm	Philippines; Ma. Jeanalane Lopez; Leah Jhane Lopez
Women's Ju-no-kata	Thailand; Suphattra Jaikhumkao; Pitima Thaweerattanasinp	Vietnam; Vũ Hoàng Khánh Ngọc; Mai Thị Bích Trâm	Laos; Phonevan Sy Amphone; Mayouly Phanouvong

=== Combat ===
Event	Gold	Silver	Bronze
Men's 55 kg	Muhammad Rizqi Maulana; Indonesia	Nguyễn Hoàng Thành; Vietnam	Daryl John Mercado; Philippines
Men's 55 kg	Muhammad Rizqi Maulana; Indonesia	Nguyễn Hoàng Thành; Vietnam	Htike Htike Kyaw; Myanmar
Men's 66–73 kg	Masayuki Terada; Thailand	Gabriel Benedict Quitain; Philippines	Dewa Kadek Rama Warma Putra; Indonesia
Men's 66–73 kg	Masayuki Terada; Thailand	Gabriel Benedict Quitain; Philippines	Nguyễn Hải Bá; Vietnam
Men's 73–81 kg	Amir Daniel Abdul Majeed; Malaysia	John Viron Ferrer; Philippines	Teo Chee Hern; Singapore
Men's 73–81 kg	Amir Daniel Abdul Majeed; Malaysia	John Viron Ferrer; Philippines	Lê Đức Đông; Vietnam
Men's 81–90 kg	I Made Sastra Dharma; Indonesia	Wei Puyang; Thailand	Ryan Goh Yik Seng; Singapore
Men's 81–90 kg	I Made Sastra Dharma; Indonesia	Wei Puyang; Thailand	Lê Anh Tài; Vietnam
Men's 90–100 kg	Chino Sy Tancontian; Philippines	Gede Ganding Kalbu Soethama; Indonesia	Kittipong Hantratin; Thailand
Men's 90–100 kg	Chino Sy Tancontian; Philippines	Gede Ganding Kalbu Soethama; Indonesia	Phạm Thế Minh Hiếu; Vietnam
Women's 52–57 kg	Dinny Febriany; Indonesia	Joemari-Heart Rafael; Philippines	Kamolwan Akkajan; Thailand
Women's 52–57 kg	Dinny Febriany; Indonesia	Joemari-Heart Rafael; Philippines	Nguyễn Thị Thanh Thủy; Vietnam
Women's 63–70 kg	Syerina; Indonesia	Lê Huỳnh Tường Vi; Vietnam	Supattra Nanong; Thailand
Women's 63–70 kg	Syerina; Indonesia	Lê Huỳnh Tường Vi; Vietnam	Zhen Yuxuan; Singapore
Women's 70–78 kg	Ikumi Oeda; Thailand	Aye Aye Aung; Myanmar	Lương Như Quỳnh; Vietnam
Women's over 78 kg	Thonthan Satjadet; Thailand	Indah Permatasari; Indonesia	Dương Thanh Thanh; Vietnam
Women's over 78 kg	Thonthan Satjadet; Thailand	Indah Permatasari; Indonesia	Nor Izzatul Fazlia Tahir; Malaysia
Mixed team	Philippines; Joemari-Heart Rafael; Leah Jhane Lopez; Khrizzie Pabulayan; John Viron Ferrer; Randy Jr Ferrera; Rhyan Zarchie Garay; Esleken Kedo; Gabriel Benedict Quitain; Chino Sy Tancontian	Thailand; Wei Puyang; Kamolwan Akkajan; Ikumi Oeda; Natthakun Wichan; Kittipong Hantratin; Chatthayaporn Prawiset; Surasak Puntanam; Rattanan Kaunsatan; Supattra Nanong; Thonthan Satjadet; Masayuki Terada; Photchara Kanchu	Myanmar; Phyo Sa Htet Wai; Htet Aung; Kyaw Khant Soe; Nan Thae Nu Nu San; Zaw Lin Phyo; Pyae Sone Aung; Phyo Swe Zin Kyaw; La Yaung San; Aung Thant Zin Win; Aye Aye Aung
Mixed team	Philippines; Joemari-Heart Rafael; Leah Jhane Lopez; Khrizzie Pabulayan; John Viron Ferrer; Randy Jr Ferrera; Rhyan Zarchie Garay; Esleken Kedo; Gabriel Benedict Quitain; Chino Sy Tancontian	Thailand; Wei Puyang; Kamolwan Akkajan; Ikumi Oeda; Natthakun Wichan; Kittipong Hantratin; Chatthayaporn Prawiset; Surasak Puntanam; Rattanan Kaunsatan; Supattra Nanong; Thonthan Satjadet; Masayuki Terada; Photchara Kanchu	Vietnam; Dương Thanh Thanh; Nguyễn Thị Ngọc Nhung; Lâm Trường Vũ; Nguyễn Ngọc Diễm Phương; Trần Thị Thanh Thuỷ; Nguyễn Thị Thanh Thủy; Nguyễn Châu Hoàng Lan; Lê Huỳnh Tường Vi; Nguyễn Hải Bá; Lê Đức Đồng; Lê Anh Tài; Phạm Thế Minh Hiếu
