= Pencak silat at the 2025 SEA Games =

- Venue: Impact Arena
- Location: Pak Kret, Nonthaburi, Thailand
- Dates: 13–17 December 2025

Pencak silat competitions at the 2025 SEA Games took place at Impact Arena, Muang Thong Thani in Pak Kret, Nonthaburi, Thailand, from 13 to 17 December 2025.

== Medal table ==
* Host nation (Thailand)

Rank	Nation	Gold	Silver	Bronze	Total
1	Indonesia	4	1	7	12
2	Thailand*	3	4	3	10
3	Malaysia	3	2	1	6
4	Vietnam	2	2	6	10
5	Singapore	1	2	2	5
6	Brunei	0	1	0	1
6	Laos	0	1	0	1
8	Philippines	0	0	7	7
Totals (8 entries)		13	13	26	52

== Medalists ==
=== Seni ===
Event	Gold	Silver	Bronze
Men's singles (Tunggal)	Ilyas Sadara; Thailand	Alisack Singsouvong; Laos	Syarief Hidayatullah Suhaimi; Indonesia
Men's singles (Tunggal)	Ilyas Sadara; Thailand	Alisack Singsouvong; Laos	Almohaidib Abad; Philippines
Men's team (Regu)	Indonesia; Andika Dhanireksa; Asep Yuldan Sani; Rano Slamet Nugraha	Singapore; Muhammadinil Mustafar Bin Mohd Isa; Muhammad Affiz Bin Mohamed Zakri; Muhammad Nazrul Bin Mohd Kamal	Thailand; Islamee Wani; Abdulkarim Koolee; Sobri Cheni
Men's team (Regu)	Indonesia; Andika Dhanireksa; Asep Yuldan Sani; Rano Slamet Nugraha	Singapore; Muhammadinil Mustafar Bin Mohd Isa; Muhammad Affiz Bin Mohamed Zakri; Muhammad Nazrul Bin Mohd Kamal	Philippines; Rick-Rod Ortega; Edmar Tacuel; James El Mayagma
Women's singles (Tunggal)	Nur Syafiqah Hamzah; Malaysia	Nur Wasiqah Aziemah; Brunei	Puspa Arumsari; Indonesia
Women's singles (Tunggal)	Nur Syafiqah Hamzah; Malaysia	Nur Wasiqah Aziemah; Brunei	Nurin Insyirah Binte Mohamed Aidil; Singapore

=== Tanding ===
Men

Event	Gold	Silver	Bronze
Class U45 (–45 kg)	Andika Bin Razali Dhani; Singapore	Khoirudin Mustakim; Indonesia	Harold Ralph Ungaya; Philippines
Class U45 (–45 kg)	Andika Bin Razali Dhani; Singapore	Khoirudin Mustakim; Indonesia	Nguyễn Đức Hậu; Vietnam
Class A (45–50 kg)	Areef Arli; Thailand	Muhammad Amirul Hakim Jaaffar; Malaysia	Antonius Efrem Tuke Eduk; Indonesia
Class A (45–50 kg)	Areef Arli; Thailand	Muhammad Amirul Hakim Jaaffar; Malaysia	Lê Văn Phước; Vietnam
Class C (55–60 kg)	Muhammad Zaki Zikrillah Prasong; Indonesia	Tinnapat Janjaroen; Thailand	Vũ Văn Kiên; Vietnam
Class C (55–60 kg)	Muhammad Zaki Zikrillah Prasong; Indonesia	Tinnapat Janjaroen; Thailand	Gregmart Benitez; Philippines
Class D (60–65 kg)	Muhammad Izzul Irfan Marzuki; Malaysia	Phiraphon Mitthasan; Thailand	Cyrell Covon; Philippines
Class D (60–65 kg)	Muhammad Izzul Irfan Marzuki; Malaysia	Phiraphon Mitthasan; Thailand	Nguyễn Minh Triết; Vietnam
Class E (65–70 kg)	Tito Hendra Septa Kurnia; Indonesia	Muhamad Helmi; Malaysia	Natdanai Keangkaew; Thailand
Class E (65–70 kg)	Tito Hendra Septa Kurnia; Indonesia	Muhamad Helmi; Malaysia	Bùi Đình Quyết; Vietnam
Class F (70–75 kg)	Aekarat Maehchi; Thailand	Vũ Đức Hùng; Vietnam	Allimar Campos; Philippines
Class F (70–75 kg)	Aekarat Maehchi; Thailand	Vũ Đức Hùng; Vietnam	Iqbal Candra Pratama; Indonesia
Class G (75–80 kg)	Nguyễn Tấn Sang; Vietnam	Suthat Bunchit; Thailand	Igi Rangga Barani; Indonesia
Class G (75–80 kg)	Nguyễn Tấn Sang; Vietnam	Suthat Bunchit; Thailand	Abdul Raaziq Bin Abdul Rashid; Singapore
Class I (85–90 kg)	Nguyễn Duy Tuyên; Vietnam	Sheik Ferdous Bin Sheik Alauddin; Singapore	Sadan Ahmed Sidik Lisanaka; Indonesia
Class I (85–90 kg)	Nguyễn Duy Tuyên; Vietnam	Sheik Ferdous Bin Sheik Alauddin; Singapore	Muhammad Robial Sobri; Malaysia

Women

Event	Gold	Silver	Bronze
Class B (50–55 kg)	Safira Dwi Meilani; Indonesia	Dương Thị Hải Quyền; Vietnam	Chongthima Rueanthong; Thailand
Class B (50–55 kg)	Safira Dwi Meilani; Indonesia	Dương Thị Hải Quyền; Vietnam	Hanna Mae Ibutnande; Philippines
Class C (55–60 kg)	Ummi Mashitah Hassan; Malaysia	Anuntaya Niyompan; Thailand	Lê Thị Vân Anh; Vietnam
Class C (55–60 kg)	Ummi Mashitah Hassan; Malaysia	Anuntaya Niyompan; Thailand	Dinda Nuraidha; Indonesia
