= Swimming at the 2025 SEA Games – Men's 200 metre butterfly =

Men's 200 metre butterfly at the 2025 SEA Games
- Venue: SAT Swimming Pool
- Date: 15 December
- Competitors: 9 from 6 nations
- Winning time: 1:59.64

Medalists
gold medal	Surasit Thongdeang	Thailand
silver medal	Dương Văn Hoàng Quy	Vietnam
bronze medal	Nguyễn Quang Thuấn	Vietnam

The men's 200 metre butterfly event at the 2025 SEA Games will take place on 15 December 2025 at the SAT Swimming Pool in Bangkok, Thailand.

== Schedule ==
All times are Indochina Standard Time (UTC+07:00)

Date	Time	Event
Monday, 15 December 2025	9:56	Heats
Monday, 15 December 2025	19:33	Final

== Records ==
Prior to this competition, the existing world, Asian, and Southeast Asian Games records were as follows.

World Record	Kristóf Milák (HUN)	1:50.34	Budapest, Hungary	21 June 2022
Asian Record	Daiya Seto (JPN)	1:52.53	Beijing, China	18 January 2020
Games Record	Joseph Schooling (SGP)	1:55.73	Singapore, Singapore	8 June 2015

== Results ==
=== Heats ===
Rank	Heat	Lane	Swimmer	Nationality	Time	Notes
1	2	4	Surasit Thongdeang	Thailand	2:04.47	Q
2	1	3	Ardi Zulhilmi Azman	Singapore	2:05.49	Q
3	2	3	Henry Goh Li Hen	Malaysia	2:07.19	Q
4	1	5	Dương Văn Hoàng Quy	Vietnam	2:08.72	Q
5	1	6	Mochamad Akbar Putra Taufik	Indonesia	2:08.82	Q
6	2	5	Nguyễn Quang Thuấn	Vietnam	2:09.26	Q
7	1	4	Wongsakorn Patsamarn	Thailand	2:09.32	Q
8	2	6	Jayden Goh Li Jie	Malaysia	2:10.32	Q
9	2	2	Han Paing Htoo	Myanmar	2:25.68	R

=== Final ===
Rank	Lane	Swimmer	Nationality	Time	Notes
1st place, gold medalist(s)	4	Surasit Thongdeang	Thailand	1:59.64	
2nd place, silver medalist(s)	2	Dương Văn Hoàng Quy	Vietnam	2:01.57	
3rd place, bronze medalist(s)	3	Nguyễn Quang Thuấn	Vietnam	2:02.60	
4	6	Wongsakorn Patsamarn	Thailand	2:02.87	
5	1	Henry Goh Li Hen	Malaysia	2:03.02	
6	5	Ardi Zulhilmi Azman	Singapore	2:05.04	
7	7	Mochamad Akbar Putra Taufik	Indonesia	2:06.46	
8	8	Jayden Goh Li Jie	Malaysia	2:08.48	
