= Muaythai at the 2025 SEA Games =

Muay Thai at the 2025 SEA Games
- Venue: Lumpinee Boxing Stadium, Bang Khen
- Location: Bangkok, Thailand
- Dates: 13–17 December 2025

Muaythai competitions at the 2025 SEA Games took place at Lumpinee Boxing Stadium in Bang Khen, Bangkok, from 13 to 17 December 2025.

== Medal table ==
* Host nation (Thailand)

Rank	Nation	Gold	Silver	Bronze	Total
1	Thailand*	11	6	1	18
2	Malaysia	3	3	4	10
3	Vietnam	2	4	5	11
4	Philippines	2	1	8	11
5	Laos	0	2	3	5
6	Indonesia	0	1	4	5
7	Singapore	0	1	2	3
8	Myanmar	0	0	9	9
Totals (8 entries)		18	18	36	72

== Medalists ==
=== Men's ===
Event	Gold	Silver	Bronze
45 kg (Pin weight)	Saladkaew Krittanu; Thailand	Tyron Jamborillo; Philippines	Saw Myat Moe; Myanmar
45 kg (Pin weight)	Saladkaew Krittanu; Thailand	Tyron Jamborillo; Philippines	Nguyễn Hoàng Sơn; Vietnam
48 kg (Light flyweight)	Phetrak Supphanat; Thailand	Dương Đức Bảo; Vietnam	Ramiscal Jan Brix; Philippines
48 kg (Light flyweight)	Phetrak Supphanat; Thailand	Dương Đức Bảo; Vietnam	Banxadeth Sibou; Laos
51 kg (Flyweight)	LJ Rafael Yasay; Philippines	Insyad Rumijam; Malaysia	Htang Khui Shing; Myanmar
51 kg (Flyweight)	LJ Rafael Yasay; Philippines	Insyad Rumijam; Malaysia	Minindi Chalongchai; Thailand
54 kg (Bantamweight)	Wassof Rumijam; Malaysia	Hijanak Thongchai; Thailand	Saw Khaing Ye Linn; Myanmar
54 kg (Bantamweight)	Wassof Rumijam; Malaysia	Hijanak Thongchai; Thailand	Mark Jeremy Balmoris; Philippines
57 kg (Featherweight)	Mikail Ghazali Zulfikar; Malaysia	Sirilun Suphakon; Thailand	Seuaphom Thongbang; Laos
57 kg (Featherweight)	Mikail Ghazali Zulfikar; Malaysia	Sirilun Suphakon; Thailand	Saw Ah Tit; Myanmar
60 kg (Lightweight)	Atidsam Saksit; Thailand	Taipanyavong Soukan; Laos	Đào Đại Hải; Vietnam
60 kg (Lightweight)	Atidsam Saksit; Thailand	Taipanyavong Soukan; Laos	Ejay Galendez; Philippines
63.5 kg (Light welterweight)	Sapmanee Ruthaiphan; Thailand	Phạm Ngọc Mẫn; Vietnam	Yay Chan; Myanmar
63.5 kg (Light welterweight)	Sapmanee Ruthaiphan; Thailand	Phạm Ngọc Mẫn; Vietnam	Indra Surya Hutagalung; Indonesia
67 kg (Welterweight)	Thingnamrob AbdolMalek; Thailand	Souliyavong Latxasak; Laos	Nguyễn Doãn Long; Vietnam
67 kg (Welterweight)	Thingnamrob AbdolMalek; Thailand	Souliyavong Latxasak; Laos	Mathew Blane Comicho; Philippines
71 kg (Light middleweight)	Chaithong Narongchai; Thailand	Bàng Quang Thắng; Vietnam	Tun Min Aung; Myanmar
71 kg (Light middleweight)	Chaithong Narongchai; Thailand	Bàng Quang Thắng; Vietnam	Khoo Jeryl Chung Yang; Singapore
75 kg (Middleweight)	Saophanao Thotsaphon; Thailand	Nguyễn Thanh Tùng; Vietnam	Ammarul Shafiq Ubaidillah; Malaysia
75 kg (Middleweight)	Saophanao Thotsaphon; Thailand	Nguyễn Thanh Tùng; Vietnam	Teo Terrence Jia Jin; Singapore
Waikru individual	Thippranee Pithaya; Thailand	Aldento Bara Pratama; Indonesia	Phillip Delarmino; Philippines
Waikru individual	Thippranee Pithaya; Thailand	Aldento Bara Pratama; Indonesia	Asyraf Danial Abdul Latif; Malaysia

=== Women's ===
Event	Gold	Silver	Bronze
45 kg (Pin weight)	Erika Bomogao Islay; Philippines	Arissara Noon-eiad; Thailand	Damia Husna Azian; Malaysia
45 kg (Pin weight)	Erika Bomogao Islay; Philippines	Arissara Noon-eiad; Thailand	Hoàng Khánh Mai; Vietnam
48 kg (Light flyweight)	Tangchio Niracha; Thailand	Eva Anatasia Warren; Malaysia	Rudzma Abubakar; Philippines
48 kg (Light flyweight)	Tangchio Niracha; Thailand	Eva Anatasia Warren; Malaysia	Sithong Loukket; Laos
51 kg (Flyweight)	Aonok Kullanat; Thailand	Nur Amisha Azrilrizal; Malaysia	Floryvic Montero; Philippines
51 kg (Flyweight)	Aonok Kullanat; Thailand	Nur Amisha Azrilrizal; Malaysia	Christia Stevannie Rejune; Indonesia
54 kg (Bantamweight)	Tangchio Nirawan; Thailand	Ginny Teo An Ling; Singapore	Mar Lar Win; Myanmar
54 kg (Bantamweight)	Tangchio Nirawan; Thailand	Ginny Teo An Ling; Singapore	Đinh Thị Hoa; Vietnam
57 kg (Featherweight)	Nguyễn Thị Chiều; Vietnam	Kamtakrapoom Kaewrudee; Thailand	Ohmar Soe; Myanmar
57 kg (Featherweight)	Nguyễn Thị Chiều; Vietnam	Kamtakrapoom Kaewrudee; Thailand	Adisty Gracelia Lolaroh; Indonesia
60 kg (Lightweight)	Nguyễn Thị Phương Hậu; Vietnam	Sahot Areeya; Thailand	Elizabeth Cing Za Huai; Myanmar
60 kg (Lightweight)	Nguyễn Thị Phương Hậu; Vietnam	Sahot Areeya; Thailand	Nurul Rasyidah Suratman; Malaysia
Waikru individual	Yan Jia Chi; Malaysia	Thongduang Thanawan; Thailand	Christia Junetha Melva; Indonesia
Waikru individual	Yan Jia Chi; Malaysia	Thongduang Thanawan; Thailand	Erika Bomogao Islay; Philippines
