= Chongthima Rueanthong =

Thai pencak silat practitioner (born 2000)

- Born: 23 January 2000 (age 26); Thailand
- Nationality: Thai
- Style: Pencak silat

Chongthima Rueanthong (born 23 January 2000) is a Thai pencak silat practitioner who competes in Class B.

== Career ==
In July 2025, at the 9th Asian Pencak Silat Championships, Chongthima reached the semifinals in her category where she lost to Safira Dwi Meilani, the latter in whom went on to win the gold medal.

In December 2025, at the 2025 SEA Games, Chongthima competed in pencak silat. She defeated Nor Farah binti Mazlan in the quarterfinals of the women's Class B tanding event due to a tiebreaker rule, as both competitors ended with a 60–60 tie. However, the winner was decided due to Nor Farah committing more number of fouls, prompting a Malaysian coach to assault a judge. According to the Philippine Olympic Committee, the Filipino judge was safe after the assault and have filed a formal protest to the organizing committee. Chongthima then faced Dương Thị Hải Quyền in the semifinals and lost in a score of 67 to 37, resulting in a bronze medal.
