= Dragon boat at the 2025 SEA Games =

- Venue: Royal Thai Navy Rowing and Canoeing Training Center
- Location: Ban Chang, Rayong, Thailand
- Dates: 18-19 December 2025

Dragon boat competitions at the 2025 SEA Games took place at Royal Thai Navy Rowing and Canoeing Training Center in Ban Chang, Rayong, from 18 to 19 December 2025.

== Medal table ==
* Host nation (Thailand)

Rank	Nation	Gold	Silver	Bronze	Total
1	Indonesia	4	2	0	6
2	Vietnam	2	0	0	2
3	Thailand*	0	4	1	5
4	Myanmar	0	0	5	5
Totals (4 entries)		6	6	6	18

== Medalists ==
Event	Gold	Silver	Bronze
Men's small boat 200 m	Indonesia; Angga Suwandi Putra; Dapit; Dedi Kusmayadi; Ikballana Ikhsan; Indra Tri Setiawan; Irwan; Masrino; Mugi Harjito; Nana Maulana Saepudin; Riyan Prasetio; Sahrul Gunawan; Sutrisno; Yadi; Yuda Firmansyah	Thailand; Sukon Boon-em; Kasemsit Borriboonwasin; Chaiyakarn Choochuen; Teerasak Chuden; Suradet Faengnoi; Nattapon Kaewsri; Natthapon Kreepkamrai; Suwan Kwanthong; Chitsanupong Sangpan; Nopphadol Sangthuang; Pornchai Tesdee; Phuwadon Thongkhao; Phakdee Wannamanee; Theerapong Wonginta	Myanmar; Aung Pyae Sone; Cin Thang Lan; Htee Gaw Saw Al; Kaung San Saw Kaung; Ko Ko Tin; Lin Kyaw Saw Naing; Lin Tun Tun; Maung Yu Ya; Maw Sai Min; Oo Wai Yan; Phyo Htet Wai; Tun Zaw Zaw; Win Kyaw Swar; Zaw Tun Thet
Men's small boat 500 m	Indonesia; Angga Suwandi Putra; Dapit; Dedi Kusmayadi; Ikballana Ikhsan; Indra Tri Setiawan; Irwan; Masrino; Mugi Harjito; Nana Maulana Saepudin; Riyan Prasetio; Sahrul Gunawan; Sutrisno; Yadi; Yuda Firmansyah	Thailand; Sukon Boon-em; Kasemsit Borriboonwasin; Chaiyakarn Choochuen; Teerasak Chuden; Suradet Faengnoi; Nattapon Kaewsri; Natthapon Kreepkamrai; Suwan Kwanthong; Chitsanupong Sangpan; Nopphadol Sangthuang; Pornchai Tesdee; Phuwadon Thongkhao; Phakdee Wannamanee; Theerapong Wonginta	Myanmar; Aung Pyae Sone; Cin Thang Lan; Htee Gaw Saw Al; Kaung San Saw Kaung; Ko Ko Tin; Lin Kyaw Saw Naing; Lin Tun Tun; Maung Yu Ya; Maw Sai Min; Oo Wai Yan; Phyo Htet Wai; Tun Zaw Zaw; Win Kyaw Swar; Zaw Tun Thet
Women's small boat 200 m	Vietnam; Bùi Thị Yến; Diệp Thị Hương; Lê Thị Lan Anh; Lý Thị Nam; Lý Thị Thủy; Ma Thị Hương; Ma Thị Thủy; Nguyễn Hồng Thái; Nguyễn Thị Hải Anh; Nguyễn Thị Hương; Nguyễn Thị Lợi; Nguyễn Thị Ngân; Nguyễn Thị Tâm; Phùng Thị Ngọc Diễm	Indonesia; Adila Desvi Rahayu; Dayumin; Devita Safitri; Handayani; Maryati; Nadia Hafiza; Nur Meni; Nurevani Feraliana; Ramla Baharuddin; Ratih; Reski Wahyuni; Ririn Puji Astuti; Riska Andriyani; Sri Kandi	Thailand; Peerada Armart; Jaruwan Chaikan; Karnpitcha Kanachart; Praewpan Kawsri; Thatsanee Khomkham; Pranchalee Moonkasem; Sayawadee Ngaosri; Nipaporn Nopsri; Sukanya Poradok; Khwanchanok Saeheng; Vipavas Sangthong; Onuma Teeranaew; Karaked Thaenkaew; Orasa Thiangkathok
Women's small boat 500 m	Vietnam; Bùi Thị Yến; Diệp Thị Hương; Lê Thị Lan Anh; Lý Thị Nam; Lý Thị Thủy; Ma Thị Hương; Ma Thị Thủy; Nguyễn Hồng Thái; Nguyễn Thị Hải Anh; Nguyễn Thị Hương; Nguyễn Thị Lợi; Nguyễn Thị Ngân; Nguyễn Thị Tâm; Phùng Thị Ngọc Diễm	Indonesia; Adila Desvi Rahayu; Dayumin; Devita Safitri; Handayani; Maryati; Nadia Hafiza; Nur Meni; Nurevani Feraliana; Ramla Baharuddin; Ratih; Reski Wahyuni; Ririn Puji Astuti; Riska Andriyani; Sri Kandi	Myanmar; Aung Phyu Phyu; Chaw Ei Ei; Htwe Hla Hla; Htwe Win Win; Kyaw Lin Lin; Kyaw Soe Soe; Lwin Cho Cho; Moe San San; Myint Zun Thin Zar; Oo Thidar; Phawng Man Huai; Phyu Nway Ei; Soe Phaw Naw Htae; Win Nwe Ni
Mixed standard boat 200 m	Indonesia; Adila Desvi Rahayu; Angga Suwandi Putra; Dapit; Dayumin; Dedi Kusmayadi; Devita Safitri; Handayani; Indra Tri Setiawan; Irwan; Maryati; Masrino; Mugi Harjito; Nadia Hafiza; Nana Maulana Saepudin; Nur Meni; Ramla Baharuddin; Ratih; Reski Wahyuni; Ririn Puji Astuti; Riska Andriyani; Riyan Prasetio; Sahrul Gunawan; Sri Kandi; Sutrisno; Yadi; Yuda Firmansyah	Thailand; Peerada Armart; Sukon Boon-em; Kasemsit Borriboonwasin; Jaruwan Chaikan; Teerasak Chuden; Suradet Faengnoi; Nattapon Kaewsri; Karnpitcha Kanachart; Praewpan Kawsri; Thatsanee Khomkham; Natthapon Kreepkamrai; Suwan Kwanthong; Pranchalee Moonkasem; Nipaporn Nopsri; Sukanya Poradok; Khwanchanok Saeheng; Chitsanupong Sangpan; Nopphadol Sangthuang; Vipavas Sangthong; Onuma Teeranaew; Pornchai Tesdee; Karaked Thaenkaew; Orasa Thiangkathok; Phuwadon Thongkhao; Phakdee Wannamanee; Theerapong Wonginta	Myanmar; Aung Phyu Phyu; Aung Pyae Sone; Chaw Ei Ei; Cin Thang Lan; Htee Gaw Saw Al; Htwe Hla Hla; Htwe Win Win; Kaung San Saw Kaung; Ko Ko Tin; Kyaw Lin Lin; Kyaw Soe Soe; Lin Kyaw Saw Naing; Lin Tun Tun; Lwin Cho Cho; Maung Yu Ya; Maw Sai Min; Moe San San; Myint Zun Thin Zar; Oo Thidar; Oo Wai Yan; Phawng Man Huai; Phyo Htet Wai; Phyu Nway Ei; Soe Phaw Naw Htae; Tun Zaw Zaw; Win Kyaw Swar
Mixed standard boat 500 m	Indonesia; Angga Suwandi Putra; Dapit; Dayumin; Dedi Kusmayadi; Devita Safitri; Handayani; Ikballana Ikhsan; Indra Tri Setiawan; Irwan; Maryati; Masrino; Nadia Hafiza; Nana Maulana Saepudin; Nur Meni; Nurevani Feraliana; Ramla Baharuddin; Ratih; Reski Wahyuni; Ririn Puji Astuti; Riska Andriyani; Riyan Prasetio; Sahrul Gunawan; Sri Kandi; Sutrisno; Yadi; Yuda Firmansyah	Thailand; Peerada Armart; Sukon Boon-em; Kasemsit Borriboonwasin; Jaruwan Chaikan; Teerasak Chuden; Suradet Faengnoi; Nattapon Kaewsri; Karnpitcha Kanachart; Praewpan Kawsri; Thatsanee Khomkham; Natthapon Kreepkamrai; Suwan Kwanthong; Pranchalee Moonkasem; Nipaporn Nopsri; Sukanya Poradok; Khwanchanok Saeheng; Chitsanupong Sangpan; Nopphadol Sangthuang; Vipavas Sangthong; Onuma Teeranaew; Pornchai Tesdee; Karaked Thaenkaew; Orasa Thiangkathok; Phuwadon Thongkhao; Phakdee Wannamanee; Theerapong Wonginta	Myanmar; Aung Phyu Phyu; Aung Pyae Sone; Chaw Ei Ei; Cin Thang Lan; Htee Gaw Saw Al; Htwe Hla Hla; Htwe Win Win; Kaung San Saw Kaung; Ko Ko Tin; Kyaw Lin Lin; Kyaw Soe Soe; Lin Kyaw Saw Naing; Lin Tun Tun; Lwin Cho Cho; Maung Yu Ya; Maw Sai Min; Moe San San; Myint Zun Thin Zar; Oo Thidar; Oo Wai Yan; Phawng Man Huai; Phyo Htet Wai; Phyu Nway Ei; Soe Phaw Naw Htae; Tun Zaw Zaw; Win Kyaw Swar
