= Swimming at the 2025 SEA Games – Men's 200 metre individual medley =

Men's 200 metre individual medley at the 2025 SEA Games
- Venue: SAT Swimming Pool
- Date: 10 December
- Competitors: 10 from 7 nations
- Winning time: 2:02.11

Medalists
gold medal	Trần Hưng Nguyên	Vietnam
silver medal	Gian Christopher Santos	Philippines
bronze medal	Nguyễn Quang Thuấn	Vietnam

The men's 200 metre individual medley event at the 2025 SEA Games took place on 10 December 2025 at the SAT Swimming Pool in Bangkok, Thailand.

== Schedule ==
All times are Indochina Standard Time (UTC+07:00)

Date	Time	Event
Wednesday, 10 December 2025	9:00	Heats
Wednesday, 10 December 2025	18:00	Final

== Records ==
Prior to this competition, the existing world, Asian, and Southeast Asian Games records were as follows.

World Record	Léon Marchand (FRA)	1:52.69	Singapore, Singapore	30 July 2025
Asian Record	Wang Shun (CHN)	1:54.62	Hangzhou, China	24 September 2023
Games Record	Joseph Schooling (SGP)	2:00.66	Singapore, Singapore	10 June 2015

== Results ==
=== Heats ===
Rank	Heat	Lane	Swimmer	Nationality	Time	Notes
1	2	6	Nicholas Subagyo	Indonesia	2:07.47	Q
2	2	3	Gian Santos	Philippines	2:07.56	Q
3	2	4	Trần Hưng Nguyên	Vietnam	2:07.82	Q
4	1	4	Zackery Tay	Singapore	2:08.21	Q
4	2	5	Nguyễn Quang Thuấn	Vietnam	2:08.21	Q
6	1	5	Tan Khai Xin	Malaysia	2:08.60	Q
7	1	6	Liquor Andoko	Indonesia	2:09.58	Q
8	1	3	Maximillian Ang	Singapore	2:09.85	Q
9	2	2	Peerapat Settheechaichana	Thailand	2:10.63	R
10	1	2	Han Paing Htoo	Myanmar	2:28.70	R

=== Final ===
Rank	Lane	Swimmer	Nationality	Time	Notes
1st place, gold medalist(s)	3	Trần Hưng Nguyên	Vietnam	2:02.11	
2nd place, silver medalist(s)	5	Gian Santos	Philippines	2:03.88	
3rd place, bronze medalist(s)	2	Nguyễn Quang Thuấn	Vietnam	2:04.19	
4	7	Tan Khai Xin	Malaysia	2:05.38	
5	8	Maximillian Ang	Singapore	2:05.89	
6	4	Nicholas Subagyo	Indonesia	2:06.71	
7	6	Zackery Tay	Singapore	2:06.88	
8	1	Liquor Andoko	Indonesia	2:09.88	
