= Lê Thị Tuyết Mai =

Vietnamese diplomat (born 1967)

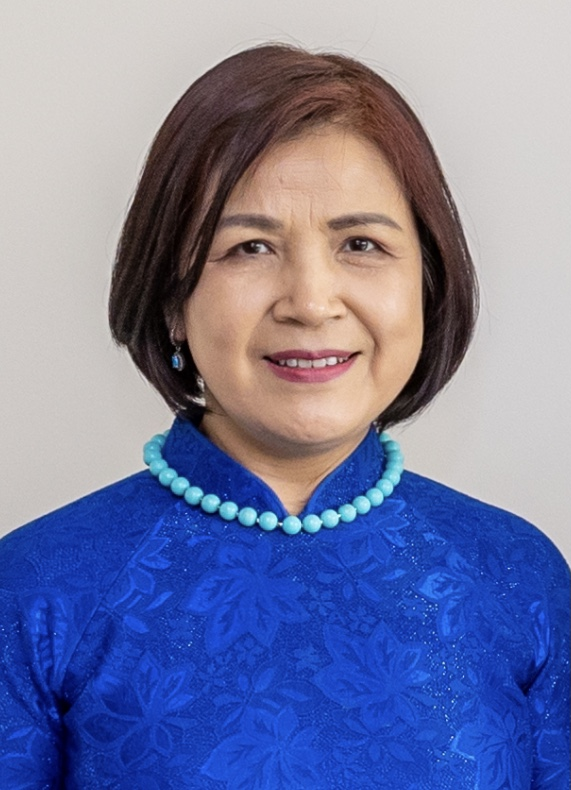
- Mai in 2023

Permanent Representative of Vietnam to the United Nations, the World Trade Organization and Other International Organizations in Geneva
- Incumbent
- Assumed office 8 February 2020

Director General of the Department of International Law and Treaties
- In office May 2017 – February 2020

Ambassador of Vietnam to Norway
- In office September 2013 – October 2016

Personal details
- Born: 1967 (age 58–59) Hanoi, Vietnam
- Spouse: Hoàng Anh Tuấn
- Children: 2
- Education: Diplomatic Academy of Vietnam; University of Kyiv; Yokohama National University

Lê Thị Tuyết Mai (born 1967) is a Vietnamese diplomat. In February 2020, she was appointed Vietnam's permanent representative to the United Nations Office, the World Trade Organization, and other international organizations based in Geneva.

== Early life and education ==
Mai was born in Hanoi, Vietnam, in 1967 and was educated at the Diplomatic Academy of Vietnam, graduating with a bachelor's degree in international relations in 1988. From 1988 to 1989, she studied Russian at the University of Kyiv. In 1997, she was awarded a master's degree in international economic law from Yokohama National University, and was awarded a PhD from the same institution in 2000.

== Career ==
In 1991 Mai joined the Vietnamese Ministry of Foreign Affairs. She has held a number of posts within the diplomatic service, including from September 2013 to October 2016 as the Vietnamese ambassador to Norway. From May 2017 to February 2020, she was Director General of the Department of International Law and Treaties. On 8 February 2020, she took up the post of Vietnam's permanent representative to the United Nations Office, the World Trade Organization, and other international organizations in Geneva, Switzerland.

Mai is a member of the leadership network International Gender Champions. She has spoken on the importance of sustainability and the preservation of coral-reef ecosystems as part of Vietnam's socio-economic policies. She has also led discussions about Vietnam's importance of and future in the e-commerce market. In 2021, she was elected the vice chair of the Intergovernmental Group of Experts of the United Nations Conference on Trade and Development.

== Personal life ==
Mai is married to Hoàng Anh Tuấn, who was appointed the Vietnamese consul general in San Francisco, United States, in 2022. They have two sons.
