= Table tennis at the 2025 SEA Games – Men's team =

Table tennis – Men's team at the 2025 SEA Games
- Venue: Westgate Hall, Central Westgate
- Dates: 13–15 December 2025
- Competitors: 35 from 7 nations

Medalists
gold medal	Singapore (SGP)
silver medal	Vietnam (VIE)
bronze medal	Malaysia (MAS)
bronze medal	Philippines (PHI)

The men's team competition of the table tennis event at the 2025 SEA Games will be held from 12th to 14th December at the Westgate Hall, Central Westgate in Nonthaburi, Thailand.

== Schedule ==
All times are Thailand Time (UTC+07:00).

Date	Time	Round
Friday, 12 December 2025	14:00	Preliminaries
Saturday, 13 December 2025	13:00	Preliminaries
Sunday, 14 December 2025	13:00	Semifinals
Sunday, 14 December 2025	16:00	Finals

== Results ==
=== Preliminary round ===
==== Group A ====
Team	Pld	W	L	MF	MA
Singapore (SGP)	3	3	0	9	2
Vietnam (VIE)	3	2	1	7	4
Indonesia (INA)	3	1	2	5	6
Myanmar (MYA)	3	0	3	0	9

==== Group B ====
Team	Pld	W	L	MF	MA
Malaysia (MAS)	3	2	1	8	3
Philippines (PHI)	3	2	1	6	4
Thailand (THA)	3	2	1	6	7
Laos (LAO)	3	0	3	3	6

=== Knockout round ===
Semifinals; 14 December 13:30
Singapore	3
Philippines	1
Vietnam	3
Malaysia	0

Gold medal match 14 December 16:00
Singapore	3
Vietnam	2
