= Table tennis at the 2025 SEA Games – Men's doubles =

Table tennis – Men's doubles at the 2025 SEA Games
- Venue: Westgate Hall, Central WestGate
- Dates: 16–17 December 2025
- Competitors: 32 from 8 nations

Medalists
| gold medal | Koen Pang Yew En; Izaac Quek Yong | Singapore |
| silver medal | Javen Choon; Wong Qi Shen | Malaysia |
| bronze medal | Thitaphat Preechayan; Phakpoom Sanguansin | Thailand |
| bronze medal | Đoàn Bá Tuấn Anh; Nguyễn Đức Tuân | Vietnam |

The men's doubles competition of the table tennis event at the 2025 SEA Games was held from 16 to 17 December 2025 at the WestGate Hall, Central WestGate in Nonthaburi, Thailand.

== Participating nations ==
A total of 32 athletes from eight nations competed in men's doubles table tennis at the 2025 Southeast Asian Games:

- Indonesia (4)
- Laos (4)
- Malaysia (4)
- Myanmar (4)
- Philippines (4)
- Singapore (4)
- Thailand (4)
- Vietnam (4)

== Schedule ==
All times are Thailand Time (UTC+07:00).

| Date | Time | Round |
|---|---|---|
| Saturday, 16 December 2025 | 14:00 | Round of 16 |
| Saturday, 16 December 2025 | 19:00 | Quarterfinals |
| Sunday, 17 December 2025 | 12:00 | Semifinals |
| Sunday, 17 December 2025 | 19:30 | Final |

== Results ==
Round of 16; 16 December
(Singapore) Pang YEK (Singapore) Quek YI
(Myanmar) AM Myat (Myanmar) TN Lin
(Indonesia) MBA Negara (Indonesia) MZ Nailufar | 11 | 11 | 11 | 3
(Laos) S Phongsavanh (Laos) A Vongsa | 6 | 1 | 3 | 0
(Malaysia) Ng DWS (Malaysia) Tey HY | 9 | 11 | 6 | 4 | 1
(Thailand) S Tancheroen (Thailand) P Saelee | 11 | 7 | 11 | 11 | 3
(Vietnam) Nguyễn ĐT (Vietnam) Đoàn BTA
(Philippines) R Gonzales (Philippines) JR Misal
(Singapore) Chua JSH (Singapore) Chew CZY | 12 | 11 | 11 | 3
(Myanmar) K Myint (Myanmar) TKK Latt | 10 | 9 | 5 | 0
(Philippines) ED Tormis (Philippines) EAR Valenet | 9 | 11 | 11 | 11 | 1
(Thailand) P Sanguansin (Thailand) T Preechayan | 11 | 13 | 6 | 13 | 3
(Vietnam) Đinh AH (Vietnam) Lê ĐĐ | 9 | 11 | 11 | 3 | 11 | 3
(Laos) J Hagberg (Laos) P Kongphet | 11 | 4 | 7 | 11 | 3 | 2
(Indonesia) RN Niman (Indonesia) AM Pratama
(Malaysia) J Chong (Malaysia) Wong QS

Quarterfinals; 16 December
(Singapore) Pang YEK (Singapore) Quek YI | 16 | 9 | 11 | 12 | 3
(Indonesia) MBA Negara (Indonesia) MZ Nailufar | 14 | 11 | 6 | 10 | 1
(Thailand) S Tancheroen (Thailand) P Saelee | 11 | 11 | 14 | 3
(Vietnam) Nguyễn ĐT (Vietnam) Đoàn BTA | 8 | 9 | 12 | 0
(Singapore) Chua JSH (Singapore) Chew CZY | 3 | 12 | 11 | 11 | 3
(Thailand) P Sanguansin (Thailand) T Preechayan | 11 | 10 | 9 | 6 | 1
(Vietnam) Đinh AH (Vietnam) Lê ĐĐ | 11 | 9 | 9 | 11 | 1
(Malaysia) J Chong (Malaysia) Wong QS | 8 | 11 | 11 | 13 | 3

Semifinals; 17 December
(Singapore) Pang YEK (Singapore) Quek YI | 11 | 11 | 11 | 3
(Thailand) P Sanguansin (Thailand) T Preechayan | 9 | 7 | 8 | 0
(Singapore) Chua JSH (Singapore) Chew CZY | 3 | 9 | 10 | 6 | 0
(Malaysia) J Chong (Malaysia) Wong QS | 11 | 11 | 12 | 3

Final; 17 December
(Singapore) Pang YEK (Singapore) Quek YI | 11 | 11 | 11 | 3
(Malaysia) J Chong (Malaysia) Wong QS | 6 | 6 | 6 | 0
