= Table tennis at the 2025 SEA Games – Women's doubles =

Table tennis – Women's doubles at the 2025 SEA Games
- Venue: Westgate Hall, Central WestGate
- Dates: 16–17 December 2025
- Competitors: 24 from 6 nations

Medalists
gold medal	Orawan Paranang; Suthasini Sawettabut	Thailand
silver medal	Tamolwan Khetkhuan; Jinnipa Sawettabut	Thailand
bronze medal	Karen Lyne Dick; Tee Ai Xin	Malaysia
bronze medal	Loy Ming Ying; Ser Lin Qian	Singapore

The women's doubles competition of the table tennis event at the 2025 SEA Games was held from 16 to 17 December at the WestGate Hall, Central WestGate in Nonthaburi, Thailand.

== Participating nations ==
A total of 24 athletes from six nations competed in women's doubles table tennis at the 2025 Southeast Asian Games:

- Indonesia (4)
- Malaysia (4)
- Philippines (4)
- Singapore (4)
- Thailand (4)
- Vietnam (4)

== Schedule ==
All times are Thailand Time (UTC+07:00).

Date	Time	Round
Saturday, 16 December 2025	15:20	Round of 16
Saturday, 16 December 2025	19:40	Quarterfinals
Sunday, 17 December 2025	11:00	Semifinals
Sunday, 17 December 2025	19:00	Final

== Results ==
Round of 16; 16 December 15:20
(Thailand) O Paranang (Thailand) S Sawettabut
Bye
(Indonesia) A Fabian (Indonesia) KA Sudarnita	11	6	11	11	3
(Singapore) Tan ZY (Singapore) Lai CNH	7	11	6	5	1
(Philippines) AJ Laude (Philippines) RJ Fadol	15	10	11	9	11	2
(Vietnam) Trần MN (Vietnam) Bùi NL	13	12	6	11	13	3
Bye
(Malaysia) KL Dick (Malaysia) Tee AX
(Singapore) Ser LQ (Singapore) Loy MY
Bye
(Philippines) SA Balatbat (Philippines) ER Dael	9	5	9	0
(Vietnam) Nguyễn TN (Vietnam) Mai HT	11	11	11	3
(Thailand) T Khetkhuan (Thailand) J Sawettabut	11	11	11	3
(Indonesia) R Sintya (Indonesia) S Aminah	6	8	4	0
Bye
(Malaysia) Chang ALS (Malaysia) Im LY

Quarterfinal; 16 December 19:40
(Thailand) O Paranang (Thailand) S Sawettabut	11	11	11	3
(Indonesia) A Fabian (Indonesia) KA Sudarnita	7	6	5	0
(Vietnam) Trần MN (Vietnam) Bùi NL	5	4	11	7	1
(Malaysia) KL Dick (Malaysia) Tee AX	11	11	9	11	3
(Singapore) Ser LQ (Singapore) Loy MY	11	12	11	3
(Vietnam) Nguyễn TN (Vietnam) Mai HT	5	10	4	0
(Thailand) T Khetkhuan (Thailand) J Sawettabut	11	11	5	9	11	3
(Malaysia) Chang ALS (Malaysia) Im LY	6	8	11	11	9	2

Semifinal; 17 December 11:00
(Thailand) O Paranang (Thailand) S Sawettabut	5	12	11	9	13	3
(Malaysia) KL Dick (Malaysia) Tee AX	11	10	7	11	11	2
(Singapore) Ser LQ (Singapore) Loy MY	11	9	9	10	1
(Thailand) T Khetkhuan (Thailand) J Sawettabut	5	11	11	12	3

Final; 17 December 19:00
(Thailand) O Paranang (Thailand) S Sawettabut	11	11	11	3
(Thailand) T Khetkhuan (Thailand) J Sawettabut	2	9	7	0
