= Water skiing and wakeboarding at the 2025 SEA Games =

- Venue: ESC Wakepark
- Location: Pathum Thani, Thailand
- Dates: 10–11 December 2025
- Nations: 5

Water skiing and wakeboarding competitions at the 2025 SEA Games took place at ESC Wake Park in Pathum Thani, Thailand from 10 to 11 December 2025. Medals were awarded in 4 events.

== Participating nations ==
- Indonesia (12)
- Malaysia (8)
- Philippines (12)
- Singapore (6)
- Thailand (16) (host)

== Medal table ==
* Host nation (Thailand)

| Rank | Nation | Gold | Silver | Bronze | Total |
|---|---|---|---|---|---|
| 1 | Thailand* | 3 | 0 | 1 | 4 |
| 2 | Indonesia | 1 | 2 | 0 | 3 |
| 3 | Malaysia | 0 | 1 | 1 | 2 |
| 4 | Singapore | 0 | 1 | 0 | 1 |
| 5 | Philippines | 0 | 0 | 2 | 2 |
| Totals (5 entries) | | 4 | 4 | 4 | 12 |

== Medalists ==
| Event | Gold | Silver | Bronze |
|---|---|---|---|
| Water ski slalom team | Indonesia; Indra Hadrinata; Guruh Dwi Samudra; Safira Ratriandari Widodo; Ummu Thoyibhatus Sholikah | Malaysia; Adam Yoong Hanifah; Aiden Yoong Hanifah; Aaliyah Yoong Hanifah; Phillipa Clare Li Foong Yoong | Thailand; Nattawut Hapholdee; Gina Buckley; Fendy Satnurak; Weeraya Rosendahl |
| Wake surf team | Thailand; Patrick Wongwut Macarthur; Kantita Chayliam; Songkrod Jomboon; Annissa Tita Flynn | Indonesia; Piki Lestari; Aldi Akmaludin; Kevin Gelbert Fotaroma Wau; Melani | Malaysia; Aiden Yoong Hanifah; Siao Wen Chew; Yi Ning Low; Yang Hou Leong |
| Wakeboard team | Thailand; Pisit Mahatthanajatuphat; Lalada Liew; Bhraebhim Pipatsawaddhi; Piti Siridhasnakul | Indonesia; Jason; Kevin Gladian; Kanaya Anindita; Rahmadani Citra Mahaueni | Philippines; Eva Dela Torre; Derek Hewitt; Mark Griffin; Frenchesca Mae Coo |
| Cable wakeboard team | Thailand; Paktanun Krisuwansarn; Lalada Liew; Bhraebhim Pipatsawaddhi; Sarawut Niamkhun; Benjamin Phechyuenyong; Peeranat Faktongyu | Singapore; Isabella Xu Ning Tan; Teck Ian Chia; Aloysious Batchelor Clarence; Nurul Farhan Misran; Tyan Po Lok Foong; Tara Ying Xuan Lim | Philippines; Derek Hewitt; Mark Louie Camomot; Frenchesca Mae Coo; Raphael Trinidad; Maritoni Gatchalian; Andrea Michelle Tanjangco |
