= Equestrian at the 2025 SEA Games =

Sports tournament in Cambodia

- Pictograms for dressage (left), eventing (center), and jumping (right)
- Venues: Thai Polo and Equestrian Club
- Location: Bang Lamung, Chonburi, Thailand
- Dates: 13–19 December
- Competitors: 17 from 5 nations

The equestrian events at the 2025 SEA Games in Bang Lamung, Chonburi were run from 13 to 19 December, featuring 17 riders across three disciplines for both individual and team competitions, namely dressage, eventing, and jumping. Men and women compete together on equal terms.

== Participating nations ==
A total of 5 NOCs participated equestrians.

- Indonesia (4)
- Malaysia (4)
- Philippines (2)
- Singapore (1)
- Thailand (6)

== Medal table ==
* Host nation (Thailand)

Rank	Nation	Gold	Silver	Bronze	Total
1	Thailand*	3	2	1	6
2	Indonesia	2	2	2	6
3	Malaysia	1	1	1	3
4	Philippines	0	1	0	1
5	Myanmar	0	0	1	1
5	Singapore	0	0	1	1
Totals (6 entries)		6	6	6	18

== Medalists ==
Event	Gold	Silver	Bronze
Individual dressage	Megan Min Ern Ding; Malaysia	Pawarisa Thongpradup; Thailand	Nynn Puttisombat; Thailand
Team dressage	Thailand; Nynn Puttisombat; Chalermcharn Yotviriyapanit; Arinadtha Chavatanont; Pawarisa Thongpradup	Indonesia; Alfaro Menayang; Dara Ninggar Prameswari; Audirania Amanda Putri; Karen Leticia Herjawan	Malaysia; Amira Syahirah Mohd Zulkefli; Diani Lee Cheng Ni; Quek Sue Yian; Megan Min Ern Ding
Individual eventing	Korntawat Samran; Thailand	Sunsinee Thaicharoen; Thailand	Steven Menayang; Indonesia
Team eventing	Thailand; Somjai Sanhom; Arinadtha Chavatanont; Sunsinee Thaicharoen; Nathasha Mekarapiruk; Korntawat Samran	Indonesia; Welda Agapindo; Jamhur Hatta; Riko Ganda Febryyanto; Steven Menayang	Myanmar; Than Naing Aung; Nan Ko Win; Saw Maung
Individual jumping	Brayen Brata-Coolen; Indonesia	Paola Lorenzo; Philippines	Arserl Rizki Brayudha; Indonesia
Team jumping	Indonesia; Brayen Brata-Coolen; Arserl Rizki Brayudha; Raymen Kaunang; Dirga Wira Ramadhan Saputra	Malaysia; Norinne Ira Dewal Md Ali; Arysha Haya Kanda; Shoorendran Nageswaran; Adam Hariz Kamaludin	Singapore; Chiara Mei Corbi; Christie Paige Nair; Gladys Yong Yu Xi; Caedan Jeyasellan Paul
