= Sport climbing at the 2025 SEA Games =

Sport Climbing at the 2025 SEA Games
- Venue: Bangkok Sport Climbing Center
- Dates: 12–14 December 2025
- Nations: 6

Competition climbing at the 2025 SEA Games took place from 12 to 14 December 2025 at the Bangkok Sport Climbing Center in Bangkok, Thailand. This marks the second time that sport climbing has featured in the SEA Games, following its inclusion in the 2011 edition in Indonesia. Men's and women's events were held in competition lead climbing, competition bouldering and competition speed climbing.

== Participating nations ==
- Indonesia
- Malaysia
- Philippines
- Singapore
- Thailand
- Vietnam

== Medal table ==
* Host nation (Thailand)

Rank	Nation	Gold	Silver	Bronze	Total
1	Indonesia (INA)	4	3	1	8
2	Thailand (THA)*	2	2	3	7
3	Singapore (SGP)	0	1	1	2
4	Philippines (PHI)	0	0	1	1
Totals (4 entries)		6	6	6	18

== Medalists ==
=== Men ===
Event	Gold	Silver	Bronze
Boulder	Auswin Aueareechit; Thailand	Ardch Intrachupongse; Thailand	Luke Goh Wen Bin; Singapore
Lead	Ardana Cikal Damarwulan; Indonesia	Auswin Aueareechit; Thailand	Mahesa Caesar; Indonesia
Speed	Antasyafi Robby Al Hilmi; Indonesia	Alfian Muhammad Fajri; Indonesia	Aphiwit Limpanichpakdee; Thailand

=== Women ===
Event	Gold	Silver	Bronze
Boulder	Natcha Supavorased; Thailand	Vanessa Si Yinn Teng; Singapore	Sofielle Prajati Dela Cruz; Philippines
Lead	Alma Ariella Tsany; Indonesia	Sukma Lintang Cahyani; Indonesia	Natcha Supavorased; Thailand
Speed	Puja Lestari; Indonesia	Susan Nurhidayah; Indonesia	Kanyanat Arsakit; Thailand
