= Table tennis at the 2025 SEA Games =

- Venue: Westgate Hall, Central WestGate
- Location: Nonthaburi, Thailand
- Dates: 12–19 Dec 2025
- Competitors: 71 from 8 nations

Table tennis at the 2025 SEA Games took place at Westgate Hall (4th floor), Central WestGate, in Nonthaburi, Thailand, from 12 to 19 December 2025.

== Participating nations ==
A total of 71 athletes from eight nations competed in table tennis at the 2025 Southeast Asian Games:

- Indonesia (10)
- Laos (5)
- Malaysia (10)
- Myanmar (6)
- Philippines (10)
- Singapore (10)
- Thailand (10)
- Vietnam (10)

== Competition schedule ==
The following is the competition schedule for the table tennis competitions:

| P | Preliminaries | R16 | Round of 16 | ¼ | Quarterfinals | ½ | Semifinals | F | Final |

| Event↓/Date → | Fri 12 | Sat 13 | Sun 14 | | Tue 16 | | Wed 17 | | Thu 18 | | Fri 19 | |
|---|---|---|---|---|---|---|---|---|---|---|---|---|
| Men's singles | | | | | | | P | | P | ¼ | ½ | F |
| Women's singles | | | | | | | P | | P | ¼ | ½ | F |
| Men's doubles | | | | | R16 | ¼ | ½ | F | | | | |
| Women's doubles | | | | | R16 | ¼ | ½ | F | | | | |
| Mixed doubles | | | | | R16 | ¼ | ½ | F | | | | |
| Men's team | P | P | ½ | F | | | | | | | | |
| Women's team | P | P | ½ | F | | | | | | | | |

== Medalists ==
| Event | Gold | Silver | Bronze |
|---|---|---|---|
| Men's singles | Izaac Quek; Singapore | Muhammad Bima Abdi Negara; Indonesia | Muhammad Naufal Junindra; Indonesia |
| Men's singles | Izaac Quek; Singapore | Muhammad Bima Abdi Negara; Indonesia | Nguyễn Anh Tú; Vietnam |
| Women's singles | Suthasini Sawettabut; Thailand | Orawan Paranang; Thailand | Alice Chang Li Sian; Malaysia |
| Women's singles | Suthasini Sawettabut; Thailand | Orawan Paranang; Thailand | Ser Lin Qian; Singapore |
| Men's doubles | Singapore; Koen Pang; Izaac Quek | Malaysia; Javen Choong; Wong Qi Shen | Thailand; Thitaphat Preechayan; Phakpoom Sanguansin |
| Men's doubles | Singapore; Koen Pang; Izaac Quek | Malaysia; Javen Choong; Wong Qi Shen | Vietnam; Đoàn Bá Tuấn Anh; Nguyễn Đức Tuân |
| Women's doubles | Thailand; Orawan Paranang; Suthasini Sawettabut | Thailand; Tamolwan Khetkhuan; Jinnipa Sawettabut | Malaysia; Karen Lyne Dick; Tee Ai Xin |
| Women's doubles | Thailand; Orawan Paranang; Suthasini Sawettabut | Thailand; Tamolwan Khetkhuan; Jinnipa Sawettabut | Singapore; Loy Ming Ying; Ser Lin Qian |
| Mixed doubles | Singapore; Koen Pang; Zeng Jian | Malaysia; Javen Choong; Karen Lyne Dick | Malaysia; Wong Qi Shen; Tee Ai Xin |
| Mixed doubles | Singapore; Koen Pang; Zeng Jian | Malaysia; Javen Choong; Karen Lyne Dick | Thailand; Nawin Nekamporn; Jinnipa Sawettabut |
| Men's team | Singapore; Clarence Chew; Josh Chua; Ellsworth Le; Koen Pang; Izaac Quek | Vietnam; Đinh Anh Hoàng; Đoàn Bá Tuấn Anh; Lê Đình Đức; Nguyễn Anh Tú; Nguyễn Đức Tuân | Malaysia; Javen Choong; Im Jin Zhen; Danny Ng Wann Sing; Tey Hong Yu; Wong Qi Shen |
| Men's team | Singapore; Clarence Chew; Josh Chua; Ellsworth Le; Koen Pang; Izaac Quek | Vietnam; Đinh Anh Hoàng; Đoàn Bá Tuấn Anh; Lê Đình Đức; Nguyễn Anh Tú; Nguyễn Đức Tuân | Philippines; Richard Gonzales; John Russel Misal; Jann Mari Nayre; Eljay Dan Tormis; Edouard Aaron Raymond Valenet |
| Women's team | Thailand; Wanwisa Aueawiriyayothin; Tamolwan Khetkhuan; Orawan Paranang; Jinnipa Sawettabut; Suthasini Sawettabut | Singapore; Chloe Lai Neng Huen; Loy Ming Ying; Ser Lin Qian; Tan Zhao Yun; Zeng Jian | Malaysia; Im Li Ying; Alice Chang Li Sian; Karen Lyne Dick; Ho Ying; Tee Ai Xin |
| Women's team | Thailand; Wanwisa Aueawiriyayothin; Tamolwan Khetkhuan; Orawan Paranang; Jinnipa Sawettabut; Suthasini Sawettabut | Singapore; Chloe Lai Neng Huen; Loy Ming Ying; Ser Lin Qian; Tan Zhao Yun; Zeng Jian | Philippines; Sendrina Andrea Balatbat; Kheith Rhynne Cruz; Emy Rose Dael; Rose Jean Fadol; Angelou Joyce Laude |

== Medal table ==
* Host nation (Thailand)

| Rank | Nation | Gold | Silver | Bronze | Total |
|---|---|---|---|---|---|
| 1 | Singapore | 4 | 1 | 2 | 7 |
| 2 | Thailand* | 3 | 2 | 2 | 7 |
| 3 | Malaysia | 0 | 2 | 5 | 7 |
| 4 | Vietnam | 0 | 1 | 2 | 3 |
| 5 | Indonesia | 0 | 1 | 1 | 2 |
| 6 | Philippines | 0 | 0 | 2 | 2 |
| Totals (6 entries) | | 7 | 7 | 14 | 28 |
