= Thailand at the 2025 SEA Games =

- IOC code: THA
- NOC: National Olympic Committee of Thailand
- Website: www.olympicthai.org (in Thai and English)

in Bangkok and Chonburi 9 – 20 December 2025
- Competitors: 1,807 in 50 sports
- Flag bearers: Janjaem Suwannapheng; Kunlavut Vitidsarn
- Medals Ranked 1st: Gold 233 Silver 154 Bronze 112 Total 499

SEA Games appearances (overview)
- 1961; 1965; 1967; 1969; 1971; 1973; 1975; 1977; 1979; 1981; 1983; 1985; 1987; 1989; 1991; 1993; 1995; 1997; 1999; 2001; 2003; 2005; 2007; 2009; 2011; 2013; 2015; 2017; 2019; 2021; 2023; 2025; 2027; 2029

Thailand was the host nation for the 33rd SEA Games in Bangkok and Chonburi, which was held from 9 to 20 December 2025. The country was composed of 1,807 athletes in all 50 sports.

Songkhla province was supposed to co-host some events until Cyclone Senyar flooded the place, causing all events that were meant to be held in Songkhla to be transferred to Bangkok and Chonburi.

== Competitors ==
The following is the list of the number of competitors participating at the Games per sport/discipline.

Sport	Men	Women	Total
Athletics	46	34	80
Badminton	10	10	20
Baseball	28	4	32
Cricket	15	15	30
Football	23	23	46
Handball	18	18	36
Hockey5s	10	10	20
Polo	7	0	7
Sepak takraw	29	29	58
Total	186	143	329

== Medal summary ==
2025 SEA Games medal summary

=== Medal by sport ===
Sport	1st place, gold medalist(s)	2nd place, silver medalist(s)	3rd place, bronze medalist(s)	Total
3x3 basketball	1	1	0	2
Archery	2	1	2	5
Artistic swimming	2	1	1	4
Athletics	13	13	4	30
Badminton	3	2	1	6
Baseball	1	1	0	2
Basketball	0	2	0	2
Beach volleyball	0	2	0	2
Billiards	0	0	3	3
Bowling	0	3	1	4
Boxing	14	2	1	17
Canoeing	10	1	1	12
Chess	5	0	0	5
Cricket	2	0	0	2
Cycling	10	7	3	20
Diving	1	2	0	3
Dragon boat	0	4	1	5
Equestrian	3	2	1	6
Esports	2	1	0	3
Fencing	1	3	6	10
Field hockey	0	1	1	2
Figure skating	1	1	1	3
Floorball	2	0	0	2
Football	0	1	1	2
Futsal	0	1	1	2
Golf	4	1	1	6
Gymnastics	6	2	3	11
Handball	1	1	0	2
Hockey5s	1	0	1	2
Ice hockey	1	1	0	2
Indoor hockey	1	0	1	2
Jet skiing	5	4	1	10
Ju-jitsu	14	11	5	30
Judo	4	3	3	10
Kabaddi	4	1	1	6
Karate	4	5	2	11
Kickboxing	4	3	1	8
Kiteboarding	0	1	0	1
Modern pentathlon	2	0	3	5
Muaythai	11	6	1	18
Netball	0	0	1	1
Open water swimming	2	0	1	3
Pencak silat	3	4	3	10
Pétanque	5	4	1	10
Polo	1	1	0	2
Rowing	2	4	3	9
Rugby sevens	2	0	0	2
Sailing	5	1	2	8
Sepak takraw	6	3	2	11
Short-track speed skating	6	1	0	7
Shooting	6	8	6	20
Skateboarding	1	2	4	7
Snooker	6	4	0	10
Softball	0	0	2	2
Sport climbing	2	2	3	7
Swimming	5	7	9	21
Table tennis	3	2	2	7
Taekwondo	10	5	4	19
Tennis	3	7	1	11
Teqball	5	0	0	5
Volleyball	2	0	0	2
Wakeboarding	3	0	0	3
Water polo	1	0	1	2
Water skiing	0	0	1	1
Weightlifting	9	2	3	14
Windsurfing	3	1	0	4
Woodball	6	2	0	8
Wrestling	0	1	9	10
Wushu	1	2	2	5
Total	233	154	112	499

=== Medal by date ===
Medals by date
Date	1st place, gold medalist(s)	2nd place, silver medalist(s)	3rd place, bronze medalist(s)	Total
9 December	Opening ceremony			
10 December	19	13	9	41
11 December	22	11	5	38
12 December	25	19	14	58
13 December	30	17	11	57
14 December	36	18	8	62
15 December	13	9	13	35
16 December	15	13	6	34
17 December	25	20	14	59
18 December	12	10	13	35
19 December	36	24	19	79
Total	233	154	112	499

=== Medalists ===
Medal	Name	Sport	Event	Date
Gold	Benyapa Aimsaard; Pornpawee Chochuwong; Ratchanok Intanon; Ornnicha Jongsathapornparn; Supanida Katethong; Busanan Ongbamrungphan; Supissara Paewsampran; Jhenicha Sudjaipraparat; Sukitta Suwachai; Sapsiree Taerattanachai	Badminton	Women's Team	10 December
Gold	Pitipiboon Mahawattanangkul	Canoeing	Men's Canoe Single Slalom	10 December
Gold	Piyanath Koetsuk	Canoeing	Men's Kayak Single Slalom	10 December
Gold	Atcharaporn Duanglawa	Canoeing	Women's Canoe Single Slalom	10 December
Gold	Tinnakrit Arunnuntapanich; Warot Kananub; Tupfah Khumnorkaew; Worathep Timsri	Chess	Makruk Blitz Men's Triples	10 December
Gold	Methasit Boonsane	Cycling	Mountain Bike - Men's Downhill	10 December
Gold	Vipavee Deekaballes	Cycling	Mountain Bike - Women's Downhill	10 December
Gold	Thailand	Hockey 5s	Women's Team	10 December
Gold	Charatchai Kitpongsri; Warut Netpong	Ju-jitsu	Men's Duo Show	10 December
Gold	Suwijak Kuntong	Ju-jitsu	Men's Fighting -62kg	10 December
Gold	Suphawadee Kaeosrasaen; Kunsatri Kumsroi	Ju-jitsu	Women's Duo Show	10 December
Gold	Nunchanat Singchalad	Ju-jitsu	Women's Fighting -52kg	10 December
Gold	Orapa Senatham	Ju-jitsu	Women's Fighting -63kg	10 December
Gold	Lalita Chiaochan	Petanque	Women's Shooting	10 December
Gold	Aiyawatt Srivaddhanaprabha; Apichet Srivaddhanaprabha; Natthaphong Prathumlee; Thanasilp Chueawangkham; Sathit Wongkraso; Supachai Sukhampha; Phaitoon Khamta	Polo	Mixed 2-4 Goals	10 December
Gold	Nantipat Kirirattanachai; Komin Naonon; Supot Padungkan; Anuphat Phunirot; Jharuphong Piyasakphakkul; Sompol Rakchat	Sepak Takraw	Men's Hoop	10 December
Gold	Pimpika Moongsupeng; Arriya Namsomboon; Sujittra Nawasimma; Ketmanee Potjanit; Chawisa Raksachat; Warintorn Setraksa	Sepak Takraw	Women's Hoop	10 December
Gold	Kamonchanok Kwanmuang	Swimming	Women's 200m Butterfly	10 December
Gold	Watcharakul Limjitakorn	Taekwondo	Women's Freestyle Poomsae	10 December
Gold	Puripol Boonson	Athletics	100 m	11 December
Gold	Natcha Supavorased	Sport climbing	Women's boulder	14 December
Gold	Auswin Aueareechit	Sport climbing	Men's boulder	14 December
Silver	Aphinya Sroichit; Orasa Thiangkathok; Nootchanat Thoongpong	Canoeing	Women's Canoe Double 500m	10 December
Silver	Nawin Kokaew; Teeradet Polsuwan	Ju-jitsu	Men's Duo Show	10 December
Silver	Naphat Mathupan	Ju-jitsu	Men's Fighting -62kg	10 December
Silver	Chanwit Aunjai	Ju-jitsu	Men's Fighting -77kg	10 December
Silver	Kanyarat Phaophan; Panyaporn Phaophan	Ju-jitsu	Women's Duo Show	10 December
Silver	Suchanard Leakkhew	Ju-jitsu	Women's Fighting -63kg	10 December
Silver	Sirirat Khaithep	Petanque	Women's Single	10 December
Silver	Apisit Chaichana; Kittichai Khamsaenrach; Tawatchai Kongpakdee; Noppadon Kongthawthong; Dusit Piyawong; Eekkawee Ruenphara; Khanawut Rungrot; Thongchai Sombatkerd	Sepak Takraw - Chinlone	Men's Linking	10 December
Silver	Yaowares Chaichana; Yowvalux Jaisue; Pornpairin Paenthong; Jiraporn Palasri; Suwanna Petsamorn; Vimonthip Sawaingam; Suthida Thawantha; Suthida Upajanto	Sepak Takraw - Chinlone	Women's Linking	10 December
Silver	Jenjira Srisa-Ard	Swimming	Women's 50m Breastsroke	10 December
Silver	Atchariya Koedkaew	Taekwondo	Men's Freestyle Poomsae	10 December
Silver	Chonlakorn Chayawatto; Chutikarn Lapnitayapan; Ratchadawan Tapaenthong	Taekwondo	Women's Team Recognized Poomsae	10 December
Silver	Sasipha Chuphon; Thitaree Kaewolanwasu; Navin Pinthasute; Nattachai Sutha; Sarisa Thaitonglang; Peerapat Trakarnwichit	Taekwondo	Mixed Team Freestyle Poomsae	10 December
Silver	Auswin Aueareechit	Sport climbing	Men's lead	12 December
Silver	Ardch Intrachupongse	Sport climbing	Men's boulder	14 December
Bronze	Supak Jomkoh; Kittinupong Kedren; Ruttanapak Oupthong; Dechapol Puavaranukroh; Peeratchai Sukphun; Pakkapon Teeraratsakul; Panitchaphon Teeraratsakul; Kunlavut Vitidsarn; Kantaphon Wangcharoen; Wongsup Wongsup-in	Badminton	Men's Team	10 December
Bronze	Suthasinee Autnun; Wichan Jaitieng; Pornnapphan Phuangmaiming; Aditep Srichart; Panwad Thongnim; Nathaworn Waenphrom	Canoeing	Mixed Kayak Four 500m	10 December
Bronze	Kanokrat Ritthidet	Cycling	Mountain Bike - Women's Downhill	10 December
Bronze	Thailand	Hockey 5s	Men's Team	10 December
Bronze	Nutchaya Sugun	Ju-jitsu	Women's Fighting -52kg	10 December
Bronze	Akkrachai Meekhong	Petanque	Men's Single	10 December
Bronze	Saovanee Boonamphai	Swimming	Women's 50m Breastsroke	10 December
Bronze	Thana Kiewlailerd; Navin Pinthasute; Sippakorn Wetchakornpatiwong	Taekwondo	Men's Team Recognized Poomsae	10 December
Bronze	Chonlakorn Chayawatto; Thana Kiewlailerd	Taekwondo	Mixed Pair Recognized Poomsae	10 December
Bronze	Natcha Supavorased	Sport climbing	Women's lead	12 December
Bronze	Kanyanat Arsakit	Sport climbing	Women's speed	13 December
Bronze	Aphiwit Limpanichpakdee	Sport climbing	Men's speed	13 December

== 3x3 basketball ==
Team	Event	Preliminary Round				Semifinals	Final / BM	
Team	Event	Opposition Score	Opposition Score	Opposition Score	Rank	Opposition Score	Opposition Score	Rank
Thailand men's	Men's 3x3	Indonesia; W 20–17	Singapore; W 18–13	Myanmar; W 21–9	1 Q	Malaysia; W 21–11	Singapore; W 21–18	1st place, gold medalist(s)
Thailand women's	Women's 3x3	Vietnam; W 17–16	Singapore; W 19–12	Laos; W 22–2	1 Q	Malaysia; W 20–19	Indonesia; L 18–20	2nd place, silver medalist(s)

== Aquathlon ==
Athlete	Event	Final	
Athlete	Event	Time	Rank
Siraphob Kumpalanuwat; Kritsanaphon Phonphai; Thaninthorn Pornnarintip	Men's Team Relay	00:50:20	6
Pichayanat Kittivorakij; Suchaya Leenakul; Ramanya Phanridthidam	Women's Team Relay	00:58:04	6
Thitaree Khunnasitthakorn; Nithan Nirapienranant; Thamakorn Plengplang; Manita Tayana	Mixed Team Relay	01:17:41	6

== Archery ==
Athlete	Event	Preliminary		Round of 16	Quarterfinals	Semifinals	Final / BM	
Athlete	Event	Score	Rank	Opposition Result	Opposition Result	Opposition Result	Opposition Result	Rank
Sippakorn Kohkaew	Men's Individual Compound	697	6 Q	de la Cruz (PHI); W 144–142	Hidayat (INA); W 146–145	Peerawat (THA); L 147–149	Rinaldi (INA); W 142–138	3rd place, bronze medalist(s)
Peerawat Pattanapongkiat	Men's Individual Compound	704	2 Q	Vanlivong (LAO); W 148–136	Nguyễn (VIE); W 148–145	Sippakorn (THA); W 149–147	Mazuki (MAS); W 147–145	1st place, gold medalist(s)
Punamfa Chatkanjanarak	Men's Individual Recurve	654	10 Q	Naing (MYA); W 6–2	Agata (INA); L 1–7	Did not Advance		
Thitiwit Ketmak	Men's Individual Recurve	631	21	Did not Advance				
Tanapat Pathairat	Men's Individual Recurve	640	18 Q	Li (SGP); L 4–6	Did not Advance			
Aithiwat Soithong	Men's Individual Recurve	639	20	Did not Advance				
Sippakorn Kohkaew; Peerawat Pattanapongkiat; Ratanadanai Wongtana	Men's Team Compound	2095	1 Q	—N/a	Bye	Vietnam; W 233–230	Malaysia; L 229–232	2nd place, silver medalist(s)
Punamfa Chatkanjanarak; Tanapat Pathairat; Aithiwat Soithong	Men's Team Recurve	1933	4 Q	—N/a	Myanmar; W 6–2	Indonesia; L 3–5	Malaysia; L 3–5	4
Kanoknapus Kaewchomphu	Women's Individual Compound	683	10 Q	Low (SGP); L 141–144	Did not Advance			
Kanyavee Maneesombatkul	Women's Individual Compound	688	4 Q	Hla (MYA); W 145–135	Ong (SGP); L 142–148	Did not Advance		
Sataporn Artsalee	Women's Individual Recurve	625	16 Q	Tan (MAS); L 0–6	Did not Advance			
Punika Jongkraijak	Women's Individual Recurve	578	21	Did not Advance				
Chunyaphak Kanjana	Women's Individual Recurve	600	20	Did not Advance				
Kanyanat Wipadapisut	Women's Individual Recurve	616	18 Q	Triệu (VIE); L 1–7	Did not Advance			
Kanoknapus Kaewchomphu; Kanyavee Maneesombatkul; Kodchaporn Pratumsuwan	Women's Team Compound	2047	2 Q	—N/a	Bye	Singapore; L 225–228	Vietnam; W 223–218	3rd place, bronze medalist(s)
Sataporn Artsalee; Chunyaphak Kanjana; Kanyanat Wipadapisut	Women's Team Recurve	1841	5 Q	—N/a	Philippines; W 6–2	Indonesia; L 0–6	Vietnam; L 0–6	4
Kanyavee Maneesombatkul; Peerawat Pattanapongkiat	Mixed Team Compound	1392	2 Q	—N/a	Myanmar; W 156–145	Singapore; W 153–153(19)	Vietnam; W 147(20)–147(18)	1st place, gold medalist(s)
Sataporn Artsalee; Punamfa Chatkanjanarak	Mixed Team Recurve	1279	7 Q	—N/a	Vietnam; L 2–6	Did not Advance		

== Artistic swimming ==
Athlete	Event	Final				
Athlete	Event	Free	Technical	Champ	Total	Rank
Patrawee Chayawararak; Chantaras Jarupraditlert; Voranan Toomchay	Women's Duet	170.9258	210.9550	—N/a	381.8808	2nd place, silver medalist(s)
Jinnipha Adisaisiributr; Patrawee Chayawararak; Nannapat Duangprasert; Kanyanatt Kaewvisit; Pongpimporn Pongsuwan; Getsarin Sawangarom; Supitchaya Songpan; Voranan Toomchay	Women's Team	235.6296	222.4217	627.5551	—N/a	1st place, gold medalist(s)
Kantinan Adisaisiributr; Pongpimporn Pongsuwan; Supitchaya Songpan	Mixed Duet	262.7746	184.5709	—N/a	447.3455	1st place, gold medalist(s)
Chantaras Jarupraditlert; Wattikorn Khethirankanok; Nichapa Takiennut	Mixed Duet	183.0934	126.0300	—N/a	309.1234	3rd place, bronze medalist(s)

== Athletics ==
Track and road events

Athlete	Event	Heat		Final	
Athlete	Event	Time	Rank	Time	Rank
Puripol Boonson	Men's 100m	9.94	1 Q	10.00	1st place, gold medalist(s)
Thawatchai Himaiad	Men's 100m	10.35	3 Q	10.37	5
Puripol Boonson	Men's 200m	20.61	1 Q	20.07	1st place, gold medalist(s)
Thawatchai Himaiad	Men's 200m	20.90	4 Q	20.77	4
Joshua Robert Atkinson	Men's 400m	46.63	1 Q	45.13	1st place, gold medalist(s)
Sarawut Nuansi	Men's 400m	47.31	2 Q	46.26	4
Joshua Robert Atkinson	Men's 800m	1:51.58	2 Q	1:49.24	2nd place, silver medalist(s)
Wathin Choenchom	Men's 800m	1:55.37	12	Did not advance	
Kieran Tuntivate	Men's 1500m	—N/a		3:47.50	1st place, gold medalist(s)
Pongsakorn Suksawat	Men's 5000m	—N/a		16:01.97	9
Kieran Tuntivate	Men's 5000m	—N/a		14:46.38	1st place, gold medalist(s)
Anucha Pada	Men's 10000m	—N/a		36:59.17	11
Kieran Tuntivate	Men's 10000m	—N/a		29:41.81	1st place, gold medalist(s)
Natthaphon Dunsungnoen	Men's 110m Hurdles	—N/a		DNF	
Sutthahathai Phrmbut	Men's 110m Hurdles	—N/a		14.03	4
Patiphon Samnee	Men's 400m Hurdles	—N/a		DNS	
Jessada Somduan	Men's 3000m Steeplechase	—N/a		10:19.96	6
Jessada Tanes	Men's 3000m Steeplechase	—N/a		10:19.65	5
Puripol Boonson; Soraoat Dapbang; Thawatchai Hiemiat; Chayut Khongprasit	Men's 4 × 100m Relay	—N/a		38.28	1st place, gold medalist(s)
Joshua Robert Atkinson; Khunaphat Kaijan; Sarawut Nuansi; Jirayu Pleenaram	Men's 4 × 400m Relay	—N/a		3:03.07	1st place, gold medalist(s)
Artid Sriwichai	Men's 20km Race Walk	—N/a		01:41:01	4
Isoon Wangsapnoy	Men's 20km Race Walk	—N/a		DSQ	
Nattawut Innum	Men's Marathon	—N/a		02:39:04	5
Sanchai Namkhet	Men's Marathon	—N/a		02:48:52	8

Athlete	Event	Heat		Final	
Athlete	Event	Time	Rank	Time	Rank
Jirapat Khanonta	Women's 100m	11.69	2 Q	11.54	2nd place, silver medalist(s)
Supanich Poolkerd	Women's 100m	11.57	1 Q	11.61	4
Athicha Phetkun	Women's 200m	DNS			
Supanich Poolkerd	Women's 200m	23.77	4 Q	23.85	4
Chinenye Josephine Onuorah	Women's 400m	—N/a		52.93	2nd place, silver medalist(s)
Benny Nontanam	Women's 400m	—N/a		54.02	4
Ruedee Netthai	Women's 800m	—N/a		2:13.0	6
Pareeya Sonsem	Women's 1500m	—N/a		4:42.77	4
Pareeya Sonsem	Women's 5000m	—N/a		18:08.58	6
Pareeya Sonsem	Men's 10000m	—N/a		28:06.19	5
Arisa Weruwanarak	Women's 100m Hurdles	—N/a		13.79	5
Arisa Weruwanarak	Women's 400m Hurdles	—N/a		61.28	4
Jirapat Khanonta; Sukanda Petraksa; Supanich Poolkerd; Manatsada Sanmano	Women's 4 × 100m Relay	—N/a		43.88	1st place, gold medalist(s)
Benny Nontanam; Chinenye Josephine Onuorah; Montida Thongprachukaew; Arisa Weruwanarak	Women's 4 × 400m Relay	—N/a		3:36.87	2nd place, silver medalist(s)
Nittaya Rodphangthiam	Women's 20km Race Walk	—N/a		02:10:16	8
Kotchaphon Tangsrivong	Women's 20km Race Walk	—N/a		01:48:15	3rd place, bronze medalist(s)
Linda Janthachit	Women's Marathon	—N/a		DNF	
Ornanong Wongsorn	Women's Marathon	—N/a		03:15:47	7

Athlete	Event	Final	
Athlete	Event	Time	Rank
Piraya Bunjing; Methawi Kanhaaudom; Adison Phisanthia; Namchok Phuphaeng; Phichayapha Sukaue; Montida Thongprachukaew	Mixed 4 × 400m Relay	3:16.56	2nd place, silver medalist(s)

Field events

Athlete	Event	Final	
Athlete	Event	Result	Position
Tawan Kaeodam	Men's High Jump	2.22	1st place, gold medalist(s)
Pran Jadsadangkun Na Ayutthaya	Men's Long Jump	6.62	11
Punyaphat Meebooniad	Men's Long Jump	NM	
Phumiphat Khunmangkon	Men's Triple Jump	15.17	9
Nattapong Srinonta	Men's Triple Jump	15.71	6
Patsapong Amsam-ang	Men's Pole Vault	5.70	2nd place, silver medalist(s)
Graiwich Panyasawat	Men's Pole Vault	5.00	5
Eakkarin Boonlap	Men's Shot Put	16.26	4
Thongchai Silamool	Men's Shot Put	16.80	2nd place, silver medalist(s)
Bandit Singhatongkul	Men's Discus Throw	49.71	5
Kiadpradid Srisai	Men's Discus Throw	53.82	2nd place, silver medalist(s)
Kittipong Boonmawan	Men's Hammer Throw	63.11	1st place, gold medalist(s)
Thongchai Silamool	Men's Hammer Throw	57.46	4
Kittipong Janduang	Men's Javelin Throw	64.71	6
Wachirawit Sornwichai	Men's Javelin Throw	69.62	3rd place, bronze medalist(s)

Athlete	Event	Final	
Athlete	Event	Result	Position
Sanchanok Samaimai	Women's High Jump	1.65	5
Supawat Choothong	Women's Long Jump	6.06	5
Suphawadi Intathueng	Women's Long Jump	5.80	8
Parinya Chuaimaroeng	Women's Triple Jump	13.79	2nd place, silver medalist(s)
Chayanisa Chomchuendee	Women's Pole Vault	3.90	3rd place, bronze medalist(s)
Chonthicha Khabut	Women's Pole Vault	4.05	2nd place, silver medalist(s)
Subenrat Insaeng	Women's Shot Put	11.16	6
Areerat Intadis	Women's Shot Put	16.04	2nd place, silver medalist(s)
Subenrat Insaeng	Women's Discus Throw	58.86	1st place, gold medalist(s)
Paphatson Loain	Women's Discus Throw	41.64	6
Sawitree Kaewasuksri	Women's Hammer Throw	56.27	3rd place, bronze medalist(s)
Mingkamon Koomphon	Women's Hammer Throw	60.74	2nd place, silver medalist(s)
Panatsaya Meesin	Women's Javelin Throw	46.21	6
Jariya Wichaidit	Women's Javelin Throw	55.64	1st place, gold medalist(s)

Combined events

Athlete	Event	100m	Long jump	Shot put	High jump	400m	110 hurdles	Discus throw	Pole vault	Javelin throw	1500m	Total	Rank
Teerapat Pukdeeauxsorn	Men's Decathlon	834; 11.12	736; 6.67	498; 10.20	714; 1.90	648; 53.80	654; 16.72	424; 27.93	731; 4.40	528; 45.92	217; 6:12.18	5984	6
Sutthisak Singkhon	Men's Decathlon	806; 11.25	720; 6.60	738; 14.15	740; 1.93	761; 51.17	784; 15.55	558; 34.70	562; 3.80	608; 51.30	372; 5:35.57	6649	2nd place, silver medalist(s)

== Badminton ==
Athlete	Event	Round of 16	Quarter-finals	Semi-finals	Final	Rank
Athlete	Event	Opponent Score	Opponent Score	Opponent Score	Opponent Score	Rank
Panitchaphon Teeraratsakul	Men's Singles	Phone (MYA); W (21–9, 21–10)	Leong (MAS); L (18–21, 16–21)	Did not advance		
Kantaphon Wangcharoen	Men's Singles	Hien (MYA); W (21–10, 21–13)	Hoh (MAS); L (15–21, 17–21)	Did not advance		
Supak Jomkoh; Kittinupong Kedren	Men's Doubles	Luangamath / Sokthavy (LAO); W (21–7, 21–17)	Chia / Soh (MAS); L (16–21, 16–21)	Did not advance		
Peeratchai Sukphun; Pakkapon Teeraratsakul	Men's Doubles	Outhaithani / Phichith (LAO); W (21–6, 21–7)	Man / Tee (MAS); L (16–21, 19–21)	Did not advance		
Supak Jomkoh; Kittinupong Kedren; Ruttanapak Oupthong; Dechapol Puavaranukroh; Peeratchai Sukphun; Pakkapon Teeraratsakul; Panitchaphon Teeraratsakul; Kunlavut Vitidsarn; Kantaphon Wangcharoen; Wongsup Wongsup-in	Men's Team	—N/a	Myanmar; W 3–0	Malaysia; L 1–3	Did not advance	3rd place, bronze medalist(s)
Ratchanok Intanon	Women's Singles	Thet (MYA); W (21–15, 21–14)	Rei (PHI); W (21–12, 21–10)	Wong (MAS); W (21–11, 18–21, 21–17)	Supanida (THA); W (21–19, 21–7)	1st place, gold medalist(s)
Supanida Katethong	Women's Singles	Vũ (VIE); W (21–19, 21–7)	De Guzman (PHI); W (21–12, 24–22)	Wardani (INA); W (21–18, 21–16)	Intanon (THA); L (19–21, 7–21)	2nd place, silver medalist(s)
Benyapa Aimsaard; Sapsiree Taerattanachai	Women's Doubles	Inlayo / Pinlac (PHI); W (21–16, 21–13)	Muralitharan / Tan (MAS); L (11–21, 14–21)	Did not advance		
Orninicha Jongsathapornparn; Sukitta Suwachai	Women's Doubles	Bùi / Vũ (VIE); L (20–22, 22–20, 17–21)	Did not advance			
Benyapa Aimsaard; Pornpawee Chochuwong; Ratchanok Intanon; Ornnicha Jongsathapornparn; Supanida Katethong; Busanan Ongbamrungphan; Supissara Paewsampran; Jhenicha Sudjaipraparat; Sukitta Suwachai; Sapsiree Taerattanachai	Women's Team	—N/a	Bye	Singapore; W 3–0	Indonesia; W 3–1	1st place, gold medalist(s)
Ruttanapak Oupthong; Jhenicha Sudjaipraparat	Mixed Doubles	Bye	Hernandez / Villabrille (PHI); W (19–21, 21–10, 21–5)	Chen / Toh (MAS); W (21–15, 21–16)	Dechapol / Supissara (THA); W (21–20, 21–19)	1st place, gold medalist(s)
Supissara Paewsampran; Dechapol Puavaranukroh	Mixed Doubles	Bye	Cheng / Hoo (MAS); W (21–12, 21–15)	Hidayatullah / Pasaribu (INA); W (21–17, 21–15)	Jhenicha / Ruttanapak (THA); L (20–21, 19–21)	2nd place, silver medalist(s)

== Baseball ==
Team	Event	Round-robin							Final / BM	
Team	Event	Opposition Score	Opposition Score	Opposition Score	Opposition Score	Opposition Score	Opposition Score	Rank	Opposition Score	Rank
Thailand	Men's Baseball	Vietnam; W 16–0	Laos; W 12–1	Indonesia; W 10–1	Singapore; W 6–4	Philippines; L 7–8	Malaysia; W 17–3	2 Q	Philippines; L 3–5	2nd place, silver medalist(s)
Thailand	Baseball5	Vietnam; W 2–0	Malaysia; W 2–0	Indonesia; W 2–0	—N/a			1 Q	Indonesia; W 2–0	1st place, gold medalist(s)

== Basketball ==
Team	Event	Preliminary Round				Quarterfinals	Semifinals	Final / BM	
Team	Event	Opposition Score	Opposition Score	Opposition Score	Rank	Opposition Score	Opposition Score	Opposition Score	Rank
Thailand men's	Men's Tournament	Singapore; W 84–37	Indonesia; W 71–67	Myanmar; W 133–38	1 Q	Bye	Malaysia; W 86–55	Philippines; L 64–70	2nd place, silver medalist(s)
Thailand women's	Women's Tournament	Indonesia; W 60–55	Vietnam; W 89–46	—N/a	1 Q	Bye	Malaysia; W 59–51	Philippines; L 70–73	2nd place, silver medalist(s)

== Beach volleyball ==
Team	Event	Preliminary round						Semifinal	Final / BM	
Team	Event	Opposition Score	Opposition Score	Opposition Score	Opposition Score	Opposition Score	Rank	Opposition Score	Opposition Score	Rank
Thailand	Men's Team	Malaysia; W 2–0	Singapore; W 2–0	—N/a			1 Q	Vietnam; W 2–0	Indonesia; L 1–2	2nd place, silver medalist(s)
Thailand	Women's Team	Malaysia; W 2–0	Indonesia; W 2–0	Vietnam; W 2–0	Singapore; W 2–0	Philippines; W 2–0	1 Q	—N/a	Philippines; L 0–2	2nd place, silver medalist(s)

== Billiards ==
Athlete	Event	Quarterfinals	Semifinals	Final	
Athlete	Event	Opposition Result	Opposition Result	Opposition Result	Rank
Praprut Chaithanasakun	Men's Single	Aung Htay (MYA); W 3–1	Gilchrist (SGP); L 2–3	Did not advance	3rd place, bronze medalist(s)
Yuttapop Pakpoj	Men's Single	Setiadi (INA); W 3–0	Pauk (MYA); L 2–3	Did not advance	3rd place, bronze medalist(s)
Praprut Chaithanasakun; Yuttapop Pakpoj; Thawat Sujaritthurakarn	Men's Team	—N/a	Singapore; L 1–3	Did not advance	3rd place, bronze medalist(s)

== Bowling ==
Team	Event	Preliminary Round		Quarterfinals	Semifinals	Final	
Team	Event	Score	Rank	Opposition Score	Opposition Score	Opposition Score	Rank
Napat Buspanikonkul	Men's Singles	1227	9 Q	Chia (SGP); W 246–227	Syazirol (MAS); W 211–210	Trần (VIE); L 210–235	2nd place, silver medalist(s)
Lapasdanai Chusaeng	Men's Singles	1112	22	Did not advance			
Vilinkorn Kledkaew	Men's Singles	1061	24	Did not advance			
Supakrit Wantasuk	Men's Singles	1223	10 Q	Syazirol (MAS); L 180–215	Did not advance		
Lapasdanai Chusaeng; Vilinkorn Kledkaew	Men's Doubles	2625	2 Q	Muhammad / Ramadona (INA); W 407–399	Ameerul / Tsen (MAS); W 450–389	Rafiq / Syazirol (MAS); L 435–470	2nd place, silver medalist(s)
Napat Buspanikonkul; Supakrit Wantasuk	Men's Doubles	2556	4 Q	Rafiq / Syazirol (MAS); L 480–482	Did not advance		
Napat Buspanikonkul; Lapasdanai Chusaeng; Vilinkorn Kledkaew; Supakrit Wantasuk	Men's Team of 4	4965	3 Q	—N/a	Singapore; W 878–876	Philippines; L 865–981	2nd place, silver medalist(s)
Pinmanus Khumchaipoom	Women's Singles	1145	17	Did not advance			
Phattaranan Pingchittapraphai	Women's Singles	1162	15	Did not advance			
Ramita Sarntong	Women's Singles	1196	12	Did not advance			
Chawakorn Wutti	Women's Singles	1281	4 Q	Pee (SGP); L 204–196	Did not advance		
Ramita Sarntong; Chawakorn Wutti	Women's Doubles	2192	9	Did not advance			
Pinmanus Khumchaipoom; Phattaranan Pingchittapraphai	Women's Doubles	2119	10	Did not advance			
Pinmanus Khumchaipoom; Phattaranan Pingchittapraphai; Ramita Sarntong; Chawakorn Wutti	Women's Team of 4	4658	4 Q	—N/a	Malaysia; L 817–855	Did not advance	3rd place, bronze medalist(s)

== Boxing ==
Athlete	Event	Quarterfinals	Semifinals	Final	
Athlete	Event	Opposition Result	Opposition Result	Opposition Result	Rank
Thitiwat Phlongaurai	Men's Light Flyweight	Koebanu (INA); W 5–0	Khamsathone (LAO); W RSC	Baricuatro (PHI); W 4–1	1st place, gold medalist(s)
Thitisan Panmod	Men's Flyweight	Bye	Heuangthisouan (LAO); W RSC	Tahumil (INA); L 2–3	2nd place, silver medalist(s)
Thanarat Saengphet	Men's Bantamweight	Trần (VIE); W 5–0	Wahidi (MAS); W 5–0	Jara (PHI); W 5–0	1st place, gold medalist(s)
Sarawut Sukthet	Men's Featherweight	Bautista (PHI); W 5–0	Haikal (MAS); W 5–0	Nguyễn (VIE); W 5–0	1st place, gold medalist(s)
Sakda Ruamtham	Men's Lightweight	Ogayre (PHI); W 5–0	Caelan (SGP); W 5–0	Udin (INA); W 5–0	1st place, gold medalist(s)
Khunatip Pidnuch	Men's Light Welterweight	—N/a	Xayaseng (LAO); W RSC	Gaio (TLS); W 5–0	1st place, gold medalist(s)
Bunjong Sinsiri	Men's Welterweight	Aiman (MAS); W 5–0	Fajardo (PHI); W 5–0	Tan (SGP); W 4–1	1st place, gold medalist(s)
Weerapon Jongjoho	Men's Middleweight	Aziz (MAS); W 5–0	Gaspar (TLS); W RSC	Bùi (VIE); W 5–0	1st place, gold medalist(s)
Jakkapong Yomkhot	Men's Light Heavyweight	Bye	Muskita (INA); L 1–4	Did not advanced	3rd place, bronze medalist(s)
Thipsatcha Yodwaree	Women's Light Flyweight	Barros (TLS); W RSC	Mathialagan (SGP); W 3–2	Ngô (VIE); W 4–1	1st place, gold medalist(s)
Chuthamat Raksat	Women's Flyweight	Nguyễn (VIE); W 5–0	Saweho (INA); W 4–1	Villegas (PHI); W 5–0	1st place, gold medalist(s)
Natnicha Chongprongklang	Women's Bantamweight	Bye	Võ (VIE); W 4–1	Maharani (INA); W 4–1	1st place, gold medalist(s)
Punrawee Ruenros	Women's Featherweight	—N/a	Manopo (INA); W 5–0	Nguyễn (VIE); W 5–0	1st place, gold medalist(s)
Apisada Tantawa	Women's Lightweight	Kiim (MYA); W RSC	Pasuit (PHI); W 5–0	Hà (VIE); L 0–5	2nd place, silver medalist(s)
Thananya Somnuek	Women's Light Welterweight	—N/a	Bye	Hasanah (INA); W 4–0	1st place, gold medalist(s)
Janjaem Suwannapheng	Women's Welterweight	—N/a	Kay (MYA); W 5–0	Warden (SGP); W 5–0	1st place, gold medalist(s)
Baison Manikon	Women's Light Middleweight	—N/a	Bacyadan (PHI); W 4–0	Hoàng (VIE); W 4–1	1st place, gold medalist(s)

== Canoeing ==
Athlete	Event	Preliminary		Final	
Athlete	Event	Time	Rank	Time	Rank
Pitpiboon Mahawattanangkul	Men's Canoe Single 500 m	2:09.331	2 Q	1:58.314	1st place, gold medalist(s)
Pitpiboon Mahawattanangkul; Mongkhonchai Sisong	Men's Canoe Double 200 m	38.852	1 Q	38.820	1st place, gold medalist(s)
Praison Buasamrong; Aditep Srichart	Men's Kayak Double 200 m	35.633	1 Q	33.583	1st place, gold medalist(s)
Piyawat Chaithong; Wittaya Hongkaeo; Pitpiboon Mahawattanangkul; Mongkhonchai Sisong	Men's Canoe Four 200 m	35.678	1 Q	34.223	1st place, gold medalist(s)
Praison Buasamrong; Methasit Sitthipharat; Aditep Srichart; Nathaworn Waenphrom	Men's Kayak Four 200 m	33.538	1 Q	30.540	1st place, gold medalist(s)
Yutthakan Chaidet	Men's Canoe Single Slalom	—N/a		84.52	1st place, gold medalist(s)
Chonlasit Phuttraksa	Men's Canoe Single Slalom	—N/a		89.07	2
Piyanath Koetsuk	Men's Kayak Single Slalom	—N/a		85.25	1st place, gold medalist(s)
Janyawut Mangjit	Men's Kayak Single Slalom	—N/a		134.45	6
Aphinya Sroichit; Orasa Thiangkathok	Women's Canoe Double 200 m	45.237	3 Q	43.429	1st place, gold medalist(s)
Aphinya Sroichit; Orasa Thiangkathok	Women's Canoe Double 500 m	2:18.803	3 Q	2:09.783	2nd place, silver medalist(s)
Kanda Chomkogsung	Women's Canoe Single Slalom	—N/a		104.67	3
Atcharaporn Duanglawa	Women's Canoe Single Slalom	—N/a		96.06	1st place, gold medalist(s)
Rungthip Kumrat	Women's Kayak Single Slalom	—N/a		97.77	2
Jaruwan Niamthong	Women's Kayak Single Slalom	—N/a		85.52	1st place, gold medalist(s)
Praison Buasamrong; Panwad Thongnim	Mixed Kayak Double 200 m	37.628	2 Q	39.292	4
Pornnapphan Phuangmaiming; Methasit Sitthipharat	Mixed Kayak Double 500 m	1:57.155	2 Q	1:51.335	4
Wichan Jaitieng; Pornnapphan Phuangmaiming; Panwad Thongnim; Nathaworn Waenphrom	Mixed Kayak Four 500 m	1:43.097	2 Q	1:39.209	3rd place, bronze medalist(s)

== Chess ==
Athlete	Event	Preliminary Round			Semifinal	Final	
Athlete	Event	Score	Score	Rank	Opposition Score	Opposition Score	Rank
Tinnakrit Arunnuntapanich; Warot Kananub; Tupfah Khumnorkaew; Worathep Timsri	Makruk Team Men Triple Blitz	23	—N/a	1 Q	Vietnam; W 6–0	Indonesia; W 4.5–1.5	1st place, gold medalist(s)
Boonsueb Saeheng; Pairoj Suwan; Jongkol Tayang; Wisuwat Teerapabpaisit; Worathep Timsri	Makruk Team Men Rapid	14.5	—N/a	1 Q	Singapore; W 2.5–1.5	Vietnam; W 2.5–1.5	1st place, gold medalist(s)
Tinnakrit Arunnuntapanich; Warot Kananub; Danuphop Sangsuwan; Pairoj Suwan; Worathep Timsri	ASEAN Chess Team Men Rapid	14	—N/a	1 Q	Indonesia; W 2.5–1.5	Philippines; W 2.5–1.5	1st place, gold medalist(s)
Jonathan Bodemar; Thanadon Kulpruethanon; Prin Laohawirapap	Chess Double Men Rapid	4	—N/a	5	Did not advance		
Boonsueb Saeheng; Nut Sutthithamwasi; Wisuwat Teerapabpaisit	Makruk Team Men Double Standard	5	6	1 Q	Indonesia; W 2.5–1.5	Philippines; W 1.5–0.5	1st place, gold medalist(s)
Sirin Bootsumran; Sarocha Chuemsakul; Thip-aksorn Inthasoi; Siriwan Samphaothong; Sirikan Sukpancharoen	ASEAN Chess Team Women Rapid	10	—N/a	5	Did not advance		
Natrada Kaewwattha; Araya Prommuang	Chess Double Women Rapid	4.5	—N/a	6	Did not advance		
Suchart Chaivichit; Warot Kananub; Boonsueb Sae-Heng; Siriwan Samphaothong; Nut Sutthithamwasi; Wisuwat Teerapabpaisit	Makruk Mixed Team Standard	9.5	18	1 Q	Philippines; W 6–4	Vietnam; W 3–2	1st place, gold medalist(s)

== Cricket ==
Team	Event	Group Stage					Semi-finals	Final / BM	
Team	Event	Opposition Score	Opposition Score	Opposition Score	Opposition Score	Rank	Opposition Score	Opposition Score	Rank
Thailand men's	Men's T10	Indonesia; L 70/7–71/3 lost by 7 wickets	Philippines; L 80/7–87/4 lost by 7 runs	Malaysia; L 57/7–59/1 lost by 9 wickets	Singapore; W 91/2–85/8 won by 8 wickets	—N/a	—N/a		5
Thailand men's	Men's T20	Indonesia; L 80/9–81/5 lost by 5 wickets	Singapore; L 152/9–156/8 lost by 4 runs	Malaysia; L 62–67/2 lost by 8 wickets	Philippines; L 153/7–156/9 lost by 1 wicket	—N/a	—N/a		5
Thailand women's	Women's T10	Singapore; W 12/0–9 won by 10 wickets	Indonesia; W 46/1–45/7 won by 9 wickets	—N/a		1 Q	Malaysia; W 82/2–31/6 won by 51 runs	Indonesia; W 41/1–40/6 won by 5 wickets	1st place, gold medalist(s)
Thailand women's	Women's T20	Myanmar; W 76/1–75/9 won by 9 wickets	Singapore; W 259/4–33 won by 226 runs	—N/a		1 Q	Indonesia; W 144/8–70 won by 74 runs	Malaysia; W 59/3–58/8 won by 7 wickets	1st place, gold medalist(s)

== Cycling ==
BMX

Athlete	Event	Final				
Athlete	Event	Moto1	Moto2	Moto3	Time	Rank
Komet Sukprasert	BMX Time Trial	—N/a			34.526	1st place, gold medalist(s)
Putthaphum Nakpaen	BMX Time Trial	—N/a			35.568	2nd place, silver medalist(s)
Komet Sukprasert	BMX Racing	34.733	34.996	34.942	—N/a	1st place, gold medalist(s)
Putthaphum Nakpaen	BMX Racing	35.123	35.949	35.410	—N/a	2nd place, silver medalist(s)

Mountain biking

Athlete	Event	Preliminary		Final	
Athlete	Event	Time	Rank	Time	Rank
Watcharakorn Onthuree	Men's Cross Country Eliminator	43.800	1 Q	—	4
Phunsiri Sirimongkhon	Men's Cross Country Eliminator	45.215	2 Q	—	5
Chitiphat Arsa	Men's Downhill	—N/a		02:47.162	5
Methasit Boonsane	Men's Downhill	—N/a		02:37.856	1st place, gold medalist(s)
Vipavee Deekaballes	Women's Downhill	—N/a		03:03.289	1st place, gold medalist(s)
Kanokrat Ritthidet	Women's Downhill	—N/a		03:06.778	3rd place, bronze medalist(s)

Track

Athlete	Event	Final	
Athlete	Event	Time	Rank
Jai Angsuthasawit	Men's Keirin	11.023	2nd place, silver medalist(s)
Norasetthada Bunma	Men's Keirin	11.089	3rd place, bronze medalist(s)
Turakit Boonratanathanakorn	Men's Points Race	38	1st place, gold medalist(s)
Isaiah Judah Thompson	Men's Points Race	–49	8
Putipong Chaloemsrimueang; Nattakrit Kaeonoi; Thak Kaeonoi; Warut Paekrathok	Men's Team Pursuit	3:23.879	2nd place, silver medalist(s)
Jai Angsuthasawit; NNorasetthada Bunma; Yeaunyong Petcharat	Men's Team Sprint	1:00.700	2nd place, silver medalist(s)
Jutatip Maneephan	Women's Scratch	—	4

Road

Athlete	Event	Final	
Athlete	Event	Time	Rank
Thanakhan Chaiyasombat	Men's Individual Time Trial	1:08:25	4
Peerapol Chawchiangkwang	Men's Individual Time Trial	1:07:28	1st place, gold medalist(s)
Thanakhan Chaiyasombat	Men's Individual Road Race	4:13:41	5
Peerapol Chawchiangkwang	Men's Individual Road Race	4:13:56	7
Navuti Liphongyu	Men's Individual Road Race	4:44:55	33
Sarawut Sirironnacha	Men's Individual Road Race	4:13.05	1st place, gold medalist(s)
Ratchanon Yaowarat	Men's Individual Road Race	4:32:21	25
Thanakhan Chaiyasombat; Peerapol Chawchiangkwang; Navuti Liphongyu; Sarawut Sirironnacha; Tullatorn Sosalam	Men's Team Time Trial	1:14:31	2nd place, silver medalist(s)
Thanakhan Chaiyasombat; Peerapol Chawchiangkwang; Nattapol Jumchat; Sarawut Sirironnacha; Ratchanon Yaowarat	Men's Team Road Race	12:40:42	1st place, gold medalist(s)
Chaniporn Batriya	Women's Individual Time Trial	1:02:40	3rd place, bronze medalist(s)
Phetdarin Somrat	Women's Individual Time Trial	1:02:32	2nd place, silver medalist(s)
Chaniporn Batriya	Women's Individual Road Race	3:56:20	11
Kamonrada Khaoplot	Women's Individual Road Race	3:56:31	16
Jutatip Maneephan	Women's Individual Road Race	3:56:20	1st place, gold medalist(s)
Chanpeng Nontasin	Women's Individual Road Race	3:56:40	20
Phetdarin Somrat	Women's Individual Road Race	3:56:28	13
Chaniporn Batriya	Women's Criterium	—	14
Jutatip Maneephan	Women's Criterium	—	1st place, gold medalist(s)
Supaksorn Nuntana	Women's Criterium	—	13

== Diving ==
Athlete	Event	Final	
Athlete	Event	Score	Rank
Chawanwat Juntaphadawon	Men's 1m Springboard	357.8	2nd place, silver medalist(s)
Thitiwut Phoemphun	Men's 1m Springboard	240.75	9
Chawanwat Juntaphadawon	Men's 3m Springboard	378.30	1st place, gold medalist(s)
Thitipoom Marksin	Men's 3m Springboard	351.75	6
Chawanwat Juntaphadawon; Thitipoom Marksin	Men's Synchronized 3m Springboard	335.70	2nd place, silver medalist(s)
Khakhanang Merbah; Natchapapar Thananikkun	Women's Synchronized Platform	186.69	6

== Dragon boat ==
Athlete	Event	Final			
Athlete	Event	Round 1	Round 2	Total	Rank
Thailand	Men's Small Boat 200 m	00:46.304	00:46.584	01:32.888	2nd place, silver medalist(s)
Thailand	Men's Small Boat 500 m	02:00.648	02:03.636	04:04.284	2nd place, silver medalist(s)
Thailand	Women's Small Boat 200 m	00:52.790	00:52.675	01:45.465	3rd place, bronze medalist(s)
Thailand	Women's Small Boat 500 m	02:21.448	02:18.493	04:33.941	4
Thailand	Mixed Standard Boat 200 m	00:43.526	00:42.986	01:26.512	2nd place, silver medalist(s)
Thailand	Mixed Standard Boat 500 m	01:53.179	01:53.856	03:47.035	2nd place, silver medalist(s)

== Duathlon ==
Athlete	Event	Final	
Athlete	Event	Time	Rank
Chappawit Manaso; Chanchai Saelee; Warut Suwancheep	Men's Team Relay	01:09:02	5
Kullanit Namjaisuk; Kankamol Sangkaew; Jakkaphong Siangwong; Pongsatorn Worranet	Mixed Team Relay	01:40:29	6

== Equestrian ==
Athlete	Event	Preliminary		Final	
Athlete	Event	Round 1	Round 2	Score	Rank
Arinadtha Chavatanont	Mixed Individual Dressage	68.588	63.000	Did not advance	
Nynn Puttisombat	Mixed Individual Dressage	69.235	69.353	70.410	3rd place, bronze medalist(s)
Pawarisa Thongpradup	Mixed Individual Dressage	69.530	69.471	71.135	2nd place, silver medalist(s)
Chalermcharn Yotviriyapanit	Mixed Individual Dressage	68.559	66.177	Did not advance	
Arinadtha Chavatanont; Nynn Puttisombat; Pawarisa Thongpradup; Chalermcharn Yotviriyapanit	Mixed Team Dressage	—N/a		207.353	1st place, gold medalist(s)
Arinadtha Chavatanont	Mixed Individual Eventing	—N/a		36.2	5
Nathasha Mekarapiruk	Mixed Individual Eventing	—N/a		32.5	4
Korntawat Samran	Mixed Individual Eventing	—N/a		24.7	1st place, gold medalist(s)
Sunsinee Thaicharoen	Mixed Individual Eventing	—N/a		31.4	2nd place, silver medalist(s)
Arinadtha Chavatanont; Nathasha Mekarapiruk; Korntawat Samran; Somjai Sanhom; Sunsinee Thaicharoen	Mixed Team Eventing	—N/a		88.6	1st place, gold medalist(s)
Anchisa Jamsa	Mixed Individual Jumping	66.44	83.81	74.07	5
Akkara Konglapamnuay	Mixed Individual Jumping	69.76	85.06	Did not advance	
Jaruporn Limpichati	Mixed Individual Jumping	69.75	87.12	76.66	6
Chatchaphat Ratanaphichetchai	Mixed Individual Jumping	70.84	105.65	Did not advance	
Anchisa Jamsa; Akkara Konglapamnuay; Jaruporn Limpichati; Chatchaphat Ratanaphichetchai	Mixed Team Jumping	—N/a		207.04	4

== Esports ==
Team	Event	Preliminary round				Quarterfinals	Semifinal	Repechage	Final	
Team	Event	Opposition Score	Opposition Score	Opposition Score	Rank	Opposition Score	Opposition Score	Opposition Score	Opposition Score	Rank
Thailand	Men's Arena of Valor	Laos; W 2–0	Philippines; W 2–0	Vietnam; W 2–0	1 Q	—N/a	Vietnam; L 2–3	Laos; W 4–0	Vietnam; L 2–4	2nd place, silver medalist(s)
Thailand	Men's Mobile Legends: Bang Bang	Timor-Leste; W 2–0	Vietnam; L 0–2	Myanmar; L 0–2	3 Q	Malaysia; L 0–3	Did not advance			
Thailand	Women's Arena of Valor	Timor-Leste; W 2–0	Vietnam; L 0–2	Laos; W 2–0	2 Q	—N/a	Vietnam; L 0–2	Laos; L DSQ	Did not advance	
Thailand	Women's Mobile Legends: Bang Bang	Vietnam; L 0–2	Laos; D 1–1	Philippines; L 0–2	4	Did not advance				
Thailand	Mixed EA Sports FC Online	Malaysia; W 3–2	Timor-Leste; W 3–0	—N/a	1 Q	Bye	Indonesia; W 3–2	—N/a	Vietnam; W 4–1	1st place, gold medalist(s)

Athlete	Event	Final 1							Final 2							Rank
Athlete	Event	G1	G2	G3	G4	G5	G6	Total	G1	G2	G3	G4	G5	G6	Total	Rank
Thailand A	Mixed Free Fire	4	21	36	19	38	6	116	22	16	17	10	12	11	88	4
Thailand B	Mixed Free Fire	23	9	22	10	13	9	96	30	30	18	32	7	6	123	1st place, gold medalist(s)

== Fencing ==
Athlete	Event	Round of 16	Quarterfinals	Semifinals	Final	
Athlete	Event	Opposition Result	Opposition Result	Opposition Result	Opposition Result	Rank
Chinnaphat Chaloemchanen	Men's Individual Épée	Bye	Bautista (PHI); W 15–14	Jose Jr. (PHI); L 3–15	Did not advance	3rd place, bronze medalist(s)
Nattiphong Singkham	Men's Individual Épée	Sundara (INA); L 9–15	Did not advance			
Ratchanavi Deejing	Men's Individual Foil	—N/a	Notethakod (THA); L 7–15	Did not advance		
Notethakod Wangpasit	Men's Individual Foil	—N/a	Ratchanavi (THA); W 15–7	Perez (PHI); W 15–6	Tan (SGP); L 11–15	2nd place, silver medalist(s)
Pakarn Pongdee	Men's Individual Sabre	Chan (SGP); L 7–15	Did not advance			
Voragun Srinualnad	Men's Individual Sabre	Bye	Nguyễn (VIE); L 12–15	Did not advance		
Thailand's men	Men's Team Épée	—N/a	Indonesia; W 45–37	Vietnam; L 29–45	Did not advance	3rd place, bronze medalist(s)
Thailand's men	Men's Team Foil	—N/a	Bye	Malaysia; L 44–45	Did not advance	3rd place, bronze medalist(s)
Thailand's men	Men's Team Sabre	—N/a	Singapore; W 45–41	Vietnam; L 35–45	Did not advance	3rd place, bronze medalist(s)
Natpapat Sangngio	Women's Individual Épée	—N/a	Goh (MAS); W 15–9	Tikanah (SGP); L 12–15	Did not advance	3rd place, bronze medalist(s)
Warisa Winya	Women's Individual Épée	—N/a	Koh (SGP); L 6–15	Did not advance		
Chayanutphat Shinnakerdchoke	Women's Individual Foil	Fong (MAS); W 15–4	Catantan (PHI); L 4–15	Did not advance		
Chayada Smithisukul	Women's Individual Foil	Bye	Berthier (SGP); L 4–15	Did not advance		
Tonkhaw Phokaew	Women's Individual Sabre	—N/a	Nicanor (PHI); W 15–12	Phạm (VIE); W 15–13	Heng (SGP); L 14–15	2nd place, silver medalist(s)
Poonyanuch Pithakduangkamol	Women's Individual Sabre	—N/a	Phạm (VIE); L 14–15	Did not advance		
Thailand's women	Women's Team Épée	—N/a	Bye	Vietnam; W 45–33	Singapore; L 36–45	2nd place, silver medalist(s)
Thailand's women	Women's Team Foil	—N/a	Bye	Philippines; L 41–40	Did not advance	3rd place, bronze medalist(s)
Thailand's women	Women's Team Sabre	—N/a	Bye	Philippines; W 45–35	Singapore; W 45–32	1st place, gold medalist(s)

== Field hockey ==
Team	Event	Preliminary round					Semifinal	Final	
Team	Event	Opposition Score	Opposition Score	Opposition Score	Opposition Score	Rank	Opposition Score	Opposition Score	Rank
Thailand men's	Men's Tournament	Indonesia; W 4–0	Singapore; W 1–0	Myanmar; W 8–0	Malaysia; W 6–2	1 Q	Indonesia; W 1–1; 4–3^{SO}	Malaysia; L 0–8	2nd place, silver medalist(s)
Thailand women's	Women's Tournament	Indonesia; W 3–2	Singapore; W 3–0	Malaysia; D 1–1	—N/a	2 Q	Indonesia; L 0–0; 0–2^{SO}	Did not advance	3rd place, bronze medalist(s)

Key:

- SO – Match decided by Shoot-Out.

== Figure skating ==
Athlete	Event	Preliminary		Final	
Athlete	Event	Score	Rank	Score	Rank
Aaron Kulvatunyou	Men's Single	52.02	2 Q	137.98	2nd place, silver medalist(s)
Tharon Warasittichai	Men's Single	45.09	5 Q	119.96	5
Phattaratida Kaneshige	Women's Single	50.18	1 Q	150.74	1st place, gold medalist(s)
Pimmpida Lerdpraiwan	Women's Single	42.30	4 Q	122.11	3rd place, bronze medalist(s)

== Floorball ==
Team	Event	Group Stage					Final / BM	
Team	Event	Opposition Score	Opposition Score	Opposition Score	Opposition Score	Rank	Opposition Score	Rank
Thailand men's	Men's tournament	Laos; W 45–0	Singapore; W 9–5	Malaysia; W 15–3	Philippines; W 7–2	1 Q	Philippines; W 6–2	1st place, gold medalist(s)
Thailand women's	Women's tournament	Malaysia; W 6–0	Singapore; D 2–2	Philippines; W 10–1	—N/a	2 Q	Singapore; W 2–1	1st place, gold medalist(s)

== Football ==
Summary

Team	Event	Group Stage			Semifinal	Final / BM	
Team	Event	Opposition Score	Opposition Score	Rank	Opposition Score	Opposition Score	Rank
Thailand men's	Men's Tournament	Timor-Leste; W 6–1	Singapore; W 3–0	1 Q	Malaysia; W 1–0	Vietnam; L 2–3	2nd place, silver medalist(s)
Thailand women's	Women's Tournament	Indonesia; W 8–0	Singapore; W 2–0	1 Q	Philippines; L 1–1 (a.e.t.); 2–4^{P}	Indonesia; W 2–0	3rd place, bronze medalist(s)

Key:

- A.E.T – After extra time.
- P – Match decided by penalty-shootout.

== Futsal ==
Team	Event	Group Stage					Semifinal	Final / BM	
Team	Event	Opposition Score	Opposition Score	Opposition Score	Opposition Score	Rank	Opposition Score	Opposition Score	Rank
Thailand men's	Men's Tournament	Malaysia; W 7–1	Myanmar; W 3–0	Vietnam; W 2–1	Indonesia; L 1–6	—N/a	—N/a		2nd place, silver medalist(s)
Thailand women's	Women's Tournament	Philippines; W 7–1	Malaysia; W 6–0	—N/a		1 Q	Indonesia; L 4–4 (6–7^{P})	Philippines; W 5–0	3rd place, bronze medalist(s)

== Golf ==
Athlete	Event	Round 1	Round 2	Round 3	Round 4	Total	
Athlete	Event	Score	Score	Score	Score	Score	Rank
Warut Boonrod	Men's Individual	76	76	76	75	303	24
Pongsapak Laopakdee	Men's Individual	65	66	66	70	267	1st place, gold medalist(s)
Thanawin Lee	Men's Individual	76	69	71	68	284	5
Parin Sarasmut	Men's Individual	73	64	71	72	280	3rd place, bronze medalist(s)
Warut Boonrod; Pongsapak Laopakdee; Thanawin Lee; Parin Sarasmut	Men's Team	214	199	208	210	831	1st place, gold medalist(s)
Kritchanya Kaopattanaskul	Women's Individual	70	70	71	74	285	2nd place, silver medalist(s)
Prim Prachnakorn	Women's Individual	72	71	70	66	279	1st place, gold medalist(s)
Pimpisa Rubrong	Women's Individual	76	73	71	68	288	4
Kritchanya Kaopattanaskul; Prim Prachnakorn; Pimpisa Rubrong	Women's Team	142	141	142	134	558	1st place, gold medalist(s)

== Gymnastics ==
Athlete	Event	Preliminary		Final	
Athlete	Event	Score	Rank	Score	Rank
Tikumporn Surintornta	Men's Floor	13.567	1 Q	14.000	1st place, gold medalist(s)
Tikumporn Surintornta	Men's Vault	12.417	6 Q	13.717	3rd place, bronze medalist(s)
Fuga Nomura	Men's Pommel Horse	11.367	4 Q	11.100	4
Fuga Nomura	Men's Rings	12.600	2	Did not advance	
Fuga Nomura	Men's Parallel Bars	12.567	2 Q	12.167	3rd place, bronze medalist(s)
Suphacheep Baobenmad	Men's Rings	12.367	4 Q	12.400	4
Suphacheep Baobenmad	Men's Parallel Bars	12.533	3	Did not advance	
Weerapat Chuaisom	Men's Horizontal Bar	12.567	2 Q	13.400	1st place, gold medalist(s)
Sasiwimon Mueangphuan	Women's Floor	13.600	1 Q	13.367	1st place, gold medalist(s)
Sasiwimon Mueangphuan	Women's Vault	11.975	8	Did not advance	
Sasiwimon Mueangphuan	Women's Balance Beam	11.500	6 Q	11.567	6
Piyatida Nonluecha	Women's Floor	10.500	10	Did not advance	
Piyatida Nonluecha	Women's Balance Beam	10.200	8	Did not advance	
Piyatida Nonluecha	Women's Uneven Bars	7.550	8	Did not advance	
Thantida Sophia Ruecker	Women's Vault	12.125	6 Q	12.516	5
Thantida Sophia Ruecker	Women's Uneven Bars	11.750	3 Q	10.700	5
Piyada Peeramatukorn	Women's Individual All Around	19.36	—	96.890	3rd place, bronze medalist(s)
Sikharee Sutthiragsa	Women's Individual All Around	21.73	—	Did not advance	
Thailand	Women's 1 Type of Apparatus (5)	19.400	2 Q	21.230	1st place, gold medalist(s)
Thailand	Women's 2 Types of Apparatus (3+2)	22.830	1 Q	22.900	1st place, gold medalist(s)
Thailand	Women's Team	—N/a		222.36	2nd place, silver medalist(s)
Chawisa Intakul; Chanokpon Jiumsukjai	Mixed Aerobic Pair	17.634	1 Q	18.367	1st place, gold medalist(s)
Thailand	Mixed Aerobic Group	17.966	1 Q	18.033	2nd place, silver medalist(s)

== Handball ==
Team	Event	Preliminary round						Semifinal	Final / BM	
Team	Event	Opposition Score	Opposition Score	Opposition Score	Opposition Score	Opposition Score	Rank	Opposition Score	Opposition Score	Rank
Thailand	Men's Tournament	Malaysia; W 39–20	Indonesia; W 34–22	Vietnam; W 30–25	Singapore; W 33–20	Philippines; W 37–18	1 Q	Indonesia; W 35–32	Vietnam; W 39–35	1st place, gold medalist(s)
Thailand	Women's Tournament	Singapore; W 31–17	Philippines; W 32–10	Vietnam; L 23–30	—N/a		2 Q	Singapore; W 29–23	Vietnam; L 16–24	2nd place, silver medalist(s)

== Hockey5s ==
Team	Event	Preliminary round				Semifinal	Final	
Team	Event	Opposition Score	Opposition Score	Opposition Score	Rank	Opposition Score	Opposition Score	Rank
Thailand	Men's Tournament	Philippines; W 11–0	Indonesia; W 4–1	Malaysia; L 1–9	2 Q	Indonesia; L 3–8	Did not advance	3rd place, bronze medalist(s)
Thailand	Women's Tournament	Philippines; W 9–0	Indonesia; W 6–2	Malaysia; L 2–7	2 Q	Indonesia; W 7–2	Malaysia; W 7–1	1st place, gold medalist(s)

== Ice hockey ==
Team	Event	Preliminary round					Semifinal	Final	
Team	Event	Opposition Score	Opposition Score	Opposition Score	Opposition Score	Rank	Opposition Score	Opposition Score	Rank
Thailand men's	Men's Tournament	Malaysia; W 14–0	Indonesia; L 2–3	Singapore; W 7–3	Philippines; W 8–0	2 Q	Philippines; W 8–1	Indonesia; L 2–3	2nd place, silver medalist(s)
Thailand women's	Women's Tournament	Philippines; W 13–0	Malaysia; W 18–0	Singapore; W 8–0	—N/a	1 Q	Malaysia; W 19–0	Philippines; W 13–4	1st place, gold medalist(s)

== Indoor hockey ==
Team	Event	Preliminary round					Semifinal	Final	
Team	Event	Opposition Score	Opposition Score	Opposition Score	Opposition Score	Rank	Opposition Score	Opposition Score	Rank
Thailand men's	Men's Tournament	Philippines; W 11–0	Singapore; W 5–2	Indonesia; L 2–6	Malaysia; L 4–6	3 Q	Indonesia; L 3–6	Did not advance	3rd place, bronze medalist(s)
Thailand women's	Women's Tournament	Philippines; W 7–0	Indonesia; D 2–2	Singapore; W 10–0	Malaysia; W 2–0	1 Q	Singapore; W 6–0	Malaysia; W 4–3	1st place, gold medalist(s)

== Jet Skiing ==
Athlete	Event	Final					
Athlete	Event	Round 1	Round 2	Round 3	Round 4	Total	Rank
Tapatarawat Joesonnusont	Mixed Endurance Open	400	380	350	—N/a	1130	2nd place, silver medalist(s)
Sorrawit Phasuk	Mixed Endurance Open	352	352	380	—N/a	1084	5
Sasina Phiwngam	Mixed Runabout 1100 Stock	60	60	60	53	233	1st place, gold medalist(s)
Piarrat Srikongruk	Mixed Runabout 1100 Stock	48	53	27	DSQ	—	—
Supak Settura	Mixed Runabout Limited	60	53	60	53	226	1st place, gold medalist(s)
Kasidit Teeraprateep	Mixed Runabout Limited	36	60	48	60	204	2nd place, silver medalist(s)
Teera Settura	Mixed Runabout Stock	53	48	43	60	204	2nd place, silver medalist(s)
Permphon Teerapatpanich	Mixed Runabout Stock	60	60	60	53	233	1st place, gold medalist(s)
Tanawid Molee	Mixed Ski 1500 Stock	60	60	60	53	233	1st place, gold medalist(s)
Nantawat Singurai	Mixed Ski 1500 Stock	48	48	43	60	199	3rd place, bronze medalist(s)
Arnon Hongklang	Mixed Ski GP	53	35	53	60	219	2nd place, silver medalist(s)
Tanawin Molee	Mixed Ski GP	60	60	60	53	233	1st place, gold medalist(s)

== Ju-jitsu ==
Duo Classic

Athlete	Event	Preliminary round		Final	Rank
Athlete	Event	Total	Rank	Total	Rank
Charatchai Kitpongsri; Warut Netpong	Men's Duo Show	51.0	1 Q	53.0	1st place, gold medalist(s)
Nawin Kokaew; Teeradet Polsuwan	Men's Duo Show	48.5	2 Q	50.5	2nd place, silver medalist(s)
Nawin Kokaew; Teeradet Polsuwan	Men's Duo Classic	—N/a		–	1st place, gold medalist(s)
Charatchai Kitpongsri; Warut Netpong	Men's Duo Classic	—N/a		–	2nd place, silver medalist(s)
Suphawadee Kaeosrasaen; Kunsatri Kumsroi	Women's Duo Show	50.5	1 Q	51.0	1st place, gold medalist(s)
Kanyarat Phaophan; Panyaporn Phaophan	Women's Duo Show	48.5	2 Q	48.5	2nd place, silver medalist(s)
Kanyarat Phaophan; Panyaporn Phaophan	Women's Duo Classic	—N/a		–	1st place, gold medalist(s)
Suphawadee Kaeosrasaen; Kunsatri Kumsroi	Women's Duo Classic	—N/a		–	2nd place, silver medalist(s)
Kunsatri Kumsroi; Ratcharat Yimprai	Mixed Duo show	50.5	2 Q	54.0	1st place, gold medalist(s)
Warawut Saengsriruang; Lalita Yunnan	Mixed Duo show	51.0	1 Q	52.0	2nd place, silver medalist(s)
Warawut Saengsriruang; Lalita Yunnan	Mixed Duo Classic	127	2 Q	–	1st place, gold medalist(s)
Piamsuk Satupap; Punnaphat Songsing	Mixed Duo Classic	125	3 Q	–	3rd place, bronze medalist(s)

Athlete	Event	Semifinals	Final	
Athlete	Event	Opposition Result	Opposition Result	Rank
Thailand	Mixed Team Duo Classic	Singapore; W 34–11	Vietnam; W 37–6	1st place, gold medalist(s)

Fighting

Athlete	Event	Preliminary		Round of 16	Quarterfinals	Semifinals	Repechage 1	Repechage 2	Final / BM	
Athlete	Event	Opposition Result	Opposition Result	Opposition Result	Opposition Result	Opposition Result	Opposition Result	Opposition Result	Opposition Result	Rank
Suwijak Kuntong	Men's Fighting - 62kg	—N/a			Vilayphone (LAO); W 50–0	Le (VIE); W 50–0	—N/a		Naphat (THA); W 50–0	1st place, gold medalist(s)
Naphat Mathupan	Men's Fighting - 62kg	—N/a			Đào (VIE); W 16–7	Del Rosario (PHI); W 50–0	—N/a		Suwijak (THA); L 0–50	2nd place, silver medalist(s)
Chanwit Aunjai	Men's Fighting - 77kg	—N/a		Palabay (PHI); W 50–0	Fuad (SGP); W 50–0	Đặng (VIE); W 24–6	—N/a		Jedd (SGP); L 9–16	2nd place, silver medalist(s)
Kampanart Polput	Men's Fighting - 77kg	—N/a		Bye	Jedd (SGP); L 4–10	Did not advance	Claravall (PHI); W 0–0	—N/a	Đặng (VIE); L 0–0	4
Nuchanat Singchalad	Women's Fighting - 52kg	—N/a		Nepomuceno (PHI); W 50–0	Triệu (VIE); W 18–1	Manixay (LAO); W 50–0	—N/a		Phụng (VIE); W 12–7	1st place, gold medalist(s)
Nutchaya Sugun	Women's Fighting - 52kg	—N/a		Bye	Henandhita (INA); L 8–10	Did not advance	Nepomuceno (PHI); W 0–0	Buzon (PHI); W 0–0	Manixay (LAO); W 0–0	3rd place, bronze medalist(s)
Suchanard Leakkhew	Women's Fighting - 63kg	Hà (VIE); W 9–5	Kerr (PHI); W 50–0	—N/a		Vũ (VIE); W 13–12	—N/a		Orapa (THA); L 0–0	2nd place, silver medalist(s)
Orapa Senatham	Women's Fighting - 63kg	Vũ (VIE); W 50–0	Ervika (SGP); W 50–0	—N/a		Hà (VIE); W 50–0	—N/a		Suchanard (THA); W 0–0	1st place, gold medalist(s)

Ne-waza

Athlete	Event	Round of 16	Quarterfinals	Semifinals	Final	
Athlete	Event	Opposition Result	Opposition Result	Opposition Result	Opposition Result	Rank
Suwijak Kuntong	Men's Ne-waza - 62kg	Mangubat (PHI); W 5–0	Thew (MAS); W 50–0	Cấn (VIE); W 4–2	Naphat (THA); W 50–0	1st place, gold medalist(s)
Naphat Mathupan	Men's Ne-waza - 62kg	Bye	Tan (SGP); W 0–0	Luzuriaga (PHI); W 2–0	Suwijak (THA); L 0–50	2nd place, silver medalist(s)
Kunnapong Hasdee	Men's Ne-waza - 69kg	Min (MYA); W 50–0	Lim (PHI); W 50–0	Đặng (VIE); L 0–0	Did not advance	3rd place, bronze medalist(s)
Sarin Soonthorn	Men's Ne-waza - 69kg	Bye	Phạm (VIE); W 4–2	Baluyo (PHI); L 0–2	Did not advance	3rd place, bronze medalist(s)
Chanwit Aunjai	Men's Ne-waza - 77kg	Bye	Nguyễn (VIE); W 10–0	Chua (SGP); W 2–0	Lim (SGP); W 4–0	1st place, gold medalist(s)
Kampanart Polput	Men's Ne-waza - 77kg	Bye	Lim (SGP); L 4–6	Did not advance		
Thanaphat Polput	Men's Ne-waza - 85kg	Sugiri (SGP); L 2–11	Did not advance			
Sooknatee Suntra	Men's Ne-waza - 85kg	Bye	Aacus (SGP); L 0–3	Did not advance		
Nutchaya Sugun	Women's Ne-waza - 48kg	Bye	May (MYA); W 8–0	Hong (SGP); W 50–0	Custodio (PHI); L 0–3	2nd place, silver medalist(s)
Kacie Pechrada Tan	Women's Ne-waza - 48kg	Bye	Lin (SGP); W 2–0	Custodio (PHI); L 0–0	Did not advance	3rd place, bronze medalist(s)
Nuchanat Singchalad	Women's Ne-waza - 57kg	Bye	Napolis (PHI); W 0–0	Poyong (MAS); W 50–0	Wong (MAS); W 10–0	1st place, gold medalist(s)
Aksarapak Sirimak	Women's Ne-waza - 57kg	Bye	Ramirez (PHI); L 0–50	Did not advance		
Maria Elissavet Kokkoliou	Women's Ne-waza - 63kg	Bye	Hazirah (SGP); W 2–0	Vũ (VIE); W 2–2	Orapa (THA); L 0–50	2nd place, silver medalist(s)
Orapa Senatham	Women's Ne-waza - 63kg	Bye	Ngô (VIE); W 0–0	Lao (PHI); W 0–0	Kokkoliou (THA); W 50–0	1st place, gold medalist(s)

== Judo ==
Kata

Athlete	Event	Preliminary round		Final	Rank
Athlete	Event	Total	Rank	Total	Rank
Sangob Sasipongpan; Pongthep Tumrongluk	Men's Nage-no-kata	387.0	2 Q	390.0	2nd place, silver medalist(s)
Suphattra Jaikhumkao; Pitima Thaweerattanasinp	Women's Ju-no-kata	401.0	1 Q	400.5	1st place, gold medalist(s)

Combat

Athlete	Event	Preliminary		Quarterfinals	Semifinals	Repechage	Final	
Athlete	Event	Opposition Score	Opposition Score	Opposition Score	Opposition Score	Opposition Score	Opposition Score	Rank
Jetsadakorn Suksai	Men's –55 kg	—N/a		Nguyễn (VIE); L	Did not advance	Htike (MYA); L	Did not advance	
Masayuki Terada	Men's 66–73 kg	—N/a		Bye	Warma (INA); W	—N/a	Quitain (PHI); W	1st place, gold medalist(s)
Photchara Kanchu	Men's 73–81 kg	—N/a		Teo (SGP); W	Ferrer (PHI); L	Lê (VIE); L	Did not advance	
Wei Puyang	Men's 81–90 kg	—N/a		Lê (VIE); W	Goh (SGP); W	—N/a	Dharma (INA); L	2nd place, silver medalist(s)
Kittipong Hantratin	Men's 90–100 kg	—N/a		Phạm (VIE); W	Tancontian (PHI); L	Ong (MAS); W	—N/a	3rd place, bronze medalist(s)
Kamolwan Akkajan	Women's 52–57 kg	—N/a		Valerie (SGP); W	Rafael (PHI); L	Sengdakee (LAO); W	—N/a	3rd place, bronze medalist(s)
Supattra Nanong	Women's 63–70 kg	—N/a		Phyo (MYA); W	Lê (VIE); L	Alabama (LAO); W	—N/a	3rd place, bronze medalist(s)
Ikumi Oeda	Women's 70–78 kg	Lương (VIE); W	Fajardo (PHI); L	—N/a			Aye (MYA); W	1st place, gold medalist(s)
Thonthan Satjadet	Women's +78 kg	—N/a		Bye	Izzatul (MAS); W	—N/a	Permatasari (INA); W	1st place, gold medalist(s)
Thailand	Mixed Team	—N/a		Singapore; W	Vietnam; W	—N/a	Philippines; L	2nd place, silver medalist(s)

== Kabaddi ==
Team	Event	Preliminary round						Final	
Team	Event	Opposition Score	Opposition Score	Opposition Score	Opposition Score	Opposition Score	Rank	Opposition Score	Rank
Thailand	Men's Standard Style	Myanmar; W 69–10	Indonesia; W 49–20	Malaysia; W 49–17	Timor-Leste; W 66–16	Singapore; W 63–11	1 Q	Indonesia; W 31–23	1st place, gold medalist(s)
Thailand	Men's Super Five	Malaysia; W 40–25	Timor-Leste; W 24–14	Singapore; W 34–13	Indonesia; W 30–15	Myanmar; W 34–16	1 Q	Indonesia; W 31–24	1st place, gold medalist(s)
Thailand	Men's Three Stars	Malaysia; D 23–23	Timor-Leste; W 40–10	Singapore; W 25–8	Myanmar; W 33–26	Indonesia; W 31–21	1 Q	Malaysia; L 16–28	2nd place, silver medalist(s)
Thailand	Women's Standard Style	Singapore; W 68–14	Timor-Leste; W WO	Indonesia; W 45–27	Malaysia; W 62–35	—N/a	1 Q	Indonesia; W 34–31	1st place, gold medalist(s)
Thailand	Women's Super Five	Singapore; W 39–7	Timor-Leste; W WO	Malaysia; W 45–14	Indonesia; W 29–11	—N/a			1st place, gold medalist(s)
Thailand	Women's Three Stars	Singapore; W 34–4	Indonesia; L 17–25	Malaysia; W 20–19	Timor-Leste; W WO	—N/a	3	Did not advance	3rd place, bronze medalist(s)

== Kickboxing ==
Athlete	Event	Quarterfinals	Semifinals	Final	
Athlete	Event	Opposition Score	Opposition Score	Opposition Score	Rank
Chainarong Yawanophat	Men's Ring: Full Contact 57kg	Bye	Enggar (INA); W 3–0	Nguyễn (VIE); L 0–2	2nd place, silver medalist(s)
Jakkrit Kongtook	Men's Ring: K–1 60kg	Tun (MYA); W 3–0	Hoàng (VIE); W 3–0	Hamonangan (INA); L 2–1	2nd place, silver medalist(s)
Netipong Phrommakhot	Men's Ring: Low Kick 51kg	Bye	Pareja (PHI); W 2–0	Nguyễn (VIE); W 3–0	1st place, gold medalist(s)
Alexandre Mangkorn Berrie	Men's Tatami: Kick Light 57kg	Bye	Dương (VIE); W 3–0	Bayawon (PHI); W 3–0	1st place, gold medalist(s)
Pikanet Sukyik	Men's Tatami: Point Fighting 63kg	Nguyễn (VIE); W 10–0	Koh (SGP); W 14–4	Sitepu (INA); W 14–7	1st place, gold medalist(s)
Hanphan Rattanaphon	Women's Ring: K–1 52kg	Triệu (VIE); W 3–0	Dacquel (PHI); W 3–0	May (MYA); W 2–1	1st place, gold medalist(s)
Jantakarn Manoban	Women's Ring: Low Kick 48kg	Bye	Nurul (INA); W 3–0	Bon-as (PHI); L 1–2	2nd place, silver medalist(s)
Sasisom Kaewesri	Women's Tatami: Point Fighting 50kg	Bye	Lin (MYA); L 4–8	Did not advance	3rd place, bronze medalist(s)

== Kiteboarding ==
Athlete	Event	R1	R2	R3	R4	R5	R6	R7	R8	R9	R10	R11	R12	R13	R14	R15	R16	Total	Nett	Rank
Joseph Jonathan Weston	Men's Formula Kite	(2.0)	(2.0)	(2.0)	2.0	2.0	2.0	2.0	2.0	2.0	2.0	2.0	2.0	2.0	2.0	2.0	2.0	32.0	26.0	2nd place, silver medalist(s)

== Netball ==
Team	Event	Group Stage					Final	
Team	Event	Opposition Score	Opposition Score	Opposition Score	Opposition Score	Rank	Opposition Score	Rank
Thailand women's	Women's Tournament	Brunei; W 73–37	Philippines; W 64–34	Singapore; L 47–69	Malaysia; L 52–65	3	Did not advance	3rd place, bronze medalist(s)

== Pétanque ==
Athlete	Event	Preliminary Round					Semifinals	Final	
Athlete	Event	Opposition Result	Opposition Result	Opposition Result	Opposition Result	Rank	Opposition Result	Opposition Result	Rank
Akkrachai Meekhong	Men's Single	Repal (PHI); W 13–4	Southammavong (LAO); W 13–11	—N/a		1 Q	Southammavong (LAO); L 7–13	Did not advance	3rd place, bronze medalist(s)
Ratchata Khamdee; Thanawan Toosewha	Men's Doubles	Helmi / Safwan (MAS); W 10–7	Camingal / Micutuan (PHI); W 13–3	Lý / Ngô (VIE); W 13–8	Oulamanivong / Viphakon (LAO); W 13–3	1 Q	Oulamanivong / Viphakon (LAO); W 13–2	Lý / Ngô (VIE); L 8–13	2nd place, silver medalist(s)
Phongsakron Ainpu; Chareonwit Ketsattaban; Anuphon Phathan; Phanukorn Roeksanit	Men's Triples	Douangmisy / Mienmany / Phetvaly / Vongdala (LAO); W 13–4	Harliza / Hidayat / Krisbiantoro (INA); L 7–12	—N/a		2 Q	Fakhri / Muqri / Zamrulhisham (MAS); W 13–11	Harliza / Hidayat / Krisbiantoro (INA); W 13–7	1st place, gold medalist(s)
Sirirat Khaithep	Women's Single	Munar (PHI); W 13–8	Thepphakan (LAO); L 0–13	—N/a		2 Q	Aprilia (INA); W 13–6	Thepphakan (LAO); L 11–13	2nd place, silver medalist(s)
Sunitra Phuangyoo; Phantipha Wongchuvej	Women's Doubles	Domenios / Soberre (PHI); W 8–5	Nguyễn / Nguyễn (VIE); L 2–13	Sengchanphet / Sisavath (LAO); W 11–6	Alya / Noor (MAS); W 13–2	2 Q	Sengchanphet / Sisavath (LAO); W 13–0	Nguyễn / Nguyễn (VIE); L 6–13	2nd place, silver medalist(s)
Kantaros Choochuay; Cheerawan Kallaya; Thongsri Thamakord; Arisa Wadrongphak	Women's Triples	Douangmanichanh / Phunthaly / Sengmany / Vongsee (LAO); W 13–5	Kim / Thạch / Trịnh / Vũ (VIE); W 9–5	Alarcon / Isdam / Leonardo (PHI); W 11–8	Johnson / Sahira / Vennice (MAS); W 13–2	1 Q	Johnson / Sahira / Vennice (MAS); W 13–6	Kim / Thạch / Trịnh / Vũ (VIE); W 13–7	1st place, gold medalist(s)
Lalita Chiaochan	Women's Shooting	—N/a					Nguyễn (VIE); W 39–21	Khin Cherry Thet (MYA); W 43–37	1st place, gold medalist(s)
Nantawan Fueangsanit; Sarawut Sriboonpeng	Mixed Doubles	Muenxay / Ounnalom (LAO); W 13–7	Baria / Fuentes (PHI); W 13–0	Ali / Hakimi (MAS); W 12–7	—N/a	1 Q	Muenxay / Ounnalom (LAO); W 13–5	Baria / Fuentes (PHI); W 13–3	1st place, gold medalist(s)
Pranatsama Buacharoen; Pataratida Meepak; Wanchaloem Srimueang	Mixed Triples	Shein / Tun / Wai (MYA); W 13–8	Aziz / Ismail / Zaini (MAS); W 13–7	—N/a		1 Q	Lê / Lê / Phạm (VIE); W 13–11	Manythone / Neuthsavath / Souliya (LAO); L 2–13	2nd place, silver medalist(s)
Piyabut Chamchoi; Supanan Fueangsanit; Nadtaporn Ganjiang	Mixed Triples	Asifa / Heriyanto / Suwajianto (INA); W 13–1	Bacus / J. Bon / M. Bon (PHI); W 13–0	Lathsavong / Vongsavath / Xamounty (LAO); L 8–10	—N/a	2 Q	Asifa / Heriyanto / Suwajianto (INA); W 13–1	Lathsavong / Vongsavath / Xamounty (LAO); W 13–10	1st place, gold medalist(s)

== Polo ==
Team	Event	Preliminary round				Semifinals	Final/BM	
Team	Event	Opposition Score	Opposition Score	Opposition Score	Rank	Opposition Score	Opposition Score	Rank
Thailand	2–4 goals	Brunei; W 7½–7	Philippines; W 4–2½	—N/a	2 Q	Philippines; W 11–1½	Brunei; W 7½–0	1st place, gold medalist(s)
Thailand	4–6 goals	Brunei; W 8–2	Malaysia; W 9½–7	Indonesia; W 8–7	1 Q	—N/a	Malaysia; L 6½–10	2nd place, silver medalist(s)

== Rowing ==
Athlete	Event	Preliminary		Final	
Athlete	Event	Time	Rank	Time	Rank
Premanut Wattananusith	Men's Singles sculls	08:31.046	3 Q	08:15.827	2nd place, silver medalist(s)
Narongsak Naksaeng; Premanut Wattananusith	Men's Doubles sculls	07:19.285	3 Q	07:21.404	2nd place, silver medalist(s)
Nawamin Dechudomrat; Siwakorn Wongpin	Men's Lightweight Pair	07:50.057	3 Q	08:08.138	3rd place, bronze medalist(s)
Phasin Chueatai; Nawamin Dechudomrat; Yutthana Tamarom; Siwakorn Wongpin	Men's Lightweight Quadruple Sculls	07:22.856	3 Q	06:48.319	3rd place, bronze medalist(s)
Siripong Chaiwichitchonkul	Men's Coastal Solo	02:40.83	2 Q	02:46.65	1st place, gold medalist(s)
Parisa Chaempudsa; Rawiwan Sukkaew	Women's Doubles sculls	08:19.428	2 Q	08:21.634	2nd place, silver medalist(s)
Parisa Chaempudsa; Jirakit Phuetthonglang; Matinee Raruen; Rawiwan Sukkaew	Women's Quadruple Sculls	07:30.988	2 Q	07:46.340	2nd place, silver medalist(s)
Arisa Chaiya; Natticha Kaewhom; Jirakit Phuetthonglang; Matinee Raruen	Women's Four	08:03.515	2 Q	07:47.647	3rd place, bronze medalist(s)
Arisa Chaiya	Women's Lightweight Singles Sculls	10:21.908	6 Q	10:13.156	6
Parisa Chaempudsa	Women's Coastal Solo	02:45.30	1 Q	02:55.61	1st place, gold medalist(s)

== Rugby sevens ==
Team	Event	Preliminary round					Final/BM	
Team	Event	Opposition Score	Opposition Score	Opposition Score	Opposition Score	Rank	Opposition Score	Rank
Thailand men's	Men's Tournament	Laos; W 39–0	Singapore; W 22–0	Malaysia; W 17–12	Philippines; W 12–10	1 Q	Singapore; W 10–5	1st place, gold medalist(s)
Thailand women's	Women's Tournament	Indonesia; W 34–0	Singapore; W 36–0	Philippines; W 36–0	Malaysia; W 41–0	1 Q	Malaysia; W 37–0	1st place, gold medalist(s)

== Sepak takraw ==
Chinlone

Athlete	Event	Preliminary Round				Final			
Athlete	Event	Set 1	Set 2	Total	Rank	Set 1	Set 2	Total	Rank
Athlete	Event	Score	Score	Total	Rank	Score	Score	Total	Rank
Apisit Chaichana; Kittichai Khamsaenrach; Tawatchai Kongpakdee; Noppadon Kongthawthong; Dusit Piyawong; Eekkawee Ruenphara; Khanawut Rungrot; Thongchai Sombatkerd	Men's linking	250	251	501	2 Q	246	255	501	2nd place, silver medalist(s)
Yaowares Chaichana; Yowvalux Jaisue; Pornpairin Paenthong; Jiraporn Palasri; Suwanna Petsamorn; Vimonthip Sawaingam; Suthida Thawantha; Suthida Upajanto	Women's linking	191	203	394	2 Q	223	223	446	2nd place, silver medalist(s)

Hoop

Athlete	Event	Preliminary Round		Final	
Athlete	Event	Total	Rank	Total	Rank
Nantipat Kirirattanachai; Komin Naonon; Supot Padungkan; Anuphat Phunirot; Jharuphong Piyasakphakkul; Sompol Rakchat	Men's hoop	900	1 Q	880	1st place, gold medalist(s)
Pimpika Moongsupeng; Arriya Namsomboon; Sujittra Nawasimma; Ketmanee Potjanit; Chawisa Raksachat; Warintorn Setraksa	Women's hoop	970	1 Q	1000	1st place, gold medalist(s)

Sepak takraw

Team	Event	Preliminary round					Semifinal	Final	
Team	Event	Opposition Score	Opposition Score	Opposition Score	Opposition Score	Rank	Opposition Score	Opposition Score	Rank
Thailand	Men's Regu	Singapore	Indonesia	—N/a					
Thailand	Men's Team Regu	Brunei; W 3–0	Indonesia; W 3–0	—N/a		1 Q	Myanmar; W 2–0	Malaysia; L 1–2	2nd place, silver medalist(s)
Thailand	Men's Quadrant	Myanmar; W 2–1	Philippines; W 2–0	Indonesia; W 2–0	Timor-Leste; W 2–0	1 Q	Vietnam; L 1–2	Did not advance	3rd place, bronze medalist(s)
Thailand	Women's Regu	Indonesia	Malaysia	Vietnam	—N/a				
Thailand	Women's Team Regu	Philippines; W 3–0	Vietnam; W 3–0	—N/a		1 Q	Myanmar; W 2–0	Vietnam; W 2–0	1st place, gold medalist(s)
Thailand	Women's Quadrant	Myanmar; W 2–1	Indonesia; W 2–0	Malaysia; W 2–0	—N/a	1 Q	Philippines; W 2–0	Vietnam; W 2–0	1st place, gold medalist(s)
Thailand	Mixed Quadrant	Indonesia; W 2–0	Philippines; W 2–0	—N/a		1 Q	Vietnam; W 2–0	Indonesia; W 2–0	1st place, gold medalist(s)

== Skateboarding ==
Athlete	Event	Preliminary			Final	
Athlete	Event	Round 1	Round 2	Round 3	Score	Rank
Konwit Ketkaeo	Men's Park	66.84	77.91	71.81	82.43	2nd place, silver medalist(s)
Brian Van Upapong	Men's Park	54.18	73.62	23.56	74.75	3rd place, bronze medalist(s)
Kirin Petkiree	Men's Street	69.09	46.72	72.60	153.22	2nd place, silver medalist(s)
Thawatchai Siangoueng	Men's Street	61.39	64.13	40.85	152.31	3rd place, bronze medalist(s)
Freya Sariya Brown	Women's Park	59.60	40.85	57.23	64.13	3rd place, bronze medalist(s)
Myra Chantara Brown	Women's Park	27.63	55.31	45.37	54.18	5
Vareeraya Sukasem	Women's Street	27.40	44.01	29.66	111.18	3rd place, bronze medalist(s)
Chunkao Udomphen	Women's Street	42.88	51.92	71.25	160.34	1st place, gold medalist(s)

== Snooker ==
Athlete	Event	Round of 16	Quarterfinals	Semifinals	Final	
Athlete	Event	Opposition Result	Opposition Result	Opposition Result	Opposition Result	Rank
Poramin Danjirakul	Men's 6-red Singles	Ong (SGP); W 5–2	Moh (MAS); W 5–0	Mengorio (PHI); W 5–0	Leong (MAS); L 2–5	2nd place, silver medalist(s)
Wattana Phu-Ob-Om	Men's 6-red Singles	Leong (MAS); L 2–5	Did not advance			
Kritsanut Lertsattayathorn	Men's Snooker Singles	Mengorio (PHI); W 4–1	Aung (MYA); W 4–1	Leong (MAS); W 4–2	Passakorn (THA); L 2–4	2nd place, silver medalist(s)
Passakorn Suwannawat	Men's Snooker Singles	Bye	Ong (SGP); W 4–0	Phone (MYA); W 4–2	Kritsanut (THA); W 4–2	1st place, gold medalist(s)
Jongrak Boonrod; Pongsakorn Chongjairak; Pachara Mayor	Men's 6-red Team	—N/a	Indonesia; L 3–4	Did not advance		
Nattanapong Chaikul; Kritsanut Lertsattayathorn; Passakorn Suwannawat	Men's Snooker Team	—N/a	Bye	Malaysia; W 3–2	Laos; W 3–1	1st place, gold medalist(s)
Siripaporn Nuanthakhamjan	Women's 6-red Singles	Annabella (INA); W 3–1	Sihalath (LAO); W 3–0	Song (MAS); W 3–1	Nutcharut (THA); W 3–2	1st place, gold medalist(s)
Nutcharut Wongharuthai	Women's 6-red Singles	Chai (SGP); W 3–0	Emilia (INA); W 3–0	Tan (MAS); W 3–0	Siripaporn (THA); L 2–3	2nd place, silver medalist(s)
Panchaya Channoi	Women's Snooker Singles	Emilia (INA); W 3–0	Chai (SGP); W 3–2	Sihalath (LAO); W 3–0	Nutcharut (THA); L 1–3	2nd place, silver medalist(s)
Nutcharut Wongharuthai	Women's Snooker Singles	Song (MAS); W 3–0	Chua (SGP); W 3–1	Annabella (INA); W 3–0	Panchaya (THA); W 3–1	1st place, gold medalist(s)
Ploychompoo Laokiatphong; Siripaporn Nuanthakhamjan; Narucha Phoemphul	Women's 6-red Team	—N/a	Laos; W 3–0	Malaysia; W 3–0	Indonesia; W 3–2	1st place, gold medalist(s)
Panchaya Channoi; Ploychompoo Laokiatphong; Nutcharut Wongharuthai	Women's Snooker Team	—N/a	Malaysia; W 3–0	Singapore; W 3–1	Indonesia; W 3–0	1st place, gold medalist(s)

== Sport climbing ==
Bouldering

Athlete	Event	Preliminary		Final	
Athlete	Event	Score	Rank	Score	Rank
Auswin Aueareechit	Men's Bouldering	109.9	1 Q	84.5	1st place, gold medalist(s)
Teeraphon Boondech	Men's Bouldering	109.1	3	Did not advance	
Ardch Intrachupongse	Men's Bouldering	109.7	2 Q	39.7	2nd place, silver medalist(s)
Napat Supavorased	Women's Bouldering	34.9	12	Did not advance	
Natcha Supavorased	Women's Bouldering	124.6	1 Q	69.8	1st place, gold medalist(s)
Puntarika Tunyavanich	Women's Bouldering	44.7	10	Did not advance	

Lead

Athlete	Event	Preliminary					Final	
Athlete	Event	R1 Score	R1 Rank	R2 Score	R2 Rank	Pts	Score	Rank
Auswin Aueareechit	Men's Lead	32+	3	36	4	2.24	38	2nd place, silver medalist(s)
Teeraphon Boondech	Men's Lead	32+	3	36	4	4.47	26	5
Napat Supavorased	Women's Lead	28	12	19+	13	12.75	Did not advance	
Natcha Supavorased	Women's Lead	33+	5	30	5	5.5	32	3rd place, bronze medalist(s)
Puntarika Tunyavanich	Women's Lead	33+	5	30	5	5.5	19+	6

Speed

Athlete	Event	Preliminary				Quarterfinals	Semifinals	Final/BM	
Athlete	Event	Lane A	Lane B	Time	Rank	Opposition Time	Opposition Time	Opposition Time	Rank
Sirapob Jirajaturapak	Men's Speed	5.84	6.16	5.84	5 Q	Aphiwit (THA); L 5.84–5.54	Did not advance		
Aphiwit Limpanichpakdee	Men's Speed	5.54	FALL	5.54	4 Q	Sirapob (THA); W 5.54–5.84	Robby (INA); L 4.96–4.82	Low (SGP); W 5.07–5.44	3rd place, bronze medalist(s)
Kanyanat Arsakit	Women's Speed	7.86	8.33	7.86	3 Q	Koh (SGP); W 7.86–9.70	Susan (INA); L 7.75–7.29	Rayya (INA); W 12.07–FALL	3rd place, bronze medalist(s)
Jiraporn Kaitwatcharachai	Women's Speed	10.21	11.11	10.21	8 Q	Lestari (INA); L 10.42–9.45	Did not advance		
Ratchamon Thongbai	Women's Speed	8.20	8.81	8.20	5 Q	Rayya (INA); L FALL–7.79	Did not advance		

== Swimming ==
Athlete	Event	Heat		Final	
Athlete	Event	Time	Rank	Time	Rank
Pongpanod Trithan	Men's 50 m Freestyle	23.11	5 Q	22.89	6
Pongpanod Trithan	Men's 100 m Freestyle	50.46	2 Q	50.38	5
Pongpanod Trithan	Men's 200 m Freestyle	1:52.27	9	Did not advance	
Tonnam Kanteemool	Men's 50 m Freestyle	23.03	5 Q	23.24	8
Tonnam Kanteemool	Men's 50 m Backstroke	25.88	3 Q	26.34	7
Tonnam Kanteemool	Men's 100 m Backstroke	57.37	4 Q	57.16	6
Tonnam Kanteemool	Men's 200 m Backstroke	2:09.74	6 Q	2:02.89	3rd place, bronze medalist(s)
Kittapart Kaewmart	Men's 100 m Freestyle	52.26	5	Did not advance	
Wongsakorn Patsamarn	Men's 200 m Freestyle	1:53.14	10	Did not advance	
Wongsakorn Patsamarn	Men's 200 m Butterfly	2:09.32	7 Q	2:02.87	4
Ratthawit Thammananthachote	Men's 1500 m Freestyle	15:45.76	5 Q	15:45.07	4
Ratthawit Thammananthachote	Men's 200 m Backstroke	2:09.15	4 Q	2:06.37	7
Khomchan Wichachai	Men's 400 m Freestyle	4:05.49	9	Did not advance	
Khomchan Wichachai	Men's 1500 m Freestyle	16:09.98	8 Q	16:02.02	7
Khomchan Wichachai	Men's 100 m Backstroke	59.66	11	Did not advance	
Geargchai Rutnosot	Men's 50 m Backstroke	26.62	4 Q	26.31	6
Geargchai Rutnosot	Men's 50 m Butterfly	24.93	7 Q	24.59	7
Thanonchai Janruksa	Men's 50 m Breaststroke	29.56	8 Q	28.97	8
Thanonchai Janruksa	Men's 100 m Breaststroke	1:02.18	3 Q	1:04.85	8
Rachasil Mahamongkol	Men's 50 m Breaststroke	29.67	9	Did not advance	
Rachasil Mahamongkol	Men's 100 m Breaststroke	1:02.20	4 Q	1:03.45	6
Navaphat Wongcharoen	Men's 50 m Butterfly	25.21	9	Did not advance	
Surasit Thongdeang	Men's 100 m Butterfly	54.27	3 Q	53.32	3rd place, bronze medalist(s)
Surasit Thongdeang	Men's 200 m Butterfly	2:04.47	1 Q	1:59.64	1st place, gold medalist(s)
Peerapat Settheechaichana	Men's 400 m Freestyle	4:09.87	10	Did not advance	
Peerapat Settheechaichana	Men's 200 m Individual Medley	2:10.63	9	Did not advance	
Peerapat Settheechaichana	Men's 400 m Individual Medley	4:32.12	6 Q	4:36.65	6
Ploy Leelayana	Women's 50 m Freestyle	26.58	8 Q	26.56	8
Kamonchanok Kwanmuang	Women's 200 m Freestyle	2:02.02	2 Q	2:02.76	4
Kamonchanok Kwanmuang	Women's 400 m Freestyle	4:25.31	2 Q	4:13.56	2nd place, silver medalist(s)
Kamonchanok Kwanmuang	Women's 800 m Freestyle	—N/a		8:52.17	3rd place, bronze medalist(s)
Kamonchanok Kwanmuang	Women's 200 m Butterfly	2:14.94	1 Q	2:11.78	1st place, gold medalist(s)
Kamonchanok Kwanmuang	Women's 200 m Individual Medley	2:15.77	1 Q	2:16.14	2nd place, silver medalist(s)
Kamonchanok Kwanmuang	Women's 400 m Individual Medley	4:55.37	1 Q	4:46.30	1st place, gold medalist(s)
Maria Nedelko	Women's 100 m Freestyle	57.84	6	Did not advance	
Maria Nedelko	Women's 200 m Freestyle	2:03.52	3 Q	2:02.71	3rd place, bronze medalist(s)
Maria Nedelko	Women's 400 m Freestyle	4:26.23	3 Q	4:22.74	5
Thitirat Charoensup	Women's 800 m Freestyle	—N/a		9:05.35	5
Saovanee Boonamphai	Women's 50 m Backstroke	29.17	2 Q	28.84	2nd place, silver medalist(s)
Saovanee Boonamphai	Women's 50 m Breaststroke	32.32	5 Q	31.71	3rd place, bronze medalist(s)
Mia Millar	Women's 50 m Backstroke	29.74	4 Q	29.93	8
Mia Millar	Women's 100 m Backstroke	1:04.26	5 Q	1:02.52	2nd place, silver medalist(s)
Mia Millar	Women's 200 m Backstroke	2:23.46	7 Q	2:13.95	1st place, gold medalist(s)
Kanistha Tungnapakorn	Women's 100 m Backstroke	1:06.77	10	Did not advance	
Kanistha Tungnapakorn	Women's 200 m Backstroke	2:22.92	5 Q	2:20.50	6
Jenjira Srisa-ard	Women's 50 m Breaststroke	32.00	3 Q	31.52	2nd place, silver medalist(s)
Jenjira Srisa-ard	Women's 50 m Butterfly	28.89	8 Q	26.96	3rd place, bronze medalist(s)
Thitirat Inchai	Women's 100 m Breaststroke	1:10.36	2 Q	1:10.58	5
Phiangkhwan Pawapotako	Women's 100 m Breaststroke	1:11.27	4 Q	1:10.42	4
Phiangkhwan Pawapotako	Women's 200 m Breaststroke	2:37.33	3 Q	2:33.48	4
Phiangkhwan Pawapotako	Women's 200 m Individual Medley	2:18.62	4	Did not advance	
Pimchanok Chinveeraphan	Women's 200 m Breaststroke	2:38.25	5 Q	2:31.50	2nd place, silver medalist(s)
Napatsawan Jaritkla	Women's 100 m Butterfly	1:01.76	2 Q	1:01.57	3rd place, bronze medalist(s)
Napatsawan Jaritkla	Women's 200 m Butterfly	2:22.60	8 Q	2:21.80	6
Jinjutha Pholjamjumrus	Women's 400 m Individual Medley	5:00.50	3 Q	4:47.62	3rd place, bronze medalist(s)
Kittapart Kaewmart; Tonnam Kanteemool; Surasit Thongdeang; Pongpanod Trithan	Men's 4x100 m Freestyle Relay	—N/a		3:22.18	5
Tonnam Kanteemool; Ratthawit Thammananthachote; Surasit Thongdeang; Pongpanod Trithan	Men's 4x200 m Freestyle Relay	—N/a		7:24.74	4
Thanonchai Janruksa; Tonnam Kanteemool; Surasit Thongdeang; Pongpanod Trithan	Men's 4x100 m Medley Relay	—N/a		3:40.28	2nd place, silver medalist(s)
Kamonchanok Kwanmuang; Ploy Leelayana; Maria Nedelko; Kamonluck Tungnapakorn	Women's 4x100 m Freestyle Relay	—N/a		3:49.17	4
Napatsawan Jaritkla; Kamonchanok Kwanmuang; Maria Nedelko; Jinjutha Pholjamjumrus	Women's 4x200 m Freestyle Relay	—N/a		8:10.10	1st place, gold medalist(s)
Thitirat Inchai; Napatsawan Jaritkla; Kamonchanok Kwanmuang; Mia Millar	Women's 4x100 m Medley Relay	—N/a		4:11.55	3rd place, bronze medalist(s)

== Taekwondo ==
Freestyle Poomsae

Athlete	Event	Final	
Athlete	Event	Score	Rank
Atchariya Koedkaew	Men's Freestyle Poomsae	8.100	2nd place, silver medalist(s)
Watcharakul Limjitakorn	Women's Freestyle Poomsae	7.900	1st place, gold medalist(s)
Sasipha Chuphon; Thitaree Kaewolanwasu; Navin Pinthasute; Nattachai Sutha; Sarisa Thaitonglang; Peerapat Trakarnwichit	Mixed Team Freestyle Poomsae	7.940	2nd place, silver medalist(s)

Recognized Poomsae

Athlete	Event	Quarterfinal	Semifinal	Final	
Athlete	Event	Opposition Score	Opposition Score	Opposition Score	Rank
Thana Kiewlailerd; Navin Pinthasute; Sippakorn Wetchakornpatiwong	Men's Team Recognized Poomsae	Bye	Philippines; L 8.540–8.610	Did not advance	3rd place, bronze medalist(s)
Chonlakorn Chayawatto; Chutikarn Lapnitayapan; Ratchadawan Tapaenthong	Women's Team Recognized Poomsae	Bye	Vietnam; W 8.580–8.430	Malaysia; L 8.450–8.560	2nd place, silver medalist(s)
Chonlakorn Chayawatto; Thana Kiewlailerd	Mixed Pair Recognized Poomsae	Malaysia; W 8.460–8.460	Vietnam; L 8.680–8.680	Did not advance	3rd place, bronze medalist(s)

Kyorugi

Athlete	Event	Quarterfinals	Semifinals	Final	
Athlete	Event	Opposition Score	Opposition Score	Opposition Score	Rank
Wisawakorn Jaichoo	Men's –54 kg	Barbosa (PHI); L 1–2	Did not advance		
Sirawit Mahamad	Men's +54 kg	Lein (TLS); W 2–0	Fu (MAS); W 2–1	Đinh (VIE); W 2–1	1st place, gold medalist(s)
Thanapoom Fuangnoi	Men's +58 kg	Shine (MYA); W 2–0	Raihan (INA); W 2–0	Buenavides (PHI); W 2–0	1st place, gold medalist(s)
Banlung Tubtimdang	Men's +63 kg	Bye	Hein (MYA); W 2–0	Nusair (PHI); W 2–0	1st place, gold medalist(s)
Krittayot Phrompatju	Men's +68 kg	Bye	Susilo (INA); L 0–2	Did not advance	3rd place, bronze medalist(s)
Thanathorn Saejo	Men's +74 kg	Bye	Phạm (VIE); W 2–0	Fadhilah (INA); W 2–0	1st place, gold medalist(s)
Chaichon Cho	Men's +80 kg	Bye	Khairudin (INA); W 2–0	Zuber (MAS); W 2–1	1st place, gold medalist(s)
Patcharakan Poolkerd	Women's –46 kg	Homsombat (LAO); W 2–0	Nguyễn (VIE); W 2–0	Sarza (PHI); W 2–0	1st place, gold medalist(s)
Kamonchanok Seeken	Women's +46 kg	Phyo (MYA); W 2–0	Trương (VIE); W 2–0	Mangin (PHI); L 0–2	2nd place, silver medalist(s)
Chutikan Jongkolrattanawattana	Women's +49 kg	Bye	Maheswari (INA); W 2–0	Nguyễn (VIE); W 2–0	1st place, gold medalist(s)
Phannapa Harnsujin	Women's +53 kg	Bye	Silvana (INA); W 2–0	Trần (VIE); L 1–2	2nd place, silver medalist(s)
Sasikarn Tongchan	Women's +57 kg	Bye	Kaung (MYA); W 2–0	Chan (PHI); W 2–0	1st place, gold medalist(s)
Chareewan Piyachutrutai	Women's +62 kg	—N/a		Kay (MYA); W 2–0	1st place, gold medalist(s)
Kannaluck Chuenchooklin	Women's +67 kg	Sotthachit (LAO); W 2–0	Bạc (VIE); L 0–2	Did not advance	3rd place, bronze medalist(s)

== Tennis ==
Athlete	Event	Round of 16	Quarterfinals	Semifinals	Final	
Athlete	Event	Opposition Result	Opposition Result	Opposition Result	Opposition Result	Rank
Maximus Jones	Men's Singles	Bye	Tang (SGP); W (7–5, 4–6, 6–1)	Leong (MAS); W (6–3, 6–1)	Kasidit (THA); W (6–1, 2–6, 6–2)	1st place, gold medalist(s)
Kasidit Samrej	Men's Singles	Bye	Suresh (MAS); W (6–3, 7–5)	Rifqi (INA); W (6–2, 7–5)	Maximus (THA); L (1–6, 6–2, 2–6)	2nd place, silver medalist(s)
Pawit Sornlaksup; Wishaya Trongcharoenchaikul	Men's Doubles	Bounthala / Chansomphou (LAO); W (6–2, 6–3)	Lim Jr. / Olivarez (PHI); W (6–2, 7–6)	Rifqi / Rungkat (INA); W (6–2, 7–6)	Maximus / Pruchya (THA); L (5–7, 6–3, 4–10)	2nd place, silver medalist(s)
Pruchya Isaro; Maximus Jones	Men's Doubles	Bye	Alcantara / Gonzales (PHI); W (6–2, 6–4)	Kurniawan / Susanto (INA); W (6–2, 6–3)	Pawit / Wishaya (THA); W (7–5, 3–6, 10–4)	1st place, gold medalist(s)
Thailand	Men's Team	—N/a	Bye	Malaysia; W 3–0	Indonesia; L 1–2	2nd place, silver medalist(s)
Thasaporn Naklo	Women's Singles	Nugroho (INA); W (2–6, 6–3, 6–3)	Tan (SGP); W (6–1, 6–3)	Eala (PHI); L (1–6, 4–6)	Did no advance	3rd place, bronze medalist(s)
Mananchaya Sawangkaew	Women's Singles	Kuronen (LAO); W (6–2, 6–2)	Desvignes (SGP); W (6–2, 6–1)	Tjen (INA); W (6–4, ret)	Eala (PHI); L (1–6, 2–6)	2nd place, silver medalist(s)
Patcharin Cheapchandej; Thasaporn Naklo	Women's Doubles	Bye	Aludo / Madis (PHI); L (4–6, 2–6)	Did no advance		
Peangtarn Plipuech; Lanlana Tararudee	Women's Doubles	Bye	Nguyễn / Nguyễn (VIE); W (6–1, 6–1)	Junarto / Nugroho (INA); W (7–6, 6–2)	Sutjiadi / Tjen (INA); L (2–6, 1–6)	2nd place, silver medalist(s)
Thailand	Women's Team	—N/a	Bye	Philippines; W 3–0	Indonesia; L 1–2	2nd place, silver medalist(s)
Patcharin Cheapchandej; Pawit Sornlaksup	Mixed Doubles	Bounthala / Vongdala (LAO); W (6–2, 6–2)	Đinh / Nguyễn (VIE); W (6–2, 6–1)	Alcantara / Eala (PHI); W (5–7, 7–5, 10–7)	Peangtarn / Pruchya (THA); L (1–6, 2–6)	2nd place, silver medalist(s)
Pruchya Isaro; Peangtarn Plipuech	Mixed Doubles	Bye	Gonzales / Rivera (PHI); W (6–0, 6–3)	Reinnamah / Susanto (INA); W (4–6, 6–3, 10–5)	Patcharin / Pawit (THA); W (6–1, 6–2)	1st place, gold medalist(s)

== Teqball ==
Team	Event	Group stage			Semifinal	Final	
Team	Event	Opposition Score	Opposition Score	Rank	Opposition Score	Opposition Score	Rank
Uthen Kukeaw	Men's Singles	Agustin (PHI); W 2–0	Hameed (MAS); W 2–0	1 Q	Saw (MYA); W 2–1	Ardika (INA); W 2–0	1st place, gold medalist(s)
Jirati Chanliang; Sorrasak Thaosiri	Men's Doubles	Bá / Lê (VIE); W 2–0	Khin / Thant (MYA); W 2–0	1 Q	Rakhli / Zukeri (MAS); W 2–0	Ardin / Uba (INA); W 2–0	1st place, gold medalist(s)
Jutatip Kuntatong	Women's Singles	Cruz (PHI); W 2–0	Natasha (MAS); W 2–0	1 Q	Aung (MYA); W 2–0	Zikhra (INA); W 2–0	1st place, gold medalist(s)
Jutatip Kuntatong; Suphawadi Wongkhamchan	Women's Doubles	Chaleunsouk / Phommyvong (LAO); W 2–0	Natasha / Syafiqah (MAS); W 2–0	1 Q	Kapito / Pongbura (INA); W 2–0	Aung / Win (MYA); W 2–0	1st place, gold medalist(s)
Phakpong Dejaroen; Suphawadi Wongkhamchan	Mixed Doubles	Lwin / Win (MYA); W 2–0	Đỗ / Trần (VIE); W 2–0	1 Q	Hidayat / Syafiqah (MAS); W 2–0	Lwin / Win (MYA); W 2–0	1st place, gold medalist(s)

== Triathlon ==
Athlete	Event	Final	
Athlete	Event	Time	Rank
Kritsanaphon Phonphai	Men's Individual	00:58:03	6
Tanadol Witsarutsin	Men's Individual	00:58:19	8
Pattarapoom Onsuwan; Thaninthorn Pornnarintip; Phuwadet Rakmanusa	Men's Team Relay	01:14:23	5
Pichayanat Kittivorakij	Women's Individual	01:08:01	7
Suchaya Leenakul	Women's Individual	01:12:08	9
Pichayanat Kittivorakij; Suchaya Leenakul; Ramanya Phanridthidam	Women's Team Relay	01:19:35	5
Pichayanat Kittivorakij; Suchaya Leenakul; Kritsanaphon Phonphai; Thaninthorn Pornnarintip	Mixed Team Relay	01:42:28	6

== Volleyball ==
Team	Event	Group stage				Semifinal	Final / BM	
Team	Event	Opposition Score	Opposition Score	Opposition Score	Rank	Opposition Score	Opposition Score	Rank
Thailand	Men's tournament	Singapore; W 3–1	Laos; W 3–0	Vietnam; W 3–0	1 Q	Philippines; W 3–0	Indonesia; W 3–2	1st place, gold medalist(s)
Thailand	Women's tournament	Singapore; W 3–0	Philippines; W 3–0	—N/a	1 Q	Indonesia; W 3–0	Vietnam; W 3–2	1st place, gold medalist(s)

== Wakeboarding ==
Athlete	Event	Score	Rank
Pisit Mahatthanajatuphat; Lalada Liew; Bhraebhim Pipatsawaddhi; Piti Siridhasnakul	Wakeboard Team	220	1st place, gold medalist(s)
Kantita Chayliam; Annissa Tita Flynn; Songkrod Jomboon; Patrick Wongwut Macarthur	Wake Surf Team	240	1st place, gold medalist(s)
Peeranat Faktongyu; Paktanun Kraisuwansarn; Lalada Liew; Sarawut Niamkhun; Benjamin Phechyuenyong; Benjamin Phechyuenyong	Cable Wakeboard Team	330	1st place, gold medalist(s)

== Water polo ==
Team	Event	Final				
Team	Event	Opposition Score	Opposition Score	Opposition Score	Opposition Score	Rank
Thailand men's	Men's Tournament	Singapore; L 13–14	Philippines; W 28–6	Indonesia; L 7–10	Malaysia; W 21–8	3rd place, bronze medalist(s)
Thailand women's	Women's Tournament	Malaysia; W 34–7	Indonesia; W 19–7	Philippines; W 46–1	Singapore; W 11–8	1st place, gold medalist(s)

== Water skiing ==
Athlete	Event	Score	Rank
Gina Buckley; Nattawut Hapholdee; Weeraya Rosendahl; Fendy Satnurak	Water Ski Slalom	208	3rd place, bronze medalist(s)

== Weightlifting ==
Athlete	Event	Snatch					Clean & Jerk					Total	Rank
Athlete	Event	1	2	3	Result	Rank	1	2	3	Result	Rank	Total	Rank
Theerapong Silachai	Men's 60 kg	126	129	131	131	1	162	165	173	173	1	304	1st place, gold medalist(s)
Patsaphong Thongsuk	Men's 65 kg	~~130~~	130	134	134	3	168	171	173	173	1	307	1st place, gold medalist(s)
Weeraphon Wichuma	Men's 71 kg	142	147	152	152	1	185	195	—	195	1	347	1st place, gold medalist(s)
Natthawut Suepsuan	Men's 79 kg	148	153	155	155	1	~~180~~	180	~~185~~	180	3	335	3rd place, bronze medalist(s)
Worrapot Nasuriwong	Men's 88 kg	143	149	151	151	4	185	190	~~195~~	190	3	341	3rd place, bronze medalist(s)
Sarat Sumpradit	Men's 94 kg	160	165	~~168~~	165	1	191	195	201	201	1	366	1st place, gold medalist(s)
Rungsuriya Yothaphon	Men's +94 kg	154	160	~~164~~	160	1	196	205	~~210~~	205	2	365	2nd place, silver medalist(s)
Thanyathon Sukcharoen	Women's 48 kg	77	80	83	83	2	98	100	~~102~~	100	1	183	2nd place, silver medalist(s)
Surodchana Khambao	Women's 53 kg	82	87	89	89	1	107	110	115	115	1	204	1st place, gold medalist(s)
Suratwadee Yodsarn	Women's 58 kg	93	~~95~~	96	96	2	123	128	~~132~~	128	1	224	1st place, gold medalist(s)
Thanaporn Saetia	Women's 63 kg	98	~~101~~	~~101~~	98	2	120	~~123~~	~~123~~	120	3	218	3rd place, bronze medalist(s)
Phattharathida Wongsing	Women's 69 kg	99	~~101~~	101	101	1	122	128	128	128	1	229	1st place, gold medalist(s)
Chalida Taingdee	Women's 77 kg	90	92	94	94	1	110	115	120	120	1	214	1st place, gold medalist(s)
Duangaksorn Chaidee	Women's +77 kg	105	110	113	113	1	135	140	145	145	1	258	1st place, gold medalist(s)

== Woodball ==
Stroke

Athlete	Event	R1	R2	R3	R4	R5	R6	Total	Rank
Phongsathon Khlaidam	Men's Single Stroke	51	43	48	42	39	44	267	5
Nonthawat Kongprawes	Men's Single Stroke	44	40	40	48	42	48	262	4
Chonlachart Plengrat	Men's Single Stroke	43	41	42	41	42	46	255	3
Peeraphon Sararat	Men's Single Stroke	45	37	39	46	47	39	253	2nd place, silver medalist(s)
Weerasak Srisamoot	Men's Single Stroke	51	43	49	46	51	47	287	11
Polrawat Wichaiphanphak	Men's Single Stroke	43	39	41	42	42	42	249	1st place, gold medalist(s)
Thailand men's	Men's Team	175	157	162	171	165	—N/a	830	1st place, gold medalist(s)
Patcharin Audomthip	Women's Single Stroke	45	50	48	48	41	42	274	3
Siriwan Kangkeeree	Women's Single Stroke	41	45	47	49	49	40	271	1st place, gold medalist(s)
Klissana Khaodee	Women's Single Stroke	45	50	43	52	47	47	284	5
Sirinya Nusi	Women's Single Stroke	50	50	45	45	52	49	291	7
Autchara Thongnim	Women's Single Stroke	41	52	42	48	46	44	273	2nd place, silver medalist(s)
Kunlanat Worabun	Women's Single Stroke	51	51	45	47	49	51	294	8
Thailand Women's	Women's Team	172	195	175	189	183	—N/a	914	1st place, gold medalist(s)

Match Play

Team	Event	Group Stage			Rank
Team	Event	Opposition Score	Opposition Score	Opposition Score	Rank
Thailand men's	Men's Team Fairway(Match Play)	Singapore; W 3–0	Malaysia; W 3–0	Indonesia; W 2–1	1st place, gold medalist(s)
Thailand women's	Women's Team Fairway(Match Play)	Indonesia; W 2–1	Malaysia; W 3–0	Singapore; W 3–0	1st place, gold medalist(s)

== Wushu ==
Changquan - Daoshu - Gunshu

Athlete	Event	Final				
Athlete	Event	Changquan	Daoshu	Gunshu	Total	Rank
Sujinda Yangrungrawin	Men's Changquan - Daoshu - Gunshu	9.496	9.450	9.616	28.562	8

Duilian Weapon

Athlete	Event	Final	
Athlete	Event	Total	Rank
Pitaya Yangrungrawin; Sujinda Yangrungrawin; Wanchai Yodyinghathaikun	Men's Duilian Weapon	9.763	1st place, gold medalist(s)
Naowarat Saeyang; Naphalai Saeyang	Women's Duilian Weapon	9.646	2nd place, silver medalist(s)

Nanquan - Nandao - Nangun

Athlete	Event	Final				
Athlete	Event	Nanquan	Nandao	Nangun	Total	Rank
Pitaya Yangrungrawin	Men's Nanquan - Nandao - Nangun	9.726	9.740	9.726	29.196	6
Wanchai Yodyinghathaikun	Men's Nanquan - Nandao - Nangun	9.583	9.513	9.583	28.509	9

Sanda

Athlete	Event	Quarterfinals	Semifinals	Final	
Athlete	Event	Opposition Score	Opposition Score	Opposition Score	Rank
Charuwat Khunphet	Men's 65 kg	Bye	Hongpaseuth (LAO); W 2–0	Marbun (INA); L 0–2	2nd place, silver medalist(s)
Thawatchai Kaithongsuk	Men's 70 kg	Trương (VIE); L 0–2	Did not advance		
Banthita Wirachianchot	Women's 56 kg	Aukkhasone (LAO); W 2–0	Cherry (MYA); L 0–2	Did not advance	3rd place, bronze medalist(s)
Saowanee Chanthamunee	Women's 60 kg	Junai (MAS); W 2–0	Nguyễn (VIE); L WPD	Did not advance	3rd place, bronze medalist(s)

Taijiquan - Taijijian

Athlete	Event	Final			
Athlete	Event	Taijiquan	Taijijian	Total	Rank
Katisak Goolsawadmongkol	Men's Taijiquan - Taijijian	9.656	9.700	19.362	9
Thianchai Saetho	Men's Taijiquan - Taijijian	8.400	8.888	17.733	13
Sirinapha Horchue	Women's Taijiquan - Taijijian	8.513	8.706	17.219	11
