= Malaysia at the 2025 SEA Games =

Malaysia at the 2025 Southeast Asian Games
- IOC code: MAS
- NOC: Olympic Council of Malaysia

in Bangkok and Chonburi, Thailand 9 – 20 December 2025
- Competitors: 1,142 in 50 sports
- Flag bearers: Andre Anura (athletics); Aaliyah Yoong (waterski)
- Officials: 515
- Medals Ranked 4th: Gold 57 Silver 57 Bronze 117 Total 231

Southeast Asian Games appearances (overview)
- 1959; 1961; 1965; 1967; 1969; 1971; 1973; 1975; 1977; 1979; 1981; 1983; 1985; 1987; 1989; 1991; 1993; 1995; 1997; 1999; 2001; 2003; 2005; 2007; 2009; 2011; 2013; 2015; 2017; 2019; 2021; 2023; 2025; 2027; 2029

Malaysia participated in the 2025 Southeast Asian Games from 9 to 20 December 2025. The Malaysian contingent consist of 1,142 athletes, competing in all 50 sports.

== Background ==
On 8 July 2025, the Olympic Council of Malaysia (OCM) appointed Nurul Huda Abdullah as chef de mission (CDM) for the 33rd SEA Games in Thailand. OCM also appointed Dato' Kenny Goh Chee Keong (General Secretary of Badminton Asia), Nazmizan Mohamad and Jivan Mohan as deputy CDM.

On 3 December 2025, it was announced that long jumper Andre Anura and waterskier Aaliyah Yoong would be the flag bearers for this edition. It was also announced by the CDM that a total of 200 medals were being targeted regardless of colour to reduce the pressure on the players.

== Competitors ==
The following is the list of the number of competitors participating at the Games per sport/discipline.

Sport	Men	Women	Total
Artistic swimming	2	10	12
Badminton	10	10	20
Basketball	4	4	8
Canoeing	8	5	13
Baseball	24	4	28
Cricket	18	18	36
Field hockey	18	18	36
Football	22	23	45
Gymnastics	4	12	16
Handball	18	0	18
Hockey5s	10	10	20
Ice hockey	23	23	46
Ju-jitsu	5	2	7
Kabaddi	15	13	27
Pétanque	11	11	22
Polo	9	0	9
Sailing	12	6	18
Swimming	11	11	22
Sepak takraw	17	15	32
Softball	16	16	32
Taekwondo	8	7	15
Tennis	5	5	10
Water skiing	4	4	8
Woodball	12	12	24
Total	271	226	497

== Medal summary ==
=== Medal by sport ===
Medals by sport
Sport	1st place, gold medalist(s)	2nd place, silver medalist(s)	3rd place, bronze medalist(s)	Total	Rank
Aquathlon	0	0	1	1	(4)
Archery	1	4	2	7	(3)
Aquatics - Artistic Swimming	0	1	0	1	(3)
Aquatics - Diving	2	0	1	3	(1)
Aquatics - Swimming	2	3	5	10	(6)
Athletics	5	5	6	16	(5)
Badminton	1	2	6	9	(3)
Baseball - 5s	0	0	1	1	(3)
Basketball - 3x3	0	0	2	2	(4)
Bowling	2	1	4	7	(1)
Boxing	0	0	2	2	(9)
Canoe/Kayak - Slalom	0	0	3	3	(6)
Chess	0	1	1	2	(5)
Cricket	2	1	1	4	(1)
Cycling - Mountain Bike	0	1	0	1	(3)
Cycling - Road	0	2	1	3	(3)
Cycling - Track	4	1	0	5	(1)
Duathlon	0	0	1	1	(5)
Equestrian	1	1	1	3	(3)
Esports	1	1	0	2	(3)
Fencing	0	2	0	2	(5)
Field hockey	2	0	0	2	(1)
Figure Skating	1	0	0	1	(2)
Floorball	0	0	1	1	(4)
Football	0	0	1	1	(4)
Futsal	0	0	1	1	(4)
Gymnastics	4	3	3	10	(2)
Hockey - 5s	1	1	0	2	(1)
Indoor hockey	0	2	0	2	(3)
Ju-jitsu	0	1	1	2	(5)
Judo	1	0	1	2	(5)
Kabaddi	1	1	4	6	(3)
Karate	2	1	7	10	(4)
Kickboxing	0	0	2	2	(6)
Muay Thai	3	3	4	10	(2)
Netball	1	0	0	1	(1)
Pencak Silat	3	2	1	6	(3)
Petanque	0	0	4	4	(7)
Polo	1	0	1	2	(2)
Rugby sevens	0	1	0	1	(3)
Sailing	0	5	3	8	(4)
Sepak Takraw	2	0	2	4	(3)
Shooting	4	1	8	13	(5)
Snooker	2	0	5	7	(2)
Squash	4	2	0	6	(1)
Table Tennis	0	2	5	7	(3)
Taekwondo	1	1	4	6	(5)
Tennis	0	0	3	3	(4)
Teqball	0	0	5	5	(4)
Triathlon	0	0	1	1	(4)
Water Ski & Wake Board	0	1	1	2	(3)
Weightlifting	0	3	2	5	(5)
Woodball	0	0	4	4	(3)
Wushu	3	1	5	9	(2)

=== Medal by date ===
Medals by date
Day	Date	1st place, gold medalist(s)	2nd place, silver medalist(s)	3rd place, bronze medalist(s)	Total
1	10 Dec	2	2	10	14
2	11 Dec	1	10	11	22
3	12 Dec	7	1	13	21
4	13 Dec	6	2	15	23
5	14 Dec	4	8	22	34
6	15 Dec	6	5	10	21
7	16 Dec	4	3	9	16
8	17 Dec	11	14	16	41
9	18 Dec	5	4	3	12
10	19 Dec	10	8	7	25
11	20 Dec	1	0	0	1
Total		57	57	116	230

=== Medalists ===
Medal	Name	Sport	Event	Date
Gold	Adrian Andy Albert; Luqman Nul Hakim Ahmad Shukran; Mohamad Akhimullah Anuar Esook; Mohamad Akmal Yussaini; Mohamad Kamarulzaman Kamaruddin; Muhammad Adib Sufian Mat Ruslee; Muhammad Arif Shafie Ishak; Muhammad Muhibuddin Moharam; Shafiq Ikhmal Daniel Suzaini; Syarman Mat Tee	Hockey – 5s	Men's Team	10 December
Gold	Seah Jing Ying; Yow Mei Yee; Wong Zin	Taekwondo – Poomsae	Women's Recognized Team	10 December
Gold	Rachel Yeoh Li Wen	Gymnastics – Artistic	Women's Uneven Bars	11 December
Gold	Nani Sahirah Maryata	Athletics	Women's Shot Put	12 December
Gold	Grace Wong Xiu Mei	Athletics	Women's Hammer Throw	12 December
Gold	Muhammad Sharul Aimy	Gymnastics – Artistic	Men's Vault	12 December
Gold	Yeap Kang Xian	Gymnastics – Artistic	Women's Balance Beam	12 December
Gold	Thevendran Kaliana Sundram	Karate – Kumite	Men's –55 kg	12 December
Gold	Shahmalarani Chandran	Karate – Kumite	Women's –50 kg	12 December
Gold	Thor Chuan Leong	Snooker – 6-Red Snooker	Men's Singles	12 December
Gold	Khiew Hoe Yean	Aquatics – Swimming	Men's 200m Freestyle	13 December
Gold	Jonah Chang Rigan	Athletics	Men's Shot Put	13 December
Gold	Ahmad Faiz Mohammad Noor; Ahmad Zubaidi Zulkifle; Ainool Hafizs Md Yatim; Amirkhan Malik; Aslam Khan Malik; Muhammad Aiman Zaquan Muhammad Ridzuan; Muhammad Akram Abd Malek; Muhammad Amir Azim Abd Shukor; Muhammad Azri Azhar Amaluz Zaman; Muhammad Haziq Aiman Mohd Hafiz; Muhammad Syahadat Ramli; Muhammad Waziq Irfan Zabrani; Pavandeep Singh Jagjit Singh; Sharvin Muniyandy; Syed Aziz Syed Mubarak; Vijay Unni Suresh; Virandeep Singh Jagjit Singh; Wan Muhammad Azam Wan Ahmad	Cricket	Men's T20	13 December
Gold	Fang Ze Zeng	Figure Skating	Men's Singles	13 December
Gold	Amir Daniel Abdul Majeed	Judo	Men's –81kg	13 December
Gold	Loh Ying Ting; Mandy Cebelle Chen; Sydney Chin Sy Xuan	Wushu – Taolu	Women's Duilian Bare-Handed	13 December
Gold	Pearly Tan Koong Le; Thinaah Muralitharan	Badminton	Women's Doubles	14 December
Gold	Nur Syafiqah Hamzah	Pencak Silat – Seni	Women's Tunggal	14 December
Gold	Johnathan Wong Guanjie	Shooting – Pistol & Rifle	Men's 10m Air Pistol	14 December
Gold	Aidil Aiman Azwawi; Amirul Zazwan Amir; Farhan Adam; Mohamad Azlan Alias; Mohammad Syahir Mohd Rosdi; Muhammad Afifuddin Mohd Razali; Muhammad Hafizul Hayazi Adnan; Muhammad Haziq Hairul Nizam; Muhammad Noraizat Mohd Nordin; Muhammad Zarif Marican Ibrahim Marican; Muhammad Zulkifli Abd Razak; Zuleffendi Sumari	Sepak Takraw	Men's Team Regu	14 December
Gold	Khiew Hoe Yean	Aquatics – Swimming	Men's 400m Freestyle	15 December
Gold	Andre Anura	Athletics	Men's Long Jump	15 December
Gold	Bernice See Qin Nin; Carol Na Yaun Qi; Lai Yun Jo; Lim Xian Yar; Maia Ong Xiao Han; Mavia Wong Weng Qin; Ng Joe Ee; Syamimi Amalia Shahrizam; Valerie Ng Zi Yi	Gymnastics – Rhythmic	Women's Team	15 December
Gold	Lim Kok Leong; Moh Keen Hoo; Thor Chuan Leong	Snooker – 6-Red Snooker	Men's Team	15 December
Gold	Tan Cheong Min	Wushu – Taolu	Women's Nanquan–Nandao–Nangun	15 December
Gold	Loh Ying Ting; Pang Pui Yee; Tan Cheong Min	Wushu – Taolu	Women's Duilian Weapon	15 December
Gold	Muhammad Irfan Shamshuddin	Athletics	Men's Discus Throw	16 December
Gold	Muhammad Rafiq Ismail; Muhammad Syazirol Shamsudin	Bowling	Men's Doubles	16 December
Gold	Megan Ding Min Ern	Equestrian – Dressage	Individual	16 December
Gold	Ong Chee Kheng	Shooting – Shotgun	Men's Trap	16 December
Gold	Ahmad Faiz Mohammad Noor; Ahmad Zubaidi Zulkifle; Ainool Hafizs Md Yatim; Amirkhan Malik; Aslam Khan Malik; Muhammad Aiman Zaquan Muhammad Ridzuan; Muhammad Akram Abd Malek; Muhammad Amir Azim Abd Shukor; Muhammad Azri Azhar Amaluz Zaman; Muhammad Haziq Aiman Mohd Hafiz; Muhammad Syahadat Ramli; Muhammad Waziq Irfan Zabrani; Pavandeep Singh Jagjit Singh; Sharvin Muniyandy; Syed Aziz Syed Mubarak; Vijay Unni Suresh; Virandeep Singh Jagjit Singh; Wan Muhammad Azam Wan Ahmad	Cricket	Men's T10	17 December
Gold	Afrina Balqis Ibdhi Har Ali; Arfah Hazira Syahiruddin Lubis; Hanis Wahidah Mohamad Dashuki; Queenie Lim Mae Shen; Qurratul Ain Nurfarisha Mohd Nizam; Sharifah Alia Husna Syed Fakrurrozi	E-Sports	Women's Mobile Legends: Bang Bang Team	17 December
Gold	Yan Jia Chi	Muay Thai – Waikru	Women's Individual	17 December
Gold	Wassof Rumijam	Muay Thai	Men's –54kg	17 December
Gold	Muhammad Mikail Ghazali Zulfikar	Muay Thai	Men's –57kg	17 December
Gold	Adalia Jasmine Mustazal; Ashwinii Kali Tass; Farwiza Mohd Fauzi; Haisya Maisara Abdul Qayyum; Nordiyanah Noorsabadinee; Nur Amisya Khairud Din; Nur Izzazrin Aizie Ahmad Yani; Nur Syafazliyana Mohd Ali; Nurfahira Abdul Razak; Nuriz Shazleen Amir Din; Siti Maisarah Affandi; Siti Nur Hidayatul Akhma Suhhaimi	Netball	Women's Team	17 December
Gold	Muhammad Izzul Irfan Marzuki	Pencak Silat – Tanding	Men –65kg	17 December
Gold	Ummi Mashitah Hassan	Pencak Silat – Tanding	Women –60kg	17 December
Gold	Gan Chen Jie	Shooting – Pistol & Rifle	Women's 50m Rifle 3 Position	17 December
Gold	Harith Danial Jefri; Low Wa Sern	Squash	Men's Jumbo Doubles (U21)	17 December
Gold	Harith Danial Jefri; Sehveetrraa Kumar	Squash	Mixed Jumbo Doubles (U21)	17 December
Gold	Alang Ariff Aqil Muhammad Ghazalli; Mohd Juwaidi Mazuki; Muhammad Aiman Syafiq Mohd Tariki	Archery – Compound	Men's Team	18 December
Gold	Muhammad Ridwan Sahrom	Cycling – Track	Men's Keirin	18 December
Gold	Abdul Azim Aliyas; Lau Newjoe; Muhammad Adam Hakimi Nazuan; Muhammad Hafiq Mohd Jafri; Muhammad Yusri Shaari	Cycling – Track	Men's Team Pursuit	18 December
Gold	Nur Aisyah Mohamad Zubir	Cycling – Track	Women's Scratch Race	18 December
Gold	Dhaanushruban Raveechandran; Nantha Kanesan; Prithiswaran Kaliyappan; Suresh Leong Kim Seng; Tharveen Mahesan; Viknesshwaran Gunaseelan	Kabaddi	Men's 3 Stars	18 December
Gold	Nurqayyum Nazmi Mohamad Nazim; Yong Rui Jie	Aquatics – Diving	Men's Synchronised 3m Springboard	19 December
Gold	Nur Eilisha Rania Muhammad Abrar Raj; Nurul Farisya Alia Affendi	Aquatics – Diving	Women's Synchronised 10m Platform	19 December
Gold	Adania Mohd Redzwan; Natasha Mohamed Roslan; Nur Hazirah Ramli; Sin Li Jane	Bowling	Women's Team	19 December
Gold	Mohamad Akmal Nazimi Jusena; Muhammad Fadhil Mohd Zonis; Muhammad Ridwan Sahrom	Cycling – Track	Men's Team Sprint	19 December
Gold	Alfarico Lance Liau Jr; Amanraj Singh; Faiz Helmi Zali; Mohamad Rafaizul Mohamad Saini; Mohd Fitri Saari; Mughni Mohamad Kamal; Muhamad Faris Harizan; Muhammad Amirul Hamizan Azahar; Muhammad Azrai Aizad Abu Kamal; Muhammad Hafizuddin Othman; Muhammad Marhan Mohd Jalil; Muhammad Najib Abu Hassan; Muhammad Shafiq Hassan; Muhajir Abdu Rauf; Nik Muhammad Aiman Nik Rozemi; Norshafiq Sumantri; Shello Silverius; Syed Mohamad Syafiq Syed Cholan	Hockey – Field	Men's Team	19 December
Gold	Anith Humaira Bharudin; Dayang Nuramirah Abang Mahadini; Fatin Shafika Mahd Sukri; Hanis Nadiah Onn; Juliani Mohamad Din; Khairunnisa Ayuni Mohd Sharuddin; Noor Hasliza Md Ali; Nur Afiqah Syahzani Azhar; Nur Hazlinda Zainal Abidin; Nur Insyirah Effarizal; Nur Nabila Alia Yussaini; Nuramirah Shakirah Zulkifli; Nurmaizatul Hanim Syafi Sheik Fuad; Nurul Fatin Fatiah Azman; Siti Nur Arfah Mohd Nor; Siti Nur Atika Shaikh Maznan; Siti Zalia Nasir; Siti Zulaikha Husain	Hockey – Field	Women's Team	19 December
Gold	His Highness Prince Muhammad Shah of Pahang; Amran Selamat; Ikwan Hafiz Jamaludin; Mohd Zulhelmi Nadzar; Muhammad Edham Haji Shaharuddin; Muhammad Shahir Akmal Mohd Shah; Tengku Ahmad Shazril Ezzani Tengku Suleiman	Polo	4 – 6 Goals	19 December
Gold	Haritz Iklil Hessly Hafiz	Shooting – Pistol & Rifle	Men's 50m Rifle 3 Position	19 December
Gold	Sanjay Jeeva	Squash	Men's Singles	19 December
Gold	Noor Ainaa Amani Ampandi	Squash	Women's Singles	19 December
Silver	Aaron Chia Teng Fong; Aidil Sholeh Ali Sadikin; Chen Tang Jie; Eogene Ewe Eon; Hoh Shou Wei; Hoo Pang Ron; Leong Jun Hao; Man Wei Chong; Soh Wooi Yik; Tee Kai Wun	Badminton	Men's Team	10 December
Silver	Dian Nursyakira Najwa Al Wadqa Nazeri; Hasya Syahida Saifuddin; Nor Adilah Abdul Malik; Nur Anis Erysha Zamri; Nur Qistina Syamimi Mohamad Roslan; Nur Shafika Ahmad Kamil; Nurfatin Dizana Mohd Zaidi; Nurul Safiqah Mat Isa; Surizan Awang Noh; Wan Nur Syafiqah Syahirah Wan Nordin	Hockey – 5s	Women's Team	10 December
Silver	Arvin Shaun Singh Chahal; Khiew Hoe Yean; Muhammad Dhuha Zulfikry; Terence Ng Shin Jian	Aquatics – Swimming	Men's 4 × 200m Freestyle Relay	11 December
Silver	Andre Anura	Athletics	Men's Triple Jump	11 December
Silver	Sadat Marzuqi Ajisan	Athletics	Men's Hammer Throw	11 December
Silver	Queenie Ting Kung Ni	Athletics	Women's Discus Throw	11 December
Silver	Zulfikri Zulkifli	Cycling – Mountain Bike	Men's Cross-Country Eliminator	11 December
Silver	Luqman Al Hafiz Zulfa	Gymnastics – Artistic	Men's Floor	11 December
Silver	Joelle Wong Ai	Ju-Jitsu – Ne-Waza	Women's -57kg	11 December
Silver	Luqman Syah Ahmad Jasman Syah; Mohamad Haznil Henry; Muhammad Aiqal Asmadie; Muhammad Arif Hafizi Hishamadi	Karate – Kata	Men's Team	11 December
Silver	Muhammad Syafiq Zuber	Taekwondo – Kyorugi	Men's –87kg	11 December
Silver	Aaliyah Yoong Hanifah; Adam Yoong Hanifah; Aiden Yoong Hanifah; Phillipa Clare Yoong Li Foong	Water Ski & Wake Board	Water Ski Slalom Team	11 December
Silver	Wu Hao Zheng; Tang Khai Yee	Aquatics – Artistic Swimming	Mixed Duet	12 December
Silver	Phee Jinq En	Aquatics – Swimming	Women's 100m Breaststroke	13 December
Silver	Ng Jing Xuan	Athletics	Women's Javelin Throw	13 December
Silver	Aaron Chia Teng Fong; Soh Wooi Yik	Badminton	Men's Doubles	14 December
Silver	Nur Aisyah Mohamad Zubir	Cycling – Road	Women's Criterium	14 December
Silver	Alvyromela Antonius; Dinah Syafiqah Sadali; Josie Mavcellina Gone; Kajolin Jenisin; Noor Azzuwa Azhar; Nur Aliya Balqis Abdul Rahman; Nur Aliya Nabila Samsubahari; Nur Izzah Azizan; Nurin Hannan Abd Hadi; Rozliana Mohd Ridwan; Siti Nursyamimi Tajudin; Valerie Juan; Wan Noor Shafiqa Mohd Radza	Rugby - 7s	Women's Team	14 December
Silver	Khairulnizam Mohd Afendy	Sailing – Dinghy	Men's ILCA7	14 December
Silver	Nur Shazrin Mohamad Latif	Sailing – Dinghy	Women's ILCA6	14 December
Silver	Nur Zafrina Syuhada Mohd Zailan	Sailing – Dinghy	Girl's ILCA4	14 December
Silver	Muhammad Fauzi Kaman Shah; Juni Karimah Noor Jamali	Sailing – Dinghy	Mixed 470	14 December
Silver	Muhamad Aznil Bidin	Weightlifting	Men's –65kg	14 December
Silver	Andrew Goh Zheng Yen	Aquatics – Swimming	Men's 50m Breaststroke	15 December
Silver	Aliff Iman Mohd Fahimi; Danish Iftikhar Muhammad Roslee; Jonathan Nyepa; Pengiran Aidil Auf Hajam	Athletics	Men's 4 x 100m Relay	15 December
Silver	Natasha Mohamed Roslan	Bowling	Women's Singles	15 December
Silver	Muhammad Erry Hidayat	Weightlifting	Men's –79kg	15 December
Silver	Pang Pui Yee	Wushu – Taolu	Women's Changquan & Jianshu–Qianshu	15 December
Silver	Bernice See Qin Nin; Carol Na Yaun Qi; Maia Ong Xiao Han; Syamimi Amalia Shahrizam; Valerie Ng Zi Yi	Gymnastics – Rhythmic	Women's Group – 5 Ribbons	16 December
Silver	Bernice See Qin Nin; Carol Na Yaun Qi; Lim Xian Yar; Syamimi Amalia Shahrizam; Valerie Ng Zi Yi	Gymnastics – Rhythmic	Women's Group – 3 Balls + 2 Hoops	16 December
Silver	Mohamad Syahmi Nor Ghazali	Weightlifting	Men's –94kg	16 December
Silver	Quik Chern Xin	Archery – Recurve	Men's Individual	17 December
Silver	Ariana Nur Dania Mohamad Zairi; Joey Tan Xing Lei; Ku Nurin Afiqah Ku Ruzaimi	Archery – Recurve	Women's Team	17 December
Silver	Muhammad Syafiq Busthamin; Ariana Nur Dania Mohamad Zairi	Archery – Recurve	Mixed Team	17 December
Silver	Nur Aisyah Mohamad Zubir	Cycling – Road	Women's Road Race	17 December
Silver	Ealtond Rayner; Hazziq Danish Mohamad Rizwan; Idreen Abdul Jamal; Muhammad Danish Fitri Razman; Muhammad Haqqullah Ahmad Shahrul Zaman; Muhammad Qayyum Ariffin Mohd Suhairi	E-Sports	Men's Mobile Legends: Bang Bang Team	17 December
Silver	Adam Hariz Kamaludin; Arysha Haya Kanda; Norinne Ira Dewal Md Ali; Shoorendran Nageswaran	Equestrian – Show Jumping	Team	17 December
Silver	Insyad Rumijam	Muay Thai	Men's –51kg	17 December
Silver	Eva Anatasia Warren	Muay Thai	Women's –48kg	17 December
Silver	Nur Amisha Azrilrizal	Muay Thai	Women's –51kg	17 December
Silver	Muhammad Amirul Hakim Jaaffar	Pencak Silat – Tanding	Men –50kg	17 December
Silver	Muhamad Helmi	Pencak Silat – Tanding	Men –70kg	17 December
Silver	Alia Husna Budruddin; Gan Chen Jie; Nur Suryani Mohamed Taibi	Shooting – Pistol & Rifle	Women's 50m Rifle 3 Position Team	17 December
Silver	Choong Javen; Wong Qi Shen	Table tennis	Men's Doubles	17 December
Silver	Wong Qi Shen; Tee Ai Xin	Table tennis	Mixed Doubles	17 December
Silver	Mohd Juwaidi Mazuki	Archery – Compound	Men's Individual	18 December
Silver	Cheng Xing Han; Heng Yu Shern; Kaerlan Vinod Kamalanathan; Saif Nordin	Fencing	Men's Foil Team	18 December
Silver	Ananthi Muniandy; Darsini Jagjit Singh; Mavithra Ramakrishnan; Nanthini Krishnan; Sivashangkari Hariselvam; Uchira Nambiar Prem Kumar	Kabaddi	Women's 3 Stars	18 December
Silver	Abdul Latif Mansor; Ahmad Faizul Aswad Mohamed; Ahmad Hakhimi Ahmad Shukri; Ahmad Syukri Abdul Aziz; Asmawi Azman; Asri Azman; Khairulnizam Mohd Afendy; Mohd Akiyuddin Mat Zaki; Muhamad Uzair Amin Mohd Yusof; Juni Karimah Noor Jamali; Khairunnisa Mohd Afendy; Nur Amirah Hamid	Sailing	Mixed Keelboat SSL47	18 December
Silver	Poh Yu Tian; Yeoh Li Tian	Chess	Men's Rapid Doubles	19 December
Silver	Aina Najwa Abdul Rahman; Ainna Hamizah Hashim; Ainur Amelina Muhammad Ridhawn; Aisya Eleesa Firdauz; Amalin Sorfina Abu Jimi; Arianna Natasya Benn Rakquidean; Dhanusri Sri Muhunan; Irdina Beh Nabil; Mahirah Izzati Ismail; Mas Elysa Yasmin Zulkifli; Musfirah Nur Ainaa Azmi; Nazarul Hidayah Husna Razali; Nur Dania Syuhada Abedul Samad; Nur Izzatul Syafiqa Fajrol As; Siow Tzin Yee; Suabika Manivannan; Wan Julia Wan Mohd Rosli; Winifred Anne Duraisingam	Cricket	Women's T20	19 December
Silver	Lau Newjoe	Cycling – Track	Men's Points Race	19 December
Silver	Sebastian Jia Sheng Lim; Syed Adam Emir Putra Syed Aidi Putra; Terry Lee Dong Wei; Wong Tzer Chyuan	Fencing	Men's Sabre Team	19 December
Silver	Abdul Khaliq Hamirin; Faridzul Afiq Mohd; Meor Muhamad Azuan Hasan; Mohamad Ashran Hamsani; Mohamad Hazrul Faiz Ahmad Sobri; Muhamad Izham Azhar; Muhammad Aslam Mohamed Hanafiah; Muhammad Firdaus Omar; Muhammad Hamiz Mohd Ahir; Muhammad Najmi Farizal Jazlan; Shahmie Irfan Suhaimi; Shazril Irwan Nazli	Hockey – Indoor	Men's Team	19 December
Silver	Farah Ayuni Yahya; Fazilla Sylvester Silin; Fitrinur Amiera Ramlee; Iren Hussin; Nor Asfarina Isahyifiqa Issahhidun; Norhasikin Halim; Norshafiqha Ishak; Nur Aisyah Yaacob; Nur Atira Mohamad Ismail; Nuraslinda Said; Putri Nur Batrisyi Nor Nawawi; Raja Norsharina Raja Shabuddin	Hockey – Indoor	Women's Team	19 December
Silver	Duncan Lee Yung Yii	Squash	Men's Singles	19 December
Silver	Yee Xin Ying	Squash	Women's Singles	19 December
Bronze	Phee Jinq En	Aquatics – Swimming	Women's 50m Breaststroke	10 December
Bronze	Cheng Su Yin; Eng Ler Qi; Go Pei Kee; Letshanaa Karupathevan; Pearly Tan Koong Le; Siti Zulaikha Muhammad Azmi Tan; Teoh Mei Xing; Thinaah Muralitharan; Toh Ee Wei; Wong Ling Ching	Badminton	Women's Team	10 December
Bronze	Mohamad Nazrin Najib	Canoe/Kayak – Slalom	Men's Kayak Single	10 December
Bronze	Azlyn Farhana Muhammad Azmi Tan	Canoe/Kayak – Slalom	Women's Canoe Single	10 December
Bronze	Mohamad Nurul Azwan Ahmad Temizi	Petanque	Men's Shooting	10 December
Bronze	His Highness Prince Muhammad Shah of Pahang; Abdul Rashid Hasnan; Amran Selamat; Azfar Mustapha; Mohd Zulhelmi Nadzar; Muhammad Edham Haji Shaharuddin; Muhammad Shahir Akmal Mohd Shah	Polo	2 – 4 Goals	10 December
Bronze	Aidil Aiman Azwawi; Amirul Zazwan Amir; Farhan Adam; Mohamad Azlan Alias; Muhammad Hairul Hazizi Haidzir; Muhammad Zarif Marican Ibrahim Marican; Norfaizzul Abd Razak; Zuleffendi Sumari	Sepak Takraw – Chinlone	Men's Linking	10 December
Bronze	Kamisah Khamis; Nadillatul Rosmahani Saidin; Razmah Anam; Siti Hadifitri Navilla Jumidil; Siti Hadinavilla Jumidil; Siti Norliafitri Musmuliadi; Siti Norzubaidah Che Ab Wahab; Veronica Asli	Sepak Takraw – Chinlone	Women's Linking	10 December
Bronze	Chin Ken Haw	Taekwondo – Poomsae	Men's Freestyle Individual	10 December
Bronze	Chin Ken Haw; Jason Loo Jun Wei; Randy Owen Augustine Linggi	Taekwondo – Poomsae	Men's Recognized Team	10 December
Bronze	Tong Yu Jing	Aquatics – Swimming	Men's 50m Freestyle	11 December
Bronze	Danish Iftikhar Muhammad Roslee	Athletics	Men's 100m	11 December
Bronze	Jackie Wong Siew Cheer	Athletics	Men's Hammer Throw	11 December
Bronze	Chang Zi Fueng; Chong Zhen Yang; Ooi Xian Fu; Ting Chun Hong	Basketball – 3x3	Men's Team	11 December
Bronze	Foo Suet Ying; Pang Hui Pin; Tan Pei Jie; Tan Sin Jie	Basketball – 3x3	Women's Team	11 December
Bronze	Ahmad Zikri Mohd Nor Arif	Canoe/Kayak – Slalom	Men's Canoe Single	11 December
Bronze	Muhammad Sharul Aimy	Gymnastics – Artistic	Men's Pommel Horse	11 December
Bronze	Yeap Kan Xian	Gymnastics – Artistic	Women's Vault	11 December
Bronze	Cassandra J Poyong	Ju-Jitsu – Ne-Waza	Women's –57kg	11 December
Bronze	Ivy Olivera Donny; Naccy Nelly Evvaferra Rojin; Niathalia Sherawinnie Yampil; Lovelly Anne Robberth	Karate – Kata	Women's Team	11 December
Bronze	Aiden Yoong Hanifah; Chew Siao Wen; Leong Yang Hou; Low Yi Ning	Water Ski & Wake Board	Wake Surf Team	11 December
Bronze	Tan Khai Xin	Aquatics – Swimming	Men's 400m Individual Medley	12 December
Bronze	Mohamad Armin Zahryl Abdul Latif	Athletics	Men's 110m Hurdles	12 December
Bronze	Aina Najwa Abdul Rahman; Ainna Hamizah Hashim; Ainur Amelina Muhammad Ridhawn; Aisya Eleesa Firdauz; Amalin Sorfina Abu Jimi; Arianna Natasya Benn Rakquidean; Dhanusri Sri Muhunan; Irdina Beh Nabil; Mahirah Izzati Ismail; Mas Elysa Yasmin Zulkifli; Musfirah Nur Ainaa Azmi; Nazarul Hidayah Husna Razali; Nur Dania Syuhada Abedul Samad; Nur Izzatul Syafiqa Fajrol As; Siow Tzin Yee; Suabika Manivannan; Wan Julia Wan Mohd Rosli; Winifred Anne Duraisingam	Cricket	Women's T10	12 December
Bronze	Geerijaieswaran Sivanesan	Karate – Kumite	Men's –60kg	12 December
Bronze	Sureeya Sankar Hari Sankar	Karate – Kumite	Men's –67kg	12 December
Bronze	Adeola Fay Robert	Karate – Kumite	Women's –55kg	12 December
Bronze	Ayzek Hakimi Safingan; Sharifah Afiqah Farzana Syed Ali	Petanque	Mixed Doubles	12 December
Bronze	Haritz Iklil Hessly Hafiz; Gan Chen Jie	Shooting – Pistol & Rifle	Mixed 10m Air Rifle Team	12 December
Bronze	Joseph Lee Joon Kit	Shooting – Shotgun	Men's Skeet	12 December
Bronze	Fu Cern Put Thai	Taekwondo – Kyorugi	Men's –58kg	12 December
Bronze	Arjun Raj Ram Bharat	Taekwondo – Kyorugi	Men's –68kg	12 December
Bronze	Azmi Ahmad; Ismail Abdul Rahman; Khairuazree Sahabudin; Sharnuddin Ngah; Wan Mohd Fadli Wan Abdullah; Zulkifli Said	Woodball	Men's Fairway Team	12 December
Bronze	Aniah Hassan; Loo Lee Lee; Nor Rinda Ramli; Noryomhaslinda Senayan; Nur Zalilah Mohd Sohaimi; Widilestari Setianingsih	Woodball	Women's Fairway Team	12 December
Bronze	Arvin Shaun Singh Chahal	Aquatics – Swimming	Men's 200m Freestyle	13 December
Bronze	Danish Iftikhar Muhammad Roslee	Athletics	Men's 200m	13 December
Bronze	Nor Izzatul Fazlia Mohamad Tahir	Judo	Women's +78kg	13 December
Bronze	Zakiah Adnan	Karate – Kumite	Women's –68kg	13 December
Bronze	Lim Kok Leong; Moh Keen Hoo; Thor Chuan Leong	Snooker	Men's Team	13 December
Bronze	Bronica Song Kai Yin; Tan Kim Mei	Snooker – 6-Red Snooker	Women's Team	13 December
Bronze	Darrshan Suresh Kumar; Imran Daniel Abd Hazli; Koay Hao Sheng; Mitsuki Leong Wei Kang; Naufal Siddiq Kamaruzzaman	Tennis	Men's Team	13 December
Bronze	Daania Daniella Abd Hazli; Hannah Yip Seen Ean; Lim Zan Ning; Shihomi Leong Li Xuan; Sharifah Elsa Wan Abdul Rahman	Tennis	Women's Team	13 December
Bronze	Azmilaan Shahul Hameed	Teqball	Men's Singles	13 December
Bronze	Muhammad Eizlan Rakhli Abd Rahman; Muhammad Faris Farizal Zukeri	Teqball	Men's Doubles	13 December
Bronze	Nur Natasha Amyra Fazil	Teqball	Women's Singles	13 December
Bronze	Nur Batrisyia Afrina Iskandar; Nur Natasha Amyra Fazil	Teqball	Women's Doubles	13 December
Bronze	Nur Hidayat Ar Rasyid Ahmad Daud; Nurul Syafiqah Jafri	Teqball	Mixed Doubles	13 December
Bronze	Amsyar Sirhan Sifullah Saharrudin; Azhar Abdul Wahab; Azizan Zainol; Hasfizal Samad; Muhammad Nor Aidil Jasni; Suhaimi Ahmad	Woodball	Men's Stroke Team	13 December
Bronze	Asmawana Aziz; Nur Atrisha Shiffa Azizan; Nur Laili Idani Rosli; Putri Maisara Khairul Nizat; Qistina Mohd Reffal; Salbiah Hashim	Woodball	Women's Stroke Team	13 December
Bronze	Arvin Shaun Singh Chahal; Khiew Hoe Yean; Lim Yin Chuen; Terence Ng Shin Jian	Aquatics – Swimming	Men's 4 × 100m Freestyle Relay	14 December
Bronze	Hoh Shou Wei	Badminton	Men's Singles	14 December
Bronze	Leong Jun Hao	Badminton	Men's Singles	14 December
Bronze	Man Wei Chong; Tee Kai Wun	Badminton	Men's Doubles	14 December
Bronze	Wong Ling Ching	Badminton	Women's Singles	14 December
Bronze	Chen Tang Jie; Toh Ee Wei	Badminton	Mixed Doubles	14 December
Bronze	Aiman Mustafa Albakri; Kunaalan Segar; Ng Guan Peng; Sin Zhi Cheng; Benncaawan Suwanmanie Samran; Elsa Chew; Iiman Iklil Dzul Karnain; Nurin Liana Mohd Zan	Baseball – 5	Mixed Team	14 December
Bronze	Muhammad Syazirol Shamsudin	Bowling	Men's Singles	14 December
Bronze	Amira Syahirah Mohd Zulkefli; Diani Lee Cheng Ni; Megan Ding Min Ern; Quek Sue Yian	Equestrian – Dressage	Team	14 December
Bronze	Devinthirakumaar Vijayan Kumaran; Dhaanushruban Raveechandran; Gajenthiran Ganesan; Kugan Letchumanan; Madhava Rao Rama Naidu; Megarajaan Maran; Nantha Kanesan; Navinessh Ragunathen; Prithiswaran Kaliyappan; Saikabenesh Sai Baba; Sarmah Vishnu Selva Ganapathy; Suresh Leong Kim Seng; Tharveen Mahesan; Thinesh Raaj Gopalan; Viknesshwaran Gunaseelan	Kabaddi	Men's Standard Style	14 December
Bronze	Amutha Nithyanandam; Ananthi Muniandy; Bramakumari Mani; Darsini Jagjit Singh; Dharshini Ravee; Lynessa Mary William Franklin; Mavithra Ramakrishnan; Nanthini Krishnan; Nurfalah Zulhijjah Norolashikin; Shakthi Shre Visvalingam; Sivashangkari Hariselvam; Thevatharshini Poobalan; Uchira Nambiar Prem Kumar	Kabaddi	Women's Standard Style	14 December
Bronze	Geerijaieswaran Sivanesan; Leidaneswaran Asaithamby; Logen Vijaya Kumar; Prem Kumar Selvam; Shiv Ram Prakash; Sureeya Sankar Hari Sankar; Thevendran Kaliana Sundram	Karate – Kumite	Men's Team	14 December
Bronze	Adeola Fay Robert; Madhuri Poovanesan; Mirza Amirah Syuhada Mohd Faizal; Shahmalarani Chandran	Karate – Kumite	Women's Team	14 December
Bronze	Muhammad Yaasin Syahrizan	Sailing – Dinghy	Boy's Optimist	14 December
Bronze	Lydia Hannah Jasmine Lukman	Sailing – Dinghy	Girl's Optimist	14 December
Bronze	Nurul Syasya Nadiah Mohd Arifin	Shooting – Pistol & Rifle	Women's 10m Air Pistol	14 December
Bronze	Dina Batrisyia Adi Zahar; Joseline Cheah Lee Yean; Nurul Syasya Nadiah Mohd Arifin	Shooting – Pistol & Rifle	Women's 10m Air Pistol Team	14 December
Bronze	Benjamin Khor Cheng Jie; Khor Seng Chye; Nicholas Newell Bateman; Wong Boon Kiat	Shooting – Shotgun	Men's Sporting Clay Team	14 December
Bronze	Choong Javen; Danny Ng Wann Sing; Im Jin Zhen; Wong Qi Shen; Tey Hong Yu	Table Tennis	Men's Team	14 December
Bronze	Alice Chang Li Sian; Ho Ying; Im Li Ying; Karen Lyne Dick; Tee Ai Xin	Table Tennis	Women's Team	14 December
Bronze	Clement Ting Su Wei	Wushu – Taolu	Men's Changquan & Daoshu–Gunshu	14 December
Bronze	Sydney Chin Sy Xuan	Wushu – Taolu	Women's Taijiquan–Taijijian	14 December
Bronze	Wan Muhammad Fazri Wan Zahari	Athletics	Men's 800m	15 December
Bronze	Khairul Amirul Zamrulhisham; Mohammad Muqri Arif Mohamad Sapiny; Syed Afiq Fakhri Syed Ali	Petanque	Men's Triples	15 December
Bronze	Jasnina Jasmine Johan Johnson; Nur Durratul Sahira Yazit; Thadis Henhera Vennice	Petanque	Women's Triples	15 December
Bronze	Johnathan Wong Guanjie; Joseline Cheah Lee Yean	Shooting – Pistol & Rifle	Mixed 10m Air Pistol Team	15 December
Bronze	Missy Jaafar	Shooting – Practical	Women's Production	15 December
Bronze	Bronica Song Kai Yin	Snooker – 6-Red Snooker	Women's Singles	15 December
Bronze	Tan Kim Mei	Snooker – 6-Red Snooker	Women's Singles	15 December
Bronze	Bryan Ti Kai Jie	Wushu – Taolu	Men's Nanquan–Nandao–Nangun	15 December
Bronze	Muhammad Danish Aizad Mohd Firdaus Chua; Si Shin Peng; Wong Zi Hong	Wushu – Taolu	Men's Duilian Bare–Handed	15 December
Bronze	Felicity Wong Xin Nee	Wushu – Sanda	Women's –56kg	15 December
Bronze	Kan Ee Hann; Nicholas Long Seh Kit; Ng Wen May; Teo Sze Hui	Aquathlon	Mixed Team Relay	16 December
Bronze	Norliyana Kamaruddin	Athletics	Women's High Jump	16 December
Bronze	Tsen Fan Yew; Tun Ameerul Luqman Al Hakim Tun Hasnul Azam	Bowling	Men's Doubles	16 December
Bronze	Mohamad Nur Aiman Mohd Zariff; Muhammad Syawal Mazlin; Muhammad Zawawi Azman; Nur Amirull Fakhruddin Mazuki; Tsen Ren Bao	Cycling – Road	Men's Team Road Race	16 December
Bronze	Ng Joe Ee	Gymnastics – Rhythmic	Women's Individual All-Around	16 December
Bronze	Devinthirakumaar Vijayan Kumaran; Gajenthiran Ganesan; Kugan Letchumanan; Madhava Rao Rama Naidu; Megarajaan Maran; Navinessh Ragunathen; Saikabenesh Sai Baba; Sarmah Vishnu Selva Ganapathy; Thinesh Raaj Gopalan	Kabaddi	Men's Super 5	16 December
Bronze	Amutha Nithyanandam; Bramakumari Mani; Dharshini Ravee; Lynessa Mary William Franklin; Nurfalah Zulhijjah Norolashikin; Shakthi Shre Visvalingam; Thevatharshini Poobalan	Kabaddi	Women's Super 5	16 December
Bronze	Ooi Kheng Xing	Kickboxing – Kick Light	Men's –57kg	16 December
Bronze	Kueggen Vijayakumar	Kickboxing – Point Fighting	Men's –63kg	16 December
Bronze	Yong Rui Jie	Aquatics – Diving	Men's 1m Springboard	17 December
Bronze	Muhamad Zarif Syahiir Zolkepeli; Muhammad Syafiq Busthamin; Quik Chern Xin	Archery – Recurve	Mixed Team	17 December
Bronze	Adania Mohd Rezwan; Nur Hazirah Ramli	Bowling	Women's Doubles	17 December
Bronze	Asyraf Danial Abdul Latif	Muay Thai – Waikru	Men's Individual	17 December
Bronze	Ammarul Shafiq Ubaidillah	Muay Thai	Men's –75kg	17 December
Bronze	Damia Husna Azian	Muay Thai	Women's –45kg	17 December
Bronze	Nurul Rasyidah Suratman	Muay Thai	Women's –60kg	17 December
Bronze	Muhammad Robial Sobri	Pencak Silat – Tanding	Men's –90kg	17 December
Bronze	Muhammad Izzuddin Abdul Rani	Sailing – Windsurfer	Men's Techno 293 Plus	17 December
Bronze	Alia Sazana Azahari	Shooting – Pistol & Rifle	Women's 25m Air Pistol	17 December
Bronze	Thor Chuan Leong	Snooker	Men's Singles	17 December
Bronze	Karen Lyne Dick; Tee Ai Xin	Table tennis	Women's Doubles	17 December
Bronze	Choong Javen; Karen Lyne Dick	Table tennis	Mixed Doubles	17 December
Bronze	Isaac Tan Zhen Wei; Yap Qi Yi; Esther Joy Chen Hong Li; Sara Joy Chen Hong Mae	Triathlon	Mixed Team Relay	17 December
Bronze	Muhammad Farris Haikal Kamarul	Weightlifting	Men's +94kg	17 December
Bronze	Siti Aqilah Farhana Draman	Weightlifting	Women's +77kg	17 December
Bronze	Ng Sui Kim	Archery – Compound	Women's Individual	18 December
Bronze	Gavin Sim Wee Hon; Martyn Lim Wen Xuan; Shinozuka Rikigoro	Duathlon	Men's Team Relay	18 December
Bronze	Abdul Rahman Daud; Ahmad Aysar Hadi Mohd Shapri; Ahmad Haziq Kutty Abba; Ariff Safwan Mohd Safri; Danish Hakimi Sahaludin; Fergus Tierney; Mohammad Haykal Danish Mohd Haizon; Moses Raj Michel Dass; Muhamad Faris Danish Mohd Asrul; Muhammad Abu Khalil; Muhammad Aiman Hakimi Othman; Muhammad Aiman Yusuf Muhammad Nabil; Muhammad Alif Ahmad; Muhammad Aliff Izwan Yuslan; Muhammad Haqimi Azim Rosli; Muhammad Haziq Mukriz Mohamed Hasemuddin; Muhammad Shafizan Mohamad Arshad; Muhammad Ubaidullah Shamsul Fazili; Muhammad Zachary Zahidadil; Rohisham Haiqal Hashim; Syahmi Adib Haikal Mohd Shukri; Ziad El Basheer Norhisham; Zulhilmi Sharani	Football	Men's Team	18 December
Bronze	Muhammad Rafiq Ismail; Muhammad Syazirol Shamsudin; Tsen Fan Yew; Tun Ameerul Luqman Al Hakim Tun Hasnul Azam	Bowling	Men's Team	19 December
Bronze	Mohamad Rizal Wahidi	Boxing	Men's –54kg	19 December
Bronze	Muhammad Rasdenal Haikal	Boxing	Men's –57kg	19 December
Bronze	Puteri Munajjah Az Zahraa Azhar; Tan Li Ting	Chess	Women's Rapid Doubles	19 December
Bronze	Ahmad Harith Naim Mohd Nasir; Mahadir Harahap Khairuddin; Mohamad Awalluddin Mat Nawi; Mohamad Danial Abdul Dain; Mohd Firdaus Ambiah; Mohd Khairul Effendy Mohd Bahrin; Mohd Ridzwan Bakri; Muhammad Ekmal Shahrin; Muhammad Faris Haji Mohd Johan; Muhammad Saad Abdul Sani; Muhammad Syaifuddin Syukri Ibrahim Lincoln; Muhammad Syawal Sabaruddin; Syahir Iqbal Khan Akbar Khan; Syed Shahrul Niezam Syed Abd Rahim	Futsal	Men's Team	19 December
Bronze	Alice Chang Li Sian	Table Tennis	Women's Singles	19 December
Bronze	Mitsuki Leong Wei Kang	Tennis	Men's Singles	19 December

== Athletics ==
=== Track & road events ===
Men

Athlete	Event	Heats		Final	
Athlete	Event	Time	Rank	Time	Rank
Danish Iftikhar Roslee	100 m	10.18	1 Q	10.26	3rd place, bronze medalist(s)
Jonathan Nyepa	100 m	10.48	3 q	10.52	6
Danish Iftikhar Roslee	200 m	20.86	2 Q	20.73	3rd place, bronze medalist(s)
Pengiran Aidil Hajam	200 m	21.28	4	21.47	7
Umar Osman	400 m	47.08	3 Q	47.13	5
Muhammad Khalil Helmi	400 m	47.60	3 Q	DNF	
Wan Muhammad Fazri	800 m	1:53.39	1 Q	1:49.85	3rd place, bronze medalist(s)
Umar Osman	800 m	1:51.65	3 Q	1:50.19	4
Kristian Shao Zu Tung	5000 m	—N/a		14:53.96	5
Sanjay Manimaran	10000 m	—N/a		32:02.31	10
Kristian Shao Zu Tung	10000 m	—N/a		31:30.55	6
Mohamad Armin Zahryl	110 m hurdles	—N/a		13.85	3rd place, bronze medalist(s)
Mohd Rizzua Haizad	110 m hurdles	—N/a		14.39	6
Aiman Najmi Anuar	400 m hurdles	—N/a		53.14	5
Fakrul Afizul Nasir	400 m hurdles	—N/a		53.92	6
Khairul Hafiz Jantan; Danish Iftikhar Roslee; Jonathan Nyepa; Aliff Iman Mohd Fahimi; Pengiran Aidil Hajam	4x100 m relay	—N/a		39.03 NR	2nd place, silver medalist(s)
Umar Osman; Muhammad Khalil Helmi; Abdul Wafiy Roslan; Shafiq Fikri Shafiee; Kanishkann Nathan; Aiman Najmi Anuar	4x400 m relay	—N/a		3:11.07	5
Jing Hong Khor	20 km walk	—N/a		DSQ	
Ni Jia Yeow	Marathon	—N/a		2:42:50	7

Women

Athlete	Event	Heats		Final	
Athlete	Event	Time	Rank	Time	Rank
Zaidatul Husniah Zulkifli	100 m	11.74	5 q	11.87	7
Nur Aishah Rofina Aling	100 m	11.80	5	Did not advance	
Afrina Batrisyia Rizal	200 m	24.38	4 q	24.52	6
Wardatul Huwaida Mohd Hamka	200 m	24.72	5	Did not advance	
Mandy Goh Li	400 m hurdles	—N/a		61.65	5
Zaidatul Husniah Zulkifli; Nor Aishah Rofina Aling; Afrina Batrisyia Rizal; Wardatul Huwaida Mohd Hamka; Shereen Samson Vallabouy	4x100 m relay	—N/a		DNS	
Chelsea Cassiopea Evali Bopulas; Nurin Aira Rusdi; Mandy Goh Li; Shereen Samson Vallabouy; Shayna Marianne Pereira Jesindran	4x400 m relay	—N/a		DNS	

Mixed

Athlete	Event	Final	
Athlete	Event	Time	Rank
Umar Osman; Shafiq Fikri Shafiee; Muhammad Khalil Helmi; Chelsea Cassiopea Evali Bopulas; Shereen Samson Vallabouy; Mandy Goh Li	4x400 m relay	DNS	

=== Field events ===
Men

Athlete	Event	Final	
Athlete	Event	Distance (m)	Rank
Andre Anura	Long jump	7.71	1st place, gold medalist(s)
Zhi Hang Tan	Long jump	7.38	6
Andre Anura	Triple jump	16.29	2nd place, silver medalist(s)
Brendon Li King Ting	Triple jump	15.02	10
Eizlan Dahalan	High jump	2.09	7
Farrell Glenn Felix Jurus	High jump	2.09	6
Naufal Shahrul Afzam	Pole vault	NM	
Jonah Chang Rigan	Shot put	18.78	1st place, gold medalist(s)
Irfan Shamsuddin	Discus throw	60.23 GR	1st place, gold medalist(s)
Jonah Chang Rigan	Discus throw	50.63	4
Elrick Roslee	Javelin throw	66.45	4
Sadat Marzuki Ajisan	Hammer throw	60.15	2nd place, silver medalist(s)
Jackie Wong Siew Cheer	Hammer throw	59.81	3rd place, bronze medalist(s)

Women

Athlete	Event	Final	
Athlete	Event	Distance (m)	Rank
Nurul Ashikin Abas	Long jump	5.84	7
Alia Batrisya Nasaruddin	Long jump	5.54	10
Nurul Ashikin Abas	Triple jump	12.67	6
Norliyana Kamaruddin	High jump	1.75	3rd place, bronze medalist(s)
Nor Sarah Adi	Pole vault	3.60	6
Nani Sahirah Maryata	Shot put	16.36 NR	1st place, gold medalist(s)
Queenie Ting Kung Ni	Discus throw	51.81	2nd place, silver medalist(s)
Nur Atiqah Sufiah Hanizam	Discus throw	46.38	4
Ng Jing Xuan	Javelin throw	52.17	2nd place, silver medalist(s)
Grace Wong Xiu Mei	Hammer throw	65.41 GR, NR	1st place, gold medalist(s)
Nurul Hidayah Lukman	Hammer throw	52.21	5

=== Decathlon/Heptathlon ===
Athlete	Event	Final	
Athlete	Event	Points	Rank
Wilson Quaik Zhe Han	Decathlon	6136	5

== Badminton ==
The Badminton Association of Malaysia has listed 20 players to compete.

Men

Player	Event	Round of 16	Quarter-finals	Semi-finals	Final	Rank
Player	Event	Opponent Score	Opponent Score	Opponent Score	Opponent Score	Rank
Justin Hoh	Singles	J.Teh (SGP); W (22–20, 21–15)	K. Wangcharoen (THA); W (21-15,21-17)	A. Farhan (INA); L (10–21, 21–15, 14–21)	Failed to advance	3rd place, bronze medalist(s)
Leong Jun Hao	Singles	V. Phichith (LAO); W (21–15, 21–15)	P. Teeraratsakul (THA); W (21-18,21-16)	Z. Ubaidillah (INA); L (18–21, 13–21)	Failed to advance	3rd place, bronze medalist(s)
Aaron Chia; Soh Wooi Yik	Doubles	Bye	S. Jomkoh / K. Kedren (THA); W (21–16, 21–16)	L. Carnado / B. Maulana (INA); W (21–10, 21–12)	S. Gutama / M. Isfahani (INA); L (14–21, 17–21)	2nd place, silver medalist(s)
Man Wei Chong; Tee Kai Wun	Doubles	Bye	P. Sukphun / P. Teeraratsakul (THA); W (21-16,21-19)	S. Gutama / M. Isfahani (INA); L (16–21, 17–21)	Failed to advanced	3rd place, bronze medalist(s)
Leong Jun Hao; Aidil Sholeh; Aaron Chia; Justin Hoh; Man Wei Chong; Soh Wooi Yik; Tee Kai Wun; Eogene Ewe; Chen Tang Jie; Hoo Pang Ron	Team	—N/a	Philippines (PHI); W 3–0	Thailand (THA); W 3–1	Indonesia (INA); L 0–3	2nd place, silver medalist(s)

Women

Player	Event	Round of 16	Quarter-finals	Semi-finals	Final	Rank
Player	Event	Opponent Score	Opponent Score	Opponent Score	Opponent Score	Rank
Letshanaa Karupathevan	Singles	J. Hooi (SGP); W (21–17, 22–20)	P. Wardani (INA); L (18–21, 13–21)	Failed to advance		
Wong Ling Ching	Singles	I. Khan (SGP); W (21–16, 21–15)	N. Pratiwi (INA); W (21–11, 21–17)	R. Intanon (THA); L (11-21,21-18,17-21)	Failed to advance	3rd place, bronze medalist(s)
Pearly Tan; Thinaah Muralitharan	Doubles	Bye	B. Aimsaard / S. Taerattanachai (THA); W (21–11, 21–14)	R. Rose / F. Setianingrum (INA); W (21–14, 19–21, 21–16)	F. Kusuma / M. Sari (INA); W (21-16, 19–21, 21–17)	1st place, gold medalist(s)
Go Pei Kee; Teoh Mei Xing	Doubles	Bye	F. Kusuma / M. Sari (INA); L (15-21,12-21)	Failed to advanced		
Letshanaa Karupathevan; Cheng Su Yin; Eng Ler Qi; Go Pei Kee; Siti Zulaikha Muhammad Azmi; Thinaah Muralitharan; Pearly Tan; Teoh Mei Xing; Toh Ee Wei; Wong Ling Ching	Team	—N/a	Vietnam (VIE); W 3–1	Indonesia (INA); L 2–3	—N/a	3rd place, bronze medalist(s)

Mixed

Player	Round of 16	Quarter-finals	Semi-finals	Final	Rank
Player	Opponent Score	Opponent Score	Opponent Score	Opponent Score	Rank
Chen Tang Jie; Toh Ee Wei	Bye	T. Hee / J. Yujia (SGP); W (21–12, 21–14)	R. Oupthong / J. Sudjaipraparat (THA); L (15–21, 16–21)	Failed to advanced	3rd place, bronze medalist(s)
Hoo Pang Ron; Cheng Su Yin	S. Padiz / M. Untal (PHI); W (21–8, 21–14)	D. Puavaranukroh / S. Paewsampran (THA); L (12–21, 15–21)	Failed to advanced		

== Baseball ==
Team	Event	Round-robin							Final / BM	
Team	Event	Opposition Score	Opposition Score	Opposition Score	Opposition Score	Opposition Score	Opposition Score	Rank	Opposition Score	Rank
Malaysia	Men's tournament	Indonesia; L 0–10	Vietnam; L 2–5	Philippines; L 21–0	Laos; L 5–9	Singapore; L 7–14	Thailand; L 3–17	6	Did not advance	
Malaysia	Baseball5	Indonesia; L 8–10	Thailand; L 27–21	Vietnam; W 23–0	—N/a			3 q	Vietnam; W 13–3	3rd place, bronze medalist(s)

=== Men's tournament ===
Pos	Team	Pld	W	L	RF	RA	RD	PCT	GB	Qualification
1	Philippines	6	6	0	93	11	+82	1.000	—	Gold medal match
2	Thailand (H)	6	5	1	68	17	+51	.833	1	Gold medal match
3	Indonesia	6	4	2	49	50	−1	.667	2	Bronze medal match
4	Singapore	6	3	3	57	58	−1	.500	3	Bronze medal match
5	Laos	6	2	4	30	46	−16	.333	4	
6	Vietnam	6	1	5	18	74	−56	.167	5	
7	Malaysia	6	0	6	17	76	−59	.000	6	

Source: WBSC
(H) Hosts

5 December; 10:20 (UTC+9)	Indonesia	10–0	Malaysia	Sirikit Main Baseball Stadium, Pathum Thani
5 December; 10:20 (UTC+9)		Boxscore		Sirikit Main Baseball Stadium, Pathum Thani

6 December; 10:00 (UTC+9)	Malaysia	2–5	Vietnam	Sirikit Secondary Baseball Stadium, Pathum Thani
6 December; 10:00 (UTC+9)		Boxscore		Sirikit Secondary Baseball Stadium, Pathum Thani

8 December; 14:00 (UTC+9)	Philippines	21–0	Malaysia	Sirikit Main Baseball Stadium, Pathum Thani
8 December; 14:00 (UTC+9)		Boxscore		Sirikit Main Baseball Stadium, Pathum Thani

9 December; 10:00 (UTC+9)	Laos	9-5	Malaysia	Sirikit Secondary Baseball Stadium, Pathum Thani
9 December; 10:00 (UTC+9)		Boxscore		Sirikit Secondary Baseball Stadium, Pathum Thani

10 December; 9:30 (UTC+9)	Malaysia	7–14	Singapore	Sirikit Main Baseball Stadium, Pathum Thani
10 December; 9:30 (UTC+9)		Boxscore		Sirikit Main Baseball Stadium, Pathum Thani

11 December; 14:00 (UTC+9)	Malaysia	7–13	Thailand	Sirikit Main Baseball Stadium, Pathum Thani
11 December; 14:00 (UTC+9)		Boxscore		Sirikit Main Baseball Stadium, Pathum Thani

=== Baseball5 ===
Pos	Team	Pld	W	L	RF	RA	RD	PCT	GB	Qualification
1	Thailand (H)	3	3	0	84	26	+58	1.000	—	Gold medal match
2	Indonesia	3	2	1	34	33	+1	.667	1	Gold medal match
3	Malaysia	3	1	2	52	37	+15	.333	2	Bronze medal match
4	Vietnam	3	0	3	2	76	−74	.000	3	Bronze medal match

Source: WBSC
(H) Hosts

11 December; 10:00 (UTC+9)	Malaysia	8–10	Indonesia	Indoor Stadium Huamark, Bangkok
11 December; 10:00 (UTC+9)		Boxscore		Indoor Stadium Huamark, Bangkok

12 December; 10:00 (UTC+9)	Thailand	27–21	Malaysia	Indoor Stadium Huamark, Bangkok
12 December; 10:00 (UTC+9)		Boxscore		Indoor Stadium Huamark, Bangkok

13 December; 12:00 (UTC+9)	Malaysia	23–0	Vietnam	Indoor Stadium Huamark, Bangkok
13 December; 12:00 (UTC+9)		Boxscore		Indoor Stadium Huamark, Bangkok

Bronze medal match

14 December; 10:00 (UTC+9)	Malaysia	13–3	Vietnam	Indoor Stadium Huamark, Bangkok
14 December; 10:00 (UTC+9)		Boxscore		Indoor Stadium Huamark, Bangkok

== Basketball ==
=== 5x5 Basketball ===
Team	Event	Group stage			Quarterfinals	Semifinals	Final / BM	
Team	Event	Opposition Score	Opposition Score	Rank	Opposition Score	Opposition Score	Opposition Score	Rank
Malaysia men's	Men's	Vietnam; W 89–63	Philippines; L 58–83	2 Q	Singapore; W 71–69	Thailand; L 55–86	Indonesia; L 68–80	4
Malaysia women's	Women's	Philippines; L 67–76	Singapore; W 70-34	2 Q	Vietnam; W 83–44	Thailand; L 51–59	Indonesia; L 55–62	4

=== 3x3 Basketball ===
Team	Event	Group Stage				Semifinals	Final / BM	
Team	Event	Opposition Score	Opposition Score	Opposition Score	Rank	Opposition Score	Opposition Score	Rank
Anthony Liew Wen Qian; Ting Chun Hong; Ooi Xian Fu; Chang Zi Fueng	Men's	Laos; W 21–5	Philippines; L 19–21	Vietnam; W 21–12	2 Q	Thailand; L 11–21	Philippines; W 21–19	3rd place, bronze medalist(s)
Foo Suet Ying; Tan Sin Jie; Tan Pei Jie; Tan Yin Jie	Women's	Indonesia; L 10–19	Philippines; W 21–19	—N/a	2 Q	Thailand; L 19–20	Vietnam; W 21–20	3rd place, bronze medalist(s)

== Cricket ==
Squads

Men	Women
Syed Aziz (c); Muhammad Haziq Aiman; Ainool Hafizs (wk); Muhammad Amir; Azri Azhar; Ahmad Faiz; Amir Khan; Aslam Khan; Sharvin Muniandy; Pavandeep Singh; Virandeep Singh; Muhamad Syahadat; Vijay Unni; Muhammad Wafiq; Zubaidi Zulkifle	Winifred Duraisingam (c); Ainur Amelina; Nur Arianna Natsya; Irdina Beh Nabil; Nur Dania Syuhada; Aisya Eleesa; Mas Elysa; Ainna Hamizah Hashim; Nazatul Hidayah Husna Binti Razali; Elsa Hunter; Mahirah Izzati Ismail; Nur Izzatul Syafiqa; Wan Julia (wk); Suabika Manivannan; Dhanusri Muhunan; Aina Najwa (wk); Musfirah Nur Ainaa; Amalin Sorfina

=== Men's tournament ===
Team	Event	Group Stage					Final / BM	
Team	Event	Opposition Score	Opposition Score	Opposition Score	Opposition Score	Rank	Opposition Score	Rank
Men's	T10	Philippines; W 84/6 (9.5 overs) – 83/7 (10 overs)	Singapore; W 74/3 (5.5 overs) – 73/8 (10 overs)	Thailand; W 59/1 (5.3 overs) – 57/7 (10 overs)	Indonesia; W 65/3 (8 overs) – 61/8 (10 overs)	1	—N/a	1st place, gold medalist(s)
Men's	T20	Philippines; W 201/9 (20 overs) – 87/9 (20 overs)	Indonesia; W 78/3 (9 overs) – 75/9 (20 overs)	Thailand; W 67/2 (5.4 overs) – 62/10 (13.3 overs)	Singapore; W 111/4 (11.4 overs) – 110/10 (19.3 overs)	1	—N/a	1st place, gold medalist(s)

=== Women's tournament ===
Team	Event	Group Stage			Semifinal	Final / BM	
Team	Event	Opposition Score	Opposition Score	Rank	Opposition Score	Opposition Score	Rank
Women's	T10	Philippines; W 93/5 (10 overs) – 67/7 (10 overs)	Myanmar; L 65/10 (9.1 overs) – 66/6 (9.5 overs)	2 Q	Thailand; L 31/6 (6 overs) – 82/2 (6 overs)	Myanmar; W 74/5 (10 overs) – 47/6 (10 overs)	3rd place, bronze medalist(s)
Women's	T20	Indonesia; W 128/7 (20 overs) – 110/9 (20 overs)	Philippines; W 63/2 (8.2 overs) – 62/9 (20 overs)	1 Q	Myanmar; W 154/4 (20 overs) – 65/5 (15.2 overs)	Thailand; L 58/8 (20 overs) – 59/3 (9.5 overs)	2nd place, silver medalist(s)

== Football ==
Summary

Key:

- A.E.T – After extra time.
- P – Match decided by penalty-shootout.

Team	Event	Group Stage				Semifinal	Final / BM	
Team	Event	Opposition Score	Opposition Score	Opposition Score	Rank	Opposition Score	Opposition Score	Rank
Malaysia men's	Men's tournament	Laos; W 4–1	Vietnam; L 0–2	—N/a	2 Q	Thailand; L 0–1	Philippines; W 2-1	3rd place, bronze medalist(s)
Malaysia women's	Women's tournament	Vietnam; L 0–7	Myanmar; L 0–3	Philippines; L 0–6	4	Did not advance		7

=== Men's tournament ===
Team roster

Malaysia announced their 25-men preliminary squad on 21 November 2025. The final squad was announced on 3 December.

Head coach: Nafuzi Zain

No.	Pos.	Player	Date of birth (age)	Club
1	GK	Syahmi Adib Haikal	30 March 2003 (aged 22)	(Football Association of Malaysia) Negeri Sembilan
2	DF	Aiman Hakimi	28 January 2005 (aged 20)	(Football Association of Malaysia) Selangor
3	DF	Ubaidullah Shamsul	30 November 2003 (aged 22)	(Football Association of Malaysia) Terengganu
4	DF	Alif Ahmad	2 January 2003 (aged 22)	(Football Association of Malaysia) Johor Darul Ta'zim
5	DF	Shafizan Arshad	15 August 2005 (aged 20)	(Football Association of Malaysia) Johor Darul Ta'zim
6	MF	Danish Hakimi	{6 January 2005 (aged 20)	(Football Association of Malaysia) Johor Darul Ta'zim
7	FW	Haqimi Azim	6 January 2003 (aged 22)	(Football Association of Malaysia) Kuala Lumpur City
8	MF	Muhammad Abu Khalil	11 April 2005 (aged 20)	(Football Association of Malaysia) Selangor
9	FW	Abdul Rahman Daud	4 December 2004 (aged 20)	(Football Association of Malaysia) Selangor
10	MF	Haykal Danish	5 May 2005 (aged 20)	(Football Association of Malaysia) Selangor
11	FW	Aliff Izwan	10 February 2004 (aged 21)	(Football Association of Malaysia) Selangor
12	MF	Ziad El Basheer	24 December 2003 (aged 21)	(Football Association of Malaysia) Johor Darul Ta'zim
13	DF	Aysar Hadi	4 September 2003 (aged 22)	(Football Association of Malaysia) Johor Darul Ta'zim
14	MF	Haziq Kutty Abba	28 September 2004 (aged 21)	(Football Association of Malaysia) Penang
15	FW	Fergus Tierney	19 March 2003 (aged 22)	(Football Association of Malaysia) Sabah
16	GK	Zulhilmi Sharani	{4 May 2004 (aged 21)	(Football Association of Malaysia) Johor Darul Ta'zim
17	FW	Rohisham Haiqal	24 October 2005 (aged 20)	(Football Association of Malaysia) Selangor
18	DF	Faris Danish	4 July 2006 (aged 19)	(Football Association of Malaysia) Johor Darul Ta'zim
19	DF	Aiman Yusuf	6 March 2006 (aged 19)	(Football Association of Malaysia) Selangor
20	DF	Zachary Zahidadil	27 May 2005 (aged 20)	(Football Association of Malaysia) Terengganu
21	DF	Ariff Safwan	17 February 2005 (aged 20)	(Football Association of Malaysia) Johor Darul Ta'zim
22	DF	Moses Raj	10 August 2005 (aged 20)	(Football Association of Malaysia) Selangor
23	GK	Haziq Mukriz	19 April 2003 (aged 22)	(Football Association of Malaysia) UM-Damansara United

Group play

Pos	Team	Pld	W	D	L	GF	GA	GD	Pts	Qualification
1	Vietnam	2	2	0	0	4	1	+3	6	Advance to knockout stage
2	Malaysia	2	1	0	1	4	3	+1	3	Advance to knockout stage
3	Laos	2	0	0	2	2	6	−4	0	

Source: Soccerway
Rules for classification: Group stage tiebreakers
6 December 2025
16:00

Malaysia	4–1	Laos
Haykal 33'; Haqimi 59'; Moses 62'; Muhammad 90'	Report	Bounphaeng 4'

Rajamangala Stadium, Bangkok
Referee: Payam Heydari (Iran)
11 December 2025
16:00

Vietnam	2–0	Malaysia
Nguyễn Hiểu Minh 11'; Phạm Minh Phúc 22'	Report

Rajamangala Stadium, Bangkok
Referee: Qasim Al-Hatmi (Oman)

=== Women's tournament ===
Team roster

The following players were finalised for the 2025 SEA Games in Chonburi, Thailand.

Head coach: (Brazil) Joel Cornelli

No.	Pos.	Player	Date of birth (age)	Caps	Goals	Club
23	GK	Nurul Azurin Mazlan	27 January 2000 (aged 25)	50	0	(Football Association of Malaysia) Sabah
1	GK	Nur Ezza Ashikin Abdul Razak	18 April 2003 (aged 22)	6	0	(Football Association of Malaysia) Selangor
18	DF	Nur Amirah Abdul Rahman	21 November 2004 (aged 21)	10	0	(Football Association of Malaysia) Selangor
3	DF	Eusvewana Kadius	25 May 2005 (aged 20)	14	0	(Football Association of Malaysia) Selangor
2	DF	Juliana Barek	4 January 2002 (aged 23)	15	1	(Football Association of Malaysia) Sabah
5	DF	Siti Nurfaizah Saidin	1 April 2002 (aged 23)	24	0	(Football Association of Malaysia) Sabah
4	DF	Nur Dhiyaa Addin Mohd Azhari	12 March 2006 (aged 19)	1	0	(Football Association of Malaysia) MBSJ
10	DF	Steffi Sarge Kaur (captain)	25 October 1988 (aged 37)	35	4	(Football Association of Malaysia) MBSJ
12	DF	Kanchenjeet Kaur Nanua	5 July 2006 (aged 19)	4	0	(United States Soccer Federation) Miami Dade College
16	DF	Tegen Su-Yin Butler	25 December 2008 (aged 16)	2	0	(United States Soccer Federation) Davenport Iowa
20	MF	Nurhadfina Mohd Firdaus	2 September 2004 (aged 21)	11	0	(Football Association of Malaysia) Selangor
8	MF	Nur Najwa Irdina Zaidi	26 September 2006 (aged 19)	9	1	(Football Association of Malaysia) Selangor
7	MF	Jaciah Jumilis	23 July 1991 (aged 34)	72	5	(Football Association of Malaysia) Sabah
6	MF	Haindee Mosroh	17 April 1993 (aged 32)	40	6	(Football Association of Malaysia) Sabah
17	MF	Nur Syafiqah Zainal Abidin	27 December 2001 (aged 23)	19	0	(Football Association of Malaysia) MBSJ
9	MF	Nur Lyana Soberi	18 June 1999 (aged 26)	30	0	(Football Association of Malaysia) Kelana United
21	FW	Henrietta Justine	19 August 2002 (aged 23)	19	1	(Football Association of Malaysia) Sabah
11	FW	Nur Adrienna Zamzaihiri	13 August 2004 (aged 21)	13	3	(Football Association of Malaysia) MBSJ
14	FW	Dian Aqilah Mohammed Imran	10 October 2007 (aged 18)	5	0	(Football Association of Malaysia) MBSJ
22	FW	Nur Ainsyah Murad	22 October 2003 (aged 22)	15	2	(Football Association of Malaysia) Selangor
15	FW	Intan Sarah	10 July 1999 (aged 26)	13	3	(Football Association of Malaysia) MBSJ
19	FW	Nur Laila Syamila A Rahim	7 June 2010 (aged 15)	0	0	(Football Association of Malaysia) Kuala Lumpur FA
13	FW	Nurfazira Muhammad Sani	13 November 2001 (aged 24)	16	2	(Football Association of Malaysia) Selangor

Group play

Pos	Team	Pld	W	D	L	GF	GA	GD	Pts	Qualification
1	Vietnam	3	2	0	1	9	1	+8	6	Advance to knockout stage
2	Philippines	3	2	0	1	8	2	+6	6	Advance to knockout stage
3	Myanmar	3	2	0	1	5	3	+2	6	
4	Malaysia	3	0	0	3	0	16	−16	0	

Source: Soccerway
5 December 2025
18:30

Vietnam	7–0	Malaysia
Phạm Hải Yến 4', 26'; Nguyễn Thị Bích Thùy 23'; Trần Thị Hải Linh 36'; Thái Thị Thảo 48', 59', 78'	Report

Chonburi Stadium, Chonburi
Referee: Rawdha Almansoori (United Arab Emirates)
8 December 2025
16:00

Malaysia	0–3	Myanmar
	Report	San Thaw Thaw 25'; May Htet Lu 35'; Win Theingi Tun 64'

IPE Chonburi Stadium, Chonburi
Referee: Alesar Baddour (Syria)
11 December 2025
16:00

Philippines	6–0	Malaysia
Pino 45', 53', 70' (pen.); Cowart 68'; Markey 85'; Castañeda 90+6'	Report

IPE Chonburi Stadium, Chonburi
Referee: Sunita Thongthawin (Thailand)

== Gymnastics ==
=== Artistic ===
Men

Athlete	Apparatus	Preliminary		Final	
Athlete	Apparatus	Score	Rank	Score	Rank
Muhammad Sharul Aimy	Floor exercise	12.700	6	Did not advance	
Luqman Al-Hafiz Zulfa	Floor exercise	12.467	7 Q	12.865	2nd place, silver medalist(s)
Muhammad Sharul Aimy	Pommel horse	10.200	5 Q	12.267	3rd place, bronze medalist(s)
Bariq Adif Mat Daud	Pommel horse	9.733	7	Did not advance	
Chun Chen Ng	Rings	12.300	6 Q	12.233	5
Bariq Adif Mat Daud	Rings	11.133	7	Did not advance	
Muhammad Sharul Aimy	Vault	13.933	1 Q	13.833	1st place, gold medalist(s)
Luqman Al-Hafiz Zulfa	Parallel bars	10.167	9	Did not advance	
Chun Chen Ng	Parallel bars	11.100	7 Q	11.233	5
Luqman Al-Hafiz Zulfa	Horizontal bar	11.800	4 Q	11.700	5
Bariq Adif Mat Daud	Horizontal bar	10.933	7	Did not advance	

Women

Athlete	Apparatus	Preliminary		Final	
Athlete	Apparatus	Score	Rank	Score	Rank
Yeap Kang Xian	Vault	12.900	3 Q	12.966	3rd place, bronze medalist(s)
Rachel Li Wen Yeoh	Uneven bars	13.650	1 Q	13.300	1st place, gold medalist(s)
Cadence Zi Qi Teh	Uneven bars	11.200	6	Did not advance	
Yeap Kang Xian	Balance beam	11.900	5 Q	13.233	1st place, gold medalist(s)
Cadence Zi Qi Teh	Balance beam	10.050	9	Did not advance	
Yeap Kang Xian	Floor exercise	12.300	5	Did not advance	
Cadence Zi Qi Teh	Floor exercise	10.900	9 Q	11.933	4

== Handball ==
Team	Event	Preliminary round						Semifinal	Final / BM	
Team	Event	Opposition Score	Opposition Score	Opposition Score	Opposition Score	Opposition Score	Rank	Opposition Score	Opposition Score	Rank
Malaysia	Men's tournament	Thailand; L 20–39	Philippines; L 23–24	Indonesia; L 21–27	Vietnam; L 28–33	Singapore; L 9–34	6	Did not advance		

== Hockey ==
=== Field hockey ===
Team	Event	Preliminary round					Semifinal	Final / BM	
Team	Event	Opposition Score	Opposition Score	Opposition Score	Opposition Score	Rank	Opposition Score	Opposition Score	Rank
Malaysia men's	Men's tournament	Myanmar; W 21–1	Indonesia; W 6–2	Singapore; W 6–0	Thailand; W 6–2	1 Q	Singapore; W 12–2	Thailand; W 8–0	1st place, gold medalist(s)
Malaysia women's	Women's tournament	Singapore; W 3–0	Indonesia; W 11–1	Thailand; T 1–1	—N/a	1 Q	Singapore; W 9–0	Indonesia; W 6–0	1st place, gold medalist(s)

=== Indoor hockey ===
Team	Event	Preliminary round					Semifinal	Final / BM	
Team	Event	Opposition Score	Opposition Score	Opposition Score	Opposition Score	Rank	Opposition Score	Opposition Score	Rank
Malaysia men's	Men's tournament	Philippines; W 13–0	Indonesia; W 5–4	Singapore; W 8–0	Thailand; W 6–4	1 Q	Singapore; W 6–0	Indonesia; L 4–4	2nd place, silver medalist(s)
Malaysia women's	Women's tournament	Singapore; W 10–0	Philippines; W 2–1	Indonesia; W 3–0	Thailand; L 0–2	2 Q	Indonesia; W 2–0	Thailand –	

=== Hockey5s ===
The Malaysian Hockey Federation released a list of 20 players to compete.

Team	Event	Preliminary round				Semifinal	Final / BM	
Team	Event	Opposition Score	Opposition Score	Opposition Score	Rank	Opposition Score	Opposition Score	Rank
Malaysia men's	Men's tournament	Indonesia; W 4–2	Philippines; W 18–0	Thailand; W 9–1	1 Q	Philippines; W 10–1	Indonesia; W 7–3	1st place, gold medalist(s)
Malaysia women's	Women's tournament	Indonesia; W 5–3	Philippines; W 13–0	Thailand; W 7–2	1 Q	Philippines; W 7–0	Thailand; L 1–7	2nd place, silver medalist(s)

==== Men's tournament ====
Pos	Team	Pld	W	D	L	GF	GA	GD	Pts	Qualification
1	Malaysia	3	3	0	0	31	3	+28	9	Semi-finals
2	Thailand (H)	3	2	0	1	16	10	+6	6	Semi-finals
3	Indonesia	3	1	0	2	18	8	+10	3	Semi-finals
4	Philippines	3	0	0	3	0	44	−44	0	Semi-finals

Updated to match(es) played on 7 December 2025. Source: FIH
Rules for classification: 1) points; 2) matches won; 3) goal difference; 4) goals for; 5) head-to-head result; 6) field goals for.
(H) Hosts

7 December 2025
11:00

Malaysia	4–2	Indonesia
	Report

7 December 2025
16:00

Malaysia	18–0	Philippines
	Report

8 December 2025
14:00

Malaysia	9–1	Thailand
	Report

Semi-finals

10 December 2025
09:00

Malaysia	10–1	Philippines
	Report

Gold medal match

10 December 2025
14:30

Malaysia	7–3	Indonesia
	Report

==== Women's tournament ====
All times are Indochina Time (UTC+07:00)

Pos	Team	Pld	W	D	L	GF	GA	GD	Pts	Qualification
1	Malaysia	3	3	0	0	25	5	+20	9	Semifinals
2	Thailand	3	2	0	1	17	9	+8	6	Semifinals
3	Indonesia	3	1	0	2	12	11	+1	3	Semifinals
4	Philippines	3	0	0	3	0	29	−29	0	Semifinals

Source: 2025 SEA Games
Rules for classification: 1) points; 2) matches won; 3) goal difference; 4) goals for; 5) head-to-head result; 6) field goals for.

7 December 2025
12:00

Indonesia	3–5	Malaysia
	Report

8 December 2025
11:00

Philippines	0–13	Malaysia
	Report

8 December 2025
15:00

Thailand	2–7	Malaysia
	Report

Semifinals

10 December 2025
11:00

Malaysia	7–0	Philippines
	Report

Gold medal match

10 December 2025
15:30

Malaysia	1–7	Thailand
	Report

== Kabaddi ==
Squads

Men	Women
Devinthirakumaar Vijayan Kumaran; Dhaanushruban Raveechandran; Gajenthiran Ganesan; Kugan Letchumanan; Madhava Rao Rama Naidu; Megarajaan Maran; Nantha Kanesan; Navinessh Ragunathen; Prithiswaran Kaliyappan; Saikabenesh Sai Baba; Sarmah Vishnu Selva Ganapathy; Suresh Leong Kim Seng; Tharveen Mahesan; Thinesh Raaj Gopalan; Viknesshwaran Gunaseelan	Amutha Nithyanandam; Ananthi Muniandy; Bramakumari Mani; Darsini Jagjit Singh; Dharshini Ravee; Lynessa Mary William Franklin; Mavithra Ramakrishnan; Nanthini Krishnan; Nurfalah Zulhijjah Norolashikin; Shakthi Shre Visvalingam; Sivashangkari Hariselvam; Thevatharshini Poobalan; Uchira Nambiar Prem Kumar

Team	Event	Preliminary round						Semifinal	Final	
Team	Event	Opposition Score	Opposition Score	Opposition Score	Opposition Score	Opposition Score	Rank	Opposition Score	Opposition Score	Rank
Malaysia	Men's Standard Style	Timor-Leste; W 85–9	Myanmar; W 54–31	Thailand; L 17–49	Singapore; W 66–26	Indonesia; L 24–49	—N/a			3rd place, bronze medalist(s)
Malaysia	Men's Super Five	Thailand; L 25–40	Singapore; W 38–24	Timor-Leste; W 43–13	Indonesia; L 29–33	Myanmar; W 35–22	—N/a			3rd place, bronze medalist(s)
Malaysia	Men's Three Stars	Thailand; D 23-23	Singapore; W 25-16	Indonesia; W 27-19	Timor-Leste; W 25-7	Myanmar; W 24-16	—N/a		Thailand; W 28-16	1st place, gold medalist(s)
Malaysia	Women's Standard Style	Timor-Leste; W 85–9	Indonesia; L 28-27	Singapore; W 73–14	Thailand; L 35-62	—N/a				3rd place, bronze medalist(s)
Malaysia	Women's Super Five	Indonesia; L 19-31	Singapore; W 38–12	Timor-Leste; W WO	Thailand; L 11–45	—N/a				3rd place, bronze medalist(s)
Malaysia	Women's Three Stars	Indonesia; W 23-22	Singapore; W 34-5	Thailand; L 19-20	Timor-Leste; W WO	—N/a			Indonesia; L 23-24	2nd place, silver medalist(s)

== Karate ==
Kumite

Athlete	Event	Preliminary	Quarterfinals	Semifinals	Final / BM	
Athlete	Event	Opposition Result	Opposition Result	Opposition Result	Opposition Result	Rank
Thevendran Sundram	Men's -55 kg	—N/a	Bye	Pg Hasimudin (BRU); W 11–2	C Văn Đức (VIE); W 4–0	1st place, gold medalist(s)
Geerijaeiswaran Sivanesan	Men's -60 kg	—N/a	A Da Silva (TLS); W 6–1	M Siwakon (THA); L 1–9	—N/a	3rd place, bronze medalist(s)
Sureeya Sankar Hari Sankar	Men's -67 kg	—N/a	F Bartolomeu (TLS); W 8–0	K Hai Nam (VIE); L 3–3	B Somphone (LAO); W 8–0	3rd place, bronze medalist(s)
Leidaneswaran Asaithamby	Men's -75 kg	—N/a	T Wei En (SGP); L 2–2	Did not advance		
Geerijaieswaran Sivanesan; Leidaneswaran Asaithamby; Thevendran Sundram; Shiv Ram Prakash; Prem Kumar Selvam; Logen Vijaya Kumar; Sureeya Sankar Hari Sankar	Men's team	—N/a	Vietnam; W 3–2	Indonesia; L 1–3	Philippines	3rd place, bronze medalist(s)
Shahmalarani Chandran	Women's -50 kg	—N/a	Bye	N Thi Thu (VIE); W 1–0	F Chi Htun (MYA); W 4–0	1st place, gold medalist(s)
Adeola Fay Robert	Women's -55 kg	—N/a	T Yu Aung (MYA); W 4–0	N Dieu Ly (VIE); L 0–6	S Agung (INA); W 6–5	3rd place, bronze medalist(s)
Madhuri Poovanesan	Women's -61 kg	G Dewangee (SGP); W 9–0	A Kartika (INA); L 5–14	Did not advance		
Zakiah Adnan	Women's -68 kg	—N/a	C Georgia (INA); L 3–7	—N/a		3rd place, bronze medalist(s)
Madhuri Poovanesan; Shahmalarani Chandran; Mirza Amirah Faizal; Adeola Fay Robert	Women's team	—N/a	Vietnam; L 0–2	—N/a		3rd place, bronze medalist(s)

== Netball ==
Team	Event	Round-robin					Final	
Team	Event	Opposition Score	Opposition Score	Opposition Score	Opposition Score	Rank	Opposition Score	Rank
Malaysia; Adalia Jasmine Mustazal; Ashwinii Kali Tass; Farwiza Mohd Fauzi; Haisya Maisara Abdul Qayyum; Nordiyanah Noorsabadinee; Nur Amisya Khairud Din; Nur Izzazrin Aizie Ahmad Yani; Nur Syafazliyana Mohd Ali; Nurfahira Abdul Razak; Nuriz Shazleen Amir Din; Siti Maisarah Affandi; Siti Nur Hidayatul Akhma Suhhaimi	Netball	Brunei; W 75-33	Philippines; W 52-40	Singapore; L 56-58	Thailand; W 65-52	2nd	Singapore; W 52-49	1st place, gold medalist(s)

== Polo ==
Malaysia will send a 9-man polo team to compete in the mixed 2–4 goals and 4–6 goals.

Team	Event	Preliminary Round				Semifinals	Final / BM	
Team	Event	Opposition Score	Opposition Score	Opposition Score	Rank	Opposition Score	Opposition Score	Rank
Tengku Muhammad Shah; Shahir Akmal Mohd Shah; Amran Selamat; Zulhelmi Nadzar; Edham Shaharuddin; Abdul Rashid Hasnan; Azfar Mustapha; Tengku Ahmad Shazril Ezzani; Ikwan Hafiz Jamaludin	Mixed 2–4 goals	Indonesia (INA); W 8 – 4	Brunei (BRU); W 6 – 5	—N/a	1 Q	Brunei (BRU); L 6 – 9	Philippines (PHI); W 7 – 3½	3rd place, bronze medalist(s)
Tengku Muhammad Shah; Shahir Akmal Mohd Shah; Amran Selamat; Zulhelmi Nadzar; Edham Shaharuddin; Abdul Rashid Hasnan; Azfar Mustapha; Tengku Ahmad Shazril Ezzani; Ikwan Hafiz Jamaludin	Mixed 4–6 goals	Indonesia (INA); W 12 – 7½	Thailand (THA); L 9½ – 7	Brunei (BRU) w 9 – 5½	2 Q	—N/a		

== Sepak takraw ==
Men's

Athlete	Event	Group stage					Semifinals	Final	
Athlete	Event	Opposition Score	Opposition Score	Opposition Score	Opposition Score	Rank	Opposition Score	Opposition Score	Rank
Farhan Adam; Mohamad Azlan Alias; Hafizul Hayazi Adnan; Haziq Hairul Nizam; Mohammad Syahir Rosdi; Noraizat Mohd Nordin; Zarif Marican Ibrahim Marican; Aidil Aiman Azwawi; Amirul Zazwan Amir; Zulkifli Abd Razak; Afifuddin Mohd Razali; Zuleffendi Sumari; Norfaizzul Abd Razak; Shahalril Aiman Halim; Fetri Mohd Azwadi	Regu	Laos; W 2-0	Vietnam; W 2-0	—N/a					
Farhan Adam; Mohamad Azlan Alias; Hafizul Hayazi Adnan; Haziq Hairul Nizam; Mohammad Syahir Rosdi; Noraizat Mohd Nordin; Zarif Marican Ibrahim Marican; Aidil Aiman Azwawi; Amirul Zazwan Amir; Zulkifli Abd Razak; Afifuddin Mohd Razali; Zuleffendi Sumari; Norfaizzul Abd Razak; Shahalril Aiman Halim; Fetri Mohd Azwadi	Team Regu	Singapore; W 3–0	Philippines; W 3–0	Myanmar; W 2–1	—N/a	1 Q	Indonesia; W 2–0	Thailand; W 2–1	1st place, gold medalist(s)
Farhan Adam; Mohamad Azlan Alias; Hafizul Hayazi Adnan; Haziq Hairul Nizam; Mohammad Syahir Rosdi; Noraizat Mohd Nordin; Zarif Marican Ibrahim Marican; Aidil Aiman Azwawi; Amirul Zazwan Amir; Zulkifli Abd Razak; Afifuddin Mohd Razali; Zuleffendi Sumari; Norfaizzul Abd Razak; Shahalril Aiman Halim; Fetri Mohd Azwadi	Quadrant	Singapore; W 2–0	Vietnam; L 0–2	Laos; L 0–2	Brunei; W 2–0	3	Did not advance		

Women's

Athlete	Event	Group stage				Semifinals	Final	
Athlete	Event	Opposition Score	Opposition Score	Opposition Score	Rank	Opposition Score	Opposition Score	Rank
Razmah Anam; Veronica Asli; Norzubaidah Che Ab Wahab; Nor Suhaida Jafri; Hadinavilla Jumidil; Kamisah Khamis; Azeira Lusian; Syifa Najwa Zam Sairon; Putri Nurleesya Azli; Nadillatul Rosmahani Saidin; Emilia Eva Natasha Saudia; Nur Fatihah Sharudin; Hadifitri Navilla Jumidil	Regu	Vietnam	Thailand	Indonesia		—N/a		
Razmah Anam; Veronica Asli; Norzubaidah Che Ab Wahab; Nor Suhaida Jafri; Hadinavilla Jumidil; Kamisah Khamis; Azeira Lusian; Syifa Najwa Zam Sairon; Putri Nurleesya Azli; Nadillatul Rosmahani Saidin; Emilia Eva Natasha Saudia; Nur Fatihah Sharudin; Hadifitri Navilla Jumidil	Team Regu	Cambodia; W WO	Myanmar; L 1–2	Indonesia; L 0–3	3	Did not advance		
Razmah Anam; Veronica Asli; Norzubaidah Che Ab Wahab; Nor Suhaida Jafri; Hadinavilla Jumidil; Kamisah Khamis; Azeira Lusian; Syifa Najwa Zam Sairon; Putri Nurleesya Azli; Nadillatul Rosmahani Saidin; Emilia Eva Natasha Saudia; Nur Fatihah Sharudin; Hadifitri Navilla Jumidil	Quadrant	Indonesia; W 2–0	Myanmar; L 0–2	Thailand; L 0–2	3	Did not advance		

Mixed

Athlete	Event	Group stage				Semifinals	Final	
Athlete	Event	Opposition Score	Opposition Score	Opposition Score	Rank	Opposition Score	Opposition Score	Rank
Aidil Aiman Azwawi; Noraizat Mohd Nordin; Redwan Hakim Muhammad; Siti Hadinavilla Jumidil; Nadillatul Rosmahani Saidin; Sharifah Fifi Nurdyana	Quadrant	Vietnam; L 0–2	Laos; L 1–2	Myanmar; L 0–2	4	Did not advance		

=== Chinlone ===
Athlete	Event	Preliminary			Final		
Athlete	Event	Set 1	Set 2	Rank	Set 1	Set 2	Rank
Athlete	Event	Score	Score	Rank	Score	Score	Rank
Zuleffendi Sumari; Norfaizzul Abd Razak; Farhan Adam; Aidil Aiman Azwawi; Amirul Zazwan Amir; Muhammad Hairul Hazizi Haidzir; Mohamad Azlan Alias; Muhammad Zarif Marican	Men's linking	81	86	4	83	77	3rd place, bronze medalist(s)

Athlete	Event	Preliminary			Final		
Athlete	Event	Set 1	Set 2	Rank	Set 1	Set 2	Rank
Athlete	Event	Score	Score	Rank	Score	Score	Rank
Veronica Asli; Siti Norliafitri Musmuliadi; Siti Norzubaidah Che Ab Wahab; Razmah Anam; Kamisah Khamis; Nadillatul Rosmahani Saidin; Siti Hadinavilla Jumidil; Siti Hadifitri Navilla Jumidil	Women's linking	54	64	4	149	166	3rd place, bronze medalist(s)

== Softball ==
Team	Event	Round-robin					Final / BM	
Team	Event	Opposition Score	Opposition Score	Opposition Score	Opposition Score	Rank	Opposition Score	Rank
Malaysia	Men's team	Philippines; L 1–11	Singapore; L 0–9	Thailand; L 6–7	—N/a	4 Q	Thailand; L 2–9	4
Malaysia	Women's team	Indonesia; L 3–4	Singapore; L 0–12	Thailand; L 3–6	Philippines; L 0–11	5	Did not advance	

== Swimming ==
Athlete	Event	Heats		Final	
Athlete	Event	Time	Rank	Time	Rank
Andrew Goh Zheng Yen	50 m breaststroke	28.18	2 Q	27.96	2nd place, silver medalist(s)
Andrew Goh Zheng Yen	100 m breaststroke	1:01.39	2 Q	1:03.24	5
Andrew Goh Zheng Yen	200 m breaststroke	—N/a		2:20.58	6
Bryan Leong Xin Ren	50 m butterfly	24.61	6 Q	24.55	6
Bryan Leong Xin Ren	100 m butterfly	55.10	7 Q	53.85	5
Daniel Scott Williams	50 m backstroke	26.67	5	Did not advance	
Daniel Scott Williams	100 m backstroke	57.62	6 Q	57.11	5
Lim Yin Chuen	50 m freestyle	23.01	4	Did not advance	
Lim Yin Chuen	100 m freestyle	51.08	7 Q	50.54	7
Khiew Hoe Yean	200 m freestyle	1:50.33	3 Q	1:48.64	1st place, gold medalist(s)
Khiew Hoe Yean	400 m freestyle	4:01.83	5 Q	3:50.63	1st place, gold medalist(s)
Arvin Shaun Singh Chahal	100 m freestyle	50.89	5 Q	50.40	6
Arvin Shaun Singh Chahal	200 m freestyle	1:51.68	4 Q	1:50.43	3rd place, bronze medalist(s)
Muhammad Dhuha Zulfikry	400 m freestyle	4:02.89	7 Q	4:04.29	8
Muhammad Dhuha Zulfikry	1500 m freestyle	15:45.17	4 Q	16:12.55	8
Tan Khai Xin	200 m individual medley	2:08.60	5 Q	2:05.38	4
Tan Khai Xin	400 m individual medley	4:26.44	4 Q	4:25.98	3rd place, bronze medalist(s)
Goh Li Hen	200 m butterfly	2:07.19	3 Q	2:03.02	5
Goh Li Jie	200 m butterfly	2:10.32	8 Q	2:08.48	8
Tong Yu Jing	50 m freestyle	22.98	4 Q	22.48	3rd place, bronze medalist(s)
Khiew Hoe Yean; Lim Yin Chuen; Terence Ng Shin Jian; Arvin Shaun Singh Chahal	4x100 m freestyle relay	—N/a		3:20.87	3rd place, bronze medalist(s)
Khiew Hoe Yean; Terence Ng Shin Jian; Muhammad Dhuha Zulfikry; Arvin Shaun Singh Chahal	4x200 m freestyle relay	—N/a		7:19.50	2nd place, silver medalist(s)
Khiew Hoe Yean; Bryan Leong Xin Ren; Andrew Goh Zheng Yen; Lim Yin Chuen	4x100 m medley relay	—N/a		3:41.92	5

Women

Athlete	Event	Heats		Final	
Athlete	Event	Time	Rank	Time	Rank
Lim Shun Qi	50 m butterfly	28.10	4 Q	28.19	6
Lim Shun Qi	100 m butterfly	1:02.15	4 Q	1:01.89	5
Lim Shun Qi	200 m butterfly	2:23.52	9	Did not advance	
Chong Xin Lin	50 m backstroke	29.61	7 Q	29.47	5
Chong Xin Lin	100 m backstroke	1:04.84	7 Q	1:04.30	6
Chong Xin Lin	200 m backstroke	2:23.41	6 Q	2:23.88	9
Vivian Tee Xin Ling	50 m backstroke	30.22	9	Did not advance	
Vivian Tee Xin Ling	100 m backstroke	1:06.53	9 Q	1:05.35	8
Vivian Tee Xin Ling	200 m backstroke	2:26.98	9 Q	2:22.19	8
Shannon Tan Yan Qing	100 m butterfly	1:03.46	7 Q	1:02.96	8
Shannon Tan Yan Qing	200 m butterfly	2:27.78	10	Did not advance	
Shannon Tan Yan Qing	400 m individual medley	5:20.52	9	Did not advance	
Isabelle Chiyi Buckley	50 m breaststroke	33.39	8 Q	33.81	8
Isabelle Chiyi Buckley	100 m breaststroke	1:15.90	9	Did not advance	
Phee Jinq En	50 m breaststroke	31.87	2 Q	31.71	3rd place, bronze medalist(s)
Phee Jinq En	100 m breaststroke	1:10.99	3 Q	1:10.09	2nd place, silver medalist(s)
Wong Shi Qi	50 m freestyle	26.86	9	Did not advance	
Wong Shi Qi	100 m freestyle	59.64	10	Did not advance	
Lynna Yeow Yi Jing	100 m freestyle	1:00.10	12	Did not advance	
Lynna Yeow Yi Jing	200 m individual medley	2:29.30	9	Did not advance	
Tan Rui Nee	400 m freestyle	4:41.07	8 Q	4:34.26	7
Tan Rui Nee	800 m freestyle	—N/a		9:35.39	9
Kelly Teo Yao	200 m freestyle	2:06.87	5	Did not advance	
Kelly Teo Yao	400 m freestyle	4:41.75	9	Did not advance	
Yoong Jia Jia	400 m individual medley	5:20.43	8 Q	5:20.84	8
Tan Rui Nee; Wong Shi Qi; Lim Shun Qi; Lynna Yeow Yi Jing	4x100 m freestyle relay	—N/a		3:57.12	6
Tan Rui Nee; Shannon Tan Yan Qing; Kelly Teo Yao; Lynna Yeow Yi Jing	4x200 m freestyle relay	—N/a		8:44.18	6
Chong Xin Lin; Phee Jinq En; Lim Shun Qi; Wong Shi Qi	4x100 m medley relay	—N/a		4:12.81	4
