= Polo at the 2025 SEA Games =

- Venue: VS Sports Club & Siam Polo Park, Samut Prakan
- Date: 3–19 December
- Competitors: 40 from 5 nations

The polo competitions at the 2025 SEA Games in Thailand were held from 3 to 19 December 2025.

== Competition schedule ==
The two polo events, 2–4 goals and 4–6 goals are taking place from 3 to 19 December 2025.

| P | Preliminary | B | 3rd place play-off | F | Final |

| Event/Date | Dec 3 | Dec 4 | Dec 5 | Dec 6 | Dec 7 | Dec 8 | Dec 9 | Dec 10 | | Dec 11 | Dec 12 | Dec 13 | Dec 14 | Dec 15 | Dec 16 | Dec 17 | Dec 18 | Dec 19 | |
|---|---|---|---|---|---|---|---|---|---|---|---|---|---|---|---|---|---|---|---|
| 2–4 goals | P | P | | P | | P | | B | F | | | | | | | | | | |
| 4–6 goals | | | | | | | | | | | | P | | P | | P | | B | F |

== Participating nations ==
- Brunei (9)
- Indonesia (8)
- Malaysia (9)
- Philippines (7)
- Thailand (7)

== Squads ==
=== 2–4 goals ===
| Brunei (BRU) | Indonesia (INA) | Malaysia (MAS) | Philippines (PHI) | Thailand (THA) |
|---|---|---|---|---|
| Abdul Mateen; Azemah Bolkiah; Bahar Jefri Bolkiah; Syafiq Abdullah; Farid Abdullah; Afiq Farid Rahman; Huzaimi Mahari | Glendy Martilas Buyung; Jordy Christovel Ferdinand; Acep Krisnandar; Rico Lianto; Billy Barsel Lumintang; Novel Alva Momongan; Ahmad Rajif Dizadila Ramadhan | Muhammad Edham Haji Shaharuddin; Abdul Rashid bin Hasnan; Muhammad Shahir Akmal bin Mohd Shah; Azfar Mustapha; Muhammad Shah; Amran Selamat | Patrick Antonio Cruz; Jose Maria Augusto de Jesus; Robert Esguerra; Stefano Juban; Angelo Licardos; Eduardo Lopez; Juan Xavier Tengco | Thanasin Chuawangkham; Paitoon Kamta; Nattapong Pratumlee; Aiyawatt Srivaddhanaprabha; Apichet Srivaddhanaprabha; Suphachai Sukhampha; Satid Wongkraso |

=== 4–6 goals ===
| Brunei (BRU) | Indonesia (INA) | Malaysia (MAS) | Thailand (THA) |
|---|---|---|---|
| Abdul Mateen; Bahar Jefri Bolkiah; Azemah Bolkiah; Farid Abdullah; Huzaimi Mahari; Mohd Mazhodir; Idris Sirat | Glendy Martilas Buyung; Jordy Christovel Ferdinand; Acep Krisnandar; Rico Lianto; Billy Barsel Lumintang; Novel Alva Momongan; Dwira Harlie Roring | Muhammad Edham Haji; Ikwan Hafiz Jamaludin; Muhammad Shahir Akmal bin Mohd Shah; Mohd Zulhelmi bin Nadzar; Muhammad Shah; Amran Selamat; Tengku Ahmad Shazril Ezzani | Thanasin Chuawangkham; Paitoon Kamta; Nattapong Pratumlee; Aiyawatt Srivaddhanaprabha; Apichet Srivaddhanaprabha; Suphachai Sukhampha; Satid Wongkraso |

== Medalists ==
| Event | Gold | Silver | Bronze |
|---|---|---|---|
| 2–4 goals | Thailand | Brunei | Malaysia |
| 4–6 goals | Malaysia | Thailand | Brunei |

== Results ==
=== 2–4 goals ===
| Pos | Team | Pld | W | L | PF | PA | PD | Qualification |
|---|---|---|---|---|---|---|---|---|
| 1 | Malaysia | 2 | 2 | 0 | 14 | 9 | +5 | Advance to Semifinals |
| 2 | Thailand (H) | 2 | 2 | 0 | 11.5 | 9.5 | +2 | Advance to Semifinals |
| 3 | Philippines | 2 | 1 | 1 | 8 | 7 | +1 | Advance to Semifinals |
| 4 | Brunei | 2 | 0 | 2 | 12 | 13.5 | −1.5 | Advance to Semifinals |
| 5 | Indonesia | 2 | 0 | 2 | 7 | 13.5 | −6.5 | |

Source: 2025 SEA Games
(H) Hosts

==== Preliminary ====
| Date | Team 1 | Team 2 | Score | Venue |
|---|---|---|---|---|
| 3 December | Thailand (THA) | Brunei (BRU) | 7½ – 7 Report | VS Sports Club |
| 3 December | Malaysia (MAS) | Indonesia (INA) | 8 – 4 Report | VS Sports Club |
| 4 December | Indonesia (INA) | Philippines (PHI) | 3 – 5½; Report | VS Sports Club |
| 4 December | Brunei (BRU) | Malaysia (MAS) | 5 – 6 Report | VS Sports Club |
| 6 December | Philippines (PHI) | Thailand (THA) | 2½ – 4 Report | VS Sports Club |

==== Semifinals ====
| Date | Team 1 | Team 2 | Score | Venue |
|---|---|---|---|---|
| 8 December | Philippines (PHI) | Thailand (THA) | 1½ – 11; Report | Siam Polo Park |
| 8 December | Malaysia (MAS) | Brunei (BRU) | 6 – 9 Report | VS Sports Club |

==== 1st bronze medal match ====
| Date | Team 1 | Team 2 | Score | Venue |
|---|---|---|---|---|
| 10 December | Philippines (PHI) | Malaysia (MAS) | 3½ – 7 Report | Siam Polo Park |

==== 1st gold medal match ====
| Date | Team 1 | Team 2 | Score | Venue |
|---|---|---|---|---|
| 10 December | Thailand (THA) | Brunei (BRU) | 7½ – 0 Report | VS Sports Club |

=== 4–6 goals ===
| Pos | Team | Pld | W | L | PF | PA | PD | Qualification |
|---|---|---|---|---|---|---|---|---|
| 1 | Thailand | 3 | 3 | 0 | 25.5 | 16 | +9.5 | Advance to Gold medal match |
| 2 | Malaysia | 3 | 2 | 1 | 28 | 22.5 | +5.5 | Advance to Gold medal match |
| 3 | Brunei | 3 | 1 | 2 | 16.5 | 19 | −2.5 | Advance to Bronze medal match |
| 4 | Indonesia | 3 | 0 | 3 | 16.5 | 29 | −12.5 | Advance to Bronze medal match |

First match(es) will be played: 13 December 2025. Source: 2025 SEA Games

==== Preliminary ====
| Date | Team 1 | Team 2 | Score | Venue |
|---|---|---|---|---|
| 13 December | Malaysia (MAS) | Indonesia (INA) | 12–7½; Report | Siam Polo Park |
| 13 December | Brunei (BRU) | Thailand (THA) | 2–8; Report | VS Sports Club |
| 15 December | Brunei (BRU) | Indonesia (INA) | 9–2; Report | Siam Polo Park |
| 15 December | Thailand (THA) | Malaysia (MAS) | 9½–7; Report | VS Sports Club |
| 17 December | Brunei (BRU) | Malaysia (MAS) | 5½–9; Report | VS Sports Club |
| 17 December | Thailand (THA) | Indonesia (INA) | 8–7; Report | VS Sports Club |

==== 2nd bronze medal match ====
| Date | Team 1 | Team 2 | Score | Venue |
|---|---|---|---|---|
| 19 December | Brunei (BRU) | Indonesia (INA) | 6–5; Report | VS Sports Club |

==== 2nd gold medal match ====
| Date | Team 1 | Team 2 | Score | Venue |
|---|---|---|---|---|
| 19 December | Thailand (THA) | Malaysia (MAS) | 6½–10; Report | VS Sports Club |
