= Woodball at the 2025 SEA Games =

- Venue: Royal Thai Fleet Golf Course, Sattahip, Chonburi
- Dates: 10 – 14 December
- Nations: 4

Woodball was held at the 2025 SEA Games in Thailand. It is the first time the sport was held in the regional games.

Four countries sent athletes for woodball to compete in six events.

== Medal summary ==
=== Medal table ===
* Host nation (Thailand)

Rank	Nation	Gold	Silver	Bronze	Total
1	Thailand*	6	2	0	8
2	Indonesia	0	4	2	6
3	Malaysia	0	0	4	4
4	Singapore	0	0	2	2
Totals (4 entries)		6	6	8	20

=== Medalists ===
Event	Gold	Silver	Bronze
Men's single stroke	Polrawat Wichaiphanphak; Thailand	Peeraphon Sararat; Thailand	Marga Nugraha Susilo; Indonesia
Men's team stroke	Thailand; Polrawat Wichaiphanphak; Weerasak Srisamoot; Phongsathon Khlaidam; Peeraphon Sararat; Chonlachart Plengrat; Nonthawat Kongprawes	Indonesia; Ahris Sumariyanto; Ahmad Yopi Solpianda; Muhammad Indaka Pia Ramadhan; Ariska; Marga Nugraha Susilo; I Putu Ari Kuncoro	Malaysia; Azizan Zainol; Muhammad Nor Aidil Jasni; Azhar Abdul Wahab; Amsyar Sirhan Saifullah Saharruddin; Hasfizal Samad; Suhaimi Ahmad
Men's team fairway (match play)	Thailand; Kittakan Namjumpa; Jetsada Cheenkurd; Pheera Chaisongkram; Nattawut Moolprahas; Worachet Janthasan; Kiadtisak Saengrit	Indonesia; Surya Aditya Pratama; I Gede Prabawa Darma Nugraha Mapet; Rifqi Najmuddin Najib; Gusti Putu Eddy Supriyadinata; Muhamad Khadiq; Alberthus Nathan Yusanto	Malaysia; Wan Mohd Fahdi Wan Abdullah; Ismail Abdul Rahman; Azmi Ahmad; Sharnuddin Ngah; Zulkifli Said; Khairuazree Sahabudin
Men's team fairway (match play)	Thailand; Kittakan Namjumpa; Jetsada Cheenkurd; Pheera Chaisongkram; Nattawut Moolprahas; Worachet Janthasan; Kiadtisak Saengrit	Indonesia; Surya Aditya Pratama; I Gede Prabawa Darma Nugraha Mapet; Rifqi Najmuddin Najib; Gusti Putu Eddy Supriyadinata; Muhamad Khadiq; Alberthus Nathan Yusanto	Singapore; Kok Tiong Tan; Hock Hooi Chan; Hock Leng Neo; Hua Ju Cheng; Yeow Gim Ng; Meng Jin Len
Women's single stroke	Siriwan Kangkeeree; Thailand	Autchara Thongnim; Thailand	Febriyanti; Indonesia
Women's team stroke	Thailand; Siriwan Kangkeeree; Sirinya Nusi; Klissana Khaodee; Kunlanat Worabun; Autchara Thongnim; Patcharin Audomthip	Indonesia; Aileen Christabel Melati Putri; Siti Masithah; Falisa Galiana Noya; Celsy Silviana; Febriyanti; Finda Tri Setianingrum	Malaysia; Salbiah Hashim; Asmawana Aziz; Putri Maisara Khairul Nizat; Nur Atrisha Shiffa Azizan; Qistina Mohd Reffal; Nur Laili Idani Rosli
Women's team fairway (match play)	Thailand; Amonrat Youyen; Laksamee Seso; Nattathida Meanthod; Ratchanee Na Nakhon; Thanapa Srijam; Thanchanok Sareepan	Indonesia; Ni Luh Made Tahlia Saraswati; Nurizza Nova Mindayati; Ni Luh Manik Purwati; Dwi Tiga Putri; Nur Hafifa Syarah	Singapore; Sooi Kim Tan; Gwenifer Rui Er Mak; Kwee Hueh Neo; Kim Huay Ker; Hsu Sheng Mei Liu; Lifen Xie
Women's team fairway (match play)	Thailand; Amonrat Youyen; Laksamee Seso; Nattathida Meanthod; Ratchanee Na Nakhon; Thanapa Srijam; Thanchanok Sareepan	Indonesia; Ni Luh Made Tahlia Saraswati; Nurizza Nova Mindayati; Ni Luh Manik Purwati; Dwi Tiga Putri; Nur Hafifa Syarah	Malaysia; Noryomhaslinda Senayan; Lee Lee Loo; Widilestari Setianingsih; Nur Zalilah Mohd Sohaimi; Nor Rinda Ramli; Aniah Hassan
