= Sepak takraw at the 2025 SEA Games =

- Venue: Nakhon Pathom Municipal Gymnasium
- Location: Nakhon Pathom, Thailand
- Dates: 9–20 December 2025

The Sepak takraw and chinlone competitions at the 2025 SEA Games were held from 10 to 19 December 2025. A total of 11 medals were awarded.

The draw for the regu and quadrant events were held on 19 October 2025.

== Participating nations ==
- Brunei
- Cambodia (withdrew)
- Indonesia
- Malaysia
- Myanmar
- Laos
- Philippines
- Singapore
- Thailand (host)
- Vietnam

== Medal table ==
* Host nation (Thailand)

Rank	Nation	Gold	Silver	Bronze	Total
1	Thailand*	6	3	2	11
2	Myanmar	2	3	4	9
3	Malaysia	2	0	2	4
4	Vietnam	1	4	1	6
5	Indonesia	0	1	4	5
6	Laos	0	0	4	4
7	Philippines	0	0	3	3
8	Brunei	0	0	1	1
Totals (8 entries)		11	11	21	43

== Medal summary ==
=== Chinlone ===
Event	Gold	Silver	Bronze
Men's linking	Myanmar; Aung Pyae Phyo Oo; Zaw Lin Maung; Aung Myint Myat; Ya Wai Aung; Khant Win Hein; Wai Yan Phyo; Min Thitsar Aung; Duwun Kyaw	Thailand; Eekkawee Ruenphara; Apisit Chaichana; Thongchai Sombatkerd; Noppadon Kongthawthong; Khanawut Rungrot; Kittichai Khamsaenrach; Tawatchai Kongpakdee; Dusit Piyawong	Laos; Vilaphan Sysounon; Souknilun Xaykongsa; Adong Phoumisin; Viriyan Sombutphouthone; Suphick Alomsouk; Anousone Soundala; Phitthasanh Bounpaseuth; Yothin Sombatphouthone
Men's linking	Myanmar; Aung Pyae Phyo Oo; Zaw Lin Maung; Aung Myint Myat; Ya Wai Aung; Khant Win Hein; Wai Yan Phyo; Min Thitsar Aung; Duwun Kyaw	Thailand; Eekkawee Ruenphara; Apisit Chaichana; Thongchai Sombatkerd; Noppadon Kongthawthong; Khanawut Rungrot; Kittichai Khamsaenrach; Tawatchai Kongpakdee; Dusit Piyawong	Malaysia; Zuleffendi Sumari; Norfaizzul Abd Razak; Farhan Adam; Aidil Aiman Azwawi; Amirul Zazwan Amir; Muhammad Hairul Hazizi Haidzir; Mohamad Azlan Alias; Muhammad Zarif Marican
Women's linking	Myanmar; May Oo Khin; Yin Min Thwe; Hnin Eain Si; Thae Thae; Aye Aye Thant; Su Twal Tar; Hmone Nant Thar; Khaing Thazin Phyo	Thailand; Suwanna Petsamorn; Jiraporn Palasri; Pornpairin Paenthong; Suthida Thawantha; Yaowares Chaichana; Yowvalux Jaisue; Vimonthip Sawaingam; Suthida Upajanto	Laos; Norkham Vongxay; Touny Vilaysouk; Vansone Bouavang; Aksonesavanh Philavong; Sone Amphay Soulinthone; May Phiathep; Soukvilay Phimmachak; Philavane Chanthasily
Women's linking	Myanmar; May Oo Khin; Yin Min Thwe; Hnin Eain Si; Thae Thae; Aye Aye Thant; Su Twal Tar; Hmone Nant Thar; Khaing Thazin Phyo	Thailand; Suwanna Petsamorn; Jiraporn Palasri; Pornpairin Paenthong; Suthida Thawantha; Yaowares Chaichana; Yowvalux Jaisue; Vimonthip Sawaingam; Suthida Upajanto	Malaysia; Veronica Asli; Siti Norliafitri Musmuliadi; Siti Norzubaidah Che Ab Wahab; Razmah Anam; Kamisah Khamis; Nadillatul Rosmahani Saidin; Siti Hadinavilla Jumidil; Siti Hadifitri Navilla Jumidil

=== Sepak takraw ===
Event	Gold	Silver	Bronze
Men's regu	Malaysia; Muhd Haziq Hairul Nizam; Farhan Adam; Muhd Hafizul Hayazi Adnan; Mohd Syahir Mohd Rosdi; Mohd Azlan Alias	Vietnam; Đầu Văn Hoàng; Huỳnh Ngọc Sang; Ngô Thành Long; Nguyễn Hoàng Lân; Vương Minh Châu	Indonesia; Jelki Ladada; M. Hardiansyah Muliang; Rusdi; Syamsul Akmal; Victoria Eka Prasetyo
Men's regu	Malaysia; Muhd Haziq Hairul Nizam; Farhan Adam; Muhd Hafizul Hayazi Adnan; Mohd Syahir Mohd Rosdi; Mohd Azlan Alias	Vietnam; Đầu Văn Hoàng; Huỳnh Ngọc Sang; Ngô Thành Long; Nguyễn Hoàng Lân; Vương Minh Châu	Thailand; Sittipong Khamchan; Marukin Phanmakon; Tanaphon Sapyen; Phutawan Sopa; Pornthep Tinbangbon
Men's team regu	Malaysia; Muhd Haziq Hairul Nizam; Muhd Afifuddin Mohd Razali; Zuleffendi Sumari; Muhd Zulkifli Abd Razak; Farhan Adam; Muhd Noraizat Mohd Nordin; Aidil Aiman Azwawi; Muhd Hafizul Hayazi Adnan; Amirul Zazwan Amir; Mohd Syahir Mohd Rosdi; Mohd Azlan Alias; Muhd Zarif Marican	Thailand; Sirisak Anuloon; Sankhai Daoreuang; Varayut Jantarasena; Wuttinun Kamsanor; Sittipong Khamchan; Kritsanapong Nontakote; Marukin Phanmakon; Siriwat Sakha; Tanaphon Sapyen; Phutawan Sopa; Jakkrit Thinbangbon; Thawisak Thongsai; Pornthep Tinbangbon; Seksan Tubtong; Rachan Viphan	Myanmar; Aung Aung; Htet Ye; Khant Zaw Min; Ko Ko November; Kyaw Aung Myo; Kyaw Htoo Aung; Oo Yan Paing; Oo Zin Min; Thu Kyaw Min; Thu Min Thant; Tun Thant Zin; Zaw Shein Wunna
Men's team regu	Malaysia; Muhd Haziq Hairul Nizam; Muhd Afifuddin Mohd Razali; Zuleffendi Sumari; Muhd Zulkifli Abd Razak; Farhan Adam; Muhd Noraizat Mohd Nordin; Aidil Aiman Azwawi; Muhd Hafizul Hayazi Adnan; Amirul Zazwan Amir; Mohd Syahir Mohd Rosdi; Mohd Azlan Alias; Muhd Zarif Marican	Thailand; Sirisak Anuloon; Sankhai Daoreuang; Varayut Jantarasena; Wuttinun Kamsanor; Sittipong Khamchan; Kritsanapong Nontakote; Marukin Phanmakon; Siriwat Sakha; Tanaphon Sapyen; Phutawan Sopa; Jakkrit Thinbangbon; Thawisak Thongsai; Pornthep Tinbangbon; Seksan Tubtong; Rachan Viphan	Indonesia; Andi Dwy Andika; Andi Try Sandi Saputra; Anwar Budiyanto; Jelki Ladada; M. Hardiansyah Muliang; Muhammad Alhasani; Muhammad Hafiz; Nofrizal; Rusdi; Syamsul Akmal; Victoria Eka Prasetyo; Yudha Aswinatama
Men's quadrant	Vietnam; Đầu Văn Hoàng; Huỳnh Ngọc Sang; Ngô Thành Long; Nguyễn Hoàng Lân; Nguyễn Văn Lý; Vương Minh Châu	Myanmar; Khant Zaw Min; Kyaw Aung Myo; Oo Yan Paing; Oo Zin Min; Tun Thant Zin; Zaw Shein Wunna	Laos; Suphick Alomsouk; Phitthasanh Bounpaseuth; Soukkaserm Chanthahieng; Adong Phoumisin; Noum Souvannalith; Daovy Xanavongxay
Men's quadrant	Vietnam; Đầu Văn Hoàng; Huỳnh Ngọc Sang; Ngô Thành Long; Nguyễn Hoàng Lân; Nguyễn Văn Lý; Vương Minh Châu	Myanmar; Khant Zaw Min; Kyaw Aung Myo; Oo Yan Paing; Oo Zin Min; Tun Thant Zin; Zaw Shein Wunna	Thailand; Kritsanapong Nontakote; Marukin Phanmakon; Phutawan Sopa; Jakkrit Thinbangbon; Thawisak Thongsai; Pornthep Tinbangbon
Men's hoop	Thailand; Nantipat Kirirattanachai; Komin Naonon; Supot Padungkan; Anuphat Phunirot; Jharuphong Piyasakphakkul; Sompol Rakchat	Myanmar; Moe Aung Hlaing; Naing Aung Myo; Oo Soe Paing; Oo Than Zaw; Win Kyaw Zayar; Zaw Aung	Philippines; John Deryck Diego; Emmanuel Escote; Vince Alyson Torno; Jason Huerte; Ronsited Gabayeron; Marc Kian Jake Fuentes
Men's hoop	Thailand; Nantipat Kirirattanachai; Komin Naonon; Supot Padungkan; Anuphat Phunirot; Jharuphong Piyasakphakkul; Sompol Rakchat	Myanmar; Moe Aung Hlaing; Naing Aung Myo; Oo Soe Paing; Oo Than Zaw; Win Kyaw Zayar; Zaw Aung	Brunei; AK M. Hisyam bin PG Hassan; Abdul Hadi Ariffin Matali 'Abdul Mu'iz Nordin; M. Azri bin Awang Abdul Harith; M. Hafizzuddin bin Jamaludin; M. Abdul Marteen bin H. Asdi
Women's regu	Thailand; Primprapha Kaewkhamsai; Sirinan Khiaopak; Nipaporn Salupphon; Orathai Sukpama; Ratsamee Thongsod	Vietnam; Lê Thị Tú Trinh; Nguyễn Thị Khánh Ly; Nguyễn Thị Thu Trang; Trần Thị Ngọc Yến; Vũ Thị Vân Anh	Indonesia; Dona Aulia; Frisca Kharisma Indrasari; Fujy Anggy Lestari; Lena; Leni
Women's team regu	Thailand; Primprapha Kaewkhamsai; Sirinan Khiaopak; Nipaporn Salupphon; Orathai Sukpama; Ratsamee Thongsod; Wiphada Chitphuan; Wilaiwan Khodphom; Somruedee Pruepruk; Manlika Bunthod; Masaya Duangsri; Usa Srikhamlue; Panida Bunthian; Kaewjai Pumsawangkaew; Phatchalin Nunkang; Orawan Tonghor	Vietnam; Hoàng Thị Thu Thảo; Lê Ngọc Tuyết; Lê Thị Tú Trinh; Ngô Thị Ngọc Quỳnh; Nguyễn Thị Khánh Ly; Nguyễn Thị My; Nguyễn Thị Ngọc Huyền; Nguyễn Thị Thu Trang; Nguyễn Thị Yến; Trần Thị Hồng Nhung; Trần Thị Ngọc Yến; Vũ Thị Vân Anh	Indonesia; Cici Herfiyuli; Dita Pratiwi; Dona Aulia; Frisca Kharisma Indrasari; Fujy Anggy Lestari; Kusnelia; Laura Dinda Yanatasya; Lena; Leni; Rikha Khilmiyati; Salsa Sabilillah; Wan Annisa Rachmadi
Women's team regu	Thailand; Primprapha Kaewkhamsai; Sirinan Khiaopak; Nipaporn Salupphon; Orathai Sukpama; Ratsamee Thongsod; Wiphada Chitphuan; Wilaiwan Khodphom; Somruedee Pruepruk; Manlika Bunthod; Masaya Duangsri; Usa Srikhamlue; Panida Bunthian; Kaewjai Pumsawangkaew; Phatchalin Nunkang; Orawan Tonghor	Vietnam; Hoàng Thị Thu Thảo; Lê Ngọc Tuyết; Lê Thị Tú Trinh; Ngô Thị Ngọc Quỳnh; Nguyễn Thị Khánh Ly; Nguyễn Thị My; Nguyễn Thị Ngọc Huyền; Nguyễn Thị Thu Trang; Nguyễn Thị Yến; Trần Thị Hồng Nhung; Trần Thị Ngọc Yến; Vũ Thị Vân Anh	Myanmar; Aung Thiri; Eng Lai Ro; Htay Yin Yin; Htwe Nant May Thu; Kyaw Su Mon; Nway Nay Chi; Phoo Phoo; Than Phyu Phyu; Thin Kyu Kyu; Thit Cherry Lin; Wai Hnin Hnin; Wai Khin Khin; Zin Ya Mong
Women's quadrant	Thailand; Manlika Bunthod; Wiphada Chitphuan; Masaya Duangsri; Primprapha Kaewkhamsai; Somruedee Pruepruk; Ratsamee Thongsod	Vietnam; Nguyễn Thị Khánh Ly; Nguyễn Thị My; Nguyễn Thị Ngọc Huyền; Nguyễn Thị Thu Trang; Nguyễn Thị Yến; Trần Thị Ngọc Yến	Myanmar; Phoo Phoo; Than Phyu Phyu; Thit Cherry Lin; Wai Hnin Hnin; Wai Khin Khin; Zin Ya Mong
Women's quadrant	Thailand; Manlika Bunthod; Wiphada Chitphuan; Masaya Duangsri; Primprapha Kaewkhamsai; Somruedee Pruepruk; Ratsamee Thongsod	Vietnam; Nguyễn Thị Khánh Ly; Nguyễn Thị My; Nguyễn Thị Ngọc Huyền; Nguyễn Thị Thu Trang; Nguyễn Thị Yến; Trần Thị Ngọc Yến	Philippines; Kristine Lapsit; Mary Ann Lopez; Rachelle Palomar; Nieva Jane Salon; Abegail Sinogbuhan; Jean Marie Sucalit
Women's hoop	Thailand; Warintorn Setraksa; Chawisa Raksachat; Sujittra Nawasimma; Ketmanee Potjanit; Arriya Namsomboon; Pimpika Moongsupeng	Myanmar; Wai Khin Hnin; Nway Nay Chi; Thin Kyu Kyu; Htwe Nwe New; Than Phyu Phyu; Zar Naing Hsu Tin	Philippines; Jean Marie Sucalit; Rachelle Palomar; Rhea Mae de la Cruz; Mary Ann Lopez; Abegail Sinogbuhan; Kristine Lapsit
Women's hoop	Thailand; Warintorn Setraksa; Chawisa Raksachat; Sujittra Nawasimma; Ketmanee Potjanit; Arriya Namsomboon; Pimpika Moongsupeng	Myanmar; Wai Khin Hnin; Nway Nay Chi; Thin Kyu Kyu; Htwe Nwe New; Than Phyu Phyu; Zar Naing Hsu Tin	Laos; Norkham Vongxay; Vansone Bouavang; Koy Xayavong; May Phiathep; Philavane Chanthasily; Sonsavan Keosouliya
Mixed quadrant	Thailand; Wiphada Chitphuan; Sankai Daoreuang; Masaya Duangsri; Thawisak Thongsai; Orawan Tonghor; Seksan Tubtong	Indonesia; Dona Aulia; Fujy Anggy Lestari; Jelki Ladada; Leni; M. Hardiansyah Muliang; Rusdi	Myanmar; Khant Zaw Min; Kyaw Aung Myo; Oo Yan Paing; Phoo Phoo; Than Phyu Phyu; Wai Hnin Hnin
Mixed quadrant	Thailand; Wiphada Chitphuan; Sankai Daoreuang; Masaya Duangsri; Thawisak Thongsai; Orawan Tonghor; Seksan Tubtong	Indonesia; Dona Aulia; Fujy Anggy Lestari; Jelki Ladada; Leni; M. Hardiansyah Muliang; Rusdi	Vietnam; Huỳnh Ngọc Sang; Nguyễn Hoàng Lân; Nguyễn Thị My; Nguyễn Thị Ngọc Huyền; Nguyễn Thị Yến; Nguyễn Văn Lý
