= Wushu at the 2025 SEA Games =

- Venue: Chaeng Watthana Government Complex
- Location: Lak Si, Bangkok, Thailand
- Dates: 13-15 December 2025
- Nations: 9

Wushu competitions at the 2025 SEA Games took place at Chaeng Watthana Government Complex in Lak Si, Bangkok, from 13 to 15 December 2025. The competition was originally planned to be held at Prince of Songkhla University Convention Center before it was decided to relocate the competition to Chaeng Watthana on 27 November 2025 due to flooding in Songkhla. Medals were awarded in 14 events in two categories, 10 in Taolu (choreographed routines) and 4 in Sanda (full-contact combat).

== Medal table ==
* Host nation (Thailand)

Rank	Nation	Gold	Silver	Bronze	Total
1	Indonesia	5	3	1	9
2	Malaysia	3	1	5	9
3	Vietnam	2	1	0	3
4	Philippines	2	0	2	4
5	Thailand*	1	2	2	5
6	Brunei	1	1	1	3
7	Myanmar	0	3	2	5
8	Singapore	0	2	4	6
9	Laos	0	1	1	2
Totals (9 entries)		14	14	18	46

== Medalists ==
=== Men's taolu ===
Event	Gold	Silver	Bronze
Changquan / Daoshu / Gunshu	Edgar Xavier Marvelo; Indonesia	Seraf Naro Siregar; Indonesia	Clement Ting; Malaysia
Nanquan / Nandao / Nangun	Mohammad Adi Salihin; Brunei	Randall Lim Yi Jie; Singapore	Bryan Ti Kai Jie; Malaysia
Taijiquan / Taijijian	Jones Llabres Inso; Philippines	Tay Yu Xuan; Singapore	Chan Jun Kai; Singapore
Duilian Bare-handed	Indonesia; Ahmad Ghifari Fuaiz; Ahmad Ghozali Fuaiz; Terrence Tjahyadi	Myanmar; Ye Yint Tun; Tin Htoo Wai	Malaysia; Muhammad Danish Aizad Mohd Firdaus Chua; Si Shin Peng; Wong Zi Hong
Duilian Weapon	Thailand; Pitaya Yangrungrawin; Sujinda Yangrungrawin; Wanchai Yodyinghathaikun	Indonesia; Ahmad Ghifari Fuaiz; Edgar Xavier Marvelo; Seraf Naro Siregar	Brunei; Abel Lim Wee Yuen; Majdurano Joel Majallah Sain

=== Men's sanda ===
Event	Gold	Silver	Bronze
65 kg	Samuel Marbun; Indonesia	Charuwat Khunphet; Thailand	Oudomdeth Hongpaseuth; Laos
65 kg	Samuel Marbun; Indonesia	Charuwat Khunphet; Thailand	Xander Alipio; Philippines
70 kg	Trương Văn Chưởng; Vietnam	Saibounpheng Phonh; Laos	Harry Brahmana; Indonesia
70 kg	Trương Văn Chưởng; Vietnam	Saibounpheng Phonh; Laos	Myo Min Htet; Myanmar

=== Women's taolu ===
Event	Gold	Silver	Bronze
Changquan / Jianshu / Qiangshu	Patricia Geraldine; Indonesia	Pang Pui Yee; Malaysia	Le Yin Shuen; Singapore
Nanquan / Nandao / Nangun	Tan Cheong Min; Malaysia	Đặng Trần Phương Nhi; Vietnam	Kassandra Ong Xue Ling; Singapore
Taijiquan / Taijijian	Agatha Wong; Philippines	Basma Lachkar; Brunei	Sydney Chin; Malaysia
Duilian Bare-handed	Malaysia; Sydney Chin; Mandy Cebelle Chen; Loh Ying Ting	Indonesia; Eugenia Diva Widodo; Tasya Ayu Puspa Dewi	Philippines; Krisna Malecdan; Krizan Faith Collado
Duilian Weapon	Malaysia; Loh Ying Ting; Pang Pui Yee; Tan Cheong Min	Thailand; Naowarat Saeyang; Naphalai Saeyang	Myanmar; Thu Pan Htwar; Khaing Sandar Soe

=== Women's sanda ===
Event	Gold	Silver	Bronze
56 kg	Tharisa Dea Florentina; Indonesia	Cherry Than; Myanmar	Felicity Wong Xin Nee; Malaysia
56 kg	Tharisa Dea Florentina; Indonesia	Cherry Than; Myanmar	Banthita Wirachianchot; Thailand
60 kg	Nguyễn Thị Thu Thủy; Vietnam	Hnin Nu Wah; Myanmar	Siti Khadijah Mohamad Shahrem; Singapore
60 kg	Nguyễn Thị Thu Thủy; Vietnam	Hnin Nu Wah; Myanmar	Saowanee Chanthamunee; Thailand
