= Brunei at the 2025 SEA Games =

- IOC code: BRU
- NOC: Brunei Darussalam National Olympic Council
- Website: www.bruneiolympic.org

in Bangkok, Thailand 9–20 December 2023
- Competitors: 65 in 9 sports
- Flag bearer: Walid Lachkar (Wushu)
- Medals Ranked 9th: Gold 1 Silver 3 Bronze 5 Total 9

SEA Games appearances (overview)
- 1977; 1979; 1981; 1983; 1985; 1987; 1989; 1991; 1993; 1995; 1997; 1999; 2001; 2003; 2005; 2007; 2009; 2011; 2013; 2015; 2017; 2019; 2021; 2023; 2025; 2027; 2029

Brunei competed in the 32nd SEA Games which was held from 9 to 20 December 2025 in Bangkok, Thailand. Brunei delegation to the 2025 Southeast Asian Games composed of 135 athletes, officials, and coaches, the smallest contingent among all participant nations.

Wushu athlete Mohammad Adi Salihin won Brunei's sole gold medal in the games. This is his fourth consecutive medal across four separate SEA Games.

== Medal summary ==
=== Medal by Sport ===
| Sport | 1st place, gold medalist(s) | 2nd place, silver medalist(s) | 3rd place, bronze medalist(s) | Total |
|---|---|---|---|---|
| Wushu | 1 | 1 | 1 | 3 |
| Polo | 0 | 1 | 1 | 2 |
| Pencak silat | 0 | 1 | 0 | 1 |
| Karate | 0 | 0 | 2 | 2 |
| Sepak takraw | 0 | 0 | 1 | 1 |
| Total | 1 | 3 | 5 | 9 |

=== Medal by gender ===
Medals by gender
| Gender | 1st place, gold medalist(s) | 2nd place, silver medalist(s) | 3rd place, bronze medalist(s) | Total | Percentage |
|---|---|---|---|---|---|
| Male | 1 | 0 | 4 | 5 | 55.6% |
| Female | 0 | 2 | 0 | 2 | 22.2% |
| Mixed | 0 | 1 | 1 | 2 | 22.2% |
| Total | 1 | 3 | 5 | 9 | 100% |

== Medalists ==
| Medal | Name | Sport | Event |
|---|---|---|---|
| Gold | Mohammad Adi Salihin | Wushu | Men's nanquan + nandao + nangun |
| Silver | Basma Lachkar | Wushu | Women's taijiquan + taijijian |
| Silver | Nur Wasiqah Aziemah | Pencak silat | Women's single |
| Silver | "Abdul Mateen; Azemah Ni'matul; Bahar; Huzaimi Bin Mahari; Farid Abdullah; Idris bin Haji Sirat; Abdul Syafiq Waqiuddin Abdullah; Abdullah Afiq Farid | Polo | Mixed 2-4 Goals |
| Bronze | 'Abdul Mateen 'Azemah Ni'matul; Bahar; Huzaimi Bin Mahari; Farid Abdullah; Idris bin Haji Sirat; Abdul Syafiq Waqiuddin Abdullah; Abdullah Afiq Farid | Polo | Mixed 4-6 Goals |
| Bronze | Muhammad Asllyi bin Haji Asmali; Mohammad Faiz Fikri bin Hj Lamit; Mohamad Noorazlan bin Rosli; Zatie Hidayat bin Saidi; Abdul Raziq Waqiuddin bin Abdul Rahman; Muhammad Asyraf bin Abdullah Mohamad Asrul; Muhammad Abdul Marteen bin Haji Asdi; Mohd Hafizuddin bin Jamaludin; Md Azri bin Abd Harith; Abdul Muiz bin Haji Nordin; Ak Mohammad Hisyam bin Pg Hassan; Abdul Hadi Ariffin bin Haji Matali; Mohd Alifuddin bin Jamaluddin; Ampuan Mohammad Saiful Reezal bin Ampuan Mohammad Norshahlan; Md Efiezul Hakim bin Murah | Sepak takraw | Men's Hoop Event |
| Bronze | Brunei Darussalam Men's Team | Wushu | Men's duilian |
| Bronze | Muhammad Harith Dahlan | Karate | Men's -60 kg kumite |
| Bronze | Hasimudin Ak Ahmad Munib Aiman MD | Karate | Men's -55 kg kumite |
