= Philippines at the 2025 SEA Games =

- IOC code: PHI
- NOC: Philippine Olympic Committee
- Website: www.olympic.ph

in Bangkok and Chonburi, Thailand 9 – 20 December 2025
- Competitors: 1,168 in 50 sports
- Flag bearers (opening): Bryan Bagunas (volleyball); Alexandra Eala (tennis)
- Flag bearer (closing): Eumir Marcial (boxing)
- Medals Ranked 6th: Gold 50 Silver 73 Bronze 154 Total 277

SEA Games appearances (overview)
- 1977; 1979; 1981; 1983; 1985; 1987; 1989; 1991; 1993; 1995; 1997; 1999; 2001; 2003; 2005; 2007; 2009; 2011; 2013; 2015; 2017; 2019; 2021; 2023; 2025; 2027; 2029

The Philippines participated at the 33rd Southeast Asian (SEA) Games from 9 to 20 December 2025 in Bangkok and Chonburi in Thailand.

The Philippine delegation finished in 6th place with a final count of 50 gold, 73 silver and 154 bronze medals.

== Background ==
The delegation consists of around 1,168 athletes who will be competing in 50 sports. It is projected to be the largest ever Philippine delegation. The Philippines had 1,115 athletes in 56 sports when it hosted the SEA Games in 2019.

Tennis player Alexandra Eala and volleyball player Bryan Bagunas are designated as flag bearers for the opening ceremony. Members of the delegation will wear Avel Bacudio's Laro ng Lahi collection for the opening ceremony.

Boxer Eumir Marcial was the flagbearer in the closing ceremony.

== Games summary ==
=== By sports ===
Sport	1st place, gold medalist(s)	2nd place, silver medalist(s)	3rd place, bronze medalist(s)	Total	Rank
Athletics	5	7	19	31	4
Baseball	1	0	0	1	1
Basketball	2	0	0	2	1
Beach Volleyball	1	0	0	1	1
Billiards and snooker	0	1	1	2	7
Bowling	1	0	1	2	3
Boxing	1	3	6	10	4
Chess	0	2	5	7	4
Cricket	0	2	0	2	3
Cycling	0	0	5	5	5
Equestrian	0	1	0	1	4
Esports	1	1	0	2	3
Fencing	0	2	11	13	4
Floorball	0	1	1	2	2
Football	1	0	0	1	2
Gymnastics	3	2	7	12	4
Handball	0	0	1	1	4
Hockey	0	0	2	2	5
Figure Skating	0	1	1	2	3
Ice Hockey	0	1	1	2	2
Jet ski	0	2	4	6	3
Judo	2	3	2	7	3
Jujitsu	2	1	8	11	2
Karate	0	1	6	7	6
Kickboxing	1	1	4	6	3
Modern Pentathlon	3	3	1	7	1
Muay thai	2	1	8	11	4
Netball	0	0	1	1	3
Pencak silat	0	0	7	7	8
Pétanque	0	1	4	5	5
Rowing	1	1	4	6	4
Rugby sevens	0	0	1	1	4
Sailing	1	1	4	6	3
Sepak takraw	0	0	3	3	7
Shooting	4	5	5	14	4
Short-track speed skating	1	1	2	4	2
Skateboarding	2	1	0	3	1
Softball	2	0	0	2	1
Sport Climbing	0	0	1	1	4
Squash	0	2	2	4	2
Swimming	3	9	2	14	4
Table tennis	0	0	2	2	6
Taekwondo	2	6	6	14	3
Tennis	1	0	4	5	3
Triathlon	3	5	2	10	2
Volleyball	0	0	1	1	4
Water skiing & Wakeboarding	0	0	2	2	5
Weightlifting	1	1	1	3	4
Wrestling	1	4	4	9	3
Wushu	2	0	2	4	4
Total	50	73	154	277	6

=== Medals by date ===
Medals by date
Day	Date	1st place, gold medalist(s)	2nd place, silver medalist(s)	3rd place, bronze medalist(s)	Total
0	9 December	Opening ceremony			
1	10 December	2	2	9	13
2	11 December	3	5	12	20
3	12 December	6	9	15	30
4	13 December	4	7	16	27
5	14 December	2	11	21	34
6	15 December	8	5	12	25
7	16 December	4	6	21	31
8	17 December	9	11	17	37
9	18 December	3	4	12	19
10	19 December	9	13	19	41
11	20 December	Closing ceremony			
Total		50	73	154	277

== Competitors ==
The following is the list of the number of competitors participating at the Games per sport/discipline.

Sport	Men	Women	Total
Air sports	5	3	8
Archery	8	7	15
Athletics	36	25	61
Badminton	8	8	16
Baseball	24	0	24
Basketball	16	16	32
Beach volleyball	4	4	8
Billiards and snooker	3	0	3
Bowling	4	4	8
Boxing	7	6	13
Canoeing	20	13	33
Chess	6	6	12
Cricket	16	16	32
Cycling	19	10	29
Dragon boat	14	13	27
Diving	0	2	2
Equestrian	1	2	3
Esports	11	6	17
Fencing	11	12	23
Figure skating	2	2	4
Floorball	20	20	40
Flying disc	11	11	22
Football	23	23	46
Futsal	0	14	14
Golf	4	3	7
Gymnastics	8	13	21
Handball	18	17	35
Ice hockey	21	23	44
Indoor hockey	13	14	27
Jet skiing	6	1	7
Judo	9	6	15
Ju-jitsu	20	24	44
Karate	11	8	19
Kickboxing	4	4	8
Mixed martial arts	2	4	6
Modern pentathlon	6	6	12
Muaythai	9	5	14
Netball	0	12	12
Open water swimming	2	2	4
Pencak silat	12	3	15
Pétanque	11	11	22
Polo	7	0	7
Rowing	9	5	14
Rugby sevens	13	13	26
Sailing	17	6	23
Sepak takraw	15	12	27
Shooting	25	18	43
Short-track speed skating	4	4	8
Skateboarding	3	3	6
Softball	16	16	32
Sport climbing	6	5	11
Squash	4	2	6
Swimming	3	8	11
Table tennis	5	5	10
Taekwondo	12	8	20
Tennis	5	5	10
Teqball	4	3	7
Triathlon	8	5	13
Volleyball	14	14	28
Water polo	14	14	28
Water skiing and wakeboarding	7	5	12
Weightlifting	4	5	9
Wrestling	8	3	11
Wushu	9	3	12
Total	623	530	1,180

== Medalists ==
Medalists are entitled to incentive from the government through the Philippine Sports Commission per R.A. 10699.

=== Gold ===
No.	Medal	Name	Sport	Event	Date
1	Gold	Justin Kobe Macario	Taekwondo	Men's poomsae freestyle individual event	10 December
2	Gold	Xiandi Chua; Chloe Isleta; Kayla Sanchez; Heather White	Swimming	Women's 4x100m Freestyle Relay	10 December
3	Gold	Aleah Finnegan	Gymnastics	Women's Artistic Gymnastics – Vault	11 December
4	Gold	Dean Michael Roxas	Ju-jitsu	Jiu-Jitsu Men's Ne-Waza 85 kg	11 December
5	Gold	Kimberly Anne Custodio	Ju-jitsu	Jiu-Jitsu Women's Ne-Waza 48 kg	11 December
–	Gold	Geli Bulaong	Mixed martial arts	MMA Modern Female 60 kg	11 December
6	Gold	Kent Joerend Altarejos; Mark John Beronilla; Erwin Bosito; Clarence Lyle Caasalan; Mar-Joseph Carolino; Amiel De Guzman; Liam Alexei De Vera; Junmar Diarao; Francis Thomas Gonzaga; Cer Gio Gorpido; Romeo Jasmin Jr. Ferdinand Liguayan Jr. Juan Paulo Macasaet; Mark Steven Manaig; John Leonel Matanguihan; Joven Kenneth Maulit; James Vincent Nisnisan; Jennald Pareja; Nigel Paule; Joshua Pineda; Renato Samuel Jr. Razhley Santos; Kennedy Torres; John Reymond Vargas	Baseball	Men’s team	12 December
7	Gold	Tachiana Mangin	Taekwondo	Women’s -46kg Kyorugi	12 December
8	Gold	Kayla Sanchez	Swimming	Women's 100m Freestyle	12 December
9	Gold	John Ivan Cruz	Gymnastics	Men's Artistic Gymnastics – Vault	12 December
10	Gold	John Cabang	Athletics	Men's 110m Hurdles	12 December
11	Gold	Hokett Delos Santos	Athletics	Men's Decathlon	12 December
12	Gold	Chino Sy Tancontian	Judo	Men’s -100kg	13 December
13	Gold	Mazel Paris Alegado	Skateboarding	Women's Park	13 December
14	Gold	Kayla Sanchez	Swimming	Women's 100m Backstroke	13 December
15	Gold	Jericho Francisco Jr.	Skateboarding	Men's Park	13 December
16	Gold	Agatha Wong	Wushu	Women's Taijiquan + Taijijian	14 December
17	Gold	Margaret Fajardo; John Viron Ferrer; Randy Ferrera Jr. Rhyan Zarchie Garay; Esleken Kedo; Leah Jhane Lopez; Maxine Denise Mababangloob; Daryl John Mercado; Khrizzie Pabulayan; Gabriel Benedict Quitain; Joemari-Heart Rafael; Chino Sy Tancontian	Judo	Mixed Team	14 December
18	Gold	Erin Mattea Micor	Shooting	Women's Open Individual	14 December
19	Gold	Edcel John Gino	Shooting	Men's Production Optic Individual	14 December
20	Gold	Genesis Pible	Shooting	Women's Production Optic Individual	14 December
21	Gold	Rolly Nathaniel Tecson	Shooting	Men's Standard Individual	14 December
22	Gold	Jones Llabres Inso	Wushu	Men's Taijiquan + Taijijian	15 December
23	Gold	Elreen Ando	Weightlifting	Women’s 63kg	15 December
24	Gold	Hussein Loraña	Athletics	Men’s 800m	15 December
25	Gold	Naomi Cesar	Athletics	Women’s 800m	15 December
26	Gold	Joanie Delgaco; Kristine Paraon	Rowing (classic)	Women’s Double Sculls	16 December
27	Gold	Zyra Bon-as	Kickboxing	Women’s Low Kick -48kg	16 December
28	Gold	Jasmine Althea Ramilo	Gymnastics	Women’s Rhythmic Gymnastics Individual All-Around	16 December
29	Gold	EJ Obiena	Athletics	Men’s Pole Vault	16 December
30	Gold	Kira Ellis; Raven Faith Alcoseba; Kim Mangrobang	Triathlon	Women’s Team Relay	17 December
31	Gold	Inaki Emil Lorbes; Fernando Jose Casares; Matthew Justine Hermosa	Triathlon	Men’s Team Relay	17 December
32	Gold	Kira Ellis; Fernando Jose Casares; Raven Faith Alcoseba; Andrew Kim Remolino	Triathlon	Mixed Team Relay	17 December
33	Gold	Karl Nepomuceno; Sanford Vinuya; Kiel Soriano; Sanji Pabico; Jaypee Dela Cruz	Esports	Mobile Legends: Bang Bang Men's Team	17 December
34	Gold	Islay Bomogao	Muaythai	Women’s Combat 45kg	17 December
35	Gold	LJ Rafael Yasay	Muaythai	Men’s Combat 51kg	17 December
36	Gold	Dhenver John Castillo	Sailing	Windsurfing - Men's U19 iQFoiL Class	17 December
37	Gold	Melvin Sacay	Modern pentathlon	Men's Laser Run Individual	17 December
–	Gold	Leila Aban; Lanz Carlo Agnes; Nicky Awid; Marc April Gil Butil; Ysabel Justyn Chua; Ma. Angelique Cortez; Revin Noi Dacumos; Hubberth Kristian Guerero; Jeff Leonard Hortelano; Yvonne Lamigo; Angelli Luzuriaga; Bea Martinez; Paolo Rafael Peralta; Sara Jean Rebusa; Anne Marie Gabrielle Rodil; Armie Saludes; Edgar Sumbi; Quinjune Villanueva	Flying disc	Mixed Flying Disc Ultimate Division	17 December
38	Gold	Olivia McDaniel; Nina Meollo; Inna Palacios; Angela Beard; Malea Cesar; Jessika Cowart; Janae DeFazio; Sofia Wunsch; Hali Long; Ariana Markey; Azumi Oka; Sofia Wunsch; Alessandrea Carpio; Anicka Castañeda; Sara Eggesvik; Kaya Hawkinson; Isabella Pasion; Alexa Pino; Jaclyn Sawicki; Jael-Marie Guy; Nina Mathelus; Megan Murray; Mallie Ramirez; Meryll Serrano	Football	Women's Football	17 December
39	Gold	Alexandra Eala	Tennis	Women's Singles	18 December
40	Gold	Jehanz Maristela Coro; Juliuz Rosh Dela Cruz; Reagan Parco; John Edris Sagun; Justine John Rosales; Kenneth Torres; John Israel Mirano Antonio; John Ken Angelo Caringal; Mark Joseph Quezon Sarmiento; Rustom Masucal Cantos; Mark Janzen Gaspi; Denmark Bathan; Francis Generoso; Lyonas De Leon; Melvin De Castro; Kim Carlo Dimailig Garcia	Softball	Men’s team	18 December
41	Gold	Michael Ver Comaling	Modern pentathlon	Men’s Individual Triathle	18 December
42	Gold	Peter Groseclose	Short-track speed skating	Men’s 500m Short Track Speed Skating	19 December
43	Gold	Kenneth Chua; Marc Dylan Custodio; Artegal Barrientos; Mark Jesus San Jose	Bowling	Ten Pin Men Team of 4	19 December
44	Gold	Bernadeth Pons; Sisi Rondina; Dij Rodriguez; Sunny Villapando	Beach volleyball	Women’s Beach Volleyball	19 December
45	Gold	Mary Joy Alpitche; Roma Jane Cruz; Alyssa Marie Daniell; Skylynne Ellazar; Ma. Angelu Gabriel; Nicole Hammoude; Mary Jane Libaton; Ma. Victoria Magbanua; Neo May Mahinay; April Mae Minanga; Royevel Palma; Angel Joanna Pascual; Jhaycel Roldan; Ma. Charlotte Sales; Alaiza Talisik; Reyae Mae Villamin	Softball	Women’s team	19 December
46	Gold	Janine Pontejos; Chack Cabinbin; Monique del Carmen; Sarah Heyn; Sophia Dignadice; Afril Bernardino; Louna Ozar; Khate Castillo; Trina Guytingco; Kacey dela Rosa; Ann Pingol; Angel Surada	Basketball	Women’s Basketball	19 December
47	Gold	Gabriel Thomas Dinette	Wrestling	Men’s 86kg	19 December
48	Gold	Eumir Marcial	Boxing	Men’s 80kg	19 December
49	Gold	Samuel German	Modern pentathlon	Men's Individual Obslacle Laser Run	19 December
50	Gold	Thirdy Ravena; Bobby Ray Parks Jr. Dalph Panopio; Abu Tratter; Matthew Wright; Robert Bolick; Poy Erram; Cedrick Manzano; Jamie Malonzo; Veejay Pre; Justin Chua; Von Pessumal	Basketball	Men’s Basketball	19 December

=== Silver ===
No.	Medal	Name	Sport	Event	Date
1	Silver	King Nash Alcairo; Ian Corton; Rodolfo Reyes	Taekwondo	Recognized Team Poomsae	10 December
2	Silver	Gian Christopher Santos	Swimming	Men's 200-meter Individual Medley	10 December
3	Silver	Clarence Sarza	Taekwondo	Women’s Taekwondo -46 kg	11 December
4	Silver	Haylee Garcia	Gymnastics	Women’s Uneven Bars	11 December
5	Silver	Yman Xavier Baluyo	Ju-jitsu	Men's 69kg Ne-waza	11 December
6	Silver	Kayla Sanchez	Swimming	Women's 200m Freestyle	11 December
7	Silver	Kayla Sanchez	Swimming	Women's 50m Backstroke	11 December
8	Silver	John Christian Lachica	Karate	Men’s -60kg	12 December
9	Silver	Laila Delo	Taekwondo	Women’s -73 kg	12 December
10	Silver	Clyde Joy Baria; Ronnel Fuentes	Pétanque	Mixed Doubles	12 December
11	Silver	Enrique Enriquez	Shooting	Men's Individual Skeet	12 December
12	Silver	Nusair Lao	Taekwondo	Men's -68kg	12 December
13	Silver	Joemari-Heart Rafael	Judo	Women's -57kg	12 December
14	Silver	Gabriel Benedict Quitain	Judo	Men’s -73kg	12 December
15	Silver	Heather White	Swimming	Women's 100m Freestyle	12 December
16	Silver	Xiandi Chua	Swimming	Women's 200m Backstroke	12 December
17	Silver	Maxine Bautista	Figure skating	Women's Singles	13 December
18	Silver	Rhys Burinaga; Mark Doal; Josef Doctora; Andrew Donovan; Kshitij Khurana; Kepler Lukies; Mark Manalo; Miggy Podosky; Grant Russ; Amanpreet Sirah; Daniel Smith; Christopher Stamp; Nivek Tanner; Henry Tyler; Francis Walsh	Cricket	Men's T20	13 December
19	Silver	Elizabeth Amador	Skateboarding	Women's Park	13 December
20	Silver	John Viron Ferrer	Judo	Men’s -81kg	13 December
21	Silver	Yacine Guermali	Athletics	Men’s 5000m	13 December
22	Silver	Merica Lillyn Chan	Taekwondo	Women’s -62kg Kyorugi	13 December
23	Silver	Kenneth Riley Buenavides	Taekwondo	Men’s -63kg Kyorugi	13 December
24	Silver	Michael Angelo Fernandez	Shooting	Pistol Men’s 10m Air	14 December
25	Silver	Anton Ignacio	Jet skiing	Runabout 1100 Stock	14 December
26	Silver	Lorenzo Pontino	Jet skiing	Ski 1500 Stock	14 December
27	Silver	Joaquin Ancheta; Carlo Baltonado; Richard Gomez; Eduardo Angelo Rivilla III	Shooting	Shotgun (Skeet and Trap) - Men's Sporting Clay Team	14 December
28	Silver	Kahlil Adrian Viray	Shooting	Men's Standard Individual	14 December
29	Silver	Kayla Sanchez	Swimming	Women's 50m Freestyle	14 December
30	Silver	Albert Delos Santos	Weightlifting	Men's 71 kg	14 December
31	Silver	Xiandi Chua; Chloe Isleta; Kayla Sanchez; Heather White	Swimming	Women's 4x200m Freestyle Relay	14 December
32	Silver	Allan Arbois Jr.	Athletics	Men's Marathon	14 December
33	Silver	Artjoy Torregosa	Athletics	Women's Marathon	14 December
34	Silver	Evelyn Woods	Shooting	Women's Production Individual	14 December
35	Silver	Miranda Renner	Swimming	Women’s 50m Butterfly	15 December
36	Silver	Robyn Lauren Brown	Athletics	Women’s 400m Hurdles	15 December
37	Silver	Janry Ubas	Athletics	Men’s Long Jump	15 December
38	Silver	Xiandi Chua; Miranda Renner; Kayla Sanchez; Heather White	Swimming	Women's 4x100m Medley Relay	15 December
39	Silver	Basil Hassan Al-Shajjar; Michael Angelo Mengorio	Snooker	Men's Team - 6 Red Snooker	15 December
40	Silver	Kira Ellis; Erika Nicole Burgos; Kim Mangrobang	Aquathlon	All Women Relay	16 December
41	Silver	Kira Ellis; Matthew Justine Hermosa; Raven Faith Alcoseba; Andrew Kim Remolino	Aquathlon	Mixed Team Relay	16 December
42	Silver	Rogelio Antonio Jr. Paulo Bersamina; Jan Emmanuel Garcia; Darwin Laylo; Daniel Quizon	Chess	ASEAN Chess Team Men Rapid	16 December
43	Silver	Whinny Bayawan	Kickboxing	Men’s 57kg Kick Light	16 December
44	Silver	Mariel Abuan	Athletics	Women’s High Jump	16 December
45	Silver	Yacine Guermali	Athletics	Men’s 10,000m	16 December
46	Silver	Joanie Delgaco	Rowing (classic)	Women’s Single Sculls	17 December
47	Silver	Hagen Alexander Topacio	Shooting	Shotgun - Trap Men	17 December
48	Silver	Tyron Jamborillo	Muaythai	Men's Combat 45kg	17 December
49	Silver	Renz Angelo Amboy	Sailing	Windsurfing - Techno 293 Plus Men	17 December
50	Silver	Aerra JC Mae Relano; Jonathan Reyes	Squash	Mixed Jumbo Doubles U21	17 December
51	Silver	Christopher Buraga; Jonathan Reyes	Squash	Men's Jumbo Doubles U21	17 December
52	Silver	Princess Honey Arbilon	Modern pentathlon	Women's Laser Run Individual	17 December
53	Silver	Noelito Jose Jr.	Fencing	Men's Epee Individual	17 December
54	Silver	Clarisse Nicole Cordova; Kaye Maerylle Alpuerto; Rica Fatima Amores; Gwyneth Diagon; Sheen Perez; Mery Christine Vivero	Esports	Mobile Legends: Bang Bang Women's Team	17 December
55	Silver	Rhys Burinaga; Mark Doal; Josef Doctora; Andrew Donovan; Kshitij Khurana; Kepler Lukies; Mark Manalo; Miggy Podosky; Grant Russ; Amanpreet Sirah; Daniel Smith; Christopher Stamp; Nivek Tanner; Henry Tyler; Francis Walsh	Cricket	Men's T10	17 December
56	Silver	Paulo Bersamina; Jan Emmanuel Garcia	Chess	Men's Standard Doubles	17 December
57	Silver	Merry Joy Trupa; Franklin Ferdie Yee; Erika Nicole Burgos; John Patrick Ciron	Duathlon	Mixed Duathlon Relay	18 December
58	Silver	Shyra Mae Aranzado	Modern pentathlon	Women's Triathle	18 December
59	Silver	Aliah Rose Gavalez	Wrestling	Women's 50kg Freestyle	18 December
60	Silver	Arian Geralin Carpio	Wrestling	Women's 62kg	18 December
61	Silver	Kira Ellis	Triathlon	Women's Individual	19 December
62	Silver	Kim Remolino	Triathlon	Men's Individual	19 December
63	Silver	Peter Groseclose	Short-track speed skating	Men’s 1500m Short Track Speed Skating	19 December
64	Silver	Aira Villegas	Boxing	Women’s 50kg	19 December
65	Silver	Bianca Yasmine Cuevas; Jasmin Cian Alcido; Rhianne Hailie Jade Alix; Rangel Dex Benitez; Jodi Catherine Dino; Danielle Lourdes Imperial; Illeana Venice Jimenez; Cassia Zeth Marino; Larissa Mia Pagdato; Mikayla Dominique Pe Aguirre; Alyssa Candace Sanchez; Kimberly Sze; Kathleen Nadine Tan; Nicole Embalzado; Mikaella Zabrina Anne Lee; Rosalyn Elizabeth Angelina Lim; Georgie Ann Regencia; Rita Ann Ceguerra; Kamil Cubillo; Gabrielle Formoso-Laysico; Shaden Joy Ganac; Gerardine Ling Go; Nikka Marie Villanueva	Ice hockey	Women's Ice Hockey	19 December
66	Silver	Jay Bryan Baricuatro	Boxing	Men’s 48kg	19 December
67	Silver	Charmaine Dolar; Arcenio Cadlos	Gymnastics	Mixed Pair	19 December
68	Silver	Flint Jara	Boxing	Men’s 54kg	19 December
69	Silver	Patrik Nessbo; Victor LindbergLucas Öijvall Perez; Victor Ludvig Porral; Victor Simon Laraño; Victor Noah Laraño; Victor Simon Andersson; Victor Rhodell Esguerra; Melvin Mendoza; Reymon Ponce; Richard Ponce; John De la Peña; Kim Franz; Mattiece Cortez Myllyperkiö; Lucas Werelius; Michael Hedblom; Fredrik Jeppsson Escabel; Holland Bernardo; Patrik Schoultze Castrillo; Mathew Alejandro	Floorball	Men's Floorball	19 December
70	Silver	Ronil Tubog	Wrestling	Men’s Freestyle 65kg	19 December
71	Silver	Paola Lorenzo	Equestrian	Women’s Equestrian Show Jump	19 December
72	Silver	Hayden Ancheta	Wrestling	Men’s Freestyle 57kg	19 December
73	Silver	Janna Allysah Cantalan; Samantha Kyle Cantalan; Sophia Shekainah Cantalan; Queen Denise Dalmacio	Fencing	Women’s Foil Team	19 December

=== Bronze ===
No.	Medal	Name	Sport	Event	Date
1	Bronze	John Derick Farr	Cycling	Mountain biking (Men's Downhill)	10 December
2	Bronze	Rhea Mae De La Cruz; Kristine Lapsit; Mary Ann Lopez; Rachelle Palomar; Abegail Sinogbuhan; Jean Marie Sucalit	Sepak takraw	Women's Hoop	10 December
3	Bronze	John Deryck Diego; Emmanuel Escote; Marc Kian Jake Fuentes; Ronsited Gabayeron; Jason Huerte; Vince Alyson Torno	Sepak takraw	Men's Hoop	10 December
4	Bronze	Agostino Teofilo Alfieri; Miguelito Anabe II; Jhon Carlo Burga; Rolly Bustamante; Johnny Lou Demata; Eric Marc Dumlao; James Herera; Clayton John Lanting; Celfin Naz; Arvin Villagomez	Hockey5s	Men's	10 December
5	Bronze	Lorraine Aldana; Mary Anthonnete Bual; Mariella Milan; Maribelle Natan; Veveca Oliva; Carla Jean Oquendo; Lasantha Mae Rivas; Maureen Agatha Rivera; Metchie Saludo; Christine Mae Talledo	Hockey5s	Women's	10 December
6	Bronze	Jocel Lyn Ninobla; Patrick King Perez	Taekwondo	Taekwondo’s Mixed Pair Recognized Poomsae	10 December
7	Bronze	Godwin Langbayan	Ju-jitsu	Men’s -62kg of Ju-jitsu-Fighting	10 December
8	Bronze	Juvenile Crisostomo; Kobe Macario; Janna Oliva; Darius Venerable; Jeus Yape	Taekwondo	Taekwondo’s Mixed Freestyle Poomsae	10 December
9	Bronze	Paulo Bersamina; Jan Emmanuel Garcia; Darwin Laylo; Daniel Quizon	Chess	Men’s Makruk Triple Blitz	10 December
10	Bronze	Mark Louwel Valderama	Cycling	Mountain Bike - Cross Country Eliminator	11 December
11	Bronze	Marc Alexander Lim	Ju-jitsu	Men’s Ju-jitsu-Ne-waza 69kg	11 December
12	Bronze	Vito Luis Luzuriaga	Ju-jitsu	Men’s Ju-jitsu-Ne-waza -85kg	11 December
–	Bronze	Jean Claude Saclag	Mixed martial arts	Men Modern 65kg	11 December
–	Bronze	Gina Araos	Mixed martial arts	Special Value Modern 54kg	11 December
–	Bronze	Denzel John Alipio	Mixed martial arts	Men Modern 60kg	11 December
13	Bronze	Kurt Bryan Barbosa	Taekwondo	Men's -54kg	11 December
14	Bronze	Felix Calipusan Jr. Jodan Macalipay; Jeremy Nopre	Karate	Kata Men's Team	11 December
15	Bronze	Baby Jhen Buzon; Mariane Mariano	Ju-jitsu	Duo Classic Women's Team	11 December
16	Bronze	Kaila Napolis	Ju-jitsu	Neza-waza Women -48kg	11 December
17	Bronze	Justin Ace de Leon	Gymnastics	Men’s Floor Exercise	11 December
18	Bronze	Frenchesca Coo; Marc Griffin; Derek Hewitt; Eva Dela Torre	Water skiing and wakeboarding	Open Wakeboard Team	11 December
19	Bronze	Leah Jane Lopez; Ma. Jeanalane Lopez	Judo	Women's Ju no Kata	11 December
–	Bronze	Giezel Daya	Mixed martial arts	Women's Traditional -54kg	11 December
20	Bronze	Susan Ramadan	Athletics	Women’s 1500m	11 December
21	Bronze	Justin Ace de Leon	Gymnastics	Men's Still Rings	11 December
22	Bronze	Michael Angelo Mengorio	Snooker	Men’s 6-Red Singles	12 December
23	Bronze	Marie June Adriano	Karate	Women’s Kumite -50kg	12 December
24	Bronze	Santino Luzuriaga	Ju-jitsu	Neza-waza Men’s -62kg	12 December
25	Bronze	Maryanne Jenelle Montalvo	Karate	Women -55kg	12 December
26	Bronze	Andrea Lois Lao	Ju-jitsu	Women's Ju-Jitsu Ne-waza 63kg	12 December
27	Bronze	Jhasfer Camingal; Harry Micutuan	Pétanque	Men’s Doubles	12 December
28	Bronze	Cesiel Domenios; Ma. Corazon Soberre	Pétanque	Women’s Doubles	12 December
29	Bronze	John Matthew Manantan	Karate	Men's Kumite -67kg	12 December
30	Bronze	Aleah Finnegan	Gymnastics	Women’s Balance Beam	12 December
31	Bronze	Hergie Bacyadan	Boxing	Women’s 70kg	12 December
32	Bronze	Daryl John Mercado	Judo	Men’s -55kg	12 December
33	Bronze	Aljen Aynaga	Taekwondo	Men's -58kg	12 December
34	Bronze	Leonard Grospe	Athletics	Men’s High Jump	12 December
35	Bronze	Patrick Coo	Cycling	Men’s BMX Time Trial	12 December
36	Bronze	Jeralyn Rodriguez	Athletics	Women's 400m	12 December
37	Bronze	Paolo Borromeo	Figure skating	Men's Singles	13 December
38	Bronze	Nesthy Petecio	Boxing	Women’s 63kg	13 December
39	Bronze	Gay Arevalo; Denis de Chavez; Christopher Gallego; Godwin Langbayan; Eunice Mocas; Katryn Saldajeno	Ju-jitsu	Mixed Team	13 December
40	Bronze	Alwyn Batican	Karate	Men's Kumite -75kg	13 December
41	Bronze	Paulo Bersamina; Ruelle Canino; Jan Emmanuel Garcia; John Paul Gomez; Darwin Laylo	Chess	Markuk Mixed Team Standard	13 December
42	Bronze	Patrick Coo	Cycling	Men’s BMX Racing	13 December
43	Bronze	William Morrison III	Athletics	Men’s Shot Put	13 December
44	Bronze	Ana Bhianca Espenilla	Athletics	Women’s Javelin Throw	13 December
45	Bronze	Dave Cea	Taekwondo	Men’s -74kg Kyorugi	13 December
46	Bronze	Sonny Wagdos	Athletics	Men’s 5000m	13 December
47	Bronze	Zion Rose Nelson	Athletics	Women’s 200m	13 December
48	Bronze	Krizan Faith Collado; Krisna Malecdan	Wushu	Women’s Duilian Bare-handed	13 December
49	Bronze	Bernalyn Bejoy; Alhryan Labita; Alfred Talplacido; Angel Watson	Athletics	Mixed Team 4 × 400m Relay	13 December
50	Bronze	Joida Gagnao	Athletics	Women’s 5000m	13 December
51	Bronze	Francis Alcantara; Ruben Gonzales Jr. Alberto Lim Jr. Eric Olivarez Jr. Arthur Pantino	Tennis	Men's Team	13 December
52	Bronze	Stefi Marithe Aludo; Alexandra Eala; Tennielle Madis; Alexa Milliam; Shaira Hope Rivera	Tennis	Women’s Team	13 December
53	Bronze	Baby Jessica Canabal	Taekwondo	Women's -53kg Kyorugi	14 December
54	Bronze	Gina Bacus; Julius Philipi Bon; Mark Anthony Bon	Pétanque	Mixed Triples (1 Women + 2 Men)	14 December
55	Bronze	Jefrey Deiro; Rogelio Hermosa; Nelia Lara	Pétanque	Mixed Triples (2 Women + 1 Men)	14 December
56	Bronze	Joseph Javiniar; Nash Joshua Lim; Ronald Oranza; Joshua Pascual	Cycling	Men's Team Time Trial	14 December
57	Bronze	Sendrina Andrea Balatbat; Kheith Rhynne Cruz; Emy Rose Dael; Rose Jean Fadol; Angel Joyce Laude	Table tennis	Women's Team	14 December
58	Bronze	Richard Gonzales; John Russel Misal; Jann Mari Nayre; Eljey Tormis; Edouard Valenet	Table tennis	Men's Team	14 December
59	Bronze	Mark Jesus San Jose	Bowling	Men's Tenpin Single	14 December
60	Bronze	Lorenzo Pontino	Jet skiing	Ski GP	14 December
61	Bronze	Kristine Kate Mercado	Jet skiing	Runabout 1100 Stock	14 December
62	Bronze	Bam Manglicmot	Jet skiing	Endurance Open	14 December
63	Bronze	Angelo Inigo Ventus	Jet skiing	Runabout Limited	14 December
64	Bronze	Juan Miguel Alisaje	Shooting	Men's Production Individual	14 December
65	Bronze	Aeron John Lanuza	Shooting	Men's Production Individual	14 December
66	Bronze	Stefanie Kathrene Lee	Shooting	Women's Standard Individual	14 December
67	Bronze	Heather White	Swimming	Women's 50m Freestyle	14 December
68	Bronze	Logan Noguchi	Swimming	Men's 50m Butterfly	14 December
69	Bronze	Xander Alipio	Wushu	Men's Sanda 65kg	14 December
70	Bronze	Sofielle Prajati Dela Cruz	Sport climbing	Women's boulder	14 December
71	Bronze	Richard Salaño	Athletics	Men's Marathon	14 December
72	Bronze	Raphael Barberis; Michael Blatteis; Harrison Blake; Donald Coleman; Robert Fogerty; Edlen Hernandez; Rafael Phillips; Nicholas Robertson; Jerome Rudder; Luc Smith; Ned Stephenson; Kai Stroem; Charles Warren	Rugby sevens	Men's Team	14 December
73	Bronze	Philippines	Karate	Men's Kumite Team	14 December
74	Bronze	Mark Ashley Fajardo	Boxing	Men's 69kg	15 December
75	Bronze	Mark Louie Camomot; Frenchesca Coo; Maritoni Gatchalian; Derek Hewitt; Andrea Michelle Tanjangco; Raph Trinidad; Maritoni Gatchalian	Water skiing and wakeboarding	Open Cable Wakeboard Team	15 December
76	Bronze	Bernalyn Bejoy	Athletics	Women’s 800m	15 December
77	Bronze	Lauren Hoffman	Athletics	Women’s 400m Hurdles	15 December
78	Bronze	Kristina Knott; Jessica Laurence; Zion Nelson; Lianne Pama	Athletics	Women’s 4x100m Relay	15 December
79	Bronze	Kristel Macrohon	Weightlifting	Women’s 69kg	15 December
80	Bronze	Junel Gobotia	Athletics	Men’s 3000m Steeplechase	15 December
81	Bronze	Gerard Loy	Shooting	Men’s Open Division	15 December
82	Bronze	Jonalyn Parocha; Edgar Villapaña	Sailing	Mixed 470 Doubles	15 December
83	Bronze	Zchielorrae Cerezo; Andrea Mae Emperado; Franchesca Denise Ganaden; Katrina Loretizo; Shieldannah Sabio	Gymnastics	Rhythmic Gymnastics Group All-Around Event	15 December
84	Bronze	Almohaidib Abad	Pencak silat	Men's Tunggal Singles	15 December
85	Bronze	James El Mayagma; Rick-Rod Ortega; Edmar Tacuel	Pencak silat	Men's Regu Team	15 December
86	Bronze	Cris Nievarez	Rowing (classic)	Men's Single Sculls	16 December
87	Bronze	Iñaki Emil Lorbes; Joshua Alexander Ramos; Andrew Kim Remolino	Aquathlon	All Men Relay	16 December
88	Bronze	Mikko Camingawan	Kickboxing	Men's Full Contact 57kg	16 December
89	Bronze	Jomar Bolangui	Kickboxing	Men's K-60kg	16 December
90	Bronze	Renalyn Dacquel	Kickboxing	Women's K-52kg	16 December
91	Bronze	Jansen Pareja	Kickboxing	Men's Low Kick 51kg	16 December
92	Bronze	Janelle Mae Frayna; Jan Jodilyn Fronda; Bernadette Galas; Shania Mae Mendoza; Marie Antoinette San Diego	Chess	ASEAN Chess Team Women Rapid	16 December
93	Bronze	Ofelia Magno	Boxing	Women's 48kg	16 December
94	Bronze	Riza Pasuit	Boxing	Women's 60kg	16 December
95	Bronze	Islay Erika Bomogao	Muaythai	Women's Wai Kru	16 December
96	Bronze	Philip Delarmino	Muaythai	Men's Wai Kru	16 December
97	Bronze	Elijah Cole	Athletics	Men’s Pole Vault	16 December
98	Bronze	Jessa Mae Roda	Athletics	Women’s 3000m Steeplechase	16 December
99	Bronze	Nathaniel Perez	Fencing	Men’s Individual Foil	16 December
100	Bronze	Charmaine Grace Andres	Fencing	Women’s Saber	16 December
101	Bronze	Sarah Dequinan	Athletics	Women’s Heptathlon	16 December
102	Bronze	Russel Je Ricaforte	Athletics	Men’s Discus Throw	16 December
103	Bronze	Jeralyn Rodriguez; Lauren Hoffman; Bernalyn Bejoy; Robyn Lauren Brown	Athletics	Women's 4x400m Relay	17 December
104	Bronze	Leanne Espina; Ana Thea Cenarosa; Danielle Michiko Castaneda; Mary Joy Macalindong; Maricar Convencido; Loraine Angela Lim; Mary Anne Jenelle Yabut; Kristine Marie Teo; Remia Buenacosa; Michelle Datuin; Gabrielle Laysico; Shaden Ganac	Netball	Women's Netball	17 December
105	Bronze	Rynjie Peñaredondo; Van Adrian Maxilom	Rowing (classic)	Men’s Double Sculls	17 December
106	Bronze	Alexandra Eala; Francis Alcantara	Tennis	Mixed Doubles	17 December
107	Bronze	Angelo Fernadez; Carlo Deniel Valdez; Timothy John Poblete	Shooting	Pistol - Men's Team 10m Air	17 December
108	Bronze	Samantha Catantan	Fencing	Women's Individual Foil	17 December
109	Bronze	Janna Allysah Catantan	Fencing	Women's Individual Foil	17 December
110	Bronze	Weljon Mindoro	Boxing	Men's 75kg	17 December
111	Bronze	Warner Janoya	Kiteboarding	Men's Formula Kite	17 December
112	Bronze	Tennielle Madis; Stefi Marithe Aludo	Tennis	Women’s Doubles	17 December
113	Bronze	Christian Jester Concepcion	Fencing	Men’s Individual Sabre	17 December
114	Bronze	Eunice Daniel Villanueva	Fencing	Men’s Individual Sabre	17 December
115	Bronze	Harold Madrigal	Sailing	Men’s IQ Foil	17 December
116	Bronze	Arianne Paz	Sailing	Women’s IQ Foil	17 December
117	Bronze	Jason Baucas	Wrestling	Men's Greco Roman -77kg	17 December
118	Bronze	Callum Roberts	Wrestling	Men's Greco Roman -97kg	17 December
119	Bronze	Aurora Adriano; Rapril Aguilar; Daniela Alayon; Lyka Bajar; Mary Grace Berte; Lhara Maye Clavano; April Grace Harion; Jastine Mandap; Zhalyn Mateo; Josephine Ong; Daphne Jane Payadon; Ma. Alexa Maxine Peñaroyo; Bienca Rozanne Ramos; Jo Nathalie Razalo; Gretchie Roque; Jane Varquez; Raina Airyl Vergino	Handball	Women's Handball	17 December
120	Bronze	Juliana Torres Gomez; Ivy Claire Dinoy; Hanniel Abella; Alexa Larrazabal	Fencing	Women's Team Epee	18 December
121	Bronze	Charmaine Grace Andres; Queen Denise Dalmacio; Jylyn Nicanor; Kaikaku dela Serna	Fencing	Women's Team Sabre	18 December
122	Bronze	Shawn Nicollei Felipe; Nathaniel Perez; Louis Marti Shoemaker; Sammuel Tranquilan	Fencing	Men's Foil Team	18 December
–	Bronze	Maryviel Dublin	Flying disc	Women's Disc Golf Individual	18 December
123	Bronze	Allimar Campos	Pencak silat	Tanding Men's Class F	18 December
124	Bronze	Hannah Ibutnande	Pencak silat	Tanding Women's Class B	18 December
125	Bronze	Harold Ralph Ungaya	Pencak silat	Tanding Men's -45kg	18 December
126	Bronze	Gregmart Benitez	Pencak silat	Tanding Men's Class C	18 December
127	Bronze	Cyrell Covon	Pencak silat	Tanding Men's Class D	18 December
128	Bronze	Abegail Sinogbuhan; Nieva Jane Salon; Jean Marie Sucalit; Rachelle Palomar; Kristine Lapsit; Mary Ann Lopez	Sepak takraw	Women's Quadrant	18 December
129	Bronze	Rea Grace Cervantes	Wrestling	Women's 53kg Freestyle	18 December
130	Bronze	Patrick Daniel Abis; Manvil Billones; Carlo Emmanuel de Guzman; John Steven Füglister; Johann Sebastien Garcia; Francois Emmanuel Gautier; Einzenn Ham; Benjamin Jorge Imperial; Jean Gabriel Isidoro; John Glenn Lagleva; Lenard Regil ll Lancero; Mikel Sean Miller; Jared Julian Nery; Dan Carlo Pastrana; Jan Aro Regencia; Jaiden Mackale Roxas; Eishner Jigsmac Sibug; Jann Gefrey So Tiong; Paolo Spafford; Kenwrick Sze; Carlo Angelo Tigaronita	Ice hockey	Men’s Ice Hockey	18 December
131	Bronze	Richard Gomez; Joaquin Ancheta; Carlo Baltonado	Shooting	Shotgun - Men's Compak Sporting Team	18 December
132	Bronze	Fernando Casares	Triathlon	Men's Individual	19 December
133	Bronze	Pia Tolentino; Loella Andersson; Angelica Bengtsson; Ronalynn Ranta; Helena Vaha-Nissi; Evelina Skarfeldt; Michelle Cortina; Jerylou Berdan; Jade Rivera; Jade Rivera; Roxane Ruiz; Heidi Hyryläinen; Dianne Lyn Villegas; Edelyn Embile; Julia Martinsson; Nathalie Sundin; Hanna Sofia Kronstrand; Hanna Caren Esteves; Keziah Rezemae Espidillon; Annicah Cahatian; Sarah Samonte	Floorball	Women's Floorball	19 December
134	Bronze	Reymark Begornia	Squash	Men’s Singles	19 December
135	Bronze	Jachmann Carmina Joy; Dorothy Grace Asuncion; Jhon Jeoffrey Cañones; Charmaine Dolar; Enrico Ostia; Jmaes Benedict Yray	Gymnastics	Mixed Group	19 December
136	Bronze	Bryan Bagunas; Marck Espejo; Michaelo "Buds" Buddin; Jade Disquitado; Al-Bukharie Sali; Leo Ordiales; Louie Ramirez; Kim Malabunga; Rwemzel "Peng" Taguibolos; Lloyd Josafat; Joshua "Owa" Retamar; Joseph "Eco" Adajar; Josh Ybañez; Vince Lorenzo	Volleyball	Men's Volleyball	19 December
137	Bronze	Juliana Shane Sevilla	Modern pentathlon	Women's Obslacle Laser Run	19 December
138	Bronze	Kristine Paraon	Rowing (classic)	Coastal Women’s Solo (CW1X)	19 December
139	Bronze	Cris Nievarez	Rowing (classic)	Coastal Men’s Solo (CM1X)	19 December
140	Bronze	Janelle Mae Frayna; Jan Jodilyn Fronda; Ruelle Canino	Chess	Rapid Women's Double	19 December
141	Bronze	Paulo Bersamina; Daniel Quizon; Jan Emmanuel Garcia; John Paul Gomez; Darwin Laylo	Chess	Maruk Rapid Men Team	19 December
142	Bronze	Jemyca Aribado	Squash	Women's Singles	19 December
143	Bronze	Jason Baucas	Wrestling	Men's Greco-Roman 77kg	19 December
144	Bronze	Callum Roberts	Wrestling	Men's Greco-Roman 97kg	19 December
145	Bronze	Zchielorrae Cerezo; Andrea Mae Emperado; Franchesca Denise Ganaden; Katrina Loretizo; Shieldannah Sabio	Gymnastics	Women's Group 1 apparatus	19 December
146	Bronze	Zchielorrae Cerezo; Andrea Mae Emperado; Franchesca Denise Ganaden; Katrina Loretizo; Shieldannah Sabio	Gymnastics	Women's Group 2+3 apparatus	19 December
147	Bronze	Christian Anthony Concepcion; Christian Jhester Concepcion; Kiane Nash Felipe; Eunice Daniel Villanueva	Fencing	Men's Saber Team	19 December
148	Bronze	Jian Miguel Bautista; Lee Eigran Ergina; Neolito Jose Jr. Sammual Tranquilan	Fencing	Men's Epee Team	19 December
149	Bronze	Peter Groseclose; Hans Matthew Buemio; Jahn Asuncion; Sun Phil Zablan	Short-track speed skating	Men's Open Relay 5000m	19 December
150	Bronze	Shaelynn Bolos; Xsandrie Guimba; Renee Benitez; Jewel Suguitan	Short-track speed skating	Women's Open Relay 3000m	19 December
151	Bronze	Floryvic Montero	Muaythai	Women's Combat 51kg	19 December
152	Bronze	Mathew Blane Comicho	Muaythai	Men's Combat 54kg	19 December
153	Bronze	Rudzma Abubakar	Muaythai	Women's Combat 48kg	19 December
154	Bronze	Michael Andre Dargani	Wrestling	Men's 74kg Freestyle	19 December

== Multiple medalists ==
Name	Sport	Gold	Silver	Bronze	Total
Kayla Sanchez	Swimming	3	5	0	8
Kira Ellis	Triathlon	2	1	0	3
Kira Ellis	Aquathlon	0	2	0	2
Chino Sy Tancontian	Judo	2	0	0	2
Heather White	Swimming	1	3	1	5
Xiandi Chua	Swimming	1	3	0	4
Peter Groseclose	Short-track speed skating	1	1	1	3
Joanie Delgaco	Rowing	1	1	0	2
Joemari-Heart Rafael	Judo	1	1	0	2
Chloe Isleta	Swimming	1	1	0	2
John Viron Ferrer	Judo	1	1	0	2
Alexandra Eala	Tennis	1	0	2	3
Aleah Finnegan	Artistic gymnastics	1	0	1	2
Daryl John Mercado	Judo	1	0	1	2
Justin Kobe Macario	Taekwondo	1	0	1	2
Paulo Bersamina	Chess	0	2	2	4
Jan Emmanuel Garcia	Chess	0	2	2	4
Yacine Guermali	Athletics	0	2	0	2
Miranda Renner	Swimming	0	2	0	2
Joaquin Ancheta	Shooting	0	1	1	2
Carlo Baltonado	Shooting	0	1	1	2
Robyn Lauren Brown	Athletics	0	1	1	2
Richard Gomez	Shooting	0	1	1	2
Lorenzo Pontino	Jet skiing	0	1	1	2
Francis Alcantara	Tennis	0	0	2	2
Stefi Marithe Aludo	Tennis	0	0	2	2
Patrick Coo	Cycling	0	0	2	2
Justine Ace de Leon	Artistic gymnastics	0	0	2	2
Lauren Hoffman	Athletics	0	0	2	2
Darwin Laylo	Chess	0	0	2	2
Tennielle Madis	Tennis	0	0	2	2

== Air Sports (demonstration) ==
Athlete	Event	Round 1	Round 2	Total	Rank
Junrey Cambal	Men's Individual Paragliding	10	26	36	6
Jokohsuprianto Nasir Villanueva	Men's Individual Paragliding	157	362	519	11
Kelvin Liyangna	Men's Individual Paragliding	259	520	779	12
Dominique Loraine Mikaela Lucasi	Women's Individual Paragliding	514	1114	1628	10
Sherlyne Pugong	Women's Individual Paragliding	669	1269	1938	11
Arlyne Pugong	Women's Individual Paragliding	800	1384	2184	12

== Archery ==
Recurve

Athlete	Event	Qualification Round		Round of 16	Quarterfinal	Semifinal	Final	Rank
Athlete	Event	Score	Seed	Opposition score	Opposition score	Opposition score	Opposition score	Rank
Girvin Cullen Garcia	Men's individual	647	16Q	Busthamin (MAS); L 0–6	Did not advance			
Renian Keith Nawew	Men's individual	641	17Q	Nguyễn M.Đ. (VIE); L 0–6	Did not advance			
Jonathan Ebbinghans Reaport	Men's individual	640	19	Did not advance				
Jason Emmanuel Feliciano	Men's individual	620	25	Did not advance				
Girvin Cullen Garcia; Renian Keith Nawew; Jonathan Ebbinghans Reaport	Men's team	—N/a			Malaysia (MAS); L 1–5	Did not advance		
Naina Dominique Tagle	Women's individual	645	8Q	Pyae (MYA); W 7–1	Choirunisa (INA); L 0–6	Did not advance		
Giuliana Vernice Garcia	Women's individual	633	13Q	Yeo (SGP); L 1–7	Did not advance			
Gabrielle Monica Bidaure	Women's individual	610	19	Did not advance				
Pia Elizabeth Angela Bidaure	Women's individual	Did not start						
Naina Dominique Tagle; Giuliana Vernice Garcia; Gabrielle Monica Bidaure	Women's team	—N/a			Thailand (THA); L 2–6	Did not advance		
Girvin Cullen Garcia; Naina Dominique Tagle	Mixed Team	—N/a			Singapore (SGP); L 2–6	Did not advance		

Compound

Athlete	Event	Qualification Round		Round of 16	Quarterfinal	Semifinal	Final	Rank
Athlete	Event	Score	Seed	Opposition score	Opposition score	Opposition score	Opposition score	Rank
Paul Marton Dela Cruz	Men's individual	689	15	Kohkaew (THA); L 142–144	Did not advance			
Carl Vangeo Datan	Men's individual	683	19	Dâng (VIE); L 144–146	Did not advance			
Florante Matan	Men's individual	678	21	Did not advance				
Alon Yuan Jucutan	Men's individual	675	23	Did not advance				
Paul Marton Dela Cruz; Carl Vangeo Datan; Florante Matan	Men's team	—N/a			Malaysia (MAS); L 228–230	Did not advance		
Amaya Amparo Cojuangco	Women's individual	699GR	1Q	Bye	Low (SGP); W 146–141	Ong (SGP); L 142–144	Ng (MAS); L 134–139	4
Arianna Danielle Lim	Women's individual	671	18Q	Ong (SGP); L 139–140	Did not advance			
Kristine Madeline Ibag	Women's individual	665	20	Did not advance				
Vanesa Caparas	Women's individual	664	21	Did not advance				
Amaya Amparo Cojuangco; Arianna Danielle Lim; Kristine Madeline Ibag	Women's team	—N/a			Singapore (SGP); L 221–226	Did not advance		
Amaya Amparo Cojuangco; Paul Marton Dela Cruz	Mixed Team	—N/a			Vietnam (VIE); L 156–157	Did not advance		

== Athletics ==
Key

- Note–Ranks given for track events are within the athlete's heat only
- Q = Qualified for the next round
- q = Qualified for the next round as a fastest loser or, in field events, by position without achieving the qualifying target
- NR = National record
- GR = SEA Games record
- N/A = Round not applicable for the event
- Bye = Athlete not required to compete in round

=== Men's ===
Track and road events

Athlete	Event	Heats			Final	
Athlete	Event	Heat	Time	Rank	Time	Rank
Kent Jardin	100m	2	10.78	6q	10.96	8
Anfernee Lopena	100m	1	10.60	5	Did not advance	
Neil Catral	200m	1	20.91	3Q	21.47	6
Pi Durden Wangkay	200m	2	22.08	5	Did not advance	
Frederick Ramirez	400m	2	47.75	5q	48.41	7
Hussein Loraña	800m	2	1:51.55	1	1:48.80	1st place, gold medalist(s)
David Matibag	800m	1	1:54.35	4	Did not advance	
Alfrence Braza	1500m	—N/a			3:50.69	4
AJ Monton	1500m	—N/a			3:56.21	5
Yacine Guermali	5000m	—N/a			14:47.33	2nd place, silver medalist(s)
Sonny Wagdos	5000m	—N/a			14:48.01	3rd place, bronze medalist(s)
Yacine Guermali	10000m	—N/a			29:43.94	2nd place, silver medalist(s)
Sonny Wagdos	10000m	—N/a			30:35.18	4
Clinton Bautista	110m hurdles	—N/a			14.04	5
John Cabang	110m hurdles	—N/a			13.66	1st place, gold medalist(s)
Eric Cray	400m hurdles	—N/a			54.67	7
Tochukwu Okolo	400m hurdles	—N/a			51.17	4
Junel Gobotia	3000m steeplechase	—N/a			8:58.34	3rd place, bronze medalist(s)
Clinton Bautista; Neil Catral; Eric Cray; Kent Jardin; Alhryan Labita; Anfernee Lopena; Pi Durden Wangkay	4 × 100m relay	—N/a			40.11	5
Eric Cray; Michael del Prado; Alhryan Labita; Hussein Loraña; Tochukwu Okolo; Kharis Pantonial; Frederick Ramirez; Alfred Talplacido	4 × 400m relay	—N/a			3:10.94	4
Arlan Arbois Jr.	Marathon	—N/a			02:30:19	2nd place, silver medalist(s)
Richard Salaño	Marathon	—N/a			02:31:29	3rd place, bronze medalist(s)
Vincent Dela Cruz	20km race walk	—N/a			DSQ	
Carlos de Imus	20km race walk	—N/a			DSQ	

Field events

Athlete	Event	Final	
Athlete	Event	Distance	Position
Kent Celeste	High jump	2.09	4
Leonard Grospe	High jump	2.19	3rd place, bronze medalist(s)
Elijah Kevin Cole	Pole vault	5.20	3rd place, bronze medalist(s)
EJ Obiena	Pole vault	5.70 GR	1st place, gold medalist(s)
Clint Neri	Long jump	7.40	5
Janry Ubas	Long jump	7.64	2nd place, silver medalist(s)
Mark Harry Diones	Triple jump	15.41m	8
Ronne Malipay	Triple jump	15.75m	5
Sidney Yap	Hammer throw	56.47	5
William Morrison III	Shot put	16.66	3rd place, bronze medalist(s)
William Morrison III	Discus throw	46.34	8
Russel Ricaforte	Discus throw	53.34	3rd place, bronze medalist(s)

Athlete	Event	100m	LJ	SP	HJ	400 m	110m H	DT	PV	JV	1500m	Total	Rank
Hokett Delos Santos	Decathlon	791; 11.32	639; 6.24	565; 11.32	610; 1.78	841; 49.44	848; 15.01	554; 34.54	849; 4.80	615; 51.77	605; 4:52.22	6917 pts	1st place, gold medalist(s)
Janry Ubas	Decathlon	863; 10.99	977; 7.67	519; 10.55	740; 1.93	672; 53.23	791; 15.49	506; 32.11	617; 4.00	547; 47.16	341; 5:42.31	6573 pts	4

=== Women's ===
Track and road events

Athlete	Event	Heats			Final	
Athlete	Event	Heat	Time	Rank	Time	Rank
Kristina Knott	100m	1	11.72	4q	11.71	6
Zion Corrales-Nelson	100m	2	11.62	2Q	11.70	5
Kristina Knott	200m	1	23.94	2	24.28	5
Zion Corrales-Nelson	200m	2	23.62	2	23.50	3rd place, bronze medalist(s)
Jeralyn Rodriguez	400m	—N/a			53.40	3rd place, bronze medalist(s)
Angel Watson	400m	—N/a			54.98	6
Bernalyn Bejoy	800m	—N/a			2:10.6	3rd place, bronze medalist(s)
Naomi Cesar	800m	—N/a			2:10.2	1st place, gold medalist(s)
Naomi Cesar	1500m	—N/a			4:45.59	5
Susan Ramadan	1500m	—N/a			4:38.74	3rd place, bronze medalist(s)
Jessa Mae Roda	5000m	—N/a			18:19.1	7
Joida Gagnao	5000m	—N/a			17:09.9	3rd place, bronze medalist(s)
Joida Gagnao	10000m	—N/a			36:41.44	4
Lauren Hoffman	100m hurdles	—N/a			13.53	4
Jelly Paragile	100m hurdles	—N/a			14.72	8
Robyn Lauren Brown	400m hurdles	—N/a			57.50	2nd place, silver medalist(s)
Lauren Hoffman	400m hurdles	—N/a			57.75	3rd place, bronze medalist(s)
Edna Magtubo	3000m steeplechase	—N/a			11:00.44	4
Jessa Mae Roda	3000m steeplechase	—N/a			10:55.68	3rd place, bronze medalist(s)
Kristina Knott; Jessica Laurance; Zion Corrales-Nelson; Lianne Pama	4 × 100m relay	—N/a			43.97	3rd place, bronze medalist(s)
Bernalyn Bejoy; Robyn Lauren Brown; Lauren Hoffman; Jeralyn Rodriguez	4 × 400m relay	—N/a			3:38.92	3rd place, bronze medalist(s)
Christine Hallasgo	Marathon	—N/a			02:57:22	4
Artjoy Torregosa	Marathon	—N/a			02:48:00	2nd place, silver medalist(s)
Sep Blessee Placido	20km race walk	—N/a			01:58:55	6

Field events

Athlete	Event	Final	
Athlete	Event	Distance	Position
Mariel Abunan	High jump	1.80	2nd place, silver medalist(s)
Alyana Nicolas	Pole vault	3.75	5
Sarah Dequinan	Long jump	6.02	6
Amanda Javellana	Hammer throw	51.97	6
Daniella Daynata	Discus throw	45.00	5
Ana Bhianca Espenilla	Javelin throw	51.66	3rd place, bronze medalist(s)
Evalyn Palabrica	Javelin throw	47.08	5

Athlete	Event	100m H	HJ	SP	200 m	LJ	JT	800m	Total	Rank
Sarah Dequinan	Heptathlon	888; 14.65	855; 1.70	568; 10.59	800; 25.97	768; 5.73	741; 43.84	581; 2:39.33	5,201 pts	3rd place, bronze medalist(s)

=== Mixed ===
Team	Event	Final	
Team	Event	Time	Rank
Bernalyn Bejoy; Alhryan Labita; Alfred Talplacido; Angel Watson	4 × 400m relay	3:27.22	3rd place, bronze medalist(s)

== Badminton ==
=== Men's ===
Player	Event	Round of 16	Quarterfinals	Semifinals	Final	
Player	Event	Opposition Score	Opposition Score	Opposition Score	Opposition Score	Rank
Jewel Albo	Singles	Loh Kean Yew (SGP); L (17–21, 19–21)	Did not advance			
Clarence Villaflor	Singles	Xayyalath Souksavat (LAO); W (21–11, 21–8)	Alwi Farhan (INA); L(18–21,14–21)	Did not advance		
Julius Villabrill; Solomon Padiz Jr.	Doubles	Howin Wong/ Donovan Willard Wee (SGP); W (21–16, 21–18)	Sabar Karyaman Gutama/ Muhammad Reza Pahlevi Isfahani (INA); L (11–21,17–21)	Did not advance		
Christian Bernardo; Alvin Morada	Doubles	Wesley Koh/ Junsuke Kubo (SGP); L (10–21, 10–21)	Did not advance			
Jewel Albo; Christian Bernardo; Alvin Morada; Solomon Padiz Jr. Jamal Pandi; Mark Anthony Velasco; Julius Villabrille; Clarence Villaflor	Team	—N/a	Malaysia (MAS); L 0–3	Did not advance		

==== Team ====
Quarterfinals

Philippines
0
Thammasat University Rangsit Campus
7 December 2025 15:00 UTC+7

Malaysia
3

			1	2	3
1	(Philippines) (Malaysia)	Jewel Angelo Albo; Leong Jun Hao	17; 21	18; 21
2	(Philippines) (Malaysia)	Solomon Padiz Jr. / Julius Villabrille; Man Wei Chong / Soh Wooi Yik	10; 21	12; 21
3	(Philippines) (Malaysia)	Clarence Villaflor; Justin Hoh	18; 21	19; 21
4	(Philippines) (Malaysia)	Christian Bernardo / Alvin Morada; Aaron Chia / Tee Kai Wun				not played
5	(Philippines) (Malaysia)	Jamal Rahmat Pandi; Aidil Sholeh				not played

=== Women's ===
Player	Event	Round of 16	Quarterfinals	Semifinals	Final	
Player	Event	Opposition Score	Opposition Score	Opposition Score	Opposition Score	Rank
Mikaela De Guzman	Singles	Lin Lin Htet (MYA); W (21–8, 21–12)	Supanida Katethong (THA); L(12–21,22–24)	Did not advance		
Christel Fuentespina	Singles	Phoutsavanh Daopasith (LAO); W (21–9, 21–11)	Ratchanok Intanon (THA); L(12–21,10–21)	Did not advance		
Andrea Princess Hernandez; Mary Destiny Untal	Doubles	Su Latt/ Khiang Thin Zar (MYA); W (21–8, 21–16)	Bùi Bích Phương/ Vũ Thị Trang (VIE); L (11–21,10–21)	Did not advance		
Eleanor Inlayo; Jeya Von Pinlac	Doubles	Benyapa Aimsaard/ Sapsiree Taerattanachai (THA); L (16–21, 13–21)	Did not advance			
Ysabel Amora; Eve Bejasa; Mikaela De Guzman; Christel Fuentespina; Andrea Princess Hernandez; Eleanor Inlayo; Jeya Von Pinlac; Mary Destiny Untal	Team	—N/a	Singapore (SGP); L 0–3	Did not advance		

==== Team ====
Quarterfinals

Singapore
3
Thammasat University Rangsit Campus
7 December 2025 10:00 UTC+7

Philippines
0

			1	2	3
1	(Singapore) (Philippines)	Insyirah Khan; Mikhaela de Guzman	21; 15	21; 18
2	(Singapore) (Philippines)	Megan Lee; Ysabel Amora	19; 21	24; 22	21; 16
3	(Singapore) (Philippines)	Jaslyn Hooi; Christel Fuentespina	21; 10	21; 14
4	(Singapore) (Philippines)	Insyirah Khan / Megan Lee; Andrea Princess Hernandez / Mary Untal				not played
5	(Singapore) (Philippines)	Jaslyn Hooi / Jin Yujia; Eleanor Inlayo / Jeya Pinlac				not played

=== Mixed ===
Player	Event	Round of 16	Quarterfinals	Semifinals	Final	
Player	Event	Opposition Score	Opposition Score	Opposition Score	Opposition Score	Rank
Mary Destiny Untal; Solomon Padiz Jr.	Mixed doubles	Hoo Pang Ron; Cheng Su Yin (MYA); L (8–21, 14–21)	Did not advance			
Julius Villabrille; Andrea Princess Hernandez	Mixed doubles	Phyo Thurain Kyaw; Su Latt (MYA); W (21–13, 21–6)	Ruttanapak Oupthong; Jhenicha Sudjaipraparat (THA); L (21–19, 10–21, 5–21)	Did not advance		

== Baseball ==
The Philippines is expected to send a delegation.

Team	Event	Group Stage							Final / BM	
Team	Event	Opposition Score	Opposition Score	Opposition Score	Opposition Score	Opposition Score	Opposition Score	Rank	Opposition Score	Rank
Philippines men's	Men's tournament	Indonesia; W 14–0	Singapore; W 17–3	Malaysia; W 21–0	Vietnam; W 21–1	Thailand; W 8–7	Laos; W 12–0	1Q	Thailand; W 5–3	1st place, gold medalist(s)

== Basketball ==
The Philippines sent men's and women's 3x3 and 5x5 basketball teams. The men's and women's 3x3 failed to make a podium finish.

Summary

Team	Event	Preliminary Round				Qualifications	Semifinals	Final / BM	
Team	Event	Opposition Score	Opposition Score	Opposition Score	Rank	Opposition Score	Opposition Score	Opposition Score	Rank
Philippines men's	Men's 3x3	Vietnam; W 21–15	Malaysia; W 21–19	Laos; W 21–10	1Q	—N/a	Singapore; L 20–21	Malaysia; L 19–21	4
Philippines women's	Women's 3x3	Indonesia; L 15–21	Malaysia; L 19–21	—N/a	3	—N/a	Did not advance		
Philippines men's	Men's 5x5	Malaysia; W 83–58	Vietnam; W 78–67	—N/a	1Q	—N/a	Indonesia; W 71–68	Thailand; W 70–64	1st place, gold medalist(s)
Philippines women's	Women's 5x5	Malaysia; W 76–67	Singapore; W 92–59	—N/a	1Q	—N/a	Indonesia; W 66–55	Thailand; W 73–70	1st place, gold medalist(s)

=== 3x3 basketball ===
==== Men's tournament ====
Preliminary Rounds – Group B

Pos	Team	Pld	W	L	PF	PA	PD	Qualification
1	Philippines	3	3	0	63	44	+19	Advance to Semifinals
2	Malaysia	3	2	1	61	38	+23	Advance to Semifinals
3	Vietnam	3	1	2	48	51	−3	
4	Laos	3	0	3	24	63	−39	

Updated to match(es) played on 10 December 2025. Source: 2025 SEA Games

10 December
11:50

Report

Philippines	21–15	Vietnam

Nimibutr Stadium, Bangkok

10 December
16:20

Report

Malaysia	19–21	Philippines

Nimibutr Stadium, Bangkok

11 December
11:00

Report

Philippines	21–10	Laos

Nimibutr Stadium, Bangkok

==== Women's tournament ====
Preliminary Rounds – Group A

Pos	Team	Pld	W	L	PF	PA	PD	Qualification
1	Indonesia	2	2	0	40	25	+15	Advance to Semifinals
2	Malaysia	2	1	1	31	38	−7	Advance to Semifinals
3	Philippines	2	0	2	34	42	−8	

Source: 2025 SEA Games

10 December
11:00

Report

Philippines	15–21	Indonesia

Nimibutr Stadium, Bangkok

10 December
18:45

Report

Philippines	19–21	Malaysia

Nimibutr Stadium, Bangkok

=== 5x5 basketball ===
==== Men's tournament ====
Preliminary Rounds – Group A

Pos	Team	Pld	W	L	PF	PA	PD	Pts	Qualification
1	Philippines	2	2	0	161	125	+36	4	Advance to Semi-finals
2	Malaysia	2	1	1	147	146	+1	3	Qualification to Quarter-finals
3	Vietnam	2	0	2	130	167	−37	2	Qualification to Quarter-finals

Source: Basketball - 5x5 Schedule & Results

14 December 2025
11:30

Results
Box Scores

Malaysia	58–83	Philippines
Scoring by quarter: 22−16, 4−26, 25−20, 7−21
Pts: Ting 21; Rebs: Lee S.W. 10; Asts: Yong 4		Pts: Parks 18; Rebs: Ravena 10; Asts: Ravena 10

Nimibutr Stadium, Bangkok
Attendance: 1000
Referees: Zhang Xiao (CHN), Ong Jin Leong (SGP), Nattapong Jontapa (THA)

15 December 2025
11:30

Results

Philippines	78–67	Vietnam
Scoring by quarter: 16−21, 21−20, 24−19, 17−7
Pts: Erram 15; Rebs: Malonzo, Parks 8 Asts: Bolick 4		Pts: Tran, H. Nguyen 19; Rebs: Dierker 15; Asts: Tran 4

Nimibutr Stadium, Bangkok
Attendance: 500
Referees: Yuen Chun Yip (HKG), Suebpong Wichaiphin (THA), Nattapong Jontapa (THA)

==== Women's tournament ====
Preliminary Rounds – Group B

Pos	Team	Pld	W	L	PF	PA	PD	Pts	Qualification
1	Philippines	2	2	0	168	126	+42	4	Advance to Semifinals
2	Malaysia	2	1	1	137	110	+27	3	Qualification to Quarterfinals
3	Singapore	2	0	2	93	162	−69	2	Qualification to Quarterfinals

Source: Basketball - 5x5 Schedule & Results

13 December 2025
09:00

Results

Malaysia	67–76	Philippines
Scoring by quarter: 18−18, 22−18, 20−20, 7−20

Nimibutr Stadium, Bangkok

14 December 2025
09:00

Results

Philippines	92–59	Singapore
Scoring by quarter: 25−18, 16−10, 25−18, 26−13

Nimibutr Stadium, Bangkok

== Bowling ==
Team	Event	Preliminary Round		Quarterfinals	Semifinals	Final	
Team	Event	Score	Rank	Opposition Score	Opposition Score	Opposition Score	Rank
Mark Jesus San Jose	Men's Singles	1221	11Q	Ismail (MAS); W 266–215	Trần (VIE); L 149–226	Did not advance	3rd place, bronze medalist(s)
Kenneth Chua	Men's Singles	1200	13	Did not advance			
Marc Dylan Custodio	Men's Singles	1196	14	Did not advance			
Artegal Barrientos	Men's Singles	1136	18	Did not advance			
Kenneth Chua; Artegal Barrientos	Men's Doubles	2474	9	Did not advance			
Mark Jesus San Jose; Marc Dylan Custodio	Men's Doubles	2586	3Q	Ameerul / Tsen (MAS); L 420–460	Did not advance		
Kenneth Chua; Artegal Barrientos; Mark Jesus San Jose; Marc Dylan Custodio	Men's Team of 4	4867	4Q	—N/a	Malaysia; W 814–723	Thailand; W 981–865	1st place, gold medalist(s)
Marian Lara Posadas	Women's Singles	1322	1Q	Chang (SGP); L 209–234	Did not advance		
Jelena Grace Gella	Women's Singles	1211	11	Did not advance			
Rachelle Leon	Women's Singles	1175	14	Did not advance			
Dyan Arcella Coronacion	Women's Singles	172	20	Did not advance			
Jelena Grace Gella; Marian Lara Posadas	Women's Doubles	2423	5Q	Redzwan / Ramli (MAS); L 360–417	Did not advance		
Dyan Arcella Coronacion; Rachelle Leon	Women's Doubles	2287	7Q	Larasati / Armein (INA); L 364–373	Did not advance		
Jelena Grace Gella; Marian Lara Posadas; Dyan Arcella Coronacion; Rachelle Leon	Women's Team of 4	4643	5	—N/a	Did not advance		

== Boxing ==
The Philippines sent 13 boxers (seven men and six women) to the competition. Olympic silver medalist Carlo Paalam missed the deadline to compete due to a flu.

=== Men's ===
Athlete	Event	Round of 16	Quarterfinals	Semifinals	Final	
Athlete	Event	Opposition Result	Opposition Result	Opposition Result	Opposition Result	Rank
Jay Bryan Baricuatro	Light flyweight	—N/a	Nguyễn L.P. (VIE); W 5–0	da Silva (TLS); W RSC	Phlongaurai (THA); L 1–4	2nd place, silver medalist(s)
Flint Jara	Bantamweight	—N/a	Daud (INA); W 3–2	Ang (SGP); W 5–0	Saengphet (THA); L 0–5	2nd place, silver medalist(s)
Ian Clark Bautista	Featherweight	—N/a	Sukthet (THA); L 0–5	Did not advance		
Junmilardo Ogayre	Lightweight	—N/a	Ruamtham (THA); L 0–5	Did not advance		
Mark Ashley Fajardo	Welterweight	Nguyễn Đ.N. (VIE); W 5–0	Riwu (INA); W RSC R1	Sinsiri (THA); L 0–5	Did not advance	3rd place, bronze medalist(s)
Weljon Mindoro	Middleweight	—N/a	Bye	Bùi P.T. (VIE); L 0–5	Did not advance	3rd place, bronze medalist(s)
Eumir Marcial	Light heavyweight	—N/a	Bye	Nguyễn M.C. (VIE); W RSC R2	Muskita (INA); W 4 –1	1st place, gold medalist(s)

=== Women's ===
Athlete	Event	Quarterfinals	Semifinals	Final	
Athlete	Event	Opposition Result	Opposition Result	Opposition Result	Rank
Ofelia Magno	Light flyweight	Aye (MYA); W 4–1	Ngô N.L.C. (VIE); L 1–4	Did not advance	3rd place, bronze medalist(s)
Aira Villegas	Flyweight	Bye	Mya (MYA); W 5–0	Raksat (THA); L 0–5	2nd place, silver medalist(s)
Claudine Veloso	Bantamweight	Võ T.K.Á. (VIE); L 0–5	Did not advance		
Riza Pasuit	Lightweight	Bye	Tantawa (THA); L 0–5	Did not advance	3rd place, bronze medalist(s)
Nesthy Petecio	Light welterweight	—N/a	Hasanah (INA); L 2–3	Did not advance	3rd place, bronze medalist(s)
Hergie Bacyadan	Light middleweight	—N/a	Manikon (THA); L 0–4	Did not advance	3rd place, bronze medalist(s)

== Canoeing ==
Athlete	Event	Preliminary		Repechage		Final	
Athlete	Event	Time	Rank	Time	Rank	Time	Rank
Ojay Fuentes	Men's Canoe Single 500 m	2:19.176	3Q	—N/a		2:06.164	4
Neljohn Fabro; Janus Ercilla	Men's Canoe Double 200 m	43.591	3Q	—N/a		42.409	6
Jobert Peñaranda; Ivan Ercilla	Men's Kayak Double 200 m	41.589	4R	40.521	3	Did not advance	
Ivan Ercilla; Carla Joy Cabugon	Mixed Kayak Double 200 m	Did not start					
Joanna Barca; Lealyn Baligasa	Women's Canoe Double 500 m	2:40.348	5Q	—N/a		2:33.209	5
Joanna Barca; Lealyn Baligasa	Women's Canoe Double 200 m	51.132	5Q	—N/a		49.492	5

== Chess ==
Athlete	Event	Preliminary		Semifinal	Final	
Athlete	Event	Points	Rank	Opposition Score	Opposition Score	Rank
Jan Emmanuel Garcia; Daniel Quizon; Paulo Bersamina; Darwin Laylo; Antonio Rogelio	Men's ASEAN chess team rapid	12.5	2Q	Singapore (SGP); W 4.5–3.5	Thailand (THA); W 1.5–2.5	2nd place, silver medalist(s)
Daniel Quizon; John Paul Gomez; Antonio Rogelio	Men's double rapid	5	6	Did not advance		
Jan Emmanuel Garcia; Daniel Quizon; Paulo Bersamina; Darwin Laylo	Men's Makruk triple Blitz	17.5	3Q	Indonesia (INA); L 4–5	Did not advance	3rd place, bronze medalist(s)
Jan Emmanuel Garcia; Paulo Bersamina	Men's Makruk double standard	5	2Q	Vietnam (VIE); W 3.5–2.5	Thailand (THA); L 0.5–1.5	2nd place, silver medalist(s)
Jan Emmanuel Garcia; John Paul Gomez; Paulo Bersamina; Darwin Laylo; Daniel Quizon	Men's Makruk team rapid	10.5	2Q	Vietnam (VIE); L 1.5–2.5	Did not advance	3rd place, bronze medalist(s)
Jan Emmanuel Garcia; John Paul Gomez; Paulo Bersamina; Darwin Laylo; Ruelle Canino	Mixed Makruk team standard	14	4Q	Thailand (THA); L 4–6	Did not advance	3rd place, bronze medalist(s)
Jan Jodilyn Fronda; Shania Mae Mendoza; Janelle Mae Frayna; Marie Antoinette San Diego; Bernadette Galas	Women's ASEAN chess team rapid	11.5	4Q	Indonesia (INA); L 3.5–4.5	Did not advance	3rd place, bronze medalist(s)
Jan Jodilyn Fronda; Ruelle Canino; Janelle Mae Frayna	Women's double rapid	5.5	3Q	Indonesia (INA); L 1.5–2.5	Did not advance	3rd place, bronze medalist(s)

== Cricket ==
Team	Event	Group Stage					Knockout Stage	
Team	Event	Opposition Score	Opposition Score	Opposition Score	Opposition Score	Rank	Opposition Score	Rank
Philippines men's	Men's T10 tournament	Malaysia; L by 4 wickets	Thailand; W by 7 runs	Indonesia; W by 11 runs	Singapore; L by 6 wickets	2	—	2nd place, silver medalist(s)
Philippines men's	Men's T20 tournament	Malaysia; L by 114 runs	Singapore; W by 14 runs	Indonesia; W by 78 runs	Thailand; W by 1 wicket	2	—	2nd place, silver medalist(s)
Philippines women's	Women's T10 tournament	Myanmar; L by 41 runs	Malaysia; L by 26 runs	—N/a		3	Did not advance	5
Philippines women's	Women's T20 tournament	Indonesia; L by 140 runs	Malaysia; L by 6 wickets	—N/a		3	Did not advance	5

== Cycling ==
=== BMX ===
Athlete	Event	Final				
Athlete	Event	Moto1	Moto2	Moto3	Time	Rank
Patrick Coo	BMX Time Trial	—N/a			36.618	3rd place, bronze medalist(s)
Daniel Caluag	BMX Time Trial	—N/a			39.106	5
Patrick Coo	BMX Racing	36.659	36.802	36.623	—N/a	3rd place, bronze medalist(s)
Daniel Caluag	BMX Racing	38.156	38.510	38.063	—N/a	5

=== Mountain Biking ===
Athlete	Event	Preliminary		Final	
Athlete	Event	Time	Rank	Time	Rank
John Derick Farr	Mountain Biking Downhill	—N/a		02:43.68	3rd place, bronze medalist(s)
Simon Peter Servillon	Mountain Biking Downhill	—N/a		02:45.87	4
Mark Louwel Valderama	Mountain Biking Cross Country Eliminator	45.656	4	—N/a	3rd place, bronze medalist(s)
Gart Gaerlan	Mountain Biking Cross Country Eliminator	48.963	8	—N/a	6
Lea Denise Belgira	Mountain Biking Downhill	—N/a		3:22.48	4
Naomi Gardose	Mountain Biking Downhill	—N/a		DNF	

=== Road ===
Athlete	Event	Final	
Athlete	Event	Time	Rank
Marcelo Felipe	Men's Individual Road Race	4:15:21	11
Jude Gabriel Francisco	Men's Individual Road Race	4:16:01	15
Ronald Oranza	Men's Individual Road Race	4:16:13	16
Jun Rey Navarra	Men's Individual Road Race	4:17:10	17
Jeremy Lizardo	Men's Individual Road Race	4:33:09	26
Nichol Pareja	Men's Individual Time Trial	1:09:16	5
Nash Joshua Lim	Men's Individual Time Trial	1:10:35	6
Marcelo Felipe; Jude Gabriel Francisco; Ronald Oranza; Jun Rey Navarra; Jeremy Lizardo	Men's Team Road Race	12:47:35	5
Nichol Pareja; Nash Joshua Lim; Ronald Oranza; Joshua Pascual; Joseph Javiniar	Men's Team Time Trial	1:16:08	3rd place, bronze medalist(s)
Kim Syrel Bonilla	Women's Criterium	—	7
Angelica Mae Altamirano	Women's Criterium	—	8
Maritoni Krog	Women's Criterium	—	9
Angelica Elvira	Women's Individual Road Race	3:56:20	7
Angelica Mae Altamirano	Women's Individual Road Race	3:56:20	8
Maritoni Krog	Women's Individual Road Race	3:56:20	9
Princess Jamyka Aman	Women's Individual Road Race	3:56:28	14
Wenizah Claire Vinoya	Women's Individual Road Race	3:56:28	15
Phoebe Salazar	Women's Individual Time Trial	1:06:07	4
Kim Syrel Bonilla	Women's Individual Time Trial	1:06:26	6

=== Track ===
Athlete	Event	Final	
Athlete	Event	Time	Rank
Steven Nicolas Shane Tablizo	Men's Keirin	13.682	5
Arckem Prince Angel Asas	Men's Keirin	Did not finish	
Steven Nicolas Shane Tablizo	Men's Points Race	1	4
Andre Dennis Deudor	Men's Points Race	–34	7
Angela Joy Marie Bermejo	Women's Scratch	—	5

== Diving ==
Athlete	Event	Final	
Athlete	Event	Score	Rank
Rose Ann Ocmer; Jana Mary Rodriguez	Women's Synchronized Platform	203.58	4

== Equestrian ==
Athlete	Event	Preliminary		Final	
Athlete	Event	Round 1	Round 2	Score	Rank
Toni Leviste	Mixed Individual Dressage	66.617	65.824	69.420	6
Paola Lorenzo	Mixed Individual Jumping	75.74	88.00	73.55	2nd place, silver medalist(s)
Mateo Rafael Lorenzo	Mixed Individual Jumping	75.60	86.36	78.47	9

== Dragon boat ==
Athlete	Event	Race 1		Race 2		Final (Sum)	
Athlete	Event	Time	Rank	Time	Rank	Time	Rank
Philippine Team	Men's Small Boat 200 m	49.589	4	50.441	4	1:40.030	4
Philippine Team	Men's Small Boat 500 m	2:06.683	4	2:10.602	4	4:17.285	4
Philippine Team	Mixed Small Boat 200 m	47.201	5	46.895	5	1:34.096	5
Philippine Team	Mixed Small Boat 500 m	2:00.654	5	2:01.730	5	4:02.384	5
Philippine Team	Women's Small Boat 200 m	55.889	6	56.291	6	1:52.180	6
Philippine Team	Women's Small Boat 200 m	2:22.531	6	2:25.547	6	4:48.078	6

== Esports ==
Team	Event	Preliminary round					Quarterfinals	Semifinal	Repechage	Final	
Team	Event	Opposition Score	Opposition Score	Opposition Score	Opposition Score	Rank	Opposition Score	Opposition Score	Opposition Score	Opposition Score	Rank
John Ferdinand Mariño; Michael Carlo Gonzaga; Jovani Ejercito; Argie Odtuhan; Harold Cabaguing	Men's Arena of Valor	Vietnam; L 0–2	Thailand; L 0–2	Laos; L 0–2	—N/a	4	Did not advance				
Alston Pabico; Karl Nepomuceno; Sanford Vinuya; Kiel Soriano; Jay Pee Dela Cruz; John Carlo Roma	Men's Mobile Legends: Bang Bang	Indonesia; W 2–0	Laos; W 2–0	Singapore; W 2–0	Malaysia; W 2–0	1Q	Bye	Indonesia; W 3–1	—N/a	Malaysia; W 4–0	1st place, gold medalist(s)
Clarisse Nicole Cordova; Rica Fatima Amores; Sheen Perez; Kaye Maerylle Alpuerto; Mery Christine Vivero; Gwyneth Diagon	Women's Mobile Legends: Bang Bang	Laos; W 2–0	Vietnam; W 2–0	Thailand; W 2–0	—N/a	1Q	Bye	Indonesia; W 3–1	—N/a	Malaysia; L 3–4	2nd place, silver medalist(s)

== Fencing ==
Athlete	Event	Round of 16	Quarterfinals	Semifinals	Final	
Athlete	Event	Opposition Result	Opposition Result	Opposition Result	Opposition Result	Rank
Noelito Jose Jr.	Men's Individual Épée	Bye	Nguyễn T.N. (VIE); W 14–13	Chaloemchanen (THA); W 15–3	Nguyễn P.D. (VIE); L 14–15	2nd place, silver medalist(s)
Jian Miguel Bautista	Men's Individual Épée	Yam (MAS); W 15–14	Chaloemchanen (THA); L 14–15	Did not advance		
Nathaniel Perez	Men's Individual Foil	—N/a	Cheng (MAS); W 15–13	Wangpaisit (THA); L 6–15	Did not advance	3rd place, bronze medalist(s)
Eunice Daniel Villanueva	Men's Individual Sabre	Bye	Lee (MAS); W 15–13	Nguyễn X.L. (VIE); L 11–15	Did not advance	3rd place, bronze medalist(s)
Christian Jhester Concepcion	Men's Individual Sabre	Tan (SGP); W 15–12	Wong (MAS); W 15–13	Nguyễn V.Q. (VIE); L 8–15	Did not advance	3rd place, bronze medalist(s)
Philippine Men's Fencing Team	Men's Team Épée	—N/a	Bye	Singapore; L 33–39	Did not advance	3rd place, bronze medalist(s)
Philippine Men's Fencing Team	Men's Team Foil	—N/a	Vietnam; W 45–43	Singapore; L 43–44	Did not advance	3rd place, bronze medalist(s)
Philippine Men's Fencing Team	Men's Team Sabre	—N/a	Bye	Malaysia; L 42–45	Did not advance	3rd place, bronze medalist(s)
Samantha Catantan	Women's Individual Foil	Bye	Shinnakerdchoke (THA); W 15–4	Berthier (SGP); L 14–15	Did not advance	3rd place, bronze medalist(s)
Allysah Catantan	Women's Individual Foil	Bye	Rizzal (MAS); W 15–8	Wong (SGP); L 8–15	Did not advance	3rd place, bronze medalist(s)
Charmaine Grace Andres	Women's Individual Sabre	Bye	Anggraini (INA); W 15–9	Heng (SGP); L 7–15	Did not advance	3rd place, bronze medalist(s)
Jylyn Nicanor	Women's Individual Sabre	Bye	Phokaew (THA); L 12–15	Did not advance		
Philippine Women's Fencing Team	Women's Team Épée	—N/a	Indonesia; W 45–19	Singapore; L 40–45	Did not advance	3rd place, bronze medalist(s)
Philippine Women's Fencing Team	Women's Team Foil	—N/a	Bye	Thailand; W 41–40	Singapore; L 31–45	2nd place, silver medalist(s)
Philippine Women's Fencing Team	Women's Team Sabre	—N/a	Bye	Thailand; W 35–45	Did not advance	3rd place, bronze medalist(s)

== Figure skating ==
Athlete	Event	Preliminary		Final	
Athlete	Event	Score	Rank	Score	Rank
Paolo Borromeo	Men's Single	50.28	3Q	128.39	3rd place, bronze medalist(s)
Brandon James Baldoz	Men's Single	48.69	4Q	127.90	4
Cathryn Limetkai	Women's Single	47.66	2Q	116.30	5
Maxine Marie Bautista	Women's Single	47.66	3Q	129.33	2nd place, silver medalist(s)

== Floorball ==
Team	Event	Group Stage					Final / BM	
Team	Event	Opposition Score	Opposition Score	Opposition Score	Opposition Score	Rank	Opposition Score	Rank
Philippines men's	Men's tournament	Laos; W 37–0	Malaysia; W 9–2	Singapore; W 6–4	Thailand; L 2–7	2Q	Thailand; L 2–6	2nd place, silver medalist(s)
Philippines women's	Women's tournament	Malaysia; W 4–2	Thailand; L 1–10	Singapore; L 0–8	—N/a	3Q	Malaysia; W 3–2	3rd place, bronze medalist(s)

== Football ==
The Philippines competed in both men's and women's football.

Summary

Key:

- A.E.T – After extra time.
- P – Match decided by penalty-shootout.

Team	Event	Group Stage				Semifinal	Final / BM	
Team	Event	Opposition Score	Opposition Score	Opposition Score	Rank	Opposition Score	Opposition Score	Rank
Philippines men's	Men's tournament	Myanmar; W 2–0	Indonesia; W 1–0	—N/a	1 Q	Vietnam; L 0–2	Malaysia; L 1–2	4
Philippines women's	Women's tournament	Myanmar; L 1–2	Vietnam; W 1–0	Malaysia; W 6–0	2 Q	Thailand; W 4–2^{P} 1–1 (a.e.t.)	Vietnam; W 6–5^{P} 0–0 (a.e.t.)	1st place, gold medalist(s)

=== Men's tournament ===
Team roster

Philippines announced their final squad on 4 December 2025.

Head coach: (Australia) Garreth McPherson

No.	Pos.	Player	Date of birth (age)	Caps	Goals	Club
1	GK	Nicholas Guimarães	9 August 2006 (aged 19)	8	0	(Japan Football Association) Juntendo University
2	DF	Noah Leddel	30 August 2003 (aged 22)	10	1	(Philippine Football Federation) Dynamic Herb Cebu
3	DF	Gabriel Guimarães	9 August 2006 (aged 19)	1	0	(Japan Football Association) Ichikawa SC
4	DF	Isaiah Alakiu	7 October 2007 (aged 17)	3	0	(The Football Association) Brighton & Hove Albion
5	DF	Joshua Meriño	11 February 2005 (aged 20)	8	0	(Philippine Football Federation) University of the Philippines
6	MF	Sandro Reyes	29 March 2003 (aged 22)	12	3	(German Football Association) FC Gütersloh
7	FW	Dylan Demuynck	6 May 2004 (aged 21)	0	0	(Royal Belgian Football Association) Lierse
8	MF	Gavin Muens	24 October 2004 (aged 20)	14	1	(Philippine Football Federation) Kaya–Iloilo
9	FW	Andres Aldeguer	18 December 2003 (aged 21)	9	0	(Philippine Football Federation) One Taguig
10	MF	Javier Mariona	17 October 2004 (aged 20)	8	3	(United States Soccer Federation) AV Alta
11	FW	Dov Cariño	18 December 2003 (aged 21)	14	2	(Philippine Football Federation) Ateneo de Manila University
12	GK	Alfonso Gonzalez	5 January 2005 (aged 20)	0	0	(Philippine Football Federation) University of the Philippines
13	FW	Alex Monis	20 March 2003 (aged 22)	3	0	(United States Soccer Federation) New England Revolution
14	DF	Jaime Rosquillo	10 March 2003 (aged 22)	16	0	(Philippine Football Federation) Dynamic Herb Cebu
15	DF	Nico McMillan	7 April 2003 (aged 22)	0	0	(Philippine Football Federation) Stallion Laguna
16	MF	Jared Peña	8 May 2006 (aged 19)	13	0	(United States Soccer Federation) Walsh University
17	FW	Otu Banatao	11 November 2006 (aged 18)	8	4	(United States Soccer Federation) Old Dominion University
18	GK	Iñigo Castro	2 July 2006 (aged 19)	0	0	(Philippine Football Federation) De La Salle University
19	FW	Selwyn Mamon	7 July 2004 (aged 21)	5	1	(Philippine Football Federation) Far Eastern University
20	DF	Antoine Ortega	12 May 2003 (aged 22)	6	0	(Cyprus Football Association) Omonia Aradippou
21	DF	Santiago Rublico	18 August 2005 (aged 20)	5	0	(Royal Spanish Football Federation) Alcorcón
22	MF	John Lucero	1 December 2003 (aged 21)	16	0	(Football Association of Thailand) Kanchanaburi Power
23	MF	Stavros Charalampous	23 February 2003 (aged 22)	0	0	(United States Soccer Federation) California Baptist University

Group play

Pos	Team	Pld	W	D	L	GF	GA	GD	Pts	Qualification
1	Philippines	2	2	0	0	3	0	+3	6	Advance to knockout stage
2	Indonesia	2	1	0	1	3	2	+1	3	
3	Myanmar	2	0	0	2	1	5	−4	0	

Source: Soccerway
Rules for classification: Group stage tiebreakers
5 December 2025
18:00

Myanmar	0–2	Philippines
	Report	Monis 19'; Latt Wai Phone 50' (o.g.)

700th Anniversary Stadium, Chiang Mai
Referee: Sadullo Gulmurodi (Tajikstan)
8 December 2025
18:00

Philippines	1–0	Indonesia
Banatao 45+2'	Report

700th Anniversary Stadium, Chiang Mai
Referee: Adel Al-Naqbi (United Arab Emirates)

Semi-finals

15 December 2025
15:30

Vietnam	2–0	Philippines
Lê Văn Thuận 89'; Nguyễn Thanh Nhàn 90+2'	Report

Rajamangala Stadium, Bangkok
Referee: Choi Hyun-jai (South Korea)

Bronze medal match

18 December 2025
15:30

Philippines	1–2	Malaysia
Haqimi 36' (o.g.)	Report	Danish 28'; Haqimi 43'

Rajamangala Stadium, Bangkok
Attendance: 1,325
Referee: Qasim Al-Hatmi (Oman)

=== Women's tournament ===
Team roster

Philippines announced their final squad on 4 December 2025.

Head coach: (Australia) Mark Torcaso

No.	Pos.	Player	Date of birth (age)	Caps	Goals	Club
1	GK	Olivia McDaniel	October 14, 1997 (aged 28)	54	0	(Philippine Football Federation) Stallion Laguna
18	GK	Inna Palacios	February 8, 1994 (aged 31)	52	0	(Philippine Football Federation) Kaya–Iloilo
22	GK	Nina Meollo	June 23, 2004 (aged 21)	1	0	(The Football Association) Real Bedford
2	DF	Malea Cesar	December 9, 2003 (aged 21)	32	1	(United States Soccer Federation) Trinity Tigers
3	DF	Jessika Cowart	October 30, 1999 (aged 26)	40	2	(Canadian Soccer Association) Vancouver Rise
4	DF	Azumi Oka	April 21, 2006 (aged 19)	2	0	(United States Soccer Federation) UNC Greensboro Spartans
5	DF	Hali Long (captain)	January 21, 1995 (aged 30)	96	22	(Football Association of Thailand) College of Asian Scholars
9	DF	Ariana Markey	June 8, 2007 (aged 18)	0	0	(United States Soccer Federation) Pepperdine Waves
13	DF	Angela Beard	August 16, 1997 (aged 28)	20	1	(Swedish Football Association) AIK
16	DF	Sofia Harrison Wunsch	February 16, 1999 (aged 26)	54	3	Free agent
20	DF	Janae DeFazio	September 6, 2001 (aged 24)	9	0	(Football Australia) Western Sydney Wanderers
6	MF	Jaclyn Sawicki	November 14, 1992 (aged 33)	39	1	(Canadian Soccer Association) Calgary Wild
8	MF	Sara Eggesvik	April 29, 1997 (aged 28)	45	6	(Norwegian Football Federation) LSK Kvinner
12	MF	Kaya Hawkinson	April 17, 2000 (aged 25)	23	1	(Philippine Football Federation) Stallion Laguna
15	MF	Isabella Pasion	July 14, 2006 (aged 19)	17	0	(Philippine Football Federation) Stallion Laguna
19	MF	Alessandrea Carpio	March 4, 2002 (aged 23)	5	0	(Philippine Football Federation) Kaya–Iloilo
23	MF	Alexa Pino	March 1, 2007 (aged 18)	5	2	(United States Soccer Federation) Kentucky Wildcats
7	FW	Jael-Marie Guy	August 15, 2007 (aged 18)	0	0	(United States Soccer Federation) Brown Bears
10	FW	Megan Murray	November 23, 2005 (aged 20)	1	0	(United States Soccer Federation) Marquette Golden Eagles
11	FW	Anicka Castañeda	December 16, 1999 (aged 25)	41	11	(Philippine Football Federation) Kaya–Iloilo
14	FW	Meryll Serrano	July 20, 1997 (aged 28)	26	9	(Norwegian Football Federation) Haugesund
17	FW	Nina Mathelus	September 12, 2008 (aged 17)	8	1	(United States Soccer Federation) Thayer Academy
21	FW	Mallie Ramirez	September 1, 2004 (aged 21)	0	0	(United States Soccer Federation) UNLV Rebels

Group play

Pos	Team	Pld	W	D	L	GF	GA	GD	Pts	Qualification
1	Vietnam	3	2	0	1	9	1	+8	6	Advance to knockout stage
2	Philippines	3	2	0	1	8	2	+6	6	Advance to knockout stage
3	Myanmar	3	2	0	1	5	3	+2	6	
4	Malaysia	3	0	0	3	0	16	−16	0	

Source: Soccerway
5 December 2025
16:00

Myanmar	2–1	Philippines
Win Theingi Tun 4'; May Htet Lu 89'	Report	Ramirez 69'

IPE Chonburi Stadium, Chonburi
Referee: Sunita Thongthawin (Thailand)
8 December 2025
18:30

Philippines	1–0	Vietnam
Ramirez 90+4'	Report

Chonburi Stadium, Chonburi
Referee: Gulshoda Saidqulova (Uzbekistan)
11 December 2025
16:00

Philippines	6–0	Malaysia
Pino 45', 53', 70' (pen.); Cowart 68'; Markey 85'; Castañeda 90+6'	Report

IPE Chonburi Stadium, Chonburi
Referee: Sunita Thongthawin (Thailand)

Knockout stage

14 December 2025
18:30

Thailand	1–1 (a.e.t.)	Philippines
Jiraporn 53'	Report	Guy 87' (pen.)
Penalties
Jiraporn (penalty scored); Taneekarn (penalty scored); Pluemjai (penalty missed); Orapin (penalty missed)	2–4	(penalty scored) Guy; (penalty scored) Carpio; (penalty scored) Eggesvik; (penalty scored) Long

Chonburi Stadium, Chonburi
Referee: Esra'a Almbaidin (Jordan)

Gold medal match

17 December 2025
19:30

Philippines	0–0 (a.e.t.)	Vietnam
	Report
Penalties
Guy (penalty scored); Pino (penalty scored); Long (penalty scored); Beard (penalty scored); Markey (penalty scored); Sawicki (penalty scored)	6–5	(penalty scored) Huỳnh Như; (penalty scored) Ngọc Minh Chuyên; (penalty scored) Nguyễn Thị Trúc Hương; (penalty scored) Hoàng Thị Loan; (penalty scored) Cù Thị Huỳnh Như; (penalty missed) Trần Thị Thu

Chonburi Stadium, Chonburi
Referee: Rebecca Durcau (Australia)

== Futsal ==
The Philippines will compete in women's futsal.

Summary

Key:

- A.E.T – After extra time.
- P – Match decided by penalty-shootout.

Team	Event	Group Stage			Semifinal	Final / BM	
Team	Event	Opposition Score	Opposition Score	Rank	Opposition Score	Opposition Score	Rank
Philippines women's	Women's tournament	Thailand; L 1–7	Malaysia; W 3–1	2 Q	Vietnam; L 0–1	Thailand; L 5–0	4

== Golf ==
Athlete	Event	Round 1	Round 2	Round 3	Round 4	Total		
Athlete	Event	Score	Score	Score	Score	Score	To Par	Rank
Rolando Bregente	Men's Individual	65	73	74	72	284	−4	5
Chris John Remata	Men's Individual	78	70	69	80	297	+9	17
Perry Josef Bucay	Men's Individual	78	75	73	76	302	+14	22
Shinichi Suzuki	Men's Individual	78	82	77	RTD	Did not finish		
Rolando Bregente; Chris John Remata; Perry Josef Bucay; Shinichi Suzuki	Men's Team	221	218	216	228	831	+19	6
Rianne Malixi	Women's Individual	70	79	78	70	297	+9	6
Junia Louise Gabasa	Women's Individual	79	77	73	77	306	+18	13
Grace Pauline Quintanilla	Women's Individual	82	79	77	71	309	+21	15
Rianne Malixi; Junia Louise Gabasa; Grace Pauline Quintanilla	Women's Team	149	156	150	141	596	+20	4

== Gymnastics ==
The Philippines are expected to compete in gymnastics. A notable absence was Olympic double gold medallist Carlos Yulo, who withdrew after the organizers ruled that an athlete can only compete in one apparatus.

=== Artistic ===
Men's

Athlete	Event	Qualification								Final							
Athlete	Event	Apparatus						Total	Rank	Apparatus						Total	Rank
Athlete	Event	F	PH	R	V	PB	HB	Total	Rank	F	PH	R	V	PB	HB	Total	Rank
Miguel Besana	Vault	—N/a			13.900	—N/a		13.900	3	Did not advance							
Miguel Besana	Parallel bars	—N/a				11.667	—N/a	11.667	3 Q	—N/a				11.133	—N/a	11.133	6
Miguel Besana	Horizontal bar	—N/a					11.000	11.000	5 Q	—N/a					12.833	12.833	4
John Ivan Cruz	Floor	12.800	—N/a					12.800	5	Did not advance							
John Ivan Cruz	Vault	—N/a			13.767	—N/a		13.767	2 Q	—N/a			13.833	—N/a		13.833	1st place, gold medalist(s)
Justine Ace de Leon	Floor	13.333	—N/a					13.333	2 Q	12.500	—N/a					12.500	3rd place, bronze medalist(s)
Justine Ace de Leon	Rings	—N/a		12.333	—N/a			12.333	4 Q	—N/a		12.700	—N/a			12.700	3rd place, bronze medalist(s)
Jhon Santillan	Pommel horse	—N/a	10.100	—N/a				10.100	5 Q	—N/a	10.367	—N/a				10.367	5
Jhon Santillan	Horizontal bar	—N/a					10.667	10.667	7	Did not advance							

Women's

Athlete	Event	Qualification						Final					
Athlete	Event	Apparatus				Total	Rank	Apparatus				Total	Rank
Athlete	Event	V	UB	B	F	Total	Rank	V	UB	B	F	Total	Rank
Aleah Finnegan	Vault	12.750	—N/a			12.750	1 Q	13.433	—N/a			13.433	1st place, gold medalist(s)
Aleah Finnegan	Balance beam	—N/a		12.750	—N/a	12.750	1 Q	—N/a		12.467	—N/a	12.467	3rd place, bronze medalist(s)
Aleah Finnegan	Floor	—N/a			12.650	12.650	2 q	—N/a					
Haylee Garcia	Vault	12.425	—N/a			12.425	5	Did not advance					
Haylee Garcia	Uneven bars	—N/a	12.100	—N/a		12.100	2 Q	—N/a	12.233	—N/a		12.233	2nd place, silver medalist(s)
Elaiza Yulo	Balance beam	—N/a		9.450	—N/a	9.450	11	Did not advance					
Elaiza Yulo	Floor	—N/a			11.200	11.200	8	—N/a			11.167	11.167	6

== Handball ==
The Philippines will send a men's and women's indoor handball national teams composed of players from beach handball.

Team	Event	Group Stage						Semifinals	Final	
Team	Event	Opposition Score	Opposition Score	Opposition Score	Opposition Score	Opposition Score	Rank	Opposition Score	Opposition Score	Rank
Philippines men's	Men's tournament	Vietnam; L 25–27	Malaysia; W 24–23	Singapore; L 23–24	Indonesia; L 26–27	Thailand; L 18–37	5	Did not advance		
Philippines women's	Women's tournament	Vietnam; L 12–37	Thailand; L 10–32	Singapore; L 14–26	—N/a		4 Q	Vietnam; L 8–28	Did not advance	3rd place, bronze medalist(s)

== Hockey5s ==
Team	Event	Preliminary round				Semifinals	Final	
Team	Event	Opposition Score	Opposition Score	Opposition Score	Rank	Opposition Score	Opposition Score	Rank
Philippines men's	Men's tournament	Thailand; L 0–11	Malaysia; L 0–18	Indonesia; L 0–15	4 Q	Malaysia; L 1–10	Did not advance	3rd place, bronze medalist(s)
Philippines women's	Women's tournament	Thailand; L 0–9	Malaysia; L 0–13	Indonesia; L 0–7	4 Q	Malaysia; L 0–7	Did not advance	3rd place, bronze medalist(s)

=== Men's ===
Preliminaries

Pos	Team	Pld	W	D	L	GF	GA	GD	Pts	Qualification
1	Malaysia	3	3	0	0	31	3	+28	9	Semi-finals
2	Thailand (H)	3	2	0	1	16	10	+6	6	Semi-finals
3	Indonesia	3	1	0	2	18	8	+10	3	Semi-finals
4	Philippines	3	0	0	3	0	44	−44	0	Semi-finals

Updated to match(es) played on 7 December 2025. Source: FIH
Rules for classification: 1) points; 2) matches won; 3) goal difference; 4) goals for; 5) head-to-head result; 6) field goals for.
(H) Hosts

7 December 2025
10:00

Philippines	0–11	Thailand
	Report	Mahawak 1', 7', 13', 17'; Namkhot; 5', 26', 27'; Kasonbua 6', 22', 29'; Yotsiri 30'

7 December 2025
16:00

Malaysia	18–0	Philippines
	Report

8 December 2025
12:00

Indonesia	15–0	Philippines
	Report

Semifinals

10 December 2025
09:00

Malaysia	10–1	Philippines
	Report

=== Women's ===
Preliminaries

All times are Indochina Time (UTC+07:00)

Pos	Team	Pld	W	D	L	GF	GA	GD	Pts	Qualification
1	Malaysia	3	3	0	0	25	5	+20	9	Semifinals
2	Thailand	3	2	0	1	17	9	+8	6	Semifinals
3	Indonesia	3	1	0	2	12	11	+1	3	Semifinals
4	Philippines	3	0	0	3	0	29	−29	0	Semifinals

Source: 2025 SEA Games
Rules for classification: 1) points; 2) matches won; 3) goal difference; 4) goals for; 5) head-to-head result; 6) field goals for.

7 December 2025
14:00

Philippines	0–9	Thailand
	Report

8 December 2025
11:00

Philippines	0–13	Malaysia
	Report

8 December 2025
16:00

Philippines	0–7	Indonesia
	Report

Semifinals

10 December 2025
11:00

Malaysia	7–0	Philippines
	Report

== Ice hockey ==
Team	Event	Preliminary round					Semifinal	Final	
Team	Event	Opposition Score	Opposition Score	Opposition Score	Opposition Score	Rank	Opposition Score	Opposition Score	Rank
Philippine men's	Men's Tournament	Malaysia; W 7–2	Indonesia; L 1–5	Singapore; W 4–7	Thailand; L 0–8	3 Q	Thailand; L 1–8	Singapore; W 5–3	3rd place, bronze medalist(s)
Philippine women's	Women's Tournament	Thailand; L 0–13	Singapore; W 3–1	Malaysia; W 8–0	—N/a	1 Q	Singapore; W 6–2	Thailand; L 4–13	2nd place, silver medalist(s)

== Indoor hockey ==
Team	Event	Preliminary round					Semifinal	Final	
Team	Event	Opposition Score	Opposition Score	Opposition Score	Opposition Score	Rank	Opposition Score	Opposition Score	Rank
Philippines men's	Men's Tournament	Thailand; L 0–11	Malaysia; L 0–13	Singapore; L 1–8	Indonesia; L 0–17	5	Did not advance		
Philippines women's	Women's Tournament	Indonesia; L 0–7	Thailand; L 0–7	Malaysia; L 1–2	Singapore; L 0–2	5	Did not advance		

== Jet Skiing ==
Athlete	Event	Final					
Athlete	Event	Round 1	Round 2	Round 3	Round 4	Total	Rank
Marchael Louie Buhisan	Mixed Endurance Open	360	368	368	—N/a	1096	3rd place, bronze medalist(s)
Sabino Czar Manglicmot IV	Mixed Endurance Open	348	348	348	—N/a	1044	6
Kristine Kate Mercado	Mixed Runabout 1100 Stock	48	53	53	60	214	2nd place, silver medalist(s)
Anton Nicolas Ignacio	Mixed Runabout 1100 Stock	53	48	43	43	187	3rd place, bronze medalist(s)
Marchael Louie Buhisan	Mixed Runabout Limited	43	36	36	0	115	6
Angelo Inigo Ventus	Mixed Runabout Limited	53	48	53	48	202	3rd place, bronze medalist(s)
Angelo Inigo Ventus	Mixed Runabout Stock	43	30	36	0	109	8
Felix Pontino Jr.	Mixed Ski 1500 Stock	53	53	48	48	202	2nd place, silver medalist(s)
Cody Lorenzo Pontino	Mixed Ski 1500 Stock	43	43	53	43	182	4
Felix Pontino Jr.	Mixed Ski GP	48	48	48	48	202	3rd place, bronze medalist(s)
Cody Lorenzo Pontino	Mixed Ski GP	39	43	43	43	168	4

== Judo ==
Combat

Athlete	Event	Preliminary		Quarterfinals	Semifinals	Repechage	Final	
Athlete	Event	Opposition Score	Opposition Score	Opposition Score	Opposition Score	Opposition Score	Opposition Score	Rank
Daryl John Mercado	Men's –55 kg	—N/a		Htike (MYA); W	Nguyễn H.T. (VIE); L	Mohd Faizal (MAS); W	—N/a	3rd place, bronze medalist(s)
Gabriel Benedict Quitain	Men's 66–73 kg	—N/a		Bye	Nguyễn H.B. (VIE); W	—N/a	Terada (THA); L	2nd place, silver medalist(s)
John Viron Ferrer	Men's 73–81 kg	—N/a		Thant (MYA); W	Kanchu (THA); W	—N/a	Abdul Majeed (MAS); L	2nd place, silver medalist(s)
Rhyan Zarchie Garay	Men's 81–90 kg	—N/a		Kyaw (MYA); W	Dharma (INA); L	Lê (VIE); L	Did not advance	
Chino Sy Tancontian	Men's 90–100 kg	—N/a		Vongphachanh (LAO); W	Hantratin (THA); W	—N/a	Soethama (INA); W	1st place, gold medalist(s)
Joemari-Heart Rafael	Women's 52–57 kg	—N/a		Nguyễn T.T.T (VIE); W	Akkajan (THA); W	—N/a	Febriany (INA); L	2nd place, silver medalist(s)
Khrizzie Pabulayan	Women's 63–70 kg	—N/a		Lê H.T.V. (VIE); L	Phyo (MYA); W	Zhen (SGP); W	—N/a	3rd place, bronze medalist(s)
Margaret Fajardo	Women's 70–78 kg	Oeda (THA); W	Lương (VIE); L	Did not advance				
Maxine Denise Mababangloob	Women's +78 kg	—N/a		Izzatul (MAS); L	—N/a	Dương T.T. (VIE); L	Did not advance	
Philippines	Mixed Team	—N/a		Indonesia; W	Myanmar; W	—N/a	Thailand; W	1st place, gold medalist(s)

=== Kata ===
Athlete	Event	Preliminary round		Final	Rank
Athlete	Event	Total	Rank	Total	Rank
Bryn Quillotes; Alvin Mendoza	Men's Nage-no-kata	362.5	3	Did not advance	
Ma. Jeanalane Lopez; Leah Jhane Lopez	Women's Ju-no-kata	370.5	2Q	374.5	3rd place, bronze medalist(s)

== Jujitsu ==
=== Duo Classic ===
Athlete	Event	Preliminary round		Final	Rank
Athlete	Event	Total	Rank	Total	Rank
Asnawi Dimaporo; Ric Maanao	Men's Duo Show	41.5	6Q	Did not advance	
Ivann Patrick Gurrobat; Ian PatrickGurrobat	Men's Duo Show	40.0	7Q	Did not advance	
Asnawi Dimaporo; Ric Maanao	Men's Duo Classic	—N/a		–	5
Isaiah Miguel Licera; Maddox Pudan	Men's Duo Classic	—N/a		–	6
Janah Jade Lavador; Jayson Cayari	Mixed Duo show	40	5	Did not advance	
Isaiah Miguel Licera; Mariane Mariano	Mixed Duo Classic	87	6Q	–	5
Ric Maanao; Baby Jhen Buzon	Mixed Duo Classic	102	5Q	–	6
Charmea Quelino; Helen Aclopen	Women's Duo Show	40.5	5	Did not advance	
Jenalyn Desulat; Joanna Marie Julaya	Women's Duo Show	38	6	Did not advance	
Baby Jhen Buzon; Mariane Mariano	Women's Duo Classic	—N/a		–	3rd place, bronze medalist(s)
Raesee Margarette Reyes; Mylene Pinkinhan	Women's Duo Classic	—N/a		–	6

=== Fighting ===
Athlete	Event	Preliminary		Round of 16	Quarterfinals	Semifinals	Repechage 1	Repechage 2	Final / BM	
Athlete	Event	Opposition Result	Opposition Result	Opposition Result	Opposition Result	Opposition Result	Opposition Result	Opposition Result	Opposition Result	Rank
Godwin Langbayan	Men's Fighting - 62kg	—N/a			Lê K. (VIE); L 14–14	Did not advance	Vilayphone (LAO); W 0–0	—N/a	Del Rosario (PHI); W 50–0	3rd place, bronze medalist(s)
Rajae Dwight Del Rosario	Men's Fighting - 62kg	—N/a			Sophanuth (CAM); W 0–0	Mathupan (THA); L 0–50	—N/a		Langbayan (PHI); L 0–50	4
Israfil Palabay	Men's Fighting - 77kg	—N/a		Aunjai (THA); L 0–50	Did not advance		Claravall (PHI); L 0–0	Did not advance		
Elijah Philippe Claravall	Men's Fighting - 77kg	—N/a		Bye	Perfecto (SGP); L 7–13	Did not advance	Palabay (PHI); W 0–0	Polput (THA); L 0–0	Did not advance	
Francesca Ella Nepomuceno	Women's Fighting - 52kg	—N/a		Singchalad (THA); L 0–50	Did not advance		Sugun (THA); L 0–0	Did not advance		
Baby Jhen Buzon	Women's Fighting - 52kg	—N/a		Bye	Phụng (VIE); L 0–50	Did not advance	—N/a	Sugun (THA); L 0–0	Did not advance	
Maria Elita Kerr	Women's Fighting - 63kg	Leakkhew (THA); L 0–50	Hà (VIE); L 0–50	Did not advance						

Ne-waza

Athlete	Event	Round of 16	Quarterfinals	Semifinals	Repechage 1	Repechage 2	Final / BM	
Athlete	Event	Opposition Result	Opposition Result	Opposition Result	Opposition Result	Opposition Result	Opposition Result	Rank
Myron Myles MangubatSuwijak Kuntong	Men's Ne-waza - 62kg	Kuntong (THA); L 0–5	Did not advance		Nay (MYA); L 0–0	Did not advance		
Santino Luis Luzuriaga	Men's Ne-waza - 62kg	Đào (VIE); W 0–0	Nay (MYA); W 0–0	Mathupan (THA); L 0–2	—N/a		Thew (MAS); W 50–0	3rd place, bronze medalist(s)
Marc Alexander Lim	Men's Ne-waza - 69kg	Lim (SGP); W 0–0	Hasdee (THA); L 0–50	Did not advance	—N/a	Yee (MAS); W 5–2	Soonthorn (THA); W –	3rd place, bronze medalist(s)
Yman Xavier Baluyo	Men's Ne-waza - 69kg	Bye	Willy (INA); W 0–0	Sarin Soonthorn (THA); W 2–0	—N/a		Đặng (VIE); L 0–5	2nd place, silver medalist(s)
Gerard Gallos	Men's Ne-waza - 77kg	Nguyễn T.L. (VIE); L 0–0	Did not advance		Nguyễn (VIE); L –	Did not advance		
Rian Paulo Serranilla	Men's Ne-waza - 77kg	Chua (SGP); L 0–2	Did not advance					
Michael Dean Roxas	Men's Ne-waza - 85kg	Bye	Sugiri (VIE); W 2–0	Fikri (INA); W 50–0	—N/a		Aacus (SGP); W 50–0	1st place, gold medalist(s)
Vito Luis Luzuriaga	Men's Ne-waza - 85kg	Bye	Phạm (VIE); W 2–0	Aacus (SGP); L 0–50	Did not advance			3rd place, bronze medalist(s)
Kimberly Anne Custodio	Women's Ne-waza - 48kg	MaPhạm (VIE); W 2–0	Putri (INA); W 50–0	Tan (THA); W 0–0	—N/a		Sugun (THA); W 3–0	1st place, gold medalist(s)
Jollirine Co	Women's Ne-waza - 48kg	Bye	Hong (SGP); L 2–2	Did not advance				
Kaila Napolis	Women's Ne-waza - 57kg	Trần (VIE); W 2–0	Singchalad (THA); L 0–0	Did not advance				3rd place, bronze medalist(s)
Annie Ramirez	Women's Ne-waza - 57kg	Bye	Sirimak (PHI); W 50–0	Wong (MAS); L –	Did not advance			
Anna Angelica Mitra	Women's Ne-waza - 63kg	Megawati (INA); L 0–50	Did not advance					
Andrea Lois Lao	Women's Ne-waza - 63kg	Bye	Ee (SGP); W 0–0	Orapa (THA); L 0–0	Did not advance			3rd place, bronze medalist(s)

== Karate ==
Athlete	Event	Round of 16	Quarterfinals	Semifinals/Repechage	Final/BM	
Athlete	Event	Opposition Score	Opposition Score	Opposition Score	Opposition Score	Rank
Kirk Zamayla	Men's –55 kg	—N/a	Chanphet (THA); L 0–2	Did not advance		
John Christian Lachica	Men's –60 kg	—N/a	Chanthavixay (LAO); W 8–0	Dahlan (BRU); W 4–3	Muekthong (THA); L 0–1	2nd place, silver medalist(s)
John Matthew Manantan	Men's –67 kg	Bye	Arlendi (INA); W 4–4	Chanchang (THA); L 1–1	Chua (SGP); W 2–1	3rd place, bronze medalist(s)
Alwyn Batican	Men's –75 kg	—N/a	Muntaen (THA); W 2–1	Kandou (INA); L 2–6	Tang (SGP); L 7–8	3rd place, bronze medalist(s)
Marie June Adriano	Women’s –50 kg	—N/a	Bye	Htun (MYA); L 3–8	Marques (TLS); W 13–3	3rd place, bronze medalist(s)
Maryanne Jenelle Montalvo	Women’s –55 kg	Bye	Hafezan (SGP); L 0–7	Did not advance	Sysoubanthong (LAO); W 5–2	3rd place, bronze medalist(s)
Joanne Denise Lumbao	Women’s –61 kg	Bye	Butsuwan (THA); L 2–7	Did not advance		
John Matthew Manantan; Sharief Afif; John Christian Lachica; Ray Carlo Silva; Richelieu Felipe; Daniel James Deblois; Alwyn Batican	Men’s Kumite Team	—N/a	Brunei (BRU); W 0–0	Thailand (THA); L 21–35	Did not advance	3rd place, bronze medalist(s)
Felix Calipusan Jr. Jodan Macalipay; Jeremy Laurence Nopre	Men’s Kata Team	—N/a	Thailand (THA); L	Did not advance	Myanmar (MYA); W 22.6–21.5	3rd place, bronze medalist(s)
Maryanne Jenelle Montalvo; Marie June Adriano; Florence Edith Mesana; Joan Denise Lumbao	Women’s Kumite Team	—N/a	Indonesia (INA); L 0–2	Did not advance		
Lanyfer Joy Minano; Rebecca Cyril Torres; Allison Kyle Quiroga; Samantha Emmanuelle Veguillas	Women’s Kata Team	—N/a	Indonesia (INA); L	Did not advance		

== Kickboxing ==
Athlete	Event	Quarterfinals	Semifinals	Final	
Athlete	Event	Opposition Score	Opposition Score	Opposition Score	Rank
Mikko Camingawan	Men's Ring: Full Contact 57kg	Tun (MYA); W 3–0	Nguyễn (VIE); L 0–2	Did not advance	3rd place, bronze medalist(s)
Jomar Balangui	Men's Ring: K–1 60kg	Bye	Lumbanbatu (INA); L 1–2	Did not advance	3rd place, bronze medalist(s)
Jansen Pareja	Men's Ring: Low Kick 51kg	Hutapea (INA); W 3–0	Phrommakhot (PHI); L 0–2	Did not advance	3rd place, bronze medalist(s)
Whinny Bayawon	Men's Tatami: Kick Light 57kg	Aziz (INA); W 2–1	Ooi (MAS); W 2–1	Berrie (THA); L 0–3	2nd place, silver medalist(s)
Airon Lance Villamer	Men's Tatami: Point Fighting 63kg	Sitepu (INA); L 3–13	Did not advance		
Renalyn Dacquel	Women's Ring: K–1 52kg	Bye	Rattanaphon (THA); L 0–3	Did not advance	3rd place, bronze medalist(s)
Zyra Bon-as	Women's Ring: Low Kick 48kg	Bye	Bùi (VIE); W 2–1	Jantakarn Manoban (THA); W 2–1	1st place, gold medalist(s)
Fitzchel Martine Fermato	Women's Tatami: Point Fighting 50kg	Lin (VIE); L 1–11	Did not advance		

== Modern Pentathlon ==
Athlete	Event	Final		
Athlete	Event	Time	Points	Rank
Melvin Sacay	Men's Laser Run	10.41.55	659	1st place, gold medalist(s)
Kylle Aldrich Vilos	Men's Laser Run	12.38.51	542	7
Melvin Sacay	Men's Obstacle Laser Run	—N/a	1014	2nd place, silver medalist(s)
Samuel German	Men's Obstacle Laser Run	—N/a	1025	1st place, gold medalist(s)
Michael Ver Anton Comaling	Men's Triathle (Laser, Shoothing, Running)	14.10.17	—N/a	1st place, gold medalist(s)
Joseph Anthony Godbout	Men's Triathle (Laser, Shoothing, Running)	16.01.56	—N/a	5
Princess Honey Arbilon	Women's Laser Run	13.29.32	491	2nd place, silver medalist(s)
Juliana Shane Sevilla	Women's Laser Run	13.57.66	463	7DQ
Shyra Mae Aranzado	Women's Obstacle Laser Run	—N/a	350	6
Juliana Shane Sevilla	Women's Obstacle Laser Run	—N/a	805	3rd place, bronze medalist(s)
Shyra Mae Aranzado	Women's Triathle (Laser, Shoothing, Running)	18.29.30	—N/a	3rd place, bronze medalist(s)
Princess Honey Arbilon	Women's Triathle (Laser, Shoothing, Running)	16.46.16	—N/a	6DQ

== Muaythai ==
=== Combat ===
Athlete	Event	Quarterfinals	Semifinals	Final	
Athlete	Event	Opposition Score	Opposition Score	Opposition Score	Rank
Tyron Jamborillo	Men's Pinweight (45kg)	—N/a	Saw (MYA); W WP30	Saladkaew (THA); L WP10	2nd place, silver medalist(s)
Jan Brix Ramiscal	Men's Light Flyweight (48kg)	Bye	Dương (VIE); L WP30	Did not advance	3rd place, bronze medalist(s)
LJ Rafael Yasay	Men's Flyweight (51kg)	Chembone (LAO); W WP30	Minindi (THA); W WP29	Rumijam (MAS); W WP10	1st place, gold medalist(s)
Mark Jeremy Balmoris	Men's Bantamweight (54kg)	Bye	Rumijam (MAS); L KOB20	Did not advance	3rd place, bronze medalist(s)
Ariel Lee Lampacan	Men's Featherweight (57kg)	Zulfikar (MAS); L WP29	Did not advance		
Ejay Galendez	Men's Lightweight (60kg)	Bye	Taipanyavong (LAO); L RSCH0	Did not advance	3rd place, bronze medalist(s)
Kim Ryan Asense	Men's Light Welterweight (63.5kg)	Phạm (VIE); L WP30	Did not advance		
Matthew Blane Comicho	Men's Welterweight (67kg)	—N/a	Thingnamrob (THA); L RSCB10	Did not advance	3rd place, bronze medalist(s)
Islay Erika Bomogao	Women's Pinweight (45kg)	—N/a	Hoàng (VIE); W DQ20	Noon-Eiad (THA); W WP29	1st place, gold medalist(s)
Rudzma Abubakar	Women's Light Flyweight (48kg)	Gwa (SGP); W WO0	Tangchio (THA); L WP30	Did not advance	3rd place, bronze medalist(s)
Floryvic Montero	Women's Flyweight (51kg)	Bye	Azrilrizal (MAS); L WP29	Did not advance	3rd place, bronze medalist(s)
Alyssa Kylie Mallari	Women's Bantamweight (54kg)	Teo (SGP); L WP30	Did not advance		
Eunicka Kaye Costales	Women's Featherweight (57kg)	Ohmar (MAS); L WP30	Did not advance		

Waikru

Athlete	Event	Preliminary Round			Final	
Athlete	Event	Score	Score	Rank	Total Score	Rank
Phillip Delarmino	Men's waikru	8.94	9.10	3		3rd place, bronze medalist(s)
Islay Erika Bomogao	Women's waikru	9.10	9.10	3		3rd place, bronze medalist(s)

== Netball ==
Team	Group Stage					Final / BM	
Team	Opposition Score	Opposition Score	Opposition Score	Opposition Score	Rank	Opposition Score	Rank
Philippines women's	Singapore; L 22–70	Thailand; L 34–64	Malaysia; L 40–52	Brunei; W 51–48	4	Did not advance	3rd place, bronze medalist(s)

Pos	Team	Pld	W	D	L	GF	GA	GD	Pts	Qualification
1	Singapore	4	4	0	0	286	148	+138	8	Final
2	Malaysia	4	3	0	1	248	183	+65	6	Final
3	Thailand (H)	4	2	0	2	235	205	+30	4	Bronze medal
4	Philippines	4	1	0	3	147	234	−87	2	Bronze medal
5	Brunei	4	0	0	4	141	287	−146	0	

Updated to match(es) played on 16 December 2025. Source: 2025 SEA Games
(H) Hosts

Preliminary round

12 December 2025; 17:00	Report	Philippines	22–70	Singapore	Chantana Yingyong Stadium, Bangkok
12 December 2025; 17:00	Report	Scoring by quarter: 2–20, 8–17, 8–14, 4–19			Chantana Yingyong Stadium, Bangkok

13 December 2025; 15:00	Report	Philippines	34–64	Thailand	Chantana Yingyong Stadium, Bangkok
13 December 2025; 15:00	Report	Scoring by quarter: 11–15, 10–16, 6–18, 7–15			Chantana Yingyong Stadium, Bangkok

14 December 2025; 17:00	Report	Philippines	40–52	Malaysia	Chantana Yingyong Stadium, Bangkok
14 December 2025; 17:00	Report	Scoring by quarter: 7–16, 9–15, 12–10, 12–11			Chantana Yingyong Stadium, Bangkok

15 December 2025; 17:00	Report	Brunei	48–51	Philippines	Chantana Yingyong Stadium, Bangkok
15 December 2025; 17:00	Report	Scoring by quarter: 17–10, 9–14, 12–11, 10–16			Chantana Yingyong Stadium, Bangkok

== Pencak silat ==
=== Seni ===
Athlete	Event	Round of 16	Quarterfinal	Semifinal	Final	
Athlete	Event	Opposition Score	Opposition Score	Opposition Score	Opposition Score	Rank
Rick-Rod Ortega; Edmar Tacuel; James El Mayagma	Men's Regu	—N/a	Brunei; W 9.930–9.920	Singapore; L 9.930–9.940	Did not advance	3rd place, bronze medalist(s)
Almohaidib Abad	Men's Single Tunggal	Bye	Nay (MYA); W 9.940–9.910	Sadara (THA); L 9.930–9.960	Did not advance	3rd place, bronze medalist(s)
Mary Francine Padios	Women's Single Tunggal	Bye	Hamzah (MAS); L 9.930–9.950	Did not advance		

=== Tanding ===
Athlete	Event	Quarterfinal	Semifinal	Final	
Athlete	Event	Opposition Score	Opposition Score	Opposition Score	Rank
Harold Ralph Ungaya	Men's Class U45 (–45 kg)	Bye	Razali (SIN); L 16–65	Did not advance	3rd place, bronze medalist(s)
Dines Dumaan	Men's Class A (45–50 kg)	Eduk (INA); W 20–37	Did not advance		
Gregmart Benitez	Men's Class C (55–60 kg)	Amzad (MAS); W 40–40	Prasong (INA); L 29–51	Did not advance	3rd place, bronze medalist(s)
Cyrell Covon	Men's Class D (60–65 kg)	Aung (MYA); W 82–60	Mitthasan (THA); L 24–50	Did not advance	3rd place, bronze medalist(s)
Mark James Lacao	Men's Class E (65–70 kg)	Kurnia (INA); L 17–43	Did not advance		
Allimar Campos	Men's Class F (70–75 kg)	Bye	Vũ (VIE); L 75–84	Did not advance	3rd place, bronze medalist(s)
Alvin Campos	Men's Class G (75–80 kg)	Bunchit (THA); L 49–71	Did not advance		
Stephen Suazo	Men's Class I (85–90 kg)	Alauddin (SIN); L 9–12	Did not advance		
Hanna Mae Ibutnande	Women's Class B (50–55 kg)	Bye	Vũ (VIE); L 21–60	Did not advance	3rd place, bronze medalist(s)
Maricel Dela Torre	Women's Class C (55–60 kg)	Lê (VIE); L 16–53	Did not advance		

== Pétanque ==
Athlete	Event	Preliminary Round					Semifinals	Final	
Athlete	Event	Opposition Result	Opposition Result	Opposition Result	Opposition Result	Rank	Opposition Result	Opposition Result	Rank
Alfred Repal	Men's Single	Meekhong (THA); L 4–13	Daud (MAS); L 2–13	—N/a		3	Did not advance		
Jhasfer Camingal; Harry Micutuan	Men's Doubles	Oulamanivong / Viphakon (LAO); W 9–8	Ratchata Khamdee; Thanawan Toosewha (THA); L 3–13	Helmi / Safwan (MAS); W 7–5	Lý / Ngô (VIE); L 0–13	3 Q	Lý / Ngô (VIE); L 3–13	Did not advance	3rd place, bronze medalist(s)
Romel Fuentes; Roger Anajao; Bryan Hortilano	Men's Triples	Harliza / Hidayat / Krisbiantoro (INA); L 2–13	Fakhri / Muqri / Zamrulhisham (MAS); L 3–13	—N/a		3	Did not advance		
Clyde Joy Baria; Ronnel Fuentes	Mixed Doubles	Lại / Trần (VIE); W 10–3	Nantawan Fueangsanit; Sarawut Sriboonpeng (THA); L 0–13	Muenxay / Ounnalom (LAO); W 13–2	—N/a	2Q	Ali / Hakimi (MAS); W 13–8	Nantawan Fueangsanit; Sarawut Sriboonpeng (THA); L 3–13	2nd place, silver medalist(s)
Jefrey Deiro; Nelia Lara; Rogelio Hermosa	Mixed Triples	Manythone / Neuthsavath / Souliya (LAO); L 1–13	Lê / Lê / Phạm (VIE); L 2–13	Shein / Tun / Wai (MYA); W 9–8	—N/a	4Q	Manythone / Neuthsavath / Souliya (LAO); L 2–13	Did not advance	3rd place, bronze medalist(s)
Gina Bacus; Julius Philip Bon; M. Bon	Mixed Triples	Nguyễn / Luân / Lê (VIE); W 8–7	Chamchoi / Fueangsanit / Ganjiang (THA); L 0–13	Asifa / Heriyanto / Suwajianto (INA); W 10–8	—N/a	3Q	Lathsavong / Vongsavath / Xamounty (LAO); L 11–13	Did not advance	3rd place, bronze medalist(s)
Mary Grace Munar	Women's Single	Khaithep (THA); L 8–13	Apriliah (INA); L 7–13	—N/a		5	Did not advance		
Cesiel Domenios; Maria Corazon Soberre	Women's Doubles	Sunitra Phuangyoo / Phantipha Wongchuvej (THA); L 5–8	Alya / Noor (MAS); W 12–4	Nguyễn / Nguyễn (VIE); L 7–13	Sengchanphet / Sisavath (LAO); L 8–12	4Q	Nguyễn / Nguyễn (VIE); L 1–13	Did not advance	3rd place, bronze medalist(s)
April Joy Alarcon; Leonita Isdam; Honeylyn Leonardo	Women's Triples	Johnson / Sahira / Vennice (MAS); L 0–13	Douangmanichanh / Phunthaly / Sengmany / Vongsee (LAO); L 6–7	Choochuay / Kallaya / Thamakord / Wadrongphak (THA); L 8–11	Kim / Thạch / Trịnh / Vũ (VIE); L 7–10	5	Did not advance		

== Polo ==
The Philippines will send a 7-man polo team to compete in the men's 2–4 goals.

Team	Event	Preliminary Round			Semifinals	Final / BM	
Team	Event	Opposition Score	Opposition Score	Rank	Opposition Score	Opposition Score	Rank
Patrick Antonio Cruz; Jose Maria Augusto de Jesus; Robert Esguerra; Stefano Juban; Angelo Licardos; Eduardo Lopez; Juan Xavier Tengco	Mixed 2–4 goals	Indonesia (INA); W 5.5–3	Thailand (THA); L 2.5–4	3 Q	Thailand (THA); L 1.5–11	Malaysia (MAS); L 3.5–7	4

== Rowing ==
Athlete	Event	Preliminary		Final	
Athlete	Event	Time	Rank	Time	Rank
Cris Nievarez	Men's Single Sculls	8:27.130	2Q	8:22.121	3rd place, bronze medalist(s)
Rynjie Peñaredondo; Van Adrian Maxilom	Men's Double Sculls	7:34.007	5Q	7:51.922	3rd place, bronze medalist(s)
Zuriel Sumintac; Edgar Ilas	Men's Lightweight Men's Pair	7:57.461	4Q	8:26.313	4
Kenneth James Lantaong; Daryl Pangntao; Reine Art Poblete; Romnel John Acosta	Men's Lightweight Quadruple Sculls	7:34.716	4Q	7:05.983	4
Joanie Delgaco	Women's Lightweight Single Sculls	9:14.970	2Q	9:14.102	2nd place, silver medalist(s)
Joanie Delgaco; Kristine Paraon	Women's Double Sculls	8:30.154	3Q	08:16.976	1st place, gold medalist(s)
Ayonna Huerto; Kristine Paraon; Feiza Jane Lenton; Amelyn Pagulayan	Women's Quadruple Sculls	8:01.778	5Q	8:26.911	4

== Rugby sevens ==
Team	Event	Preliminary round					Final/BM	
Team	Event	Opposition Score	Opposition Score	Opposition Score	Opposition Score	Rank	Opposition Score	Rank
Philippine men's	Men's Tournament	Malaysia; W 24–5	Laos; W 55–0	Singapore; L 7–10	Thailand; L 10–12	3Q	Malaysia; W 19–14	3rd place, bronze medalist(s)
Philippine women's	Women's Tournament	Malaysia; L 12–24	Thailand; L 0–36	Singapore; W 19–10	Indonesia; W 26–5	3Q	Singapore; L 5–33	4

== Sailing ==
=== Kite boarding ===
Athlete	Event	R1	R2	R3	R4	R5	R6	R7	R8	R9	R10	R11	R12	R13	R14	R15	R16	Total	Nett	Rank
Warner Janoya	Men's Formula Kite	(4.0)	(3.0)	(3.0)	3.0	3.0	3.0	3.0	3.0	3.0	3.0	3.0	3.0	3.0	3.0	3.0	3.0	49.0	39.0	3rd place, bronze medalist(s)

=== Sailing ===
Athlete	Event	R1	R2	R3	R4	R5	R6	R7	R8	R9	R10	Total	Nett	Rank
Mark Adrey Amadeo	Boy's ILCA4	(5.0)	4.0	3.0	4.0	3.0	5.0	2.0	2.0	4.0	—N/a	32.0	27.0	5
Carlstein Jade Dulay	Boy's Optimist	3.0	3.0	(6.0)	2.0	4.0	2.0	4.0	3.0	3.0	3.0	33.0	27.0	4
Daven Balangue	Men's ILCA7	4.0	4.0	5.0	5.0	(6.0)	6.0	4.0	6.0	6.0	4.0	50.0	44.0	6
Emerson Villena; Richly Magsanay; Whok Dimapilis; Rubin Cruz Jr. Janno Dalanon; Bernanrd Floren; Coleen Jem Ferrer; Joel Mejarito; Lester Troy Tayong; Alaiza Mae Hernandez; Ridgely Balladares	Mixed Keelboat SSL47	2	4	4	2	4	3	3	2	—N/a	—N/a	20	—N/a	4
Edgar Villapaña; Jonalyn Parocha	Mixed 470	2.0	(3.0)	3.0	3.0	3.0	3.0	3.0	3.0	1.0	3.0	27.0	24.0	3rd place, bronze medalist(s)
Khim Ashley Albo	Girl's ILCA4	2.0	4.0	4.0	2.0	3.0	(6.0 DSQ)	4.0	4.0	2.0	—N/a	31.0	—N/a	5
Daniela Sophia Mayor	Girl's Optimist	5.0	4.0	2.0	5.0	5.0	4.0	5.0	5.0	1.0	(6.0)	41.0	35.0	5

=== Windsurfing ===
Athlete	Event	R1	R2	R3	R4	R5	R6	R7	R8	R9	R10	R11	R12	R13	R14	R15	R16	Total	Nett	Rank
Dhenver John Castillo	Men's U19 IQFoil	1.0	1.0	1.0	1.0	(5.0 BFD)	(3.0)	2.0	1.0	1.0	2.0	2.0	1.0	(3.0)	2.0	1.0	3.0	30.0	19.0	1st place, gold medalist(s)
John Harold Madrigal	Men's IQFoil	(3.0)	(3.0)	(3.0)	2.0	3.0	3.0	3.0	3.0	3.0	3.0	2.0	2.0	3.0	2.0	3.0	3.0	44.0	35.0	3rd place, bronze medalist(s)
Renz Angelo Amboy	Men's Techno 293 Plus	(4.0)	4.0	3.0	1.0	3.0	2.0	2.0	2.0	2.0	3.0	3.0	2.0	—N/a				44.0	35.0	2nd place, silver medalist(s)
Arrianne Angela Paz	Women's IQFoil	2.0	2.0	2.0	(3.0)	2.0	(3.0)	(3.0)	2.0	2.0	2.0	3.0	3.0	3.0	3.0	3.0	2.0	40.0	31.0	3rd place, bronze medalist(s)

== Sepak takraw ==
=== Hoop ===
Athlete	Event	Preliminary Round		Final	
Athlete	Event	Total	Rank	Total	Rank
John Deryck Diego; Emmanuel Escote; Vince Alyson Torno; Jason Huerte; Ronsited Gabayeron; Marc Kian Jake Fuentes	Men's hoop	660	3Q	710	3rd place, bronze medalist(s)
Jean Marie Sucalit; Rachelle Palomar; Rhea Mae Dela Cruz; Mary Ann Lopez; Abegail Sinogbuhan; Kristine Lapsit	Women's hoop	600	3Q	540	3rd place, bronze medalist(s)

=== Regu ===
Team	Event	Preliminary round					Semifinal	Final	
Team	Event	Opposition Score	Opposition Score	Opposition Score	Opposition Score	Rank	Opposition Score	Opposition Score	Rank
Fritz Gerald Garsola; Vince Alyson Torno; Jom Lerry Rafael; Jerry Loquinario Jr. Reynaldo Asilum Jr. Datu Ken Interino; Mark Joseph Gonzales; Rheyjey Ortouste] Jason Huerte; Ronsited Gabayeron; Welmar Aclan; Marc Kian Jake Fuentes	Men's Team Regu	Myanmar; L 0–3	Malaysia; L 0–3	Singapore; W 3–0	—N/a	3	Did not advance		
Vince Alyson Torno; Jerry Loquinario Jr. Reynaldo Asilum Jr. Mark Joseph Gonzales; Rheyjey Ortouste] Jason Huerte	Men's Quadrant	Thailand; L 0–2	Indonesia; W 2–0	Myanmar; L 0–2	Timor-Leste; W 2–0	3	Did not advance		
Jerry Loquinario Jr. Datu Ken Interino; Ehdrian Ilao; Mary Ann Lopez] Abegail Sinogbuhan; Hearth Makiling	Mixed Quadrant	Indonesia; L 0–2	Thailand; L 0–2	—N/a		3	Did not advance		
Jean Marie Sucalit; Rachelle Palomar; Jhoanna Abulencia; Rhea Mae De La Cruz; Mary Ann Lopez; Joana Bayaca; Abegail Sinogbuhan; Kristal Mae Dahlen; Julie-Rose Orig; Nieva Jane Salon; Hearth Makiling; Kristine Lapsit	Women's Team Regu	Vietnam; L 0–3	Vietnam; L 0–3	—N/a		3	Did not advance		
Jean Marie Sucalit; Rachelle Palomar; Mary Ann Lopez; Abegail Sinogbuhan; Nieva Jane Salon; Kristine Lapsit	Women's Quadrant	Vietnam; L 0–2	Cambodia; W 2–0	Laos; L 0–2	—N/a	3Q	Thailand; L 0–2	Did not advance	3rd place, bronze medalist(s)

== Shooting ==
=== Pistol & rifle ===
Team	Event	Preliminary		Final	
Team	Event	Result	Rank	Result	Rank
Carlo Deniel Valdez	Men's 10m Air Pistol	576-15x	4Q	173.2	5
Michael Angelo Fernandez	Men's 10m Air Pistol	573-10x	9Q	236.1	2nd place, silver medalist(s)
Carlo Deniel Valdez; Michael Angelo Fernandez	Men's 10m Air Pistol Team	—N/a		1715-39x	3rd place, bronze medalist(s)
Michael Angelo Fernandez	Men's 25m Rapid Fire Pistol	551-11x	8	Did not advance	
Juancho Miguel Masecampo	Men's 25m Rapid Fire Pistol	519-6x	14	Did not advance	
Sayidi Lamberto Espiritu Jr.	Men's 25m Rapid Fire Pistol	512-4x	15	Did not advance	
Michael Angelo Fernandez; Juancho Miguel Masecampo; Sayidi Lamberto Espiritu Jr.	Men's 25m Rapid Fire Pistol Team	799-10x	5Q	1652-21x	5
Jayson Valdez	Men's 50m Rifle 3 position	558-13x	15	Did not advance	
Sean Wilfred Ocampo	Men's 50m Rifle 3 position	543-10x	20	Did not advance	
Michael Angelo Fernandez; Franchette Shayne Quiroz	Mixed 10m Air Pistol Team	567-11x	4Q	Champalat / Kulchairattana (THA); L 14–16	4
Jayson Valdez; Amparo Teresa Acuña	Mixed 10m Air Rifle Team	609.4	6Q	Chong / Amos (SGP); L 4–16	4
Franchette Shayne Quiroz	Women's 10m Air Pistol	560-17x	14	Did not advance	
Christine Deanne Valdez	Women's 10m Air Pistol	530-2x	20	Did not advance	
Carol Joy Peñaflorida	Women's 10m Air Pistol	526-2x	21	Did not advance	
Franchette Shayne Quiroz; Christine Deanne Valdez; Carol Joy Peñaflorida	Women's 10m Air Pistol Team	—N/a		1616-21x	7
Amparo Teresa Acuña	Women's 10m Air Rifle	619.2	15	Did not advance	
Denise Basila	Women's 10m Air Rifle	609.4	19	Did not advance	
Venus Lovelyn Tan	Women's 10m Air Rifle	592.5	21	Did not advance	
Amparo Teresa Acuña; Denise Basila; Venus Lovelyn Tan	Women's 10m Air Rifle Team	—N/a		1821.1	7
Franchette Shayne Quiroz	Women's 25m Air Pistol	570-19x	11	Did not advance	
Christine Deanne Valdez	Women's 25m Air Pistol	541-5x	20	Did not advance	
Carol Joy Peñaflorida	Women's 25m Air Pistol	547-8x	18	Did not advance	
Franchette Shayne Quiroz; Christine Deanne Valdez; Carol Joy Peñaflorida	Women's 10m Air Pistol Team	—N/a		1658-32x	7
Amparo Teresa Acuña	Women's 50m Air Rifle 3 Position	571-19x	10	Did not advance	
Denise Basila	Women's 50m Air Rifle 3 Position	543-8x	18	Did not advance	
Venus Lovelyn Tan	Women's 50m Air Rifle 3 Position	543-10x	17	Did not advance	
Amparo Teresa Acuña; Denise Basila; Venus Lovelyn Tan	Women's 50m Rifle 3 Position Team	—N/a		1657-37x	6

=== Practical shooting ===
Team	Event	Preliminary		Final	
Team	Event	Result	Rank	Result	Rank
Gerard Loy	Men's Open Individual	1,006.1128	4Q	1,517.4139	3rd place, bronze medalist(s)
Mark Lester Enojado	Men's Open Individual	979.8279	5Q	1,467.7047	5
Aeron John Lanuza	Men's Production Individual	546.1568	1Q	1,555.2214	3rd place, bronze medalist(s)
Juan Miguel Alisaje	Men's Production Individual	527.6597	3Q	1,520.8828	4
Edcel John Gino	Men's Production Optic Individual	1,095.9472	1Q	1,654.0344	1st place, gold medalist(s)
Paul Bryant Yu	Men's Production Optic Individual	961.0872	5Q	1,405.8070	5
Rolly Nathaniel Tecson	Men's Standard Individual	1,118.4886	1Q	1,680.7889	1st place, gold medalist(s)
Kahlil Adrian Viray	Men's Standard Individual	1,079.0093	2Q	1,625.2256	4
Erin Mattea Micor	Women's Open Individual	927.2355	1Q	1,399.3154	1st place, gold medalist(s)
Knelma Grace Mateo	Women's Open Individual	866.6195	4Q	1,316.5630	4
Evelyn Woods	Women's Production Individual	761.4493	3Q	1,150.9254	2nd place, silver medalist(s)
Rizza Vidallon	Women's Production Individual	685.732	4Q	1,054.0776	5
Genesis Pible	Women's Production Optic Individual	883.7303	1Q	1,293.7900	1st place, gold medalist(s)
Maria Joahna Catalan	Women's Production Optic Individual	681.6458	4Q	1,042.6423	5
Stefanie Kathrene Lee	Men's Standard Individual	728.3651	3Q	1,101.4280	3rd place, bronze medalist(s)
Carlin Eidhie Margaret Pizarro	Men's Standard Individual	722.0646	4Q	1,074.6120	5

=== Shotgun ===
Team	Event	Preliminary		Final	
Team	Event	Result	Rank	Result	Rank
Carlo Lorenzo Baltonado; Richard Gomez; Joaquin Miguel Ancheta	Men's Compak sporting Team	252	3Q	509	3rd place, bronze medalist(s)
Enrique Leandro Enriquez	Men's Skeet	115	2Q	50	2nd place, silver medalist(s)
Paul Brian Rosario	Men's Skeet	108	8	Did not advance	
Erique Paul Apolinario	Men's Skeet	96	11	Did not advance	
Carlo Lorenzo Baltonado; Richard Gomez; Joaquin Miguel Ancheta; Eduardo Angelo Rivilla III	Men's Sporting Clay Team	330	2Q	645	2nd place, silver medalist(s)
Hagen Alexander Topacio	Men's Trap	65	2Q	38	2nd place, silver medalist(s)
Antonio Joseph Javines	Men's Trap	64	8	Did not advance	
Jethro Dionisio	Men's Trap	57	15	Did not advance	
Kyra Birkenstock	Women's Skeet	84	5Q	16	5
Lydia Cuyong	Women's Trap	97+0	7	Did not advance	
Janice Navato	Women's Trap	90	9	Did not advance	
Valerie Levanza	Women's Trap	89	10	Did not advance	

== Short-track speed skating ==
Athlete	Event	Preliminary		Final	
Athlete	Event	Time	Rank	Time	Rank
Peter Groseclose	Men's 500m	42.660	1Q	42.478	1st place, gold medalist(s)
Hans Matthew Buemio	Men's 500m	44.770	3Q	44.770	8
Peter Groseclose	Men's 1500m	2:32.557	1Q	2:26.207	2nd place, silver medalist(s)
Hans Matthew Buemio	Men's 1500m	2:35.093	4qB	2:49.975	8
Peter Groseclose; Hans Matthew Buemio; Jahn Asuncion; Sunphil Zablan	Men's 5000m relay	—N/a		7:59.189	3rd place, bronze medalist(s)
Shaelynn Adrianne Bolos; Hans Matthew Buemio; Xsandrie Viande Guimba; Peter Groseclose	Mixed relay	—N/a		3:18.535	4
Shaelynn Adrianne Bolos	Women's 500m	53.690	4qB	51.631	7
Shaelynn Adrianne Bolos	Women's 1500m	3:01.967	4Q	2:59.824	7
Xsandrie Viande Guimba	Women's 1500m	3:12.116	4qB	3:03.915	9
Shaelynn Adrianne Bolos; Xsandrie Viande Guimba; Ethelmae Jewel Suguitan; Renee Caitlyn Benitez	Women's 3000m relay	—N/a		5:40.632	3rd place, bronze medalist(s)

== Skateboarding ==
Athlete	Event	Preliminary					Final	
Athlete	Event	Round 1	Round 2	Round 3	Score	Rank	Score	Rank
Jericho Francisco Jr.	Men's Park	83.33	83.67	85.48	85.48	1	90.68	1st place, gold medalist(s)
Renzo Mark Feliciano	Men's Street	49.89	30.79	35.76	49.89	5	70.00	5
John Flory Panugalinog	Men's Street	25.48	14.86	37.23	37.23	6	34.52	7
Mazel Paris Alegado	Women's Park	75.76	77.91	78.70	78.70	1	79.72	1st place, gold medalist(s)
Elizabeth Amador	Women's Park	52.82	61.50	61.19	61.50	3	72.03	2nd place, silver medalist(s)
Cindy Lou Serna	Women's Street	21.19	11.92	23.90	23.90	5	60.34	6

== Snooker ==
=== 6 Red Snooker ===
Athlete	Event	Round of 16	Quarterfinals	Semifinals	Final	
Athlete	Event	Opposition Score	Opposition Score	Opposition Score	Opposition Score	Rank
Michael Angelo Mengorio	Men's singles	Krhistanto (INA); W 5–4	Ang (MYA); W 5–4	Danjirakul (THA); L 0–5	Did not advance	3rd place, bronze medalist(s)
Basil Hassan Al-Shajjar	Men's singles	Chan (SGP); L 3–5	Did not advance			
Michael Angelo Mengorio; Basil Hassan Al-Shajjar; Alvin Barbero	Men's Team	—N/a	Bye	Singapore; W 4–2	Malaysia; L 1–4	2nd place, silver medalist(s)

=== Snooker ===
Athlete	Event	Round of 16	Quarterfinals	Semifinals	Final	
Athlete	Event	Opposition Score	Opposition Score	Opposition Score	Opposition Score	Rank
Michael Angelo Mengorio	Men's singles	Lertsattayathorn (THA); L 1–4	Did not advance			
Basil Hassan Al-Shajjar	Men's singles	Ong (SGP); L 3–4	Did not advance			
Michael Angelo Mengorio; Basil Hassan Al-Shajjar; Alvin Barbero	Men's Team	—N/a	Singapore; L 2–3	Did not advance		

== Softball ==
Team	Event	Group Stage					Final / BM	
Team	Event	Opposition Score	Opposition Score	Opposition Score	Opposition Score	Rank	Opposition Score	Rank
Philippines men's	Men's tournament	Malaysia; W 11–1	Thailand; W 12–0	Singapore; L 3–7	—N/a	2Q	Singapore; W 3–0	1st place, gold medalist(s)
Philippines women's	Women's tournament	Singapore; W 2–1	Indonesia; W 11–0	Malaysia; W 11–0	Thailand; W 15–1	1Q	Singapore; W 4–1	1st place, gold medalist(s)

== Sport climbing ==
=== Bouldering ===
Athlete	Event	Preliminary		Final	
Athlete	Event	Score	Rank	Score	Rank
Iman Lorenzo Mora	Men's Bouldering	54.3	9Q	0	8
John Joseph Veloria	Men's Bouldering	34.6	13	Did not advance	
Emmanuel Joshua Tayag	Men's Bouldering	0	16	Did not advance	
Sofielle Prajati Dela Cruz	Women's Bouldering	78.7	4	44.8	3rd place, bronze medalist(s)
Elissa Alexandre Vidal	Women's Bouldering	44.5	11	Did not advance	
Glory Ann Carmel Dizon	Women's Bouldering	19.9	14	Did not advance	

=== Lead ===
Athlete	Event	Preliminary						Final	
Athlete	Event	R1 Score	R1 Rank	R2 Score	R2 Rank	Pts	Rank	Score	Rank
Iman Lorenzo Mora	Men's Lead	20	10	26	8	9.17	9	Did not advance	
John Joseph Veloria	Men's Lead	22+	9	23+	10	9.72	10	Did not advance	
Elissa Alexandre Vidal	Women's Lead	30	10	21	9	9.99	11	Did not advance	
Joanne Ala	Women's Lead	28	12	21	9	10.9	12	Did not advance	
Antonina Isabel Arungayan	Women's Lead	22+	16	8	16	15.49	14	Did not advance	

=== Speed ===
Athlete	Event	Preliminary				Quarterfinals	Semifinals	Final/BM	
Athlete	Event	Lane A	Lane B	Time	Rank	Opposition Time	Opposition Time	Opposition Time	Rank
Juan Miguel Azupardo	Men's Speed	7.58	FALL	7.58	11	Did not advance			
John Forones	Men's Speed	8.49	FALL	8.49	12	Did not advance			
Kevin Pascua	Men's Speed	10.24	10.56	10.24	13	Did not advance			
Kanyanat Arsakit	Women's Speed	9.86	9.97	9.86	7Q	Nurhidayah (INA); L 9.86–7.28	Did not advance		

== Squash ==
=== Men's and Women's ===
Athlete	Event	Round 1	Quarterfinals	Semifinals	Final	
Athlete	Event	Opposition Score	Opposition Score	Opposition Score	Opposition Score	Rank
Reymark Bergonia	Men's singles	—N/a	Yingcharoen (THA); W 3–0	Lee (MAL); L 0–3	Did not advance	3rd place, bronze medalist(s)
David William Pelino	Men's singles	—N/a	Aw (SGP); L 0–3	Did not advance		
Jemyca Aribado	Women's singles	bye	Yattaqi (INA); W 3–0	Yee (MAL); L 0–3	Did not advance	3rd place, bronze medalist(s)
Aerra Relano	Women's singles	Aye (MYA); W 3–0	Yee (MAL); L 0–3	Did not advance		
Christopher Buraga; Jonathan Reyes	Men's jumbo doubles	—N/a	bye	Indonesia (INA); W 2–0	Malaysia (MAL); L 1–2	2nd place, silver medalist(s)

=== Mixed ===
Athlete	Event	Group Stage			Semifinal	Final	
Athlete	Event	Opposition Score	Opposition Score	Rank	Opposition Score	Opposition Score	Rank
Aerra Relano; Jonathan Reyes	Mixed jumbo doubles	Thailand (THA); W 2–0	Malaysia (MAL); W 2–1	1 Q	Indonesia (INA); W 2–1	Malaysia (MAL); L 0–2	2nd place, silver medalist(s)

== Swimming ==
The Philippines will send 11 swimmers (3 males and 8 females) into the SEA Games competition after they qualified thru the national tryouts by the Philippine Aquatics from 22 to 24 August.

=== Men's ===
Athlete	Event	Heats		Final	
Athlete	Event	Time	Rank	Time	Rank
Logan Noguchi	50 backstroke	26.25	4Q	Did not start	
Logan Noguchi	50 butterfly	24.45	5Q	23.97	3rd place, bronze medalist(s)
Logan Noguchi	50 freestyle	23.01	5	22.55	4
Logan Noguchi	100 backstroke	57.27	3Q	56.55	4
Logan Noguchi	100 butterfly	54.62	4Q	53.45	4
Joran Orogo	50 backstroke	26.32	5Q	26.22	5
Joran Orogo	100 backstroke	57.38	5Q	57.33	7
Joran Orogo	50 butterfly	25.21	10R	Did not advance	
Joran Orogo	100 butterfly	57.08	8	56.21	8
Joran Orogo	200 backstroke	2:12.36	10	Did not advance	
Gian Santos	200 freestyle	1:52.13	6Q	1:51.54	8
Gian Santos	200 individual medley	2:07.56	2Q	2:03.88	2nd place, silver medalist(s)
Gian Santos	400 individual medley	—N/a		4:27.59	4

=== Women's ===
Athlete	Event	Heats		Final	
Athlete	Event	Time	Rank	Time	Rank
Kyla Bulaga	200 butterfly	2:21.54	6Q	2:23.05	7
Kyla Bulaga	200 breaststroke	2:43.30	7Q	2:42.20	7
Kyla Bulaga	400 freestyle	4:38.93	7Q	4:38.96	8
Kyla Bulaga	400 individual medley	5:11.84	7	5:08.52	7
Kyla Bulaga	800 freestyle	—N/a		9:30.66	8
Xiandi Chua	100 backstroke	1:04.58	6	DNS	
Xiandi Chua	200 backstroke	2:21.58	2Q	2:15.73	2nd place, silver medalist(s)
Xiandi Chua	200 individual medley	2:19.78	4	2:18.01	5
Xiandi Chua	400 individual medley	5:05.09	5	4:56.11	4
Quendy Fernandez	50 backstroke	29.48	4Q	29.53	6
Chloe Isleta	200 backstroke	2:22.24	3Q	2:18.67	5
Chloe Isleta	200 individual medley	2:22.45	7	2:22.09	6
Jasmine Mojdeh	100 butterfly	1:02.48	5Q	DNS	
Jasmine Mojdeh	200 butterfly	2:19.25	5Q	2:18.01	5
Miranda Renner	50 breaststroke	33.08	7Q	32.44	6
Miranda Renner	50 butterfly	27.29	3Q	26.93	(silver) NR
Miranda Renner	100 butterfly	1:02.65	7	1:02.61	7
Kayla Sanchez	50 backstroke	28.47	1Q GR, NR	28.84	2nd place, silver medalist(s)
Kayla Sanchez	50 freestyle	25.51	1Q	25.15	2nd place, silver medalist(s)
Kayla Sanchez	100 backstroke	1:03.64	4Q	1:02.35	1st place, gold medalist(s)
Kayla Sanchez	100 freestyle	56.00	2Q	54.82	1st place, gold medalist(s)
Kayla Sanchez	200 freestyle	2:05.89	3Q	2:02.19	2nd place, silver medalist(s)
Heather White	50 freestyle	25.84	3Q	25.38	3rd place, bronze medalist(s)
Heather White	100 freestyle	55.89	1Q	55.36	2nd place, silver medalist(s)
Heather White	200 freestyle	2:06.16	5	2:03.51	5
Xiandi Chua; Chloe Isleta; Kayla Sanchez; Heather White	4x100 freestyle relay	—N/a		3:44.26	(gold) NR
Xiandi Chua; Chloe Isleta; Kayla Sanchez; Heather White	4x200 freestyle relay	—N/a		8:11.55	(silver) NR
Xiandi Chua; Jasmine Mojdeh; Miranda Renner; Kayla Sanchez	4x100 medley relay	—N/a		4:09.33	(silver) NR

== Table tennis ==
Team	Event	Preliminary round				Round of 16	Quarterfinals	Semifinal	Final	
Team	Event	Opposition Score	Opposition Score	Opposition Score	Rank	Opposition Score	Opposition Score	Opposition Score	Opposition Score	Rank
Jann Mari Nayre	Men's Singles	Aung (MYA); W 3–0; 11–4, 11–2, 11–6	Nguyễn (VIE); W 3–0; 11–6, 11–6, 12–10	Phakpoom (THA); W 3–0; 11–8, 11–9, 13–11	1Q	—N/a	Negara (INA); L 2–3; 4–11, 11–13 11–8, 11–7, 11–13	Did not advance		
John Russel Misal	Men's Singles	Le (SGP); W 3–0; 11–9, 11–6, 16–14	Negara (INA); L 1–3; 6–11, 7–11 11–6, 7–11	Preechayan (THA); L 1–3; 9–11, 10–12, 11–6, 4–11	3	—N/a	Did not advance			
John Russel Misal; Richard Gonzales	Men's Doubles	—N/a				Nguyễn / Đoàn (VIE); L 1–3; 13–15, 11–6 9–11, 3–11	Did not advance			
Jann Mari Nayre; John Russel Misal; Richard Gonzales; Eljey Dan Tormis; Edouard Aaron Raymond Valenet	Men's Team	Malaysia; L 0–3	Laos; W 3–1	Thailand; W 3–0	2Q	—N/a		Singapore; L 1–3	Did not advance	3rd place, bronze medalist(s)
Angelou Joyce Laude; Eljey Dan Tormis	Mixed Doubles	—N/a				Choong / Dick (MAS); L 1–3; 10–12, 11–9 10–12, 7–11	Did not advance			
Jann Mari Nayre; Kheith Rhynne Cruz	Mixed Doubles	—N/a				Nguyễn A.T. / Nguyễn K.D.K. (VIE); L 0–3; 8–11 5–11, 6–11	Did not advance			
Rose Jean Fadol	Women's Singles	Paranang (THA); L 0–3; 4–11, 6–11, 4–11	Lin (SGP); L 1–3; 7–11, 11–9, 5–11, 8–11	—N/a	3	—N/a	Did not advance			
Kheith Rhynne Cruz	Women's Singles	Naing (MYA); W 3–0; 11–5, 11–2, 11–4	Nguyễn (VIE); W 3–1; 7–11, 11–7, 11–7, 11–3	Aminah (INA); W 3–0; 11–5, 11–9, 11–3	1Q	—N/a	Chang (MAS); L 0–3; 8–11, 11–13 8–11	Did not advance		
Angelou Joyce Laude; Rose Jean Fadol	Women's Doubles	—N/a				Nguyễn / Mai (VIE); L 0–3; 9–11, 5–11, 9–11	Did not advance			
Emy Rose Dael; Sendrina Andrea Balatbat	Women's Doubles	—N/a				Trần / Bùi (VIE); L 2–3; 15–13, 10–12, 11–6, 9–11, 11–13	Did not advance			
Angelou Joyce Laude; Emy Rose Dael; Sendrina Andrea Balatbat; Rose Jean Fadol; Kheith Rhynne Cruz	Women's Team	Thailand; L 0–3	Vietnam; W 3–1	—N/a	2Q	—N/a		Singapore; L 0–3	Did not advance	3rd place, bronze medalist(s)

== Taekwondo ==
=== Poomsae ===
Freestyle

Athlete	Event	Score	Rank
Justin Kobe Macario	Men's individual	8.200	1st place, gold medalist(s)
Juvenile Faye Crisostomo; Justin Kobe Macario; Janna Dominique Oliva; Darius Venerable; Jeus Gabriel Derick Yape	Mixed team	7.580	3rd place, bronze medalist(s)

Recognized

Athlete	Event	Quarterfinals	Semifinals	Final	
Athlete	Event	Opposition Score	Opposition Score	Opposition Score	Rank
King Nash Alcairo; Iam Matthew Corton; Rodolfo Reyes Jr.	Men's team	Singapore (SGP); W 8.630–8.250	Thailand (THA); W 8.610–8.540	Indonesia (INA); L 8.530–8.710	2nd place, silver medalist(s)
Jocel Lyn Ninobla; Patrick King Perez	Mixed pair	Khant; Thuzar (MYA); W 8.440–8.160	Aqitah; Khaw (SGP); L 8.520–8.620	Did not advance	3rd place, bronze medalist(s)

=== Kyorugi ===
Men's

Athlete	Event	Round of 16	Quarterfinals	Semifinals	Final	
Athlete	Event	Opposition Score	Opposition Score	Opposition Score	Opposition Score	Rank
Kurt Bryan Barbosa	54 kg	Bye	Jaichoo (THA); W 2–1	Nguyễn H.T. (VIE); L 1–2	Did not advance	3rd place, bronze medalist(s)
Aljen Aynaga	58 kg	—N/a	Phyo (MYA); W 2–0	Đinh C.K. (VIE); L 1–2	Did not advance	3rd place, bronze medalist(s)
Kenneth Buenavides	63 kg	—N/a	Lê T. (VIE); W 2–0	Sayyaseng (LAO); W 2–0	Fuangnoi (THA); L 0–2	2nd place, silver medalist(s)
Nusair Lao	68 kg	—N/a	Bharat (MAS); W 2–0		Tubtimdang (THA); L 0–2	2nd place, silver medalist(s)
Dave Cea	74 kg	—N/a	Bye	Lý H.P. (VIE); L 1–2	Did not advance	3rd place, bronze medalist(s)

Women's

Athlete	Event	Quarterfinals	Semifinals	Final	
Athlete	Event	Opposition Score	Opposition Score	Opposition Score	Rank
Clarence Sarza	46 kg	Ho (MAS); W 2–0	Prikasih (INA); W 2–0	Poolkerd (THA); L 0–2	2nd place, silver medalist(s)
Tachiana Mangin	49 kg	Djaniguian (LAO); W 2–0	Putri (INA); W 2–0	Seeken (THA); W 2–0	1st place, gold medalist(s)
Jessica Canabal	53 kg	Firdaus (MAS); W 2–0	Nguyễn T.L. (VIE); L 0–2	Did not advance	3rd place, bronze medalist(s)
Merica Chan	62 kg	Bye	Mam (CAM); W WDQ	Tongchan (THA); L 0–2	2nd place, silver medalist(s)
Laila Delo	73 kg	Bye	Sok (CAM); W WDQ	Bạc T.K. (VIE); L 0–2	2nd place, silver medalist(s)

== Tennis ==
=== Men's ===
Athlete	Event	Round 1	Quarterfinals	Semifinals	Final	
Athlete	Event	Opposition Score	Opposition Score	Opposition Score	Opposition Score	Rank
AJ Lim	Singles	Simmalavong (LAO); L 0–2	Did not advance			
Eric Jed Olivarez	Singles	Fitriadi (INA); L 0–2	Did not advance			
Francis Alcantara; Ruben Gonzales Jr.	Doubles	Jimenez; Yasin (SGP); W 2–1	Isaro; Jones (THA); L 0–2	Did not advance		
AJ Lim; Eric Jed Olivarez	Doubles	Nguyễn M.P. Vũ H.M.D. (VIE); W 2–0	Sornlaksup; Trongcharoenchaikul (THA); L 0–2	Did not advance		
Francis Alcantara; Ruben Gonzales Jr. AJ Lim; Eric Jed Olivarez; Arthur Pantilo	Team	—N/a	Singapore (SGP); W 2–1	Indonesia (INA); L 1–2	Did not advance	3rd place, bronze medalist(s)

=== Women's ===
Athlete	Event	Round 1	Quarterfinals	Semifinals	Final	
Athlete	Event	Opposition Score	Opposition Score	Opposition Score	Opposition Score	Rank
Alexandra Eala	Singles	Bye	Leong (MAS); W 2–0	Naklo (THA); W 2–0	Sawangkaew (THA); W 2–0	1st place, gold medalist(s)
Alexa Milliam	Singles	Wan Abdul Rahman (MAS); W 2–0	Tjen (INA); L 0–2	Did not advance		
Stefi Aludo; Tennielle Madis	Doubles	Ngô H.H. Trần T.T.T. (VIE); W 2–0	Naklo; Cheapchandej (THA); L 0–2	Did not advance		
Alexa Milliam; Shaira Rivera	Doubles	Hazli; Yip (MAS); W 2–1	Juntarto; Nugroho (INA); L 0–2	Did not advance		
Stefi Aludo; Alexandra Eala; Tennielle Madis; Alexa Milliam; Shaira Rivera	Team	—N/a	Vietnam (VIE); W 2–1	Thailand (THA); L 0–3	Did not advance	3rd place, bronze medalist(s)

=== Mixed ===
Athlete	Event	Round 1	Quarterfinals	Semifinals	Final	
Athlete	Event	Opposition Score	Opposition Score	Opposition Score	Opposition Score	Rank
Francis Alcantara; Alexandra Eala	Doubles	Bye	Abadia; Choo (SGP); W 2–0	Cheapchandej; Sornlaksup (THA); L 1–2	Did not advance	3rd place, bronze medalist(s)
Ruben Gonzales Jr. Shaira Rivera	Doubles	Alam; Tong (SGP); W 2–0	Isaro; Plipuech (THA); L 0–2	Did not advance		

== Teqball ==
Team	Event	Group stage				Semifinal	Final
Team	Event	Opposition Score	Opposition Score	Opposition Score	Rank	Opposition Score	Rank
Prince Agustin	Men's Singles	Kukeaw (THA); L 0–2; 1–12, 2–12	Hameed (MAS); L 0–2; 7–12, 1–12	—N/a	3	Did not advance	
Dailan Christoffe Montenegro; Anel Pacis Jr.	Men's Doubles	Uba / Mardan (INA); L 0–2; 3–12, 4–12	Keovilaiket / Vilavongsa (LAO); L 1–2; 8–12, 12–11, 7–12	Rakhli / Zukeri (MAS); L 0–2; 8–12, 8–12	4	Did not advance	
Klyde Vincent Polca; Precious Nicole Tabucol	Mixed Doubles	Azwar / Sumaya (INA); L 0–2; 0–12, 1–12	Lattanabounmee / Inthalapheth (LAO); L 1–2; 8–12, 12–4, 9–12	Hidayat / Syafiqah (MAS); L 0–2; 2–12, 5–12	4	Did not advance	
Joellene Nicole Angelic Cruz	Women's Singles	Kuntatong (THA); L 0–2; 1–12, 2–12	Natasha (MAS); L 0–2; 5–12, 5–12	—N/a	3	Did not advance	
Crystal Cherry Carino; Precious Nicole Tabucol	Women's Doubles	Pongbura / Kapito (INA); L 0–2; 1–12, 5–12	Trịnh / Nguyễn (VIE); L 0–2; 2–12, 6–12	Aung / Win (MYA); L 0–2; 0–12, 0–12	4	Did not advance	

== Triathlon ==
=== Aquathlon ===
Athlete	Event	Final	
Athlete	Event	Time	Rank
Inaki Emil Lorbes; Andrew Kim Remolino; Joshua Alexander Ramos	Team 3 Men Relay	00:47:32	3rd place, bronze medalist(s)
Kira Ellis; Erika Nicole Burgos; Kim Mangrobang	Team 3 Women Relay	00:51:46	2nd place, silver medalist(s)
Kira Ellis; Matthew Justin Hermosa; Andrew Kim Remolino; Raven Faith Alcoseba	Team Mixed Relay 2 Men+ 2 Women	01:04:58	2nd place, silver medalist(s)

=== Duathlon ===
Athlete	Event	Time				Final	
Athlete	Event	Athlete 1	Athlete 2	Athlete 3	Athlete 4	Time	Rank
Franklin Ferdie Yee; John Patrick Ciron; Maynard Pecson	Team 3 Men Relay	00:21:49	00:22:37	00:23:27	—N/a	01:07:54	4
Merry Joy Trupa; Erika Nicole Burgos; Kim Mangrobang	Team 3 Women Relay	00:26:28	00:25:41	00:25:41	—N/a	01:17:50	4
Franklin Ferdie Yee; John Patrick Ciron; Merry Joy Trupa; Erika Nicole Burgos	Team Mixed Relay 2 Men+ 2 Women	00:24:48	00:23:03	00:24:26	00:23:18	01:35:35	2nd place, silver medalist(s)

=== Triathlon ===
Athlete	Event	Time						Rank
Athlete	Event	Swim (1.5 km)	Trans 1	Bike (40 km)	Trans 2	Run (10 km)	Total	Rank
Andrew Kim Remolino	Men's Individual	00:09:31	00:00:23	00:27:38	00:00:29	00:17:01	00:55:03	2nd place, silver medalist(s)
Fernando Jose Casares	Men's Individual	00:10:27	00:00:26	00:28:35	00:00:34	00:16:55	00:56:56	3rd place, bronze medalist(s)
Kira Ellis	Women's Individual	00:10:16	00:00:26	00:30:54	00:00:34	00:18:53	01:01:03	2nd place, silver medalist(s)
Raven Faith Alcoseba	Women's Individual	Did not start						
Fernando Jose Casares; Matthew Justin Hermosa; Inaki Emil Lorbes	Men's Team 3 Relay	—N/a					01:04:05	1st place, gold medalist(s)
Fernando Jose Casares; Andrew Kim Remolino; Raven Faith Alcoseba; Kira Ellis	Mixed 2 Men+ 2 Women Relay	—N/a					01:30:31	1st place, gold medalist(s)
Erika Nicole Burgos; Raven Faith Alcoseba; Kim Mangrobang	Women's Team 3 Relay	—N/a					01:10:14	1st place, gold medalist(s)

== Volleyball ==
The Philippines will compete in men's and women's indoor volleyball.

=== Indoor volleyball ===
==== Men's ====
Team	Event	Preliminary round			Semi Finals / PF	Finals / BM / PF	
Team	Event	Opposition Score	Opposition Score	Rank	Opposition Score	Opposition Score	Rank
Philippine Men's	Men's tournament	Myanmar; W 3–0; 25–23, 25–20, 25–21	Indonesia; L 0–3; 17–25, 25–27, 24–26	2 Q	Thailand; L 0-3; 20–25, 19–25, 21–25	Vietnam; W 3–2; 23–25, 23–25, 25–18, 25–22, 16–14	3rd place, bronze medalist(s)

Preliminary Rounds – Group B

Pos	Team	Pld	W	L	Pts	SW	SL	SR	SPW	SPL	SPR	Qualification
1	Indonesia	2	2	0	6	6	0	MAX	153	122	1.254	Semifinals
2	Philippines	2	1	1	3	3	3	1.000	141	142	0.993	Semifinals
3	Myanmar	2	0	2	0	0	6	0.000	120	150	0.800	5th–7th semifinals

Source: SEA Games Thailand 2025

==== Women's ====
Team	Event	Preliminary round			Semi Finals / PF	Finals / BM / PF	
Team	Event	Opposition Score	Opposition Score	Rank	Opposition Score	Opposition Score	Rank
Philippine Women's	Women's tournament	Thailand; L 0–3 11–25, 17–25, 16–25	Singapore; W 3–0 25–13, 25–8, 25–18	2 Q	Vietnam; L 0–3 17–25, 14–25, 17–25	Indonesia; L 1–3 26–28, 25–13, 28–30, 24–26	4

Preliminary Rounds – Group A

Pos	Team	Pld	W	L	Pts	SW	SL	SR	SPW	SPL	SPR	Qualification
1	Thailand (H)	2	2	0	6	6	0	MAX	150	85	1.765	Semifinals
2	Philippines	2	1	1	3	3	3	1.000	119	114	1.044	Semifinals
3	Singapore	2	0	2	0	0	6	0.000	80	150	0.533	5th–7th semifinals

Source: SEA Games Thailand 2025
(H) Host

=== Beach volleyball ===
Team	Event	Preliminary Round						Semifinal/ Classification	Final / BM	
Team	Event	Opposition Score	Opposition Score	Opposition Score	Opposition Score	Opposition Score	Rank	Opposition Score	Opposition Score	Rank
Ronniel Rosales; Rancel Varga; Team A	Men's Beach Volleyball	Vietnam; L 1–2; 21–13, 14–21, 10–15	Laos; W 2–0; 21–15, 21–11	Indonesia; L 0–2; 17–21, 9–21	—N/a		3 C5-6	Singapore; W 2–0; 21–16, 21–18	—N/a	5
Alnakran Abdilla; James Buytrago; Team B	Men's Beach Volleyball	Vietnam; W 2–1; 21–14, 16–21, 15–9; Golden Match; L 1–2; 18–21, 21–18, 11–15	Laos; W 2–0; 21–13, 21–17	Indonesia; W 2–0; 21–21, 21–18; Golden Match; L 17–21, 13–21	—N/a		3 C5-6	Singapore; W 2–0; 21–13, 21–8	—N/a	5
Bernadette Pons; Sisi Rondina; Team A	Women's Beach Volleyball	Indonesia; W 2–1; 21–16, 18–21, 15–10; Golden Match; W 2–1; 15–21, 21–16, 18–16	Singapore; W 2–0; 21–10, 21–6	Malaysia; W 2–0; 21–5, 21–10	Vietnam; W 2–1; 21–18, 15–21, 15–10	Thailand; L 0–2; 12–21, 17–21	2 Final	—N/a	Thailand; W 2–0; 21–17, 21–15	1st place, gold medalist(s)
Dij Rodriguez; Sunnie Villapando; Team B	Women's Beach Volleyball	Indonesia; L 1–2; 21–12, 19–21, 13–15	Singapore; W 2–0; 21–11, 21–8	Malaysia; W 2–0; 21–10, 21–12	Vietnam; W 2–1; 22–20, 19–21,15–10	Thailand; L 0–2; 17–21, 19–21	2 Final	—N/a	Thailand; W 2–1; 21–13, 17–21, 15–6	1st place, gold medalist(s)

== Water skiing and wakeboarding ==
Athlete	Event	Points	Rank	Total	Rank
Ralph Trinidad	Cable Wakeboard Team	80	2	180	3rd place, bronze medalist(s)
Mark Louie Camomot	Cable Wakeboard Team	10	11	180	3rd place, bronze medalist(s)
Derek Hewitt	Cable Wakeboard Team	6	35	180	3rd place, bronze medalist(s)
Franchesca Coo	Cable Wakeboard Team	7	30	180	3rd place, bronze medalist(s)
Andrea Tanjangco	Cable Wakeboard Team	8	25	180	3rd place, bronze medalist(s)
Maritoni Gatchalian	Cable Wakeboard Team	6	35	180	3rd place, bronze medalist(s)
Mark Louie Camomot	Waterski Team	40	7	80	4
Carlo Dela Torre	Waterski Team	40	7	80	4
Maritoni Gatchalian	Waterski Team	40	7	80	4
Susan Madelene Larsson; Eric Ordonez; Jerry Jimenez Jr.	Wake Surf Team	—N/a		112	4
Eva Dela Torre; Derek Hewitt; Mark Griffin; Francheska Mae Coo	Wakeboard Team	—N/a		112	3rd place, bronze medalist(s)

== Weightlifting ==
The Philippines sent nine weightlifters (four men and five women) in the competition.

Men's

Athlete	Event	Snatch					Clean & Jerk					Total	Rank
Athlete	Event	1	2	3	Result	Rank	1	2	3	Result	Rank	Total	Rank
Fernando Agad Jr.	60 kg	~~119~~	119	~~123~~	119	5	150	~~155~~	~~155~~	150	5	269	5
Dave Pacaldo	65 kg	~~125~~	125	~~130~~	125	5	160	165	~~168~~	165	4	290	4
Albert Delos Santos	71 kg	133	136	138	138	2	175	182	186	186	2	324	2nd place, silver medalist(s)
John Tabique	94 kg	145	150	152	152	3	~~184~~	~~184~~	184	184	5	336	4

Women's

Athlete	Event	Snatch					Clean & Jerk					Total	Rank
Athlete	Event	1	2	3	Result	Rank	1	2	3	Result	Rank	Total	Rank
Rosegie Ramos	48 kg	80	~~83~~	83	83	4	~~100~~	~~102~~	~~102~~	—		DNF	
Jhodie Peralta	53 kg	82	85	~~87~~	85	3	100	103	105	105	4	190	4
Hidilyn Diaz	58 kg	88	90	~~92~~	90	4	110	~~115~~	~~116~~	110	4	200	4
Elreen Ando	63 kg	96	98	102	102	1	~~123~~	123	127	127	1	229	1st place, gold medalist(s)
Kristel Macrohon	69 kg	98	100	~~102~~	100	2	~~120~~	~~121~~	121	121	3	221	3rd place, bronze medalist(s)

== Wrestling ==
=== Freestyle ===
Athlete	Event	Preliminary Round					Quarterfinals	Semifinals	Final	
Athlete	Event	Opposition Result	Opposition Result	Opposition Result	Opposition Result	Rank	Opposition Result	Opposition Result	Opposition Result	Rank
Hayden Tyler Jenter Ancheta	Men's 57kg	Abidin (INA); W 3–1	Kaung (MYA); W 5–0	—N/a		1 Q	—N/a	Kaewkhanchum (THA); W 4–1	Phạm (VIE); L 1–3	2nd place, silver medalist(s)
Ronil Tubog	Men's 65kg	—N/a					Lee (SGP); W 4–0	Jumpakam (THA); W 3–1	Nguyễn (VIE); L 0–4	2nd place, silver medalist(s)
Michael Andre Dargani	Men's 74kg	Amaral (TLS); W 5–0	Chamnanjan (THA); L 1–3	Cấn (VIE); L 0–4	Ilhaza (INA); L 1–3	—N/a				3rd place, bronze medalist(s)
Gabriel Thomas Dinette	Men's 86kg	Fariansyah (INA); W 4–1	Trần (VIE); W 5–0	Chamnanjan (THA); W 4–0	Chow (SGP); W 4–0	—N/a				1st place, gold medalist(s)
Aliah Rose Galvez	Women's 50kg	Novita (INA); W 3–0	Yujatturat (THA); W 5–0	Đỗ (VIE); L 0–4	Khaing (MYA); W 4–0	—N/a				2nd place, silver medalist(s)
Rea Grace Cervantes	Women's 53kg	Nguyễn (VIE); L 0–4	Khin (MYA); L 1–3	Ayuningtias (INA); L 0–4	Kaewkhuanchum (THA); W 5–0	—N/a				3rd place, bronze medalist(s)
Arian Geralin Carpio	Women's 53kg	Herlina (INA); W 5–0	Thammavong (LAO); W 5–0	Srisombat (THA); L 1–3	Nguyễn (VIE); L 1–4	—N/a				2nd place, silver medalist(s)

=== Greco-Roman ===
Athlete	Event	Preliminary Round					Semifinals	Final	
Athlete	Event	Opposition Result	Opposition Result	Opposition Result	Opposition Result	Rank	Opposition Result	Opposition Result	Rank
Joe Fer Callado	Men's 67kg	Bùi (VIE); L 0–4	Wana (MYA); W 4–0	Aliansyah (INA); L 0–4	—N/a	3	Did not advance		
Jason Baucas	Men's 77kg	Banyar (MYA); W 4–0	Sulaeman (INA); L 0–5	—N/a		2Q	Nguyễn (VIE); L 0–4	Thamwirat (THA); W 3–1	3rd place, bronze medalist(s)
Runieth Decano	Men's 87kg	Aunthin (THA); L 0–5	Nghiêm (VIE); L 0–4	Saputra (INA); L 0–5	Yang (SGP); L 0–5	—N/a			5
Callum Johnston Roberts	Men's 97kg	Loh (SGP); W 5–0	Ramadhani (INA); L 0–5	—N/a		2Q	Nguyễn (VIE); L 0–4	Baimud (THA); W 3–1	3rd place, bronze medalist(s)

== Wushu ==
=== Changquan - Daoshu - Gunshu ===
Athlete	Event	Final				
Athlete	Event	Changquan	Daoshu	Gunshu	Total	Rank
Mark Lester Ragay	Men's Changquan - Daoshu - Gunshu	9.446	9.723	9.383	28.552	9

=== Duilian Weapon ===
Athlete	Event	Final	
Athlete	Event	Total	Rank
Russel Diaz; Thornton Quieney Lou Sayan; Sandrex Gainsan	Men's Duilian Bare - handed	9.620	4
Mark Lester Ragay; Vincent Ventura; Sandrex Gainsan	Men's Duilian Weapon	9.590	6
Krisna Malecdan; Krizan Faith Collado	Women's Duilian Bare - handed	9.590	3rd place, bronze medalist(s)

=== Nanquan - Nandao - Nangun ===
Athlete	Event	Final				
Athlete	Event	Nanquan	Nandao	Nangun	Total	Rank
Vincent Mendoza	Men's Nanquan - Nandao - Nangun	Did not start				

=== Sanda ===
Athlete	Event	Quarterfinals	Semifinals	Final	
Athlete	Event	Opposition Score	Opposition Score	Opposition Score	Rank
Xander Alipio	Men's 65 kg	Nguyên (VIE); W 2–1	Marbun (INA); L 0–1	Did not advance	3rd place, bronze medalist(s)
Ernie Braca	Men's 65 kg	Saibounpheng (LAO); L 0–2	Did not advance		

=== Taijiquan - Taijijian ===
Athlete	Event	Final			
Athlete	Event	Taijiquan	Taijijian	Total	Rank
Jones Llabres Inso	Men's Taijiquan - Taijijian	9.780	9.783	19.563	1st place, gold medalist(s)
Alexander Gabriel De Los Reyes	Men's Taijiquan - Taijijian	9.376	9.383	18.759	11
Agatha Wong	Women's Taijiquan - Taijijian	9.773	9.783	19.556	1st place, gold medalist(s)
