= 2025 SEA Games =

Multi-sport event in Bangkok and Chonburi, Thailand

33rd Southeast Asian Games
- Host city: Bangkok and Chonburi, Thailand (Note: Originally to be co-hosted with Songkhla province, but all events that were to be held there were transferred to Bangkok and Chonburi due to Cyclone Senyar.)
- Motto: Ever Forward (Thai: ก้าวไปข้างหน้าไม่หยุดยั้ง, RTGS: Kaopai Khangna Mai Yutyang)
- Nations: 10 (Note: Cambodia withdrew from the event on 10 December due to political issues. (see § Participation of Cambodian athletes))
- Athletes: 9,229
- Events: 573 in 50 sports
- Opening: 9 December 2025
- Closing: 20 December 2025
- Opened by: Vajiralongkorn; King of Thailand
- Closed by: Thamanat Prompow; Deputy Prime Minister of Thailand
- Athlete's Oath: Puripol Boonson; Banlung Tubtimdang; Tanyaporn Prucksakorn
- Torch lighter: Panipak Wongpattanakit
- Main venue: Rajamangala Stadium
- Website: seagames2025.org

The 2025 SEA Games (Thai: ซีเกมส์ 2025, (Note: For official documents, it should be written as กีฬาซีเกมส์ ๒๐๒๕ using Thai numerals.) RTGS: Kila Sikem 2025, pronounced [kīː.lāː sīː.kēːm sɔ̌ːŋ.pʰān.jîː.sìp̚.hâː]), officially called the 33rd SEA Games (Thai: กีฬาซีเกมส์ ครั้งที่ 33, (Note: กีฬาซีเกมส์ ครั้งที่ ๓๓ using Thai numerals) RTGS: Kila Sikem Khrangthi 33, pronounced [kīː.lāː sīː.kēːm kʰráŋ.tîː sǎːm.sìp̚ sǎːm]), was an international multi-sport event sanctioned by the Southeast Asian Games Federation (SEAGF). The event took place from 9 to 20 December 2025 and was held across the Bangkok Metropolitan Region, as well as in the Chonburi province in Thailand.

The joint bid from the three provinces was awarded the right to host the Games on 13 January 2023 after Thailand was confirmed as the host country by the Southeast Asian Games Federation. This marked the first time that host cities were selected through a new bidding and election process for the SEA Games.

The 2025 SEA Games also marked the seventh time Thailand hosted the event. The co-host city, Bangkok, had previously hosted the event four times (1959, 1967, 1975, and 1985), while Chiang Mai hosted the 1995 edition, and Nakhon Ratchasima hosted the 2007 edition.

The original co-host, Songkhla province, was planned to host some events, but flooding caused by Cyclone Senyar struck shortly before the Games, resulting in all events planned for Songkhla eventually being relocated to venues in Bangkok and Chonburi.

== Development and preparations ==
=== Host selection ===
Hosting duties are rotated among the member countries of the SEA Games Federation. Each member country is assigned a specific year to host the event, but they have the option to withdraw or opt out of hosting for that particular edition.

==== 2019 disruption ====
On 21 July 2017, the Philippine Sports Commission (PSC) announced its decision to withdraw support for the country's hosting of the 2019 SEA Games. The government chose to reallocate funds originally intended for the event to support the rehabilitation of Marawi, which had been devastated by the Marawi crisis. Additionally, it was later reported that the Philippine Olympic Committee's insistence on handling all aspects of the hosting, including finances, security, and the organisation of the Games, as it had done for the 2005 SEA Games, contributed to the PSC's decision to withdraw its support.

On 10 August 2017, Charouck Arirachakaran, the vice-president and secretary-general of the National Olympic Committee of Thailand, stated that Thai Prime Minister Prayut Chan-o-cha had agreed to a replacement plan for the 2019 SEA Games following the Philippines' withdrawal. The potential host provinces for the event were Chiang Mai, Chonburi, and Songkhla.

However, six days later, Philippine Olympic Committee President Peping Cojuangco confirmed that the Philippines would still host the 2019 SEA Games. This decision came after Cojuangco wrote to Philippine President Rodrigo Duterte, appealing for reconsideration of the country's earlier withdrawal.

==== 2025 confirmation ====
In December 2021, Thailand was nominated as the host country for the 2025 SEA Games during the SEAGF Council and Executive Board Meetings held in Hanoi, Vietnam. Five months later, the SEAGF Council and Executive Board officially confirmed Thailand as the host for the 2025 SEA Games, with Bangkok initially nominated as the host city. Additionally, Malaysia and Singapore were confirmed as the host countries for the 2027 and 2029 editions of the SEA Games, respectively.

This marked the seventh time that Thailand had hosted the SEA Games. The capital city, Bangkok, hosted the inaugural SEAP Games—the original term for the SEA Games—in 1959 and subsequently in 1967 and 1975, as well as in 1985 after the event had become known as the SEA Games. The 1995 and 2007 editions were held in the Thai provinces of Chiang Mai and Nakhon Ratchasima, respectively.

==== Bidding and election ====
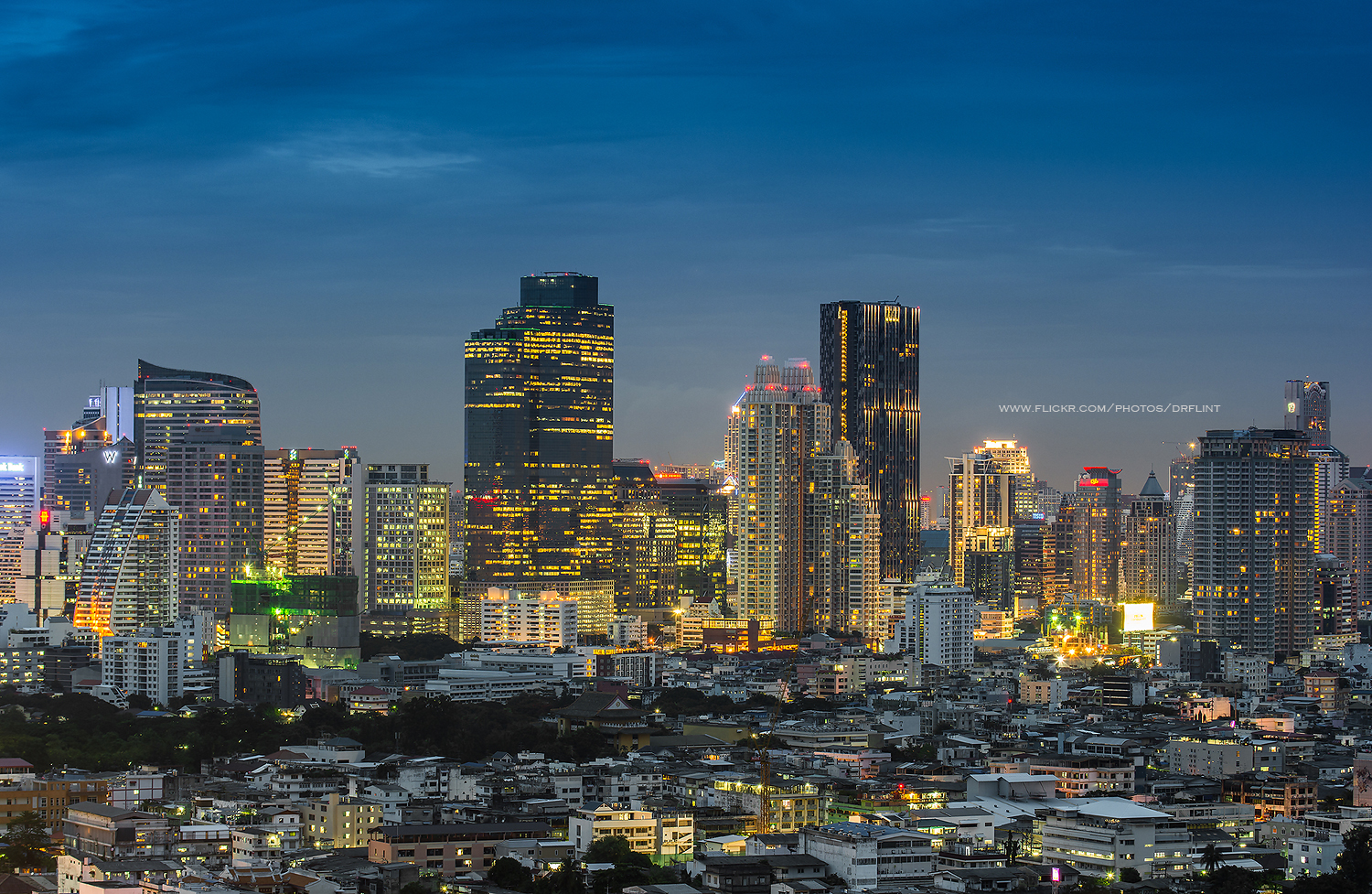
Bangkok Metropolitan Region

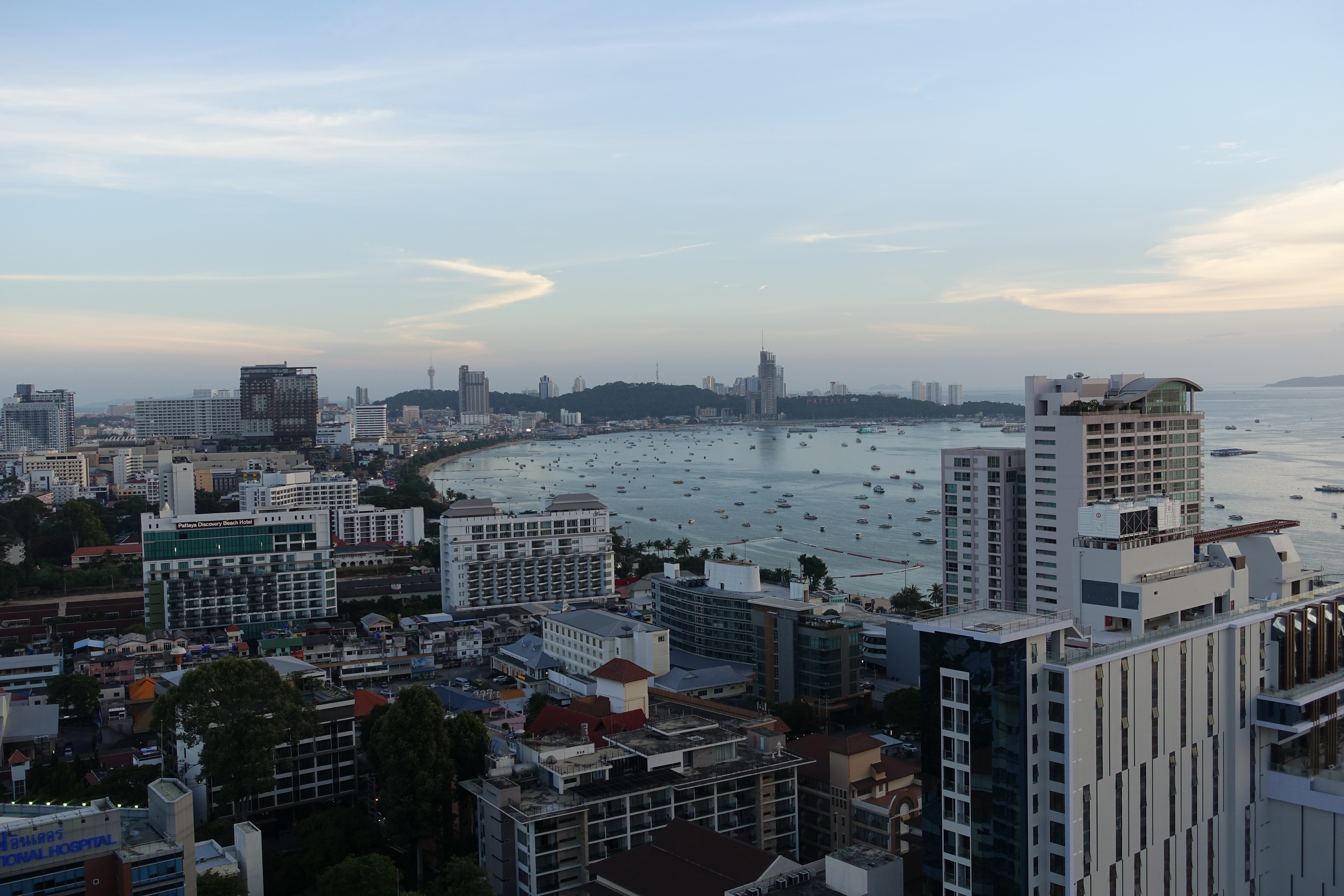
Chonburi province

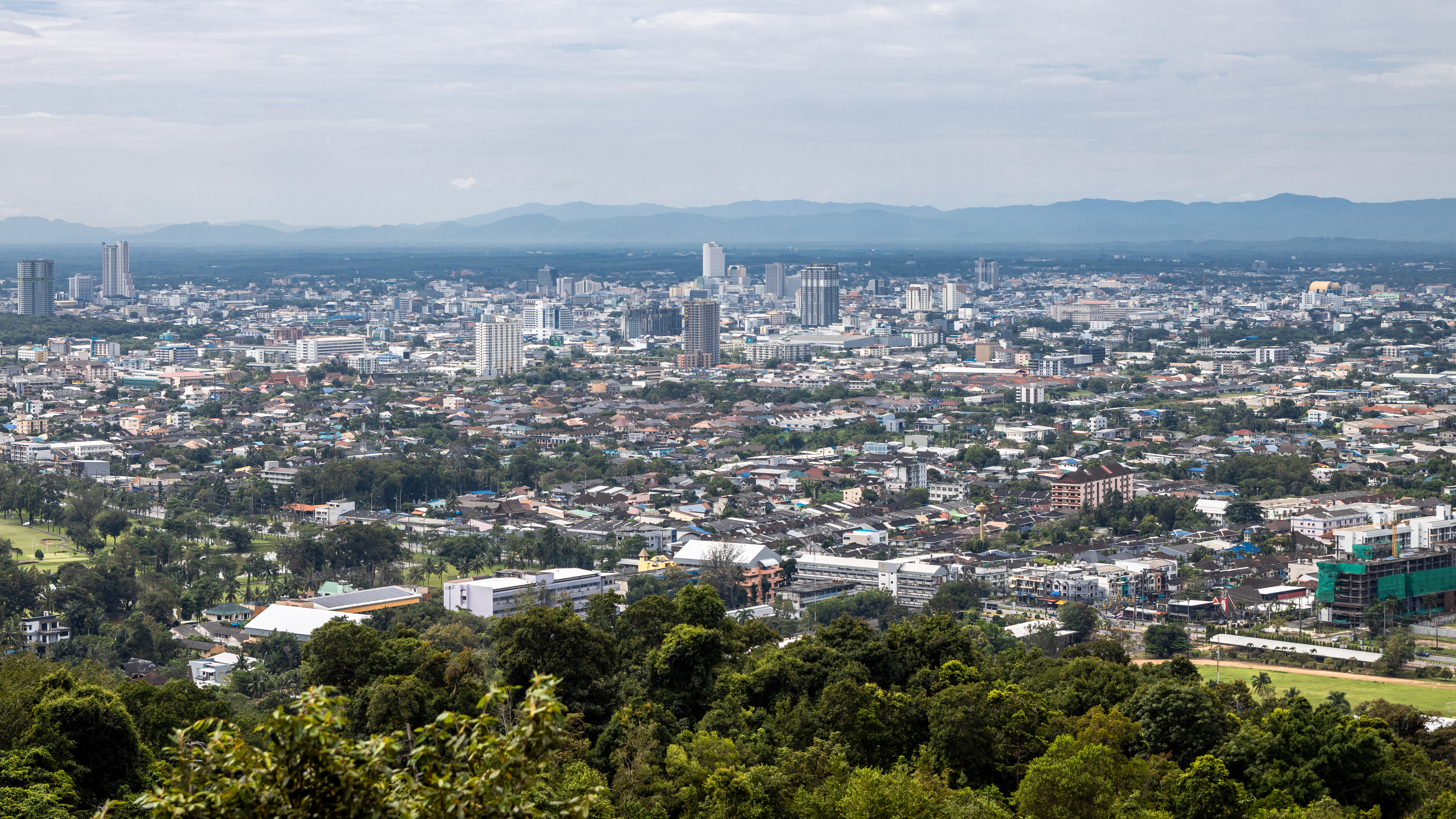
Songkhla province

On 11 October 2022, Chaipak Siriwat, the vice-president of the National Olympic Committee of Thailand, revealed the framework for the bidding process for the 2025 SEA Games. He emphasised that the host cities or provinces should aim to organise the Games at a budget-friendly cost and that there would be no requirement to build new venues. Unlike the 2019 and 2021 editions, in which competition venues were spread across 23 and 12 cities, respectively, the number of host cities for the 2025 Games would be limited to three or four.

In October 2022, Vice Governor of the Sports Authority of Thailand Prachum Boontiem nominated eight bidding parties from twelve cities or provinces interested in hosting the 2025 SEA Games. The city of Bangkok as well as the provinces of Chiang Mai, Nakhon Ratchasima, and Songkhla submitted sole bids, while the Bangkok Metropolitan Region, Chonburi, Songkhla, Krabi, Phuket, Trat, Amnat Charoen, Sisaket, Ubon Ratchathani, and Yasothon were proposed as potential bidding locations.

Although the official bidding process began in October 2022, some regions had already revealed their bidding campaigns: Ubon Ratchathani in April 2016; Chonburi in January 2019; and Krabi, Phuket, and Trang in February 2021.

On 13 January 2023, the Sports Authority of Thailand selected the Bangkok Metropolitan Region, Chonburi province, and Songkhla province to host the 33rd SEA Games, while Nakhon Ratchasima province was chosen to host the 13th ASEAN Para Games. This decision was approved by the Cabinet of Thailand in February 2023. These four locations were the first in the history of the SEA Games and ASEAN Para Games to be chosen through a bidding process.

Bidding Parties for 33rd SEA Games and 13th ASEAN Para Games
Individual City Bids (4)	Joint Province Bids (4)
Bangkok; Chiang Mai; Nakhon Ratchasima (13th ASEAN Para Games); Songkhla	Bangkok and Chonburi; Bangkok, Chonburi and Songkhla (33rd SEA Games); Krabi, Phuket and Trang; Amnat Charoen, Sisaket, Ubon Ratchathani, and Yasothon

==== Host city contract ====
During the first SEAGF Council meeting for the 2025 SEA Games in June 2024, the host city contract was signed by Chadchart Sittipunt, the governor of Bangkok; Thawatchai Srithong, the governor of Chonburi province; and Somnuek Promkhieo, the governor of Songkhla province. The ceremony followed the model of the Olympic and Asian Games host city agreements, marking the first time a SEA Games host city contract had been signed.

=== Handover ceremony ===
The handover ceremony for the SEAGF flag and the artistic performance for the 2025 SEA Games took place during the closing ceremony of the 2023 SEA Games in Phnom Penh, Cambodia, on 17 May 2023 at the Morodok Techo National Stadium.

The artistic performance for this segment, titled Sawasdee SEA Games, meaning Hello SEA Games in Thai, was performed by Kid Buaksib, a contemporary Thai dancer and artist. They were a finalist in seasons 1 and 2 of Thailand's Got Talent.

=== Kick-off ceremony ===
The kick-off ceremony for the 2025 SEA Games and the 2025 ASEAN Para Games was held at the Hua Mak Sports Complex in Bangkok on 7 December 2024.

Sorawong Thienthong, chairman of the Organising Committee and minister of Tourism and Sports, announced that the 2025 SEA Games and the 2025 ASEAN Para Games would be held under the themes of Green SEA Games and Sustainable Paralympics. The Games aimed to achieve net-zero emissions by promoting eco-friendly transportation, utilising sustainable products, and selecting venues that prioritised environmental protection. This environmentally friendly vision would also be implemented in the 2025 FIVB Women's Volleyball World Championship held in August 2025.

=== Venues ===
The 2025 SEA Games utilised existing venues across the Bangkok Metropolitan Region and Chonburi province, including those used for the 1985 SEA Games, the 1998 Asian Games, and the 2007 Summer Universiade, all of which had previously been held in the Bangkok Metropolitan Region.

The Bangkok Metropolitan Region, which includes the city of Bangkok and the neighbouring provinces of Nakhon Pathom, Nonthaburi, Pathum Thani, Samut Prakan, and Samut Sakhon, hosted the majority of the 42 sports. Meanwhile, Chonburi hosted 15 sports on its own. Only three events took place at outlying venues: the men's football preliminaries held in Chiang Mai, skeet shooting in Ratchaburi, and road bicycle racing in Nakhon Nayok and Prachinburi.

Originally, Songkhla province was intended to host 10 events; however, flooding caused by Cyclone Senyar in late November 2025 led to the relocation of those events to the remaining venues. It was also reported that Thailand would consider how to compensate the participating nations, as some competitors had already booked flights and accommodation in Songkhla. The original venues for events planned for Songkhla, as well as for other relocated events, are identified in the footnotes for this section.

Bangkok cluster

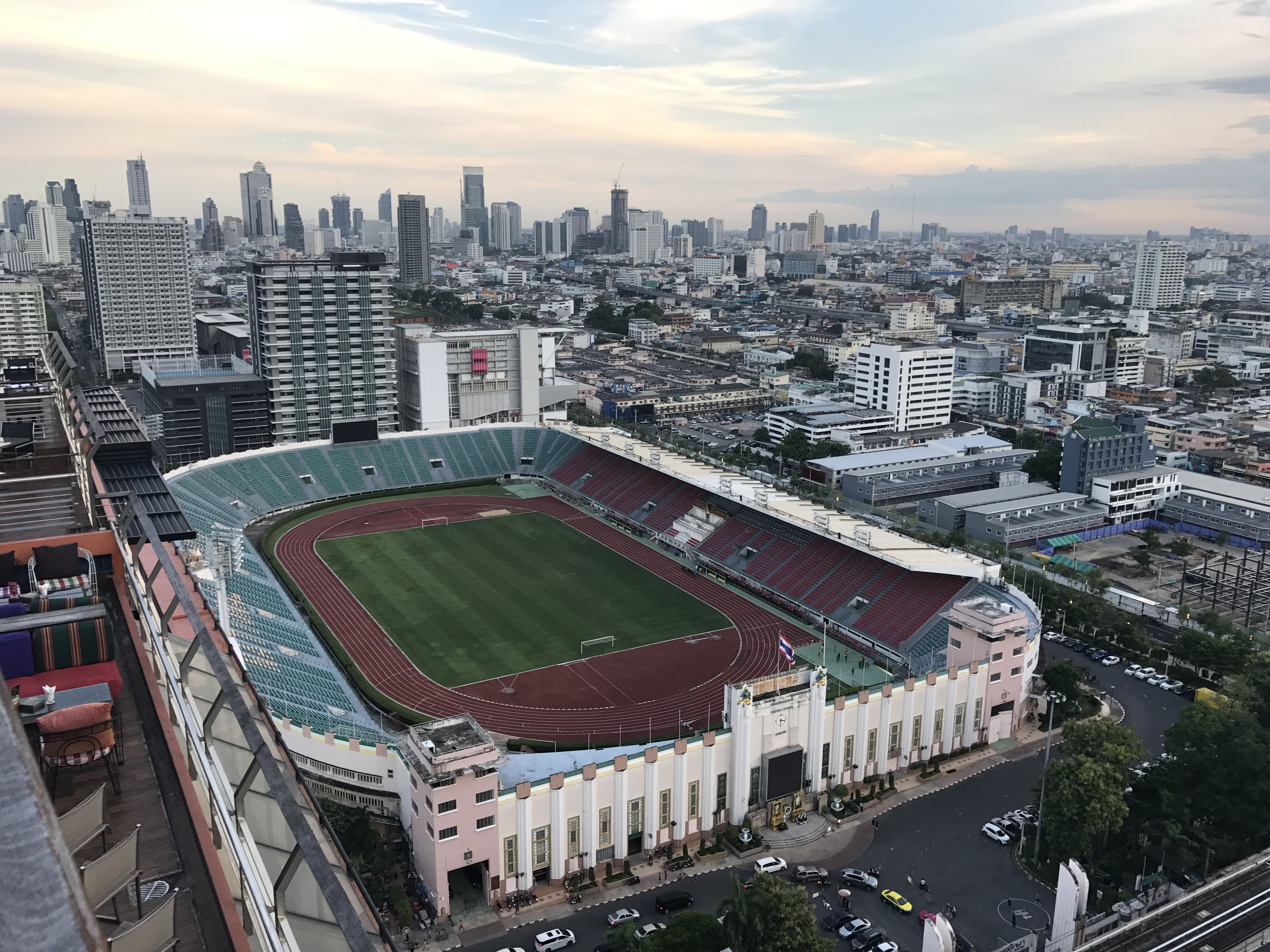
Suphachalasai Stadium

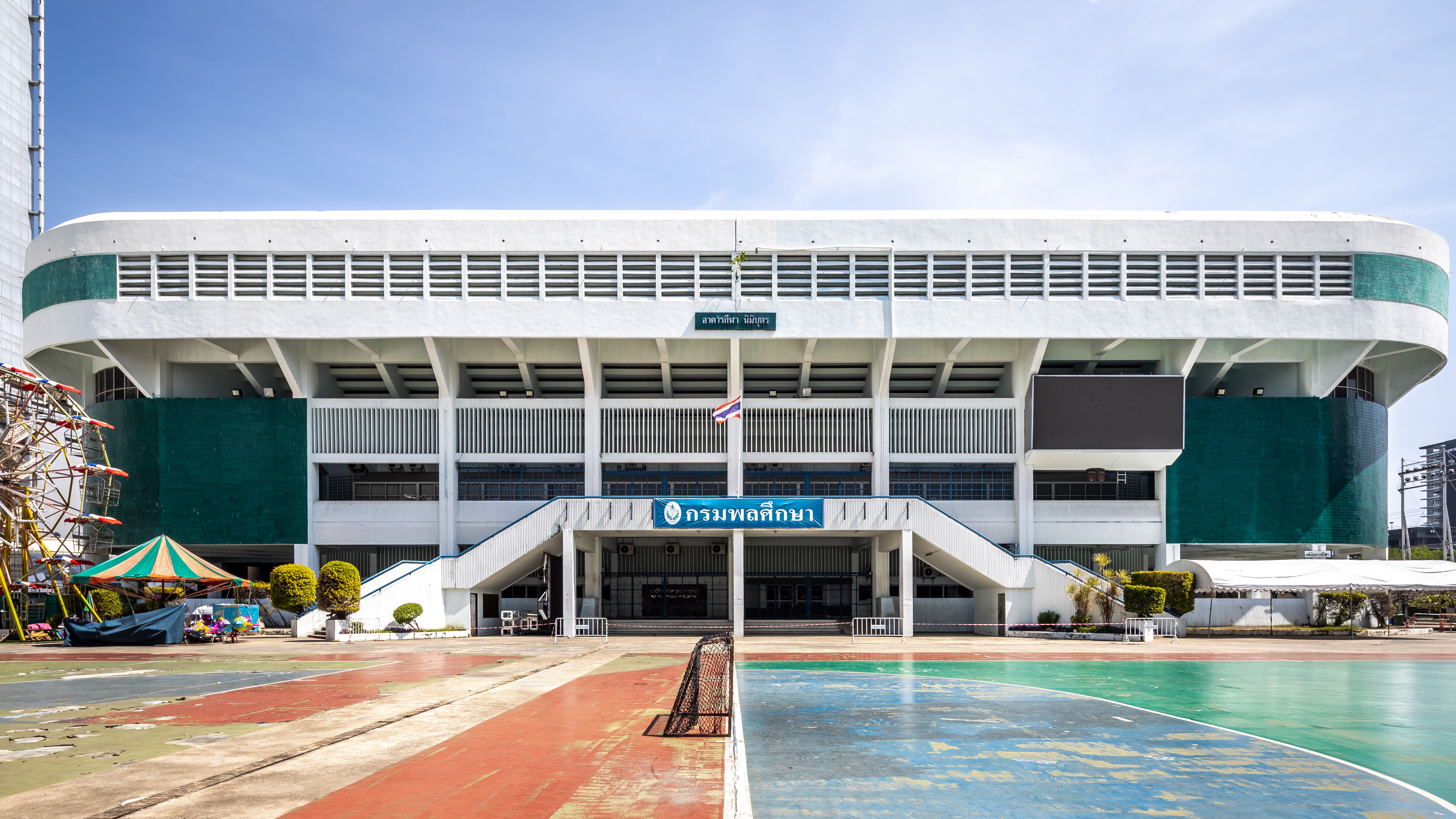
Nimibutr Stadium

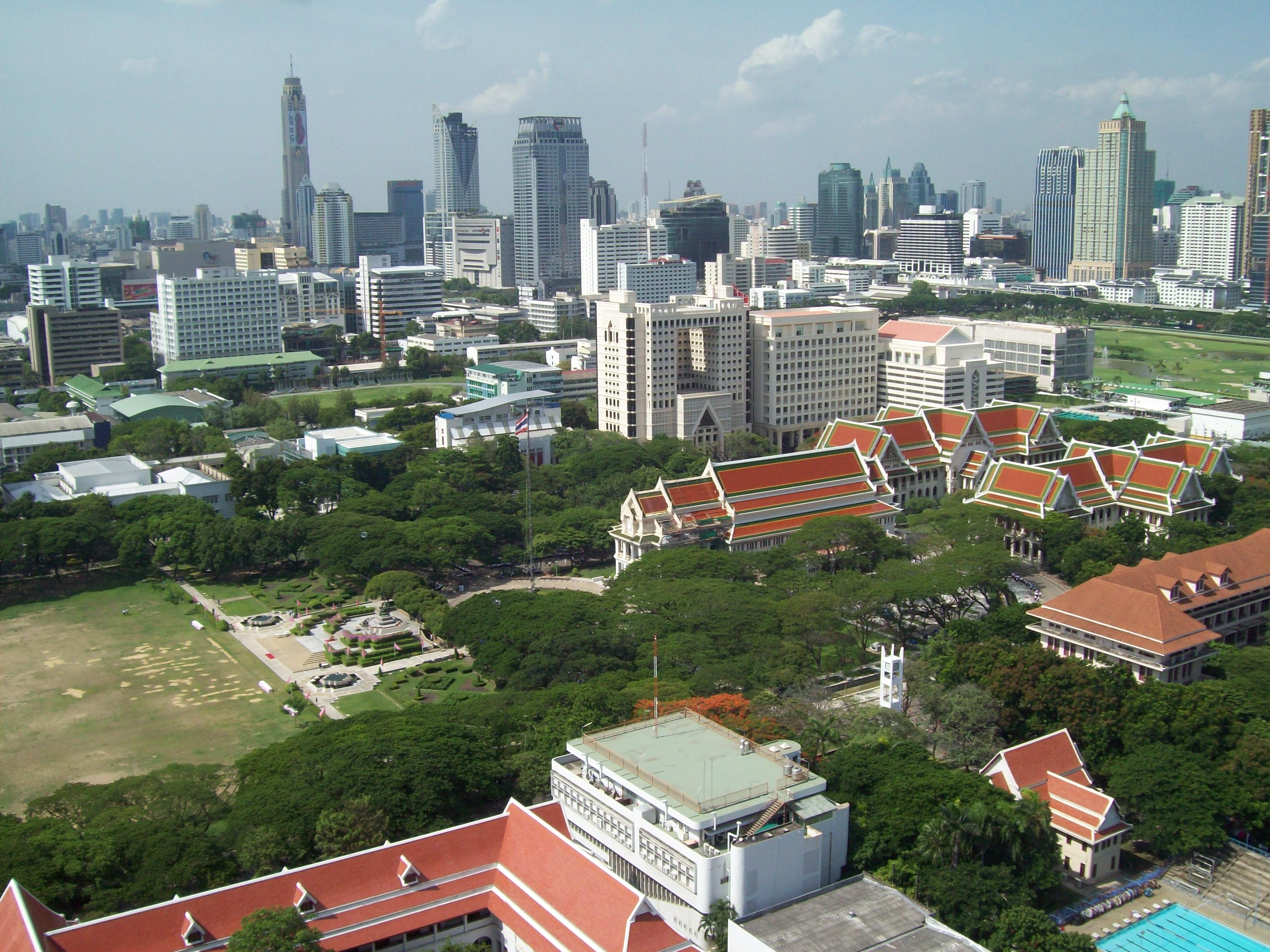
Chulalongkorn University

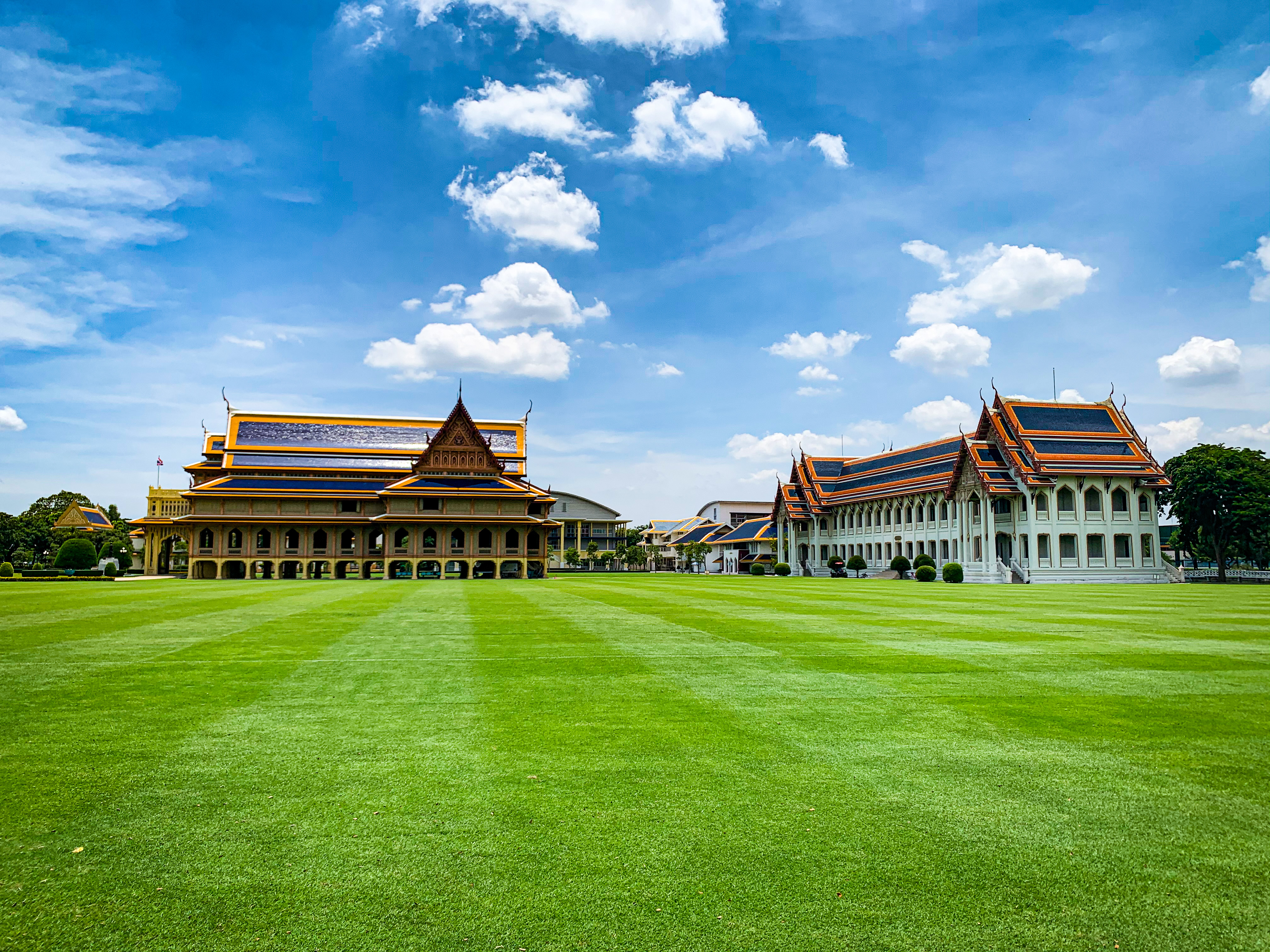
Vajiravudh College

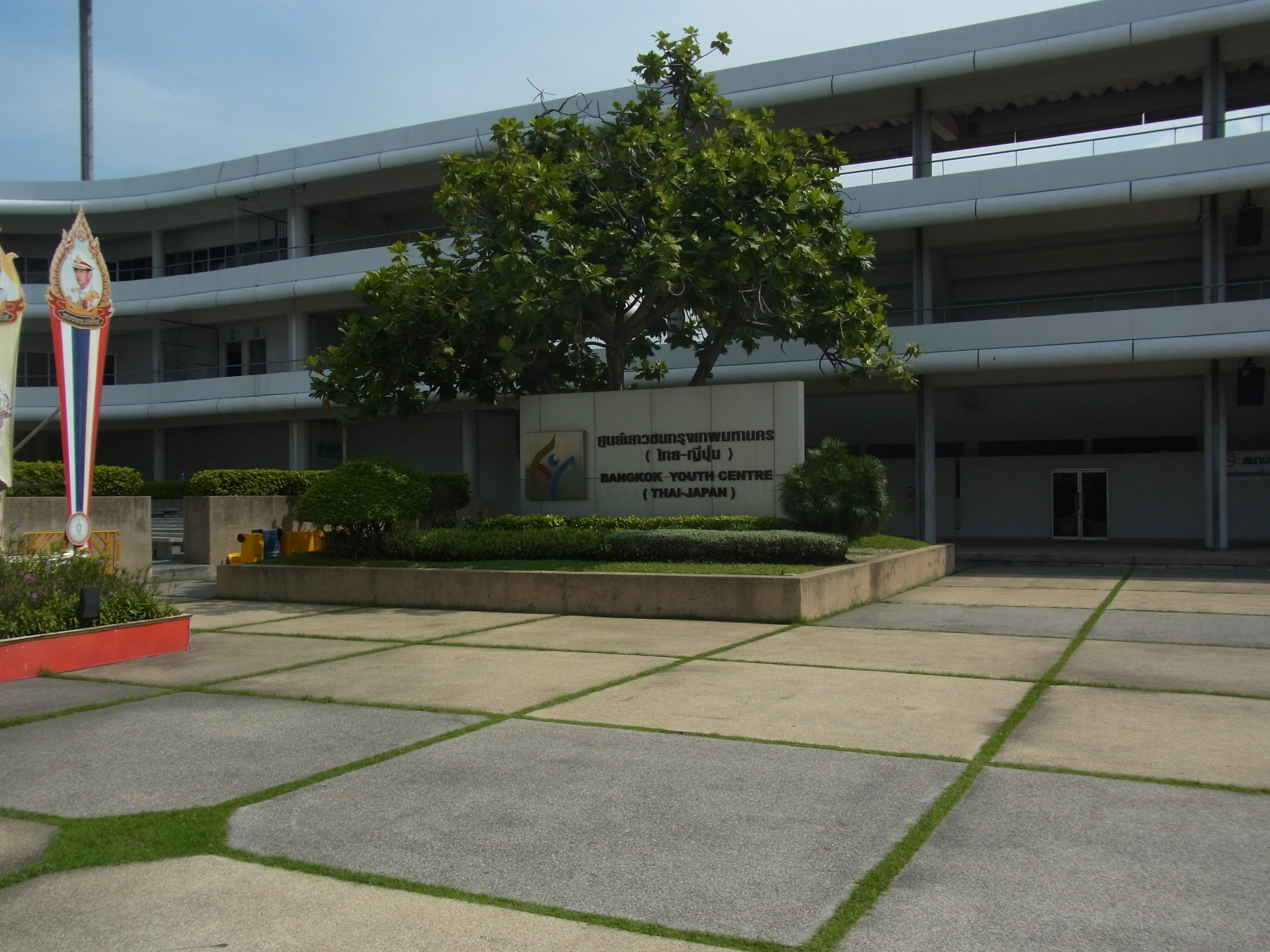
Bangkok Youth Center

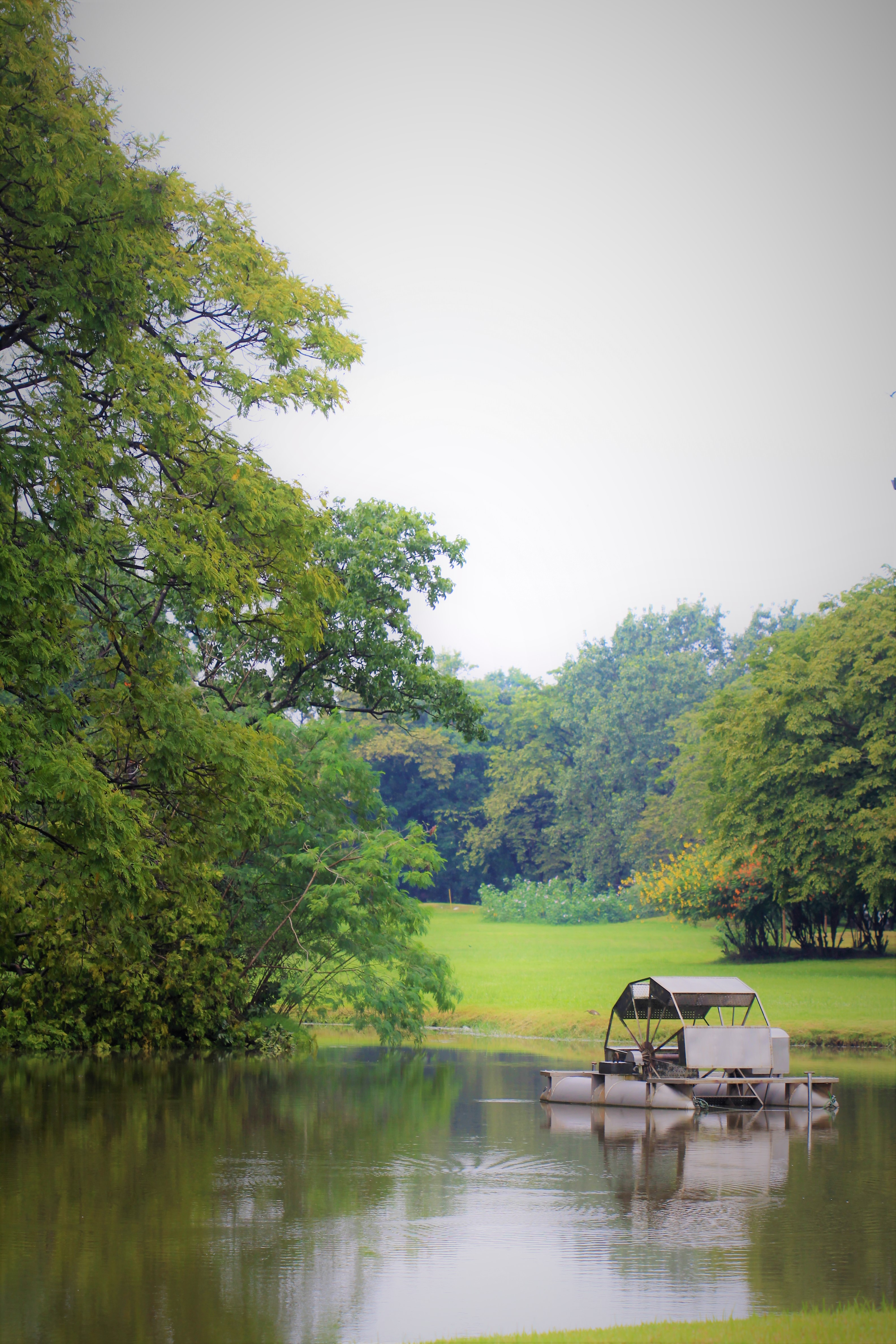
Wachirabenchathat Park

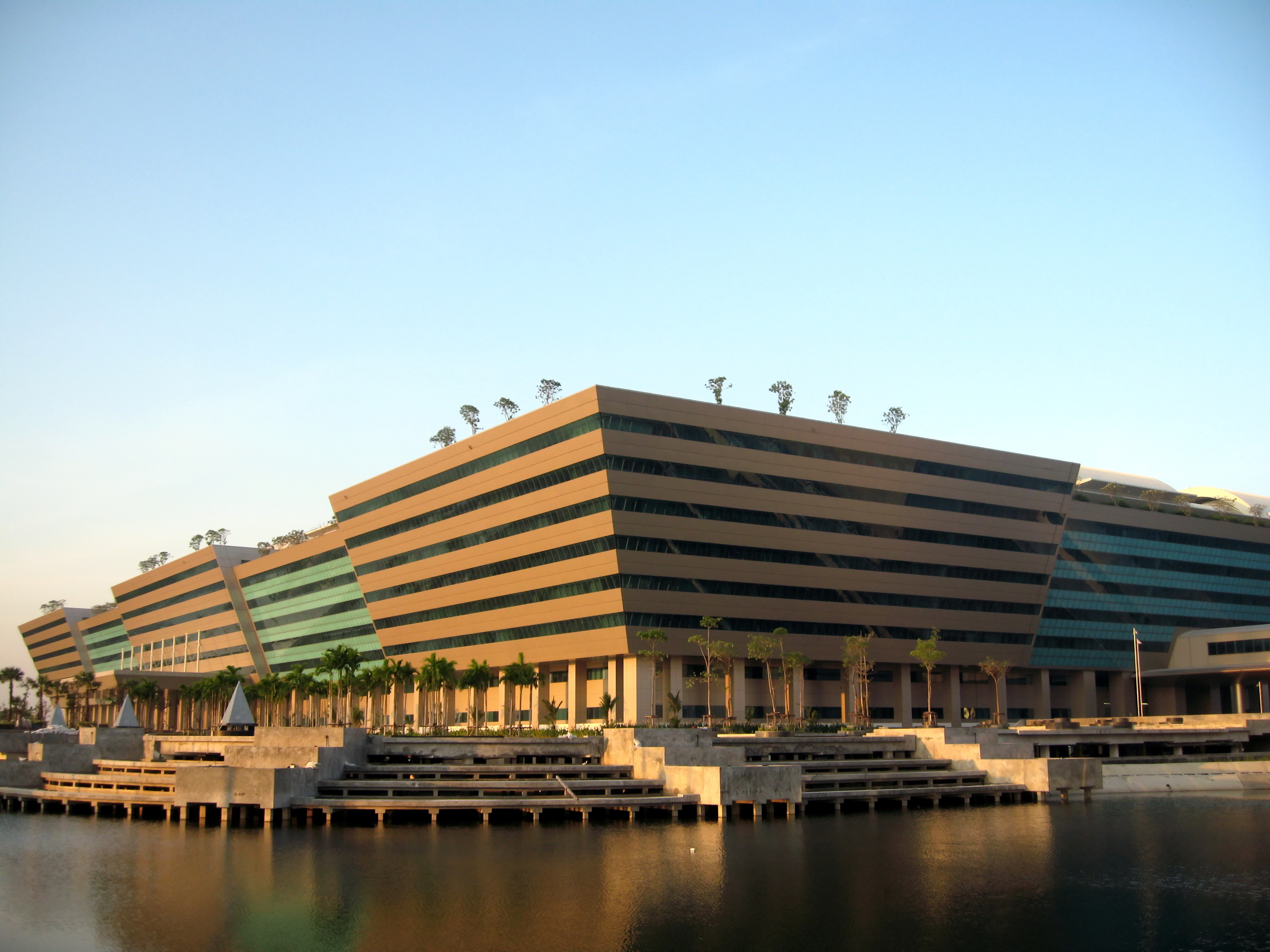
Chaeng Watthana Government Complex

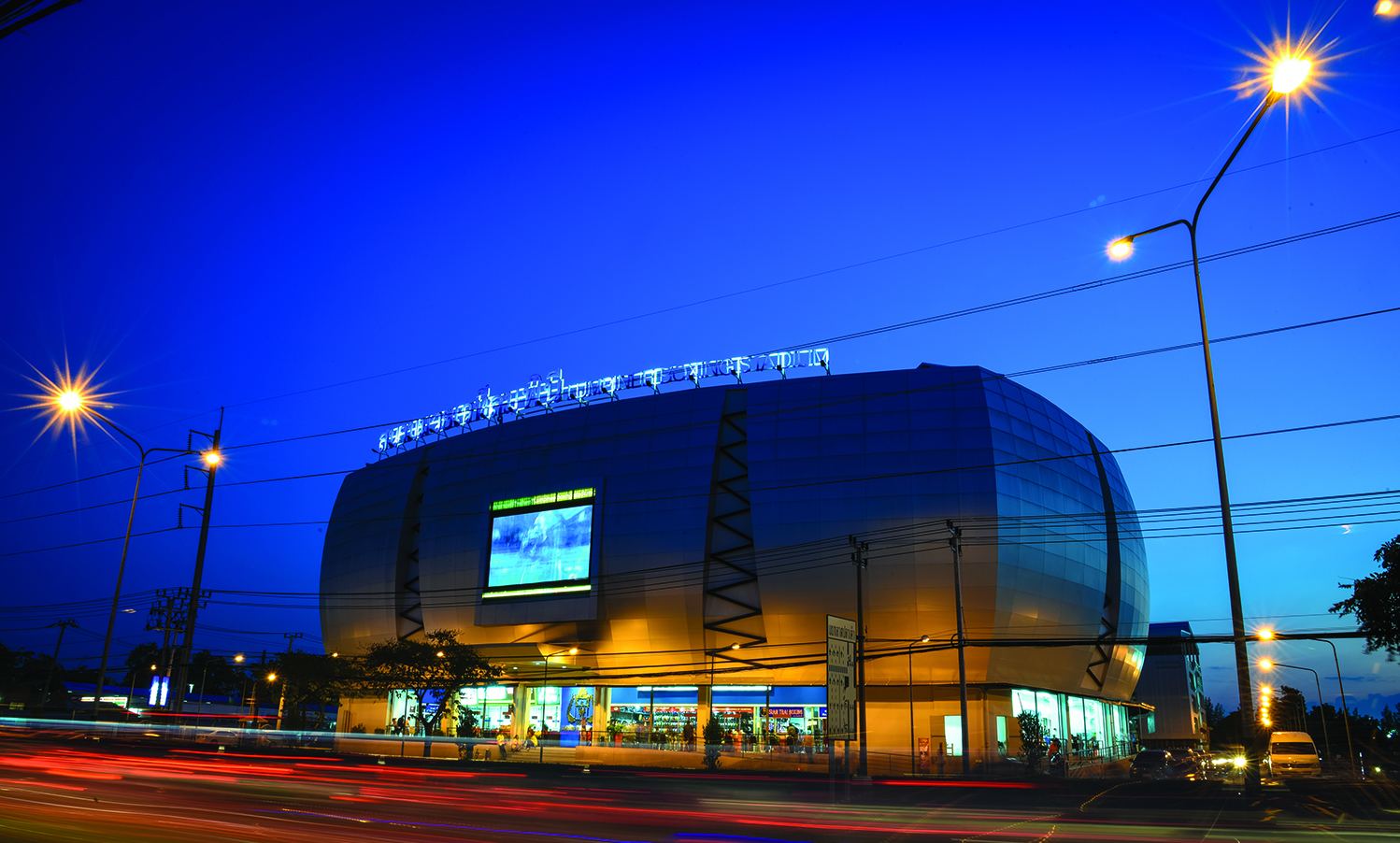
Lumpinee Boxing Stadium

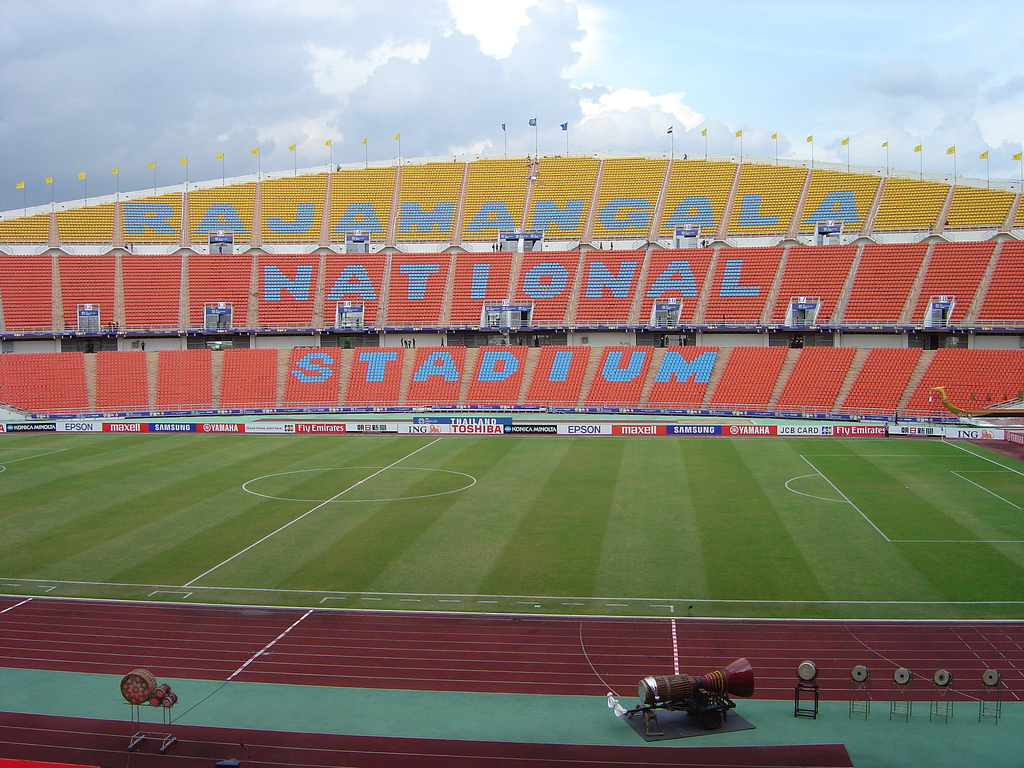
Rajamangala Stadium

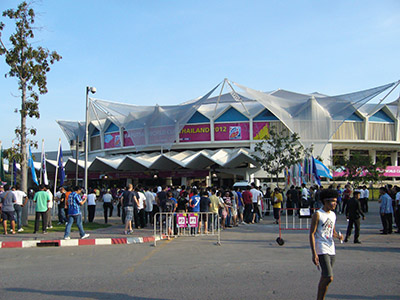
Indoor Stadium Huamark

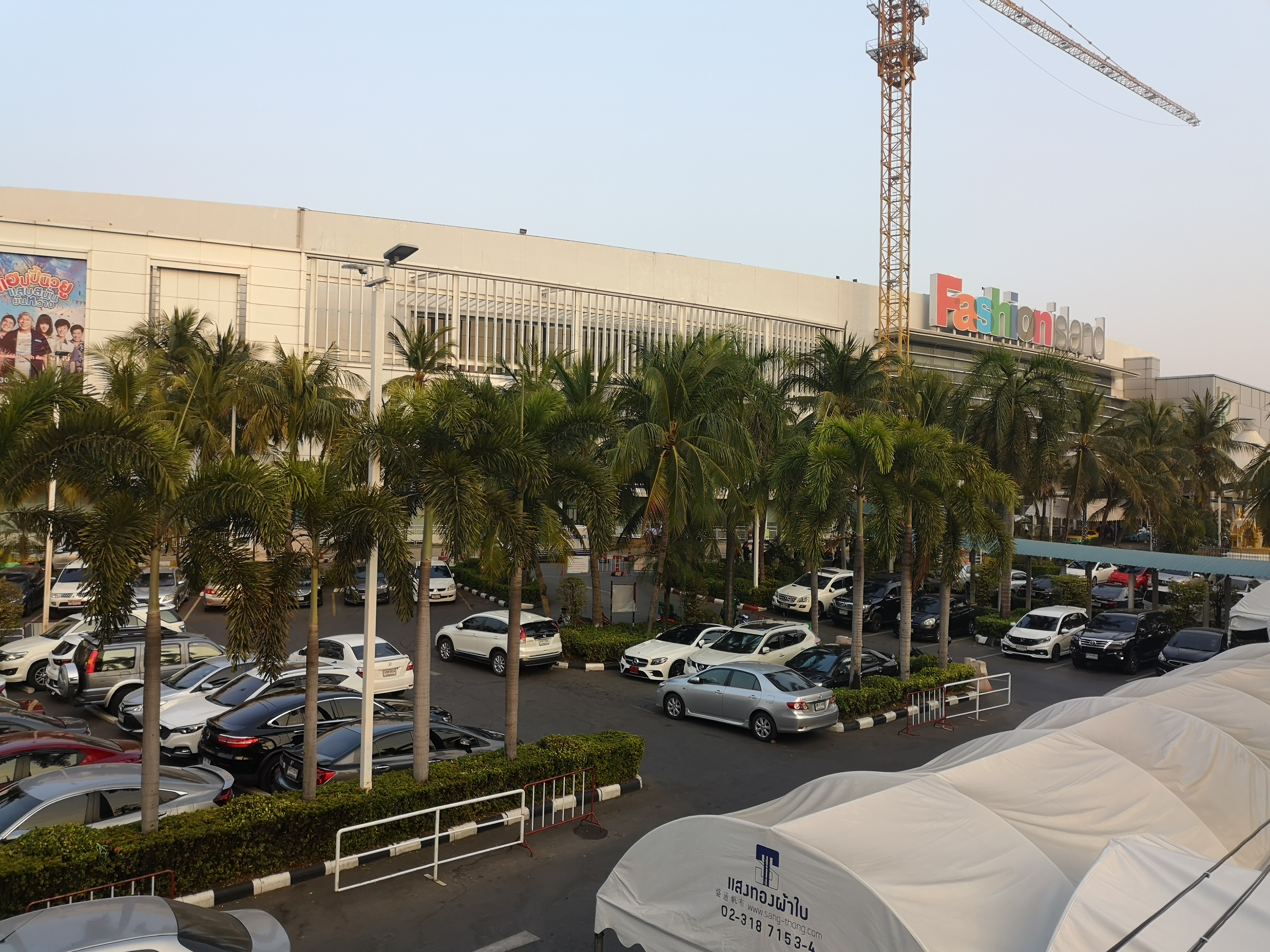
Fashion Island Mall

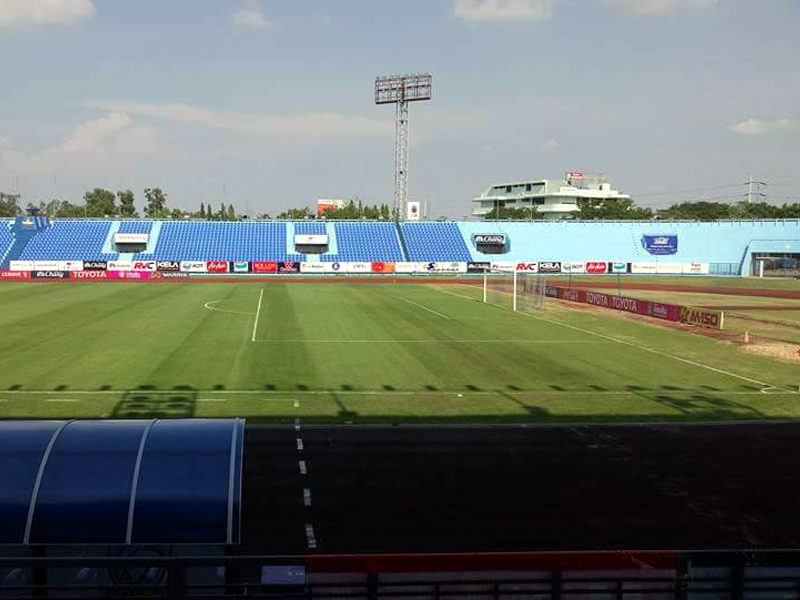
Dhupatemiya Stadium

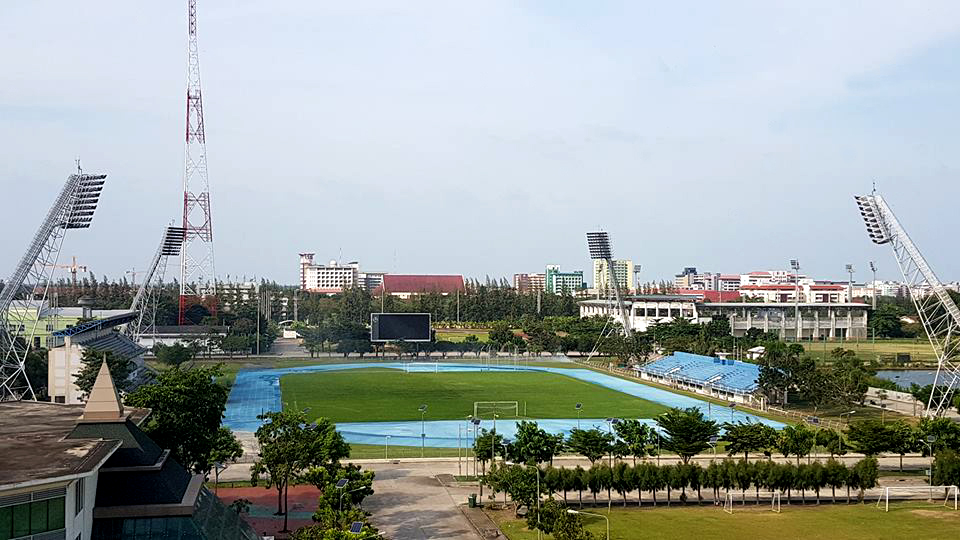
HM Queen Sirikit's 60th Anniversary Birthday Stadium

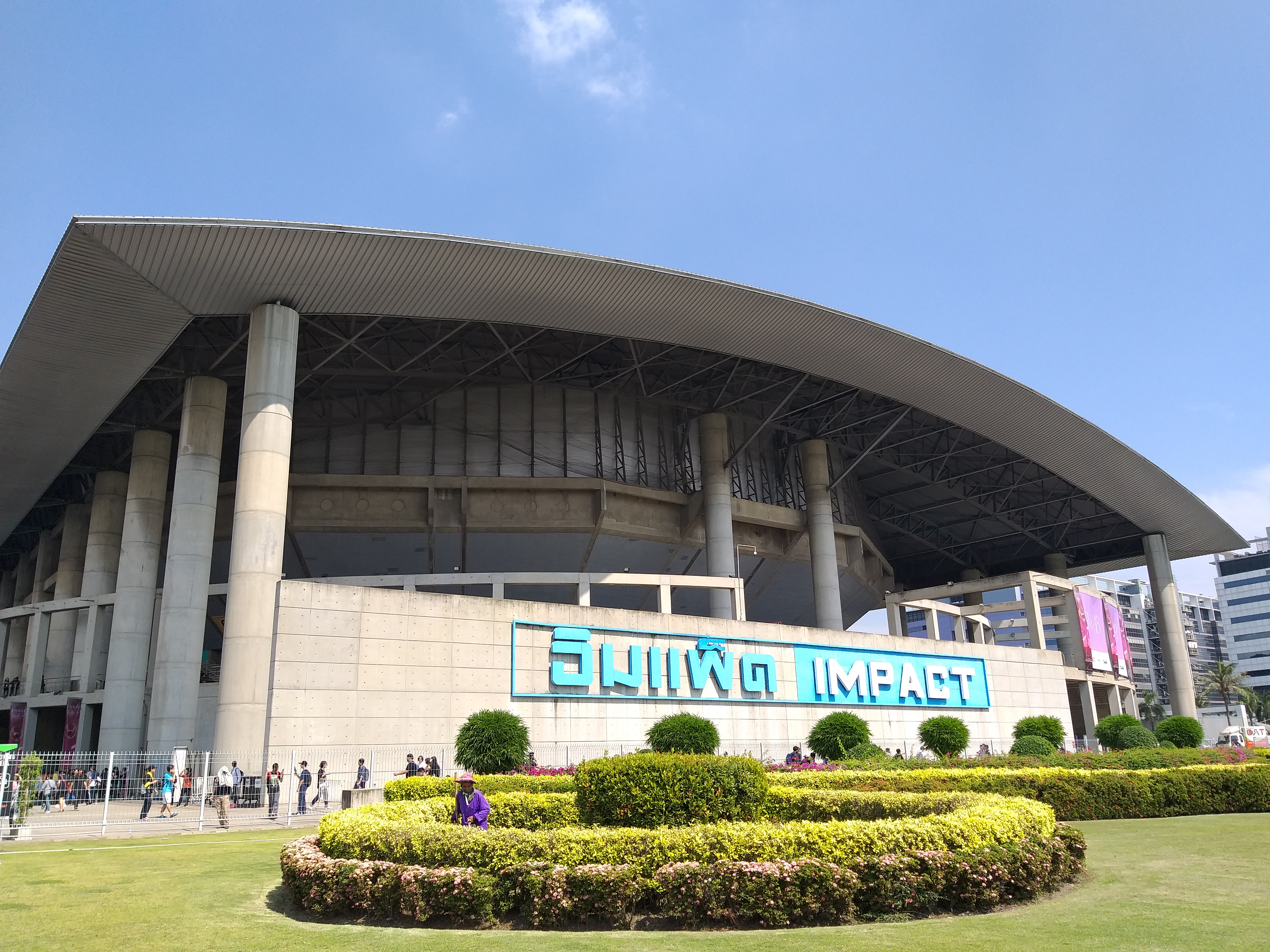
Impact Arena

Bangkok Metropolitan Region Bangkok
Venue	Events	Capacity	Status
Pathum Wan, Bangkok
Suphachalasai Stadium, National Stadium Sports Complex	Athletics	19,793	Existing
Nimibutr Stadium, National Stadium Sports Complex	Basketball, 3x3 Basketball	5,600	Existing
Chanthanayingyong Gymnasium, Chulalongkorn University	Netball		Existing
CU Sports Complex, Chulalongkorn University (Note: Boxing was originally scheduled to be held at the International Boxing Training Center, Huamark Sports Complex in Bangkok)	Boxing		Existing
Dusit, Bangkok
Squash Court, Vajiravudh College	Squash		
Din Daeng, Bangkok
Wet Gymnasium 1, Bangkok Youth Center	Floorball		Existing
Lak Si, Bangkok
Chaeng Watthana Government Complex (Note: Wushu was originally scheduled to be held The 60th Anniversary of HM The King's Accession to the Throne International Convention Center, Prince of Songkla University in Songkhla) (Note: Karate was originally scheduled to be held in Hatyai Hall, Central Hatyai Hall in Songkhla)	Wushu, Karate		Existing
Huai Khwang, Bangkok
Thailand International Ice Hockey Arena	Ice Hockey		New
Chatuchak, Bangkok
Wachirabenchathat Park	Sport Climbing		Temporary
Blu-O Rhythm & Bowl, Major Cineplex Ratchayothin Mall	Bowling		Existing
The Bazaar Hotel Bangkok (Note: Originally scheduled to be held in PREM Auditorium in Songkhla)	Chess		Existing
Bang Kapi, Bangkok
Rajamangala Stadium, Huamark Sports Complex	Ceremonies Main Venue, Football (Men's Tournament)	51,560	Existing, renovated
Indoor Stadium Huamark, Huamark Sports Complex	Volleyball	8,000	Existing
Huamark Sports Training Center, Huamark Sports Complex	Esports		Existing
Aquatic Center, Huamark Sports Complex	Swimming		Existing, renovated
Archery Field, Huamark Sports Complex	Archery		Existing
Beach Volleyball Court, Huamark Sports Complex	Beach volleyball		Existing
Extreme Park, Huamark Sports Complex	Skateboarding		Existing
Multipurpose Sports Dome, Huamark Sports Complex	Baseball5, Tug of war		Existing
Shooting Range, Huamark Sports Complex	Shooting (Pistol and Rifle, and Shotgun)	6,000 (all ranges)	Existing
Velodrome, Huamark Sports Complex	Cycling (track cycling)	700	Existing
Bang Khen, Bangkok
Lumpinee Boxing Stadium (Note: Originally scheduled to be held in Phru Khang Khao Gymnasium in Songkhla)	Muaythai	5,000	Existing
Khan Na Yao, Bangkok
Island Hall, Fashion Island Mall	Taekwondo		Existing
Lat Krabang, Bangkok
Main Stadium, King Mongkut's Institute of Technology Ladkrabang	Flying Disc (Ultimate)		Existing
Terdthai Cricket Ground	Cricket	4,000	Existing
Nong Chok, Bangkok
Kamol Sports Park	Cycling (BMX)		
Mueang Nonthaburi, Nonthaburi
MCC Hall, The Mall Lifestore Ngamwongwan	Mixed Martial Arts		
Nonthaburi Sports Complex Gymnasium	Futsal		
Pak Kret, Nonthaburi
Chaengwattana Hall, Central Chaengwattana Mall	Table tennis		
National Tennis Development Center, Muang Thong Thani	Tennis		
Thunder Dome Building, Muang Thong Thani (Note: Originally scheduled to be held in Ambassador City Jomtien Exhibition Hall in Chonburi)	Billiards and Snooker		Existing
Impact Arena, Muang Thong Thani (Note: Originally scheduled to be held in Chira Nakhon Gymnasium in Songkhla)	Pencak Silat	12,000	
Mueang Samut Prakan, Samut Prakan
IWIS International Ice Skating Center Rink, Imperial World Samrong Mall	Figure Skating, Short-track Speed Skating		
Bang Sao Thong, Samut Prakan
Aquatic Center, Assumption University	Artistic Swimming, Diving		
Gymnasium, Assumption University	Kickboxing		
Bang Bo, Samut Prakan
VS Sports Club & Siam Polo Park	Polo		
Mueang Pathum Thani, Pathum Thani
Gymnasium, Rangsit University	Ju-Jitsu		
Lam Luk Ka, Pathum Thani
Dhupatemiya Stadium, Royal Thai Air Force Sports Complex	Rugby Sevens	25,000	Existing
Thanyaburi, Pathum Thani
Baseball Field, HM Queen Sirikit's 60th Birthday Anniversary Sports Center	Baseball		
Softball Field, Rajamangala University of Technology Thanyaburi	Softball		
Chalermphrakiat Sports Center, Rajamangala University of Technology Thanyaburi (Note: Originally scheduled to be held in Parichat Hall, Thaksin University in Songkhla)	Kabaddi		
Rajamangala Auditorium, Rajamangala University of Technology Thanyaburi (Note: Originally scheduled to be held in The 60th Anniversary of HM The King's Accession to the Throne International Convention Center, Prince of Songkla University in Songkhla)	Judo		Existing
Khlong Luang, Pathum Thani
Aquatic Center, Thammasat University	Water Polo		
Asian Institute of Technology Ground	Cricket		
Gymnasium, Thammasat University	Badminton, Gymnastics		
ESC Wake Park	Water Skiing, Wakeboarding		
Valaya Alongkorn Rajabhat University under the Royal Patronage	Petanque		Existing
Mueang Nakhon Pathom, Nakhon Pathom
Nakhon Pathom Municipal Gymnasium	Chinlone, Sepak Takraw		

Chonburi cluster

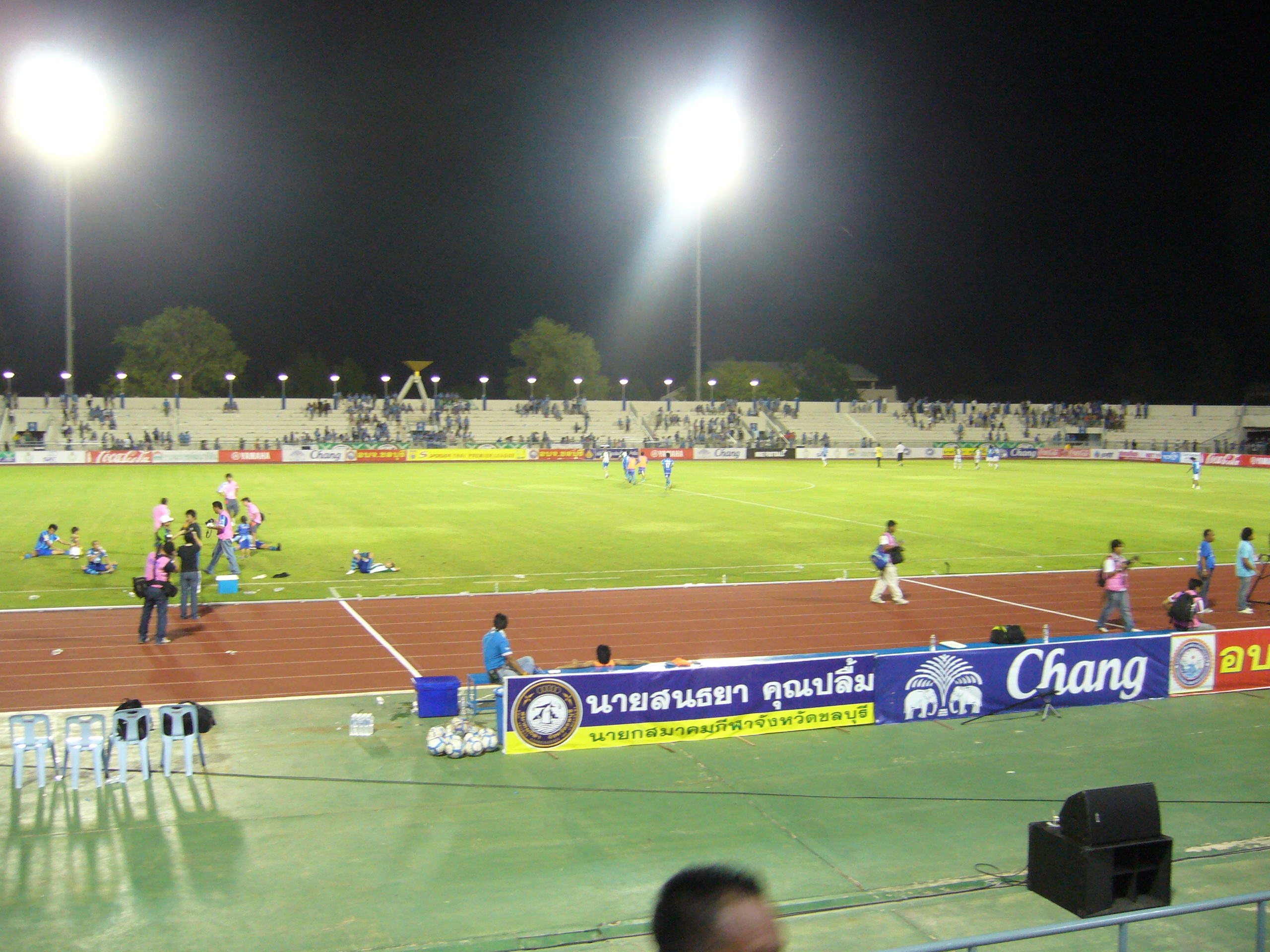
Thailand National Sports University Stadium

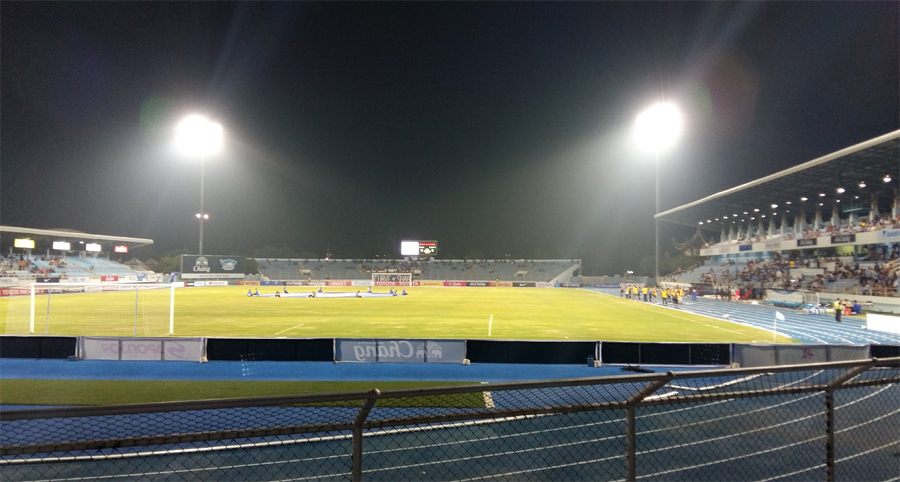
Chonburi Stadium

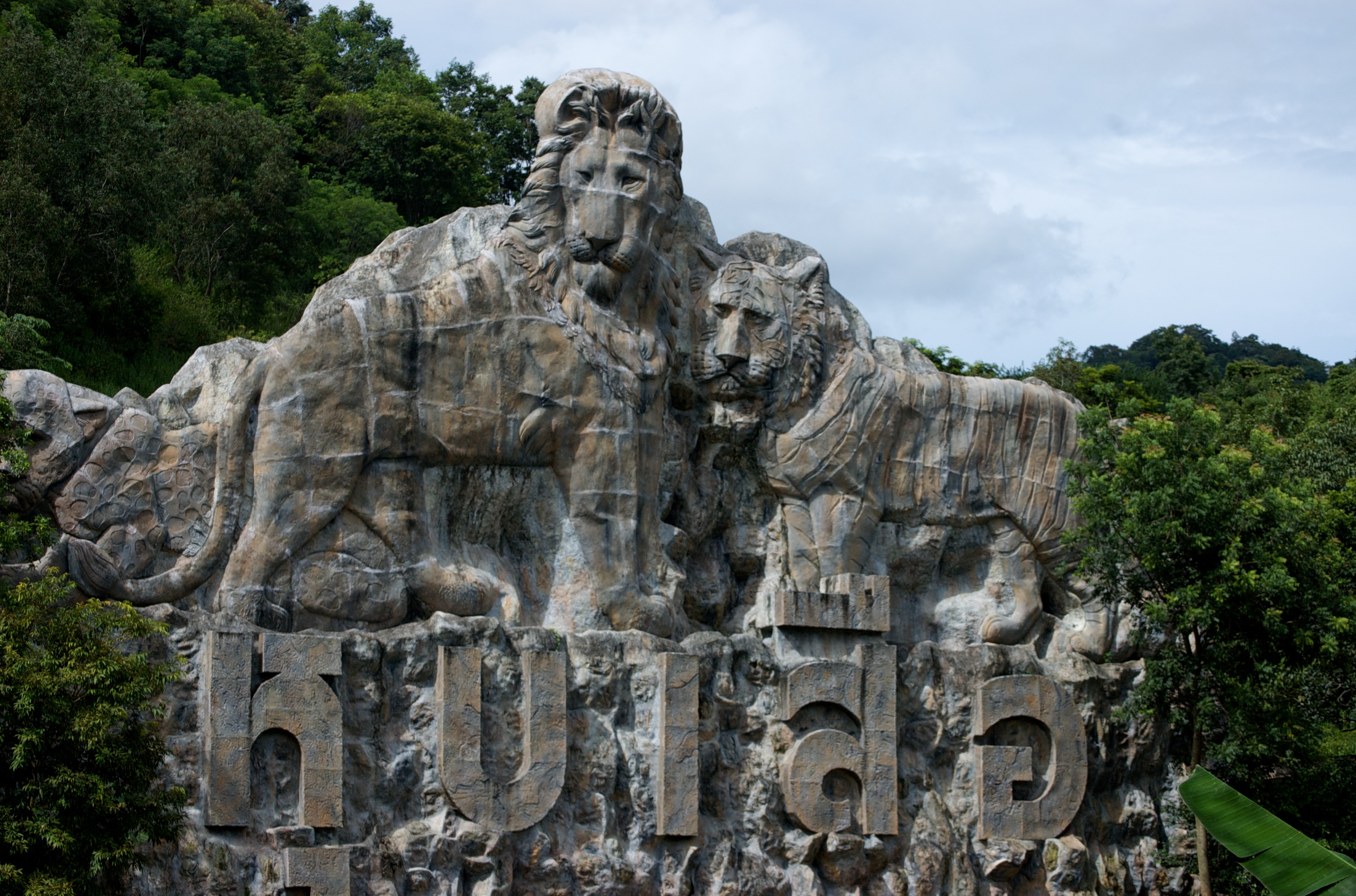
Khao Kheow Open Zoo

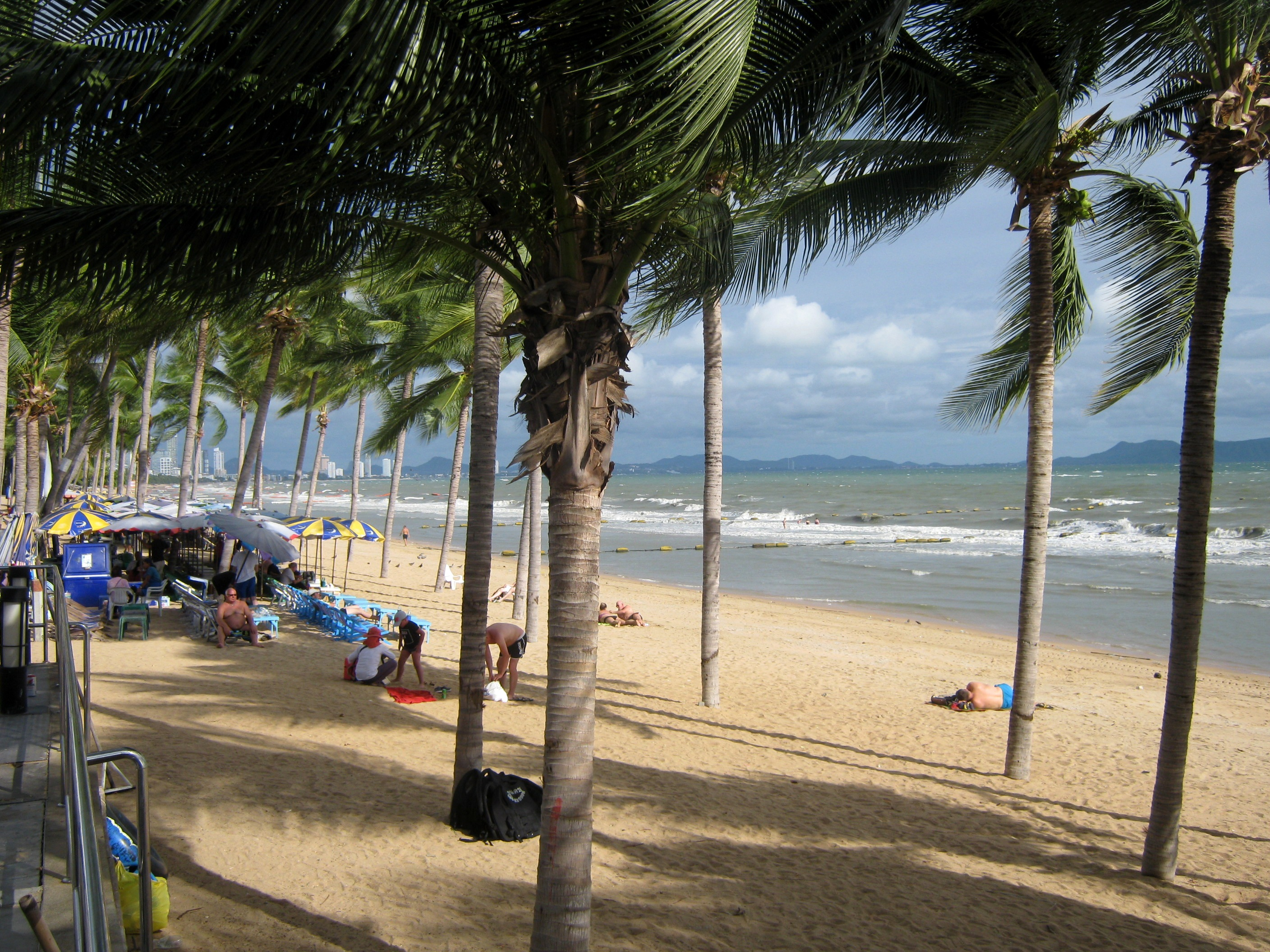
Jomtien Beach

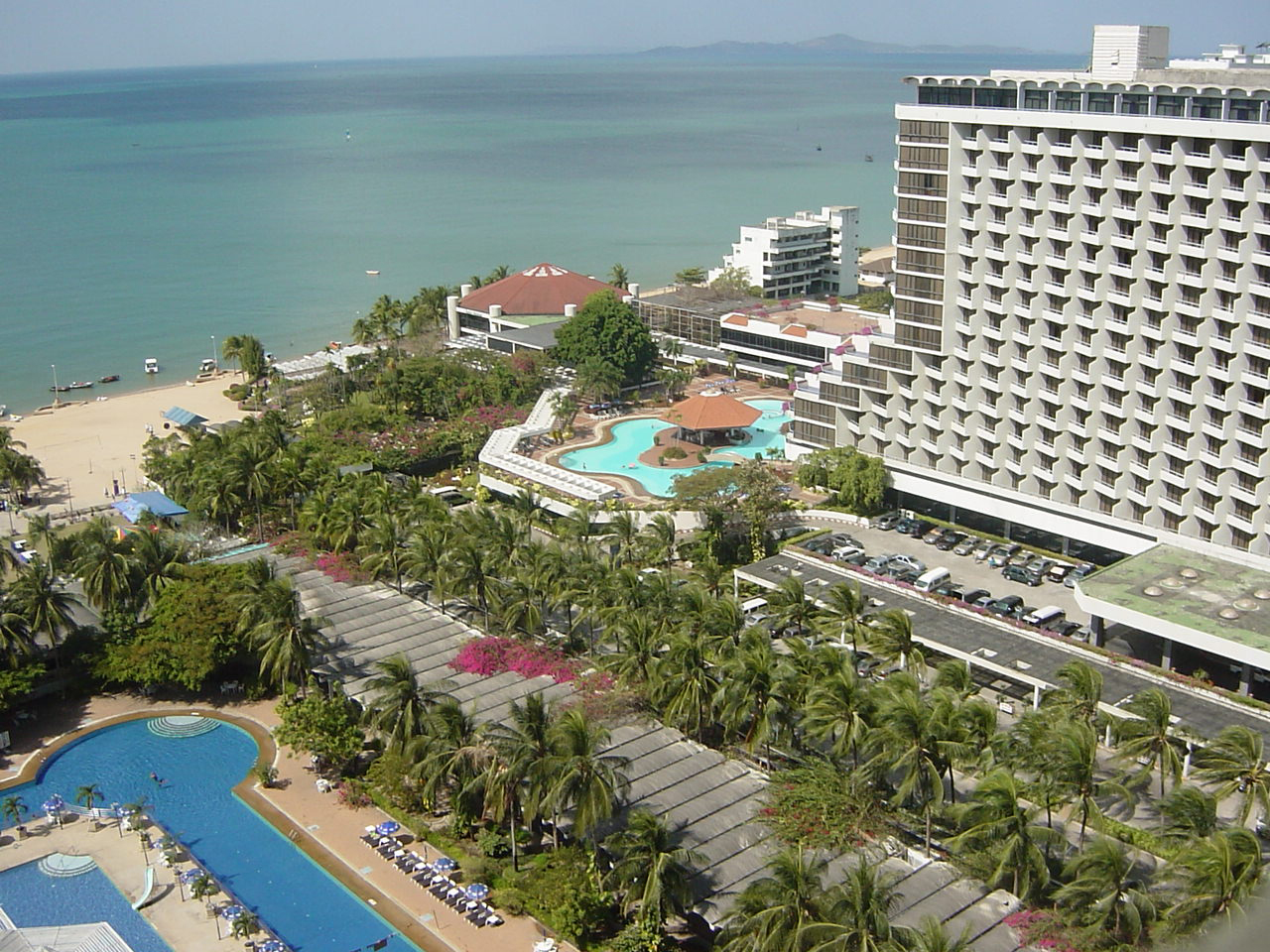
Ambassador City Jomtien

Laem Mae Phim Beach

Chonburi province Rayong province
Venue	Events	Capacity	Status
Mueang Chonburi, Chonburi
Thailand National Sports University Stadium	Football (Women's Tournament)	11,000	Existing
Chonburi Stadium	Football (Women's Tournament)	8,680	Existing
Multipurpose Gymnasium, Thailand National Sports University	Indoor Hockey		
Hockey Field, Thailand National Sports University	Field hockey, Hockey5s		
Olympic Gymnasium, Chonburi Sports School	Weightlifting		
SEA Games Gymnasium, Chonburi Sports School	Teqball		
Amata Spring Country Club	Golf		
Si Racha, Chonburi
Khao Kheow Open Zoo	Cycling (Mountain Biking)		
Nong Kho Reservoir	Air Sports		
Pacific Hall, Pacific Park Si Racha	Wrestling		
Bang Lamung, Chonburi
Jomtien Beach	Jet Skiing, Open Water Swimming, Modern Pentathlon, Sailing (Windsurfing)		
Samae Beach, Ko Lan	Jet Skiing, Open Water Swimming, Modern Pentathlon, Sailing (Windsurfing)		
Indoor Athletics Stadium, Eastern National Sports Training Center (Chaiyaphruek)	Handball		
Practical Shooting Range, Eastern National Sports Training Center (Huai Yai)	Practical Shooting		
Thai Polo and Equestrian Club	Equestrian		
Sattahip, Chonburi
Public Area, Ambassador City Jomtien Hotel	Rowing (Coastal), Sailing (Kiteboarding)		
Samudara Kila Yachting Center	Sailing (Sailing)		
Royal Thai Fleet Golf Course	Woodball		
Ban Chang, Rayong
Royal Thai Navy Rowing and Canoeing Training Center	Canoeing (Sprint, Slalom), Dragon Boat, Rowing		
Klaeng, Rayong
Laem Mae Phim Beach	Aquathlon, Duathlon, Triathlon		

Outlying venues

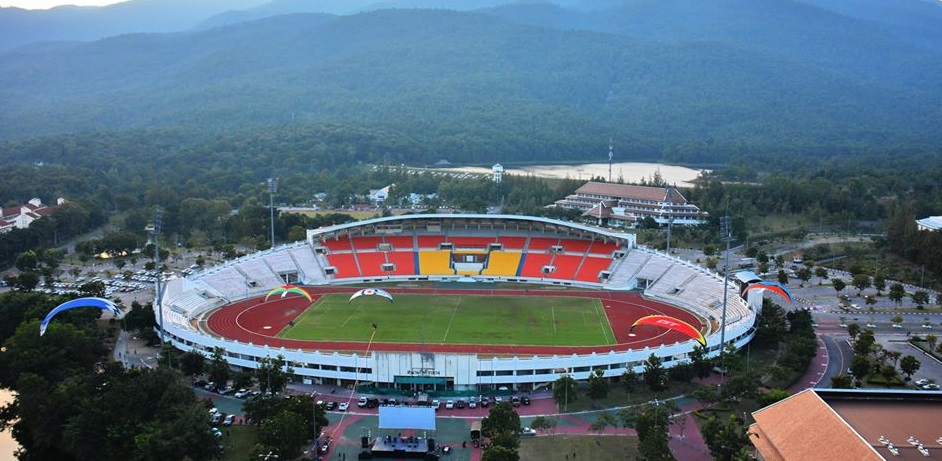
700th Anniversary Stadium

Other venues
Location	Venue	Events	Capacity	Status
Photharam, Ratchaburi	Photharam Shooting Range	Shooting (Skeet)		
Mueang Chiang Mai, Chiang Mai	700th Anniversary of Chiang Mai Stadium	Football (Men's Group Stage)	17,909	Existing
Mueang Prachinburi, Prachinburi	Burapha Prachaphakdi Park	Road Bicycle Racing		
Mueang Prachinburi, Prachinburi	Khao Yai National Park	Road Bicycle Racing		
Mueang Nakhon Nayok, Nakhon Nayok	Khao Yai National Park	Road Bicycle Racing		
Mueang Nakhon Nayok, Nakhon Nayok	Chulachomklao Royal Military Academy	Road Bicycle Racing		

=== Budget ===
The initial estimated budget for the 2025 SEA Games and the 2025 ASEAN Para Games was ฿2.055 billion, with ฿1.683 billion requested from the government budget. The budget for these events was lower than the cost of the 1998 Asian Games, which was ฿2.372 billion, but higher than the cost of the 2007 Summer Universiade, which amounted to ฿1.843 billion. Meanwhile, the combined cost of the 2007 SEA Games and the 2008 ASEAN Para Games was ฿1.463 billion.

=== Torch relay ===
The torch relay of the games began on 16 November in Bangkok.

== The Games ==
=== Opening ceremony ===
The opening ceremony of the 2025 SEA Games took place at Rajamangala Stadium on 9 December 2025 and was opened by King Vajiralongkorn.

=== Sports ===
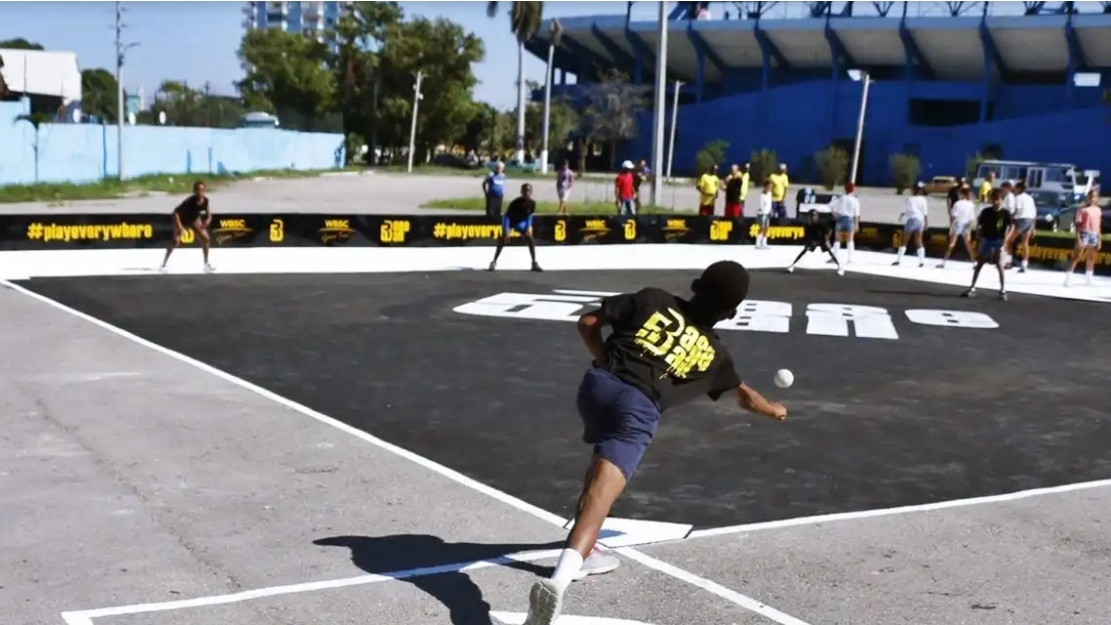
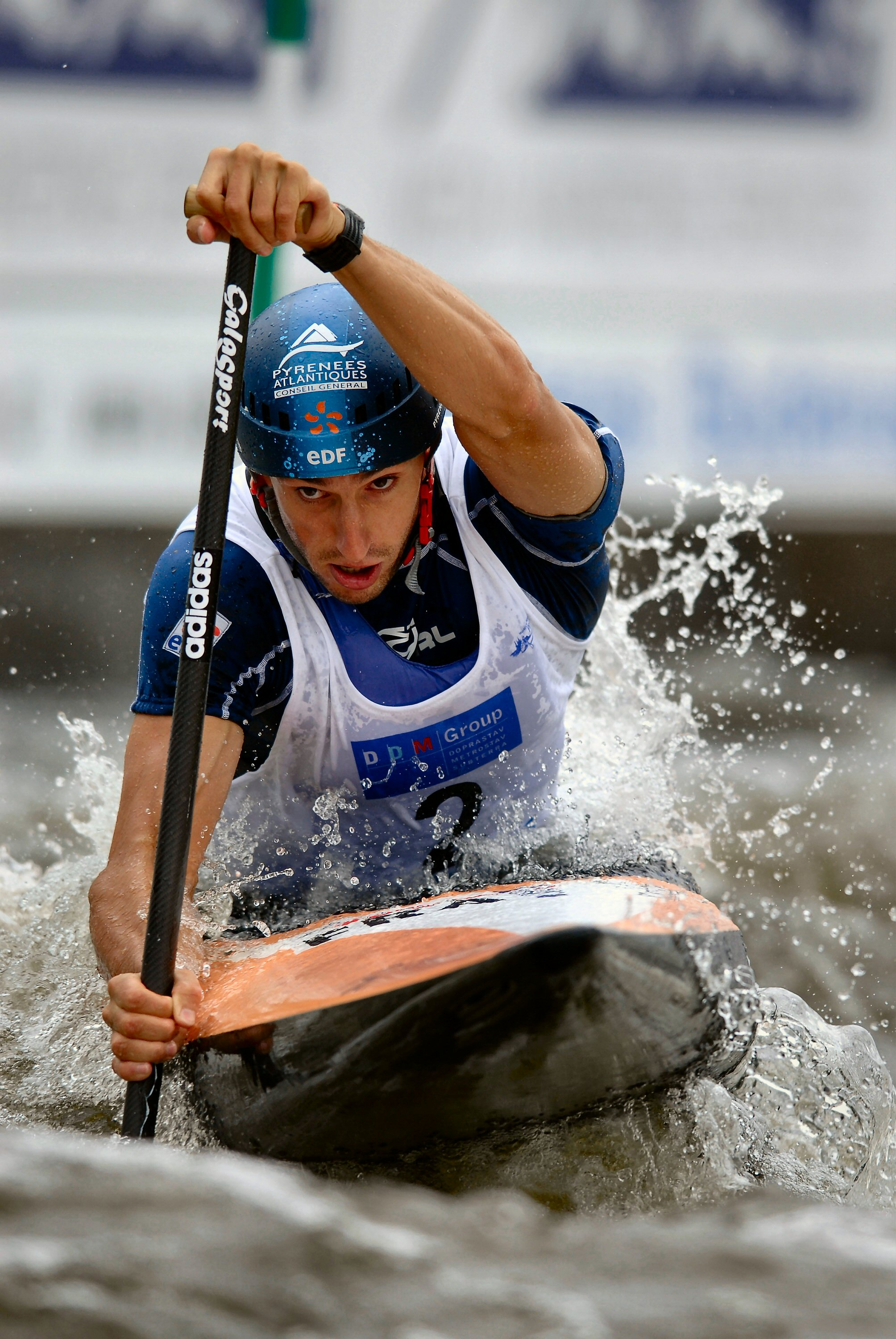
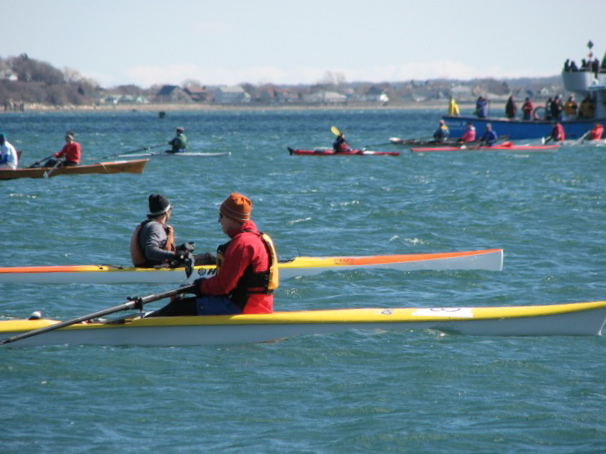
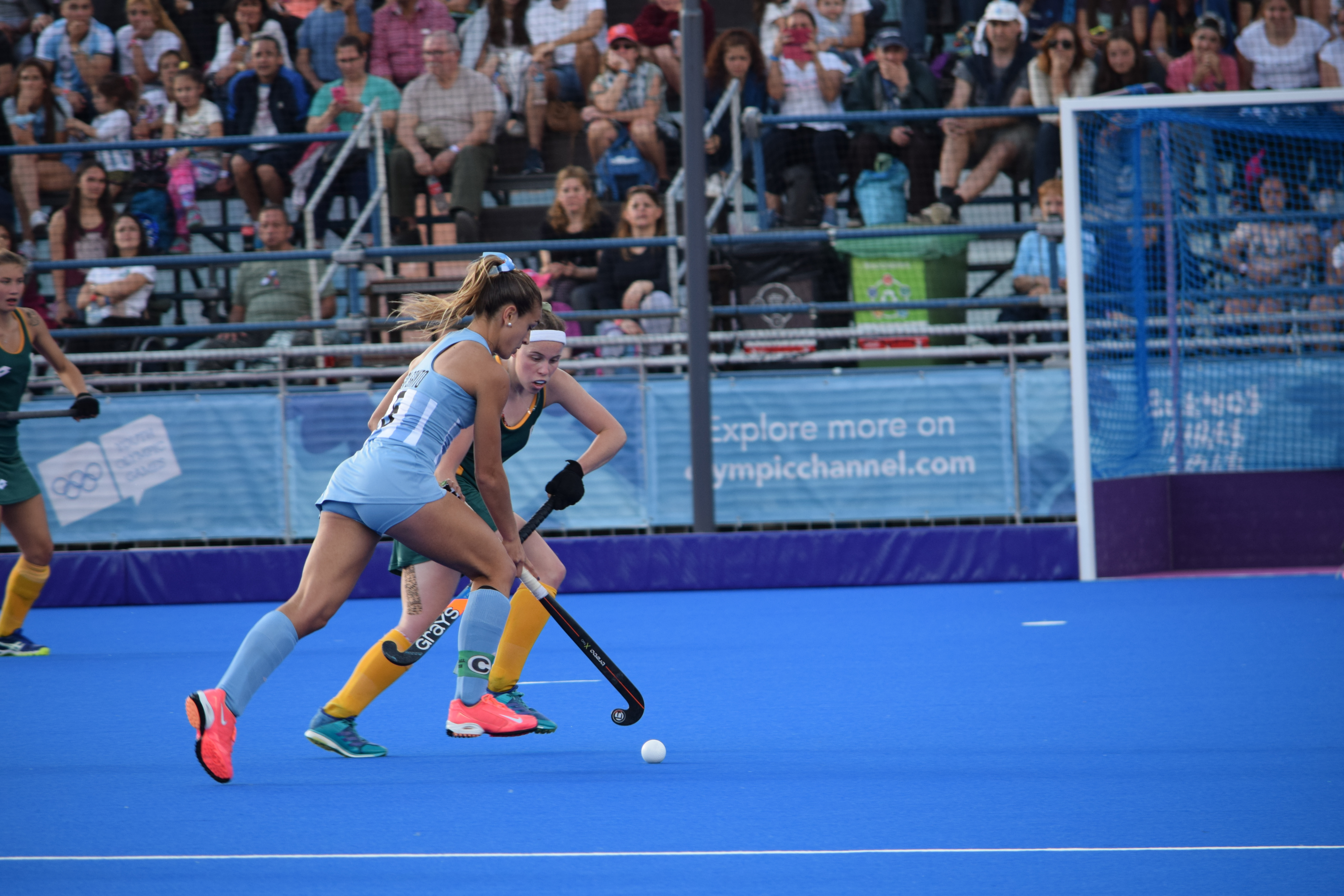
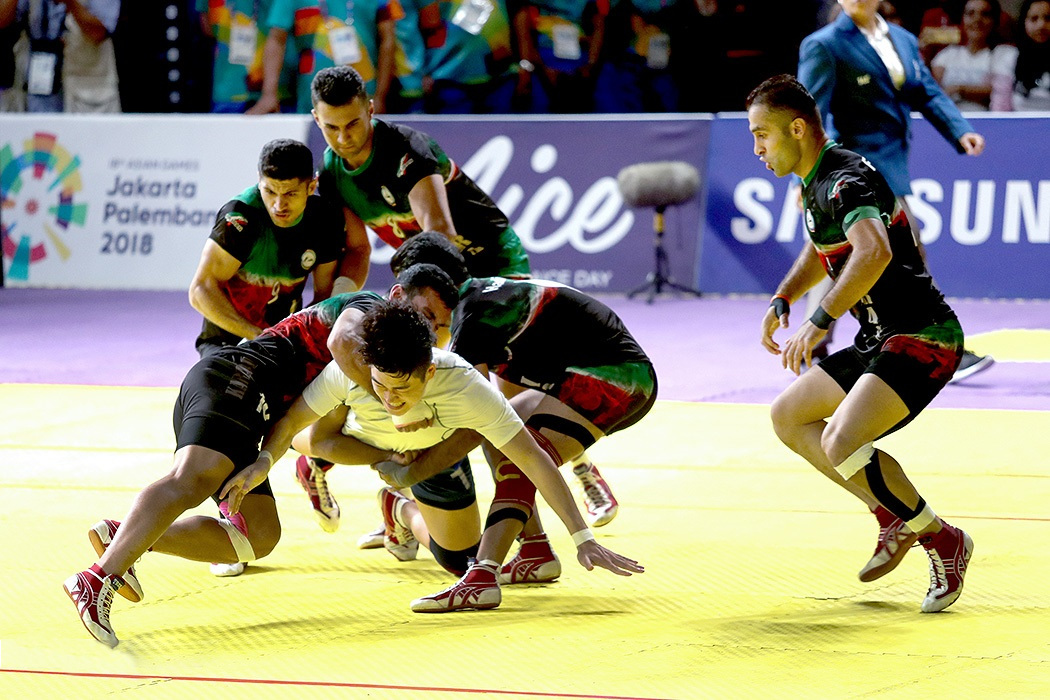
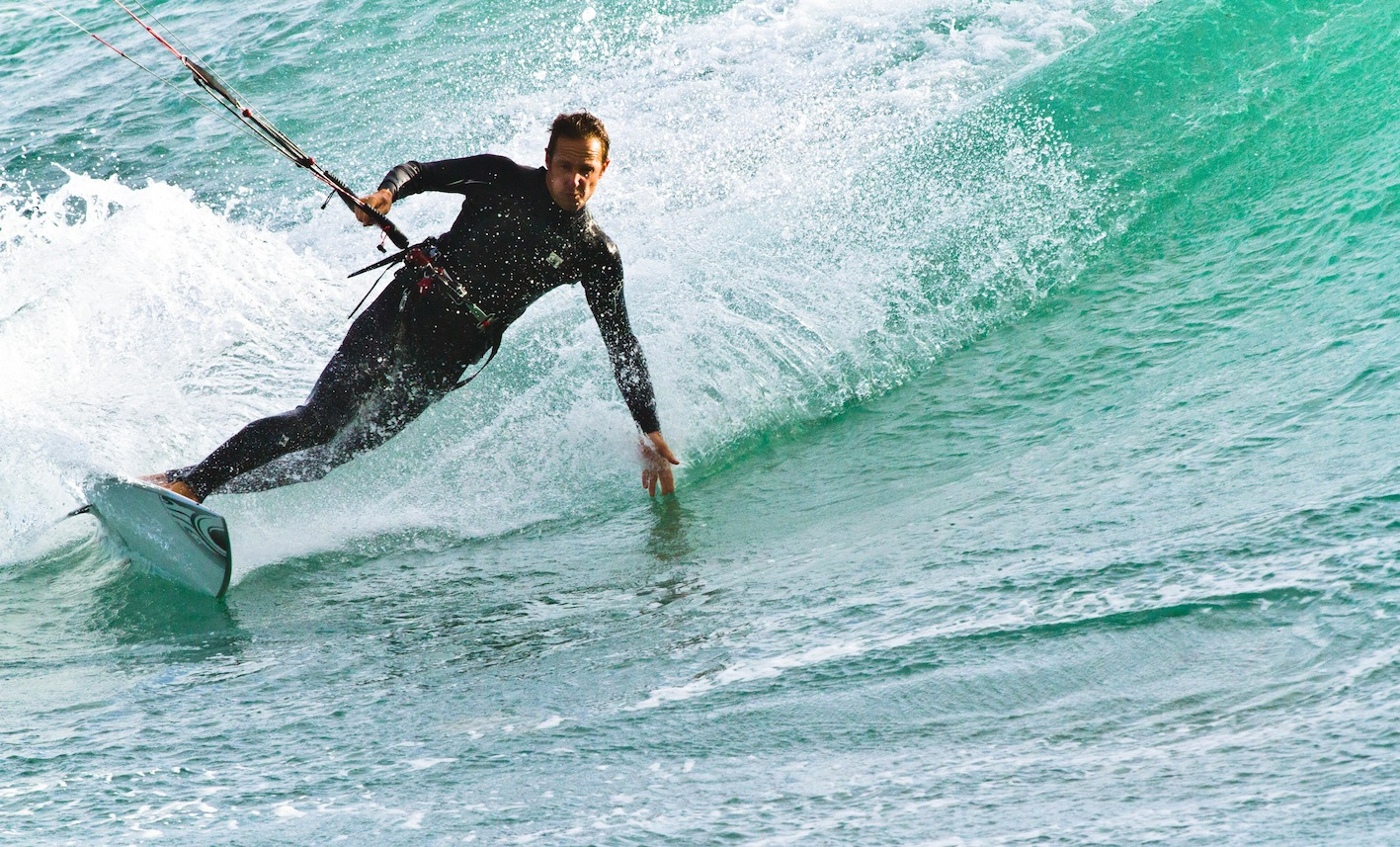
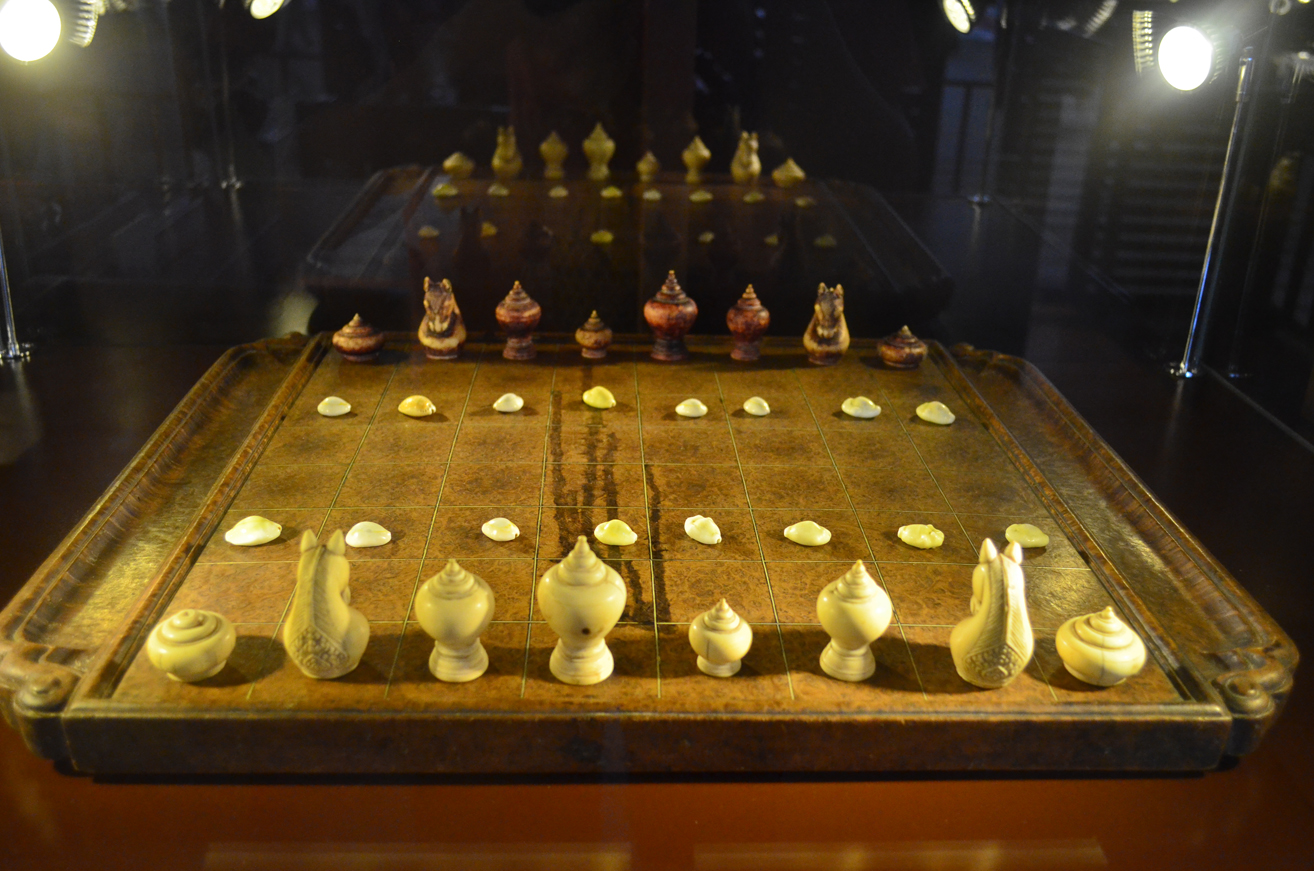
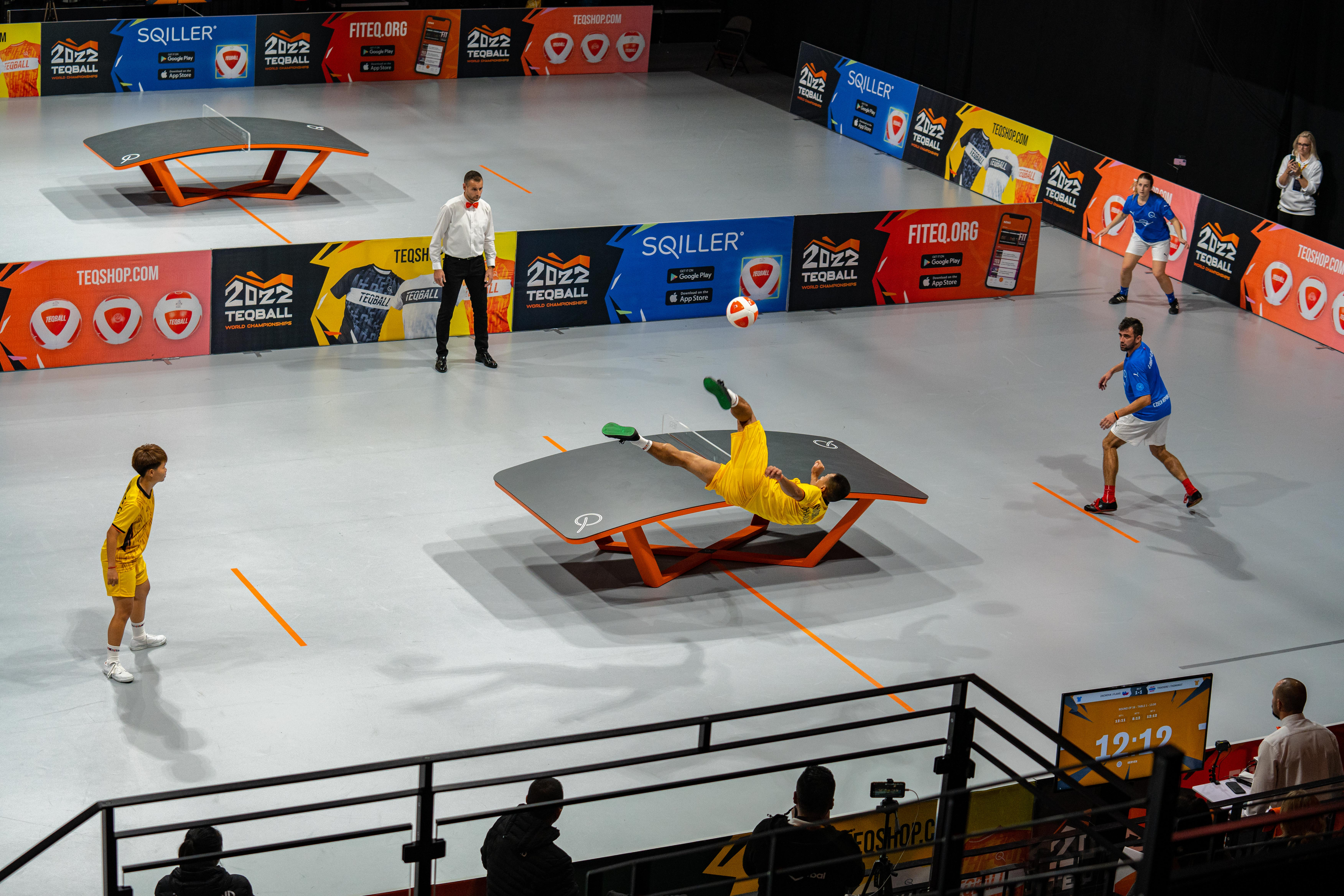
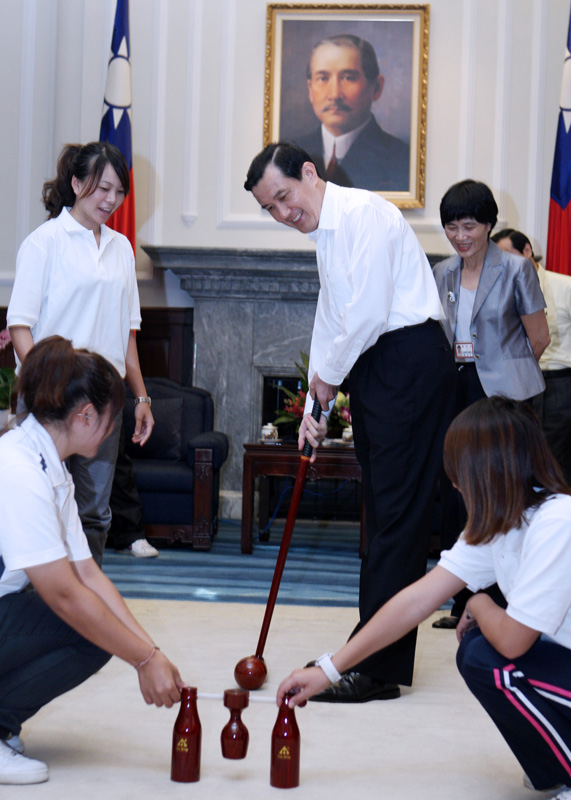
Nine of the ten debutants: baseball5, canoe slalom, coastal rowing, hockey5s, kabaddi, kiteboarding, makruk, teqball, and woodball.
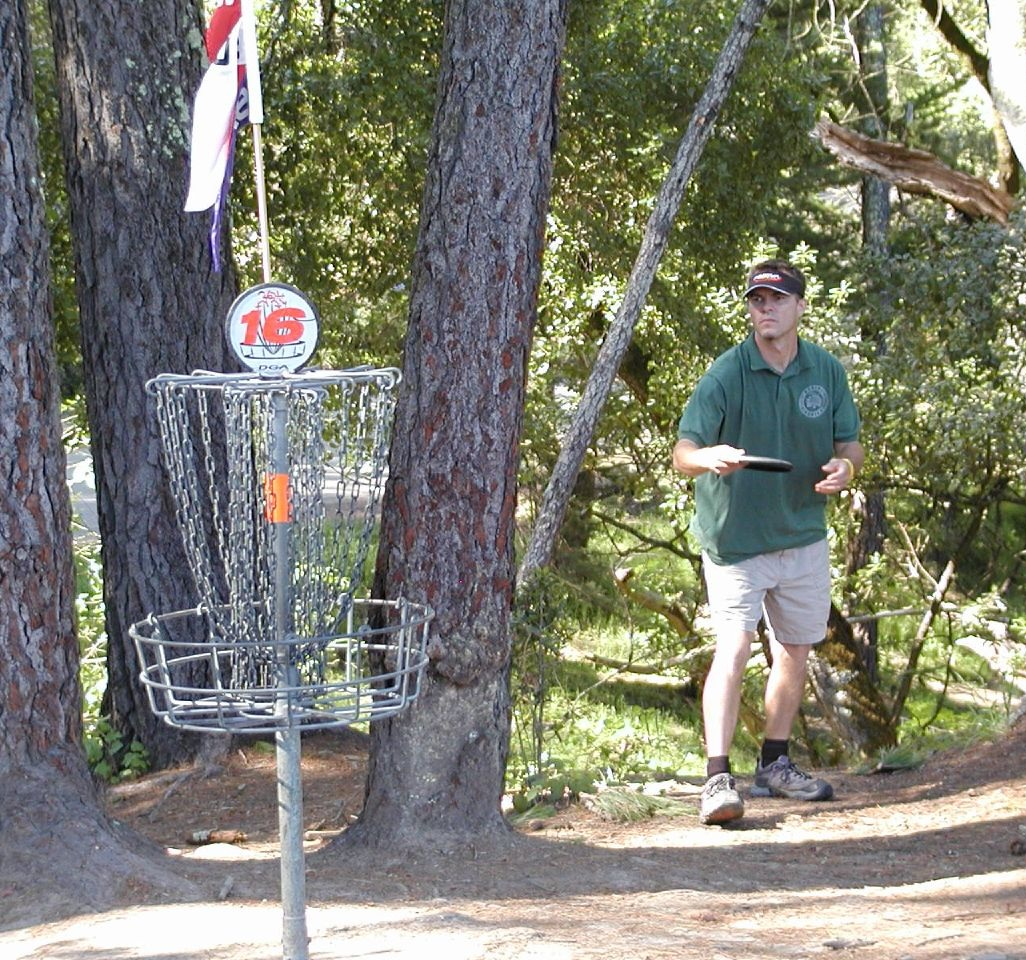
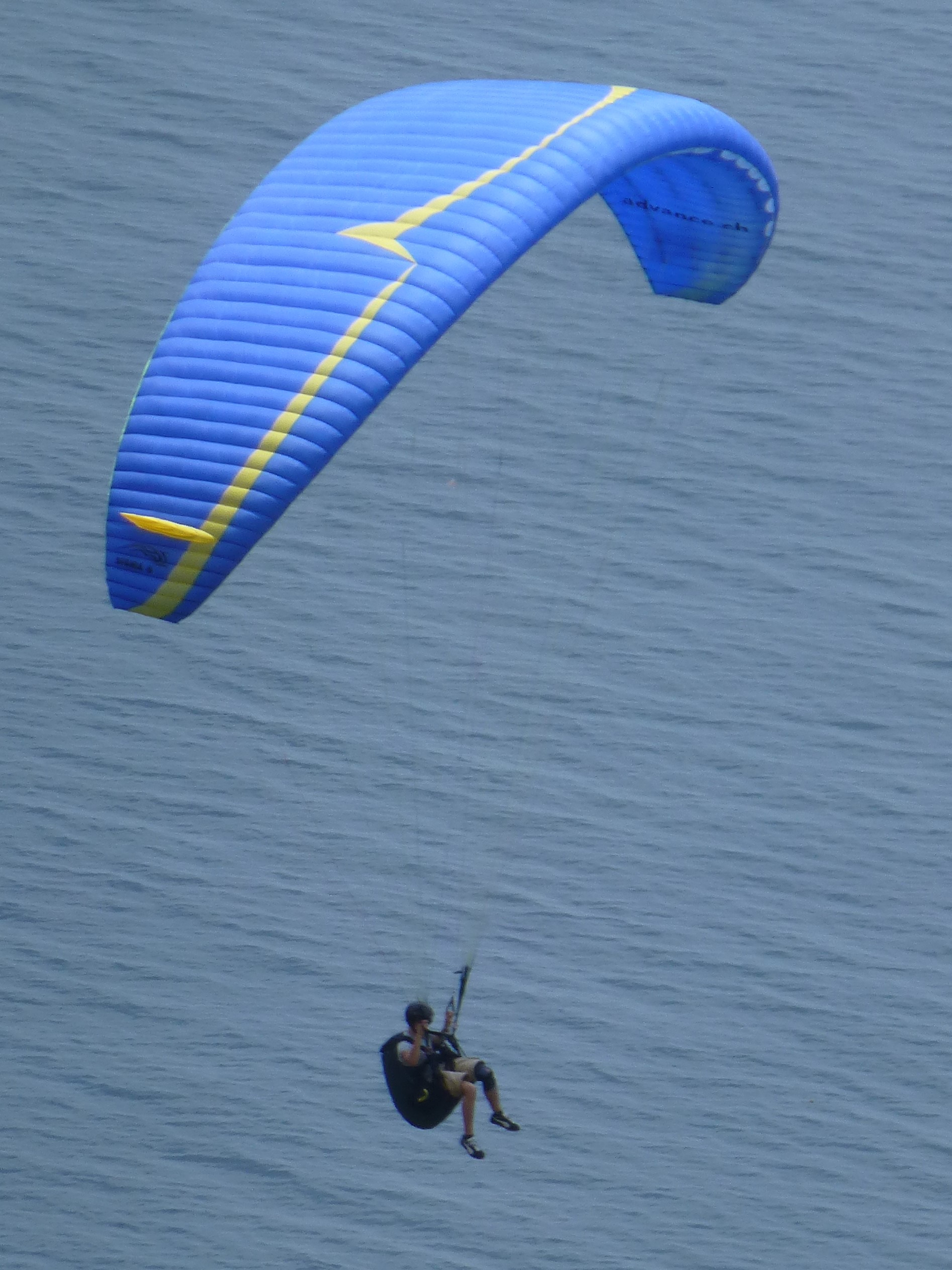
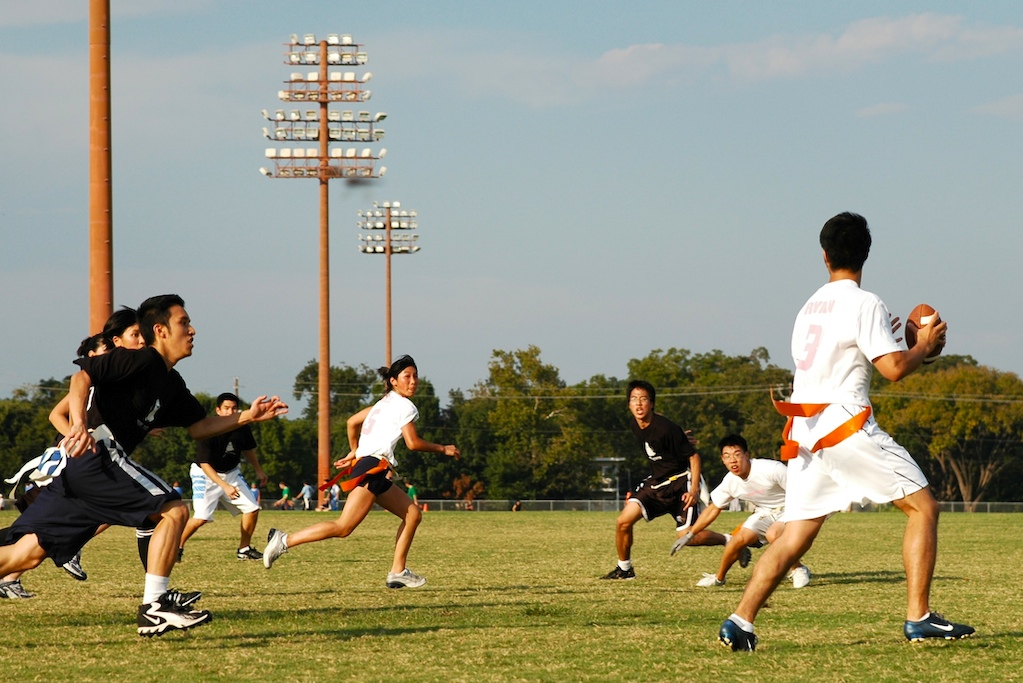
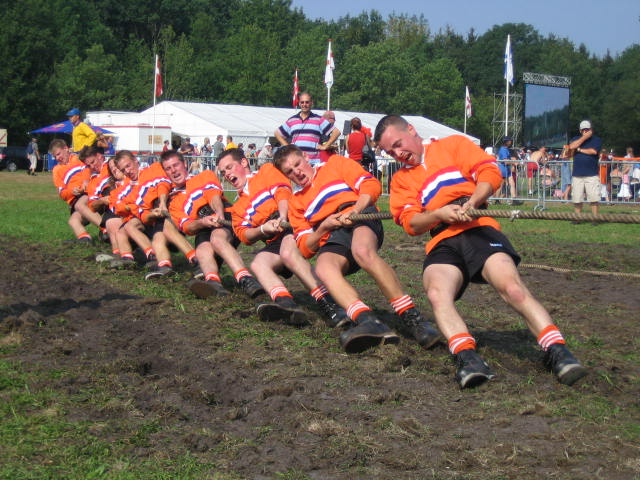
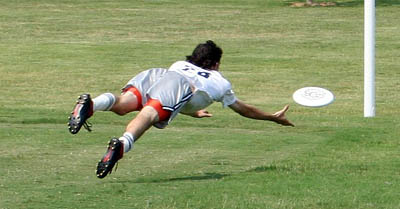
Six of the demonstrations: disc golf, paragliding, flag football, paramotor, tug of war, and ultimate frisbee.

==== Charter and Rules amendment ====
Over the years, the SEA Games programme has faced criticism for being a "gold-medal mine" for host countries. Hosts have had the freedom to exclude Olympic and Asian Games sports that are disadvantageous to them while including non-Olympic sports or events that increase their medal chances. In some extreme cases, obscure sports have been selected to give the host country an advantage.

To avoid the situations seen in recent editions of the SEA Games, Thailand proposed a series of amendments to Section 34 of the SEAGF Charter and Rules during the 2013 edition. Although the Charter and Rules have been amended multiple times since then, host countries were still allowed to allocate their optional sports programmes without oversight from the SEAGF. However, following the controversy surrounding the sports programme in recent editions, the host countries for the three editions between 2025 and 2029—Thailand, Malaysia, and Singapore—agreed to propose further amendments to the Charter and Rules. The new amendments were unanimously approved by SEAGF members at the SEAGF Council meeting during the 2023 SEA Games. The 2025 edition was the first to implement the new rules.

Section 34 of the amended SEAGF Charter and Rules stipulates that, starting with the 2025 edition, the SEA Games programme will include between 36 and 41 sports. This will consist of 12 compulsory sports under Category I, which are included in both the Olympic and Asian Games, a minimum of 25 Olympic and Asian Games sports under Category II, and a maximum of four additional sports under Category III. The medal events in Categories I and II must align with the Olympic and Asian Games programmes, while Category III sports cannot have more than eight events, which must be selected from a list established a few years in advance.

==== Sports selection ====
Following the selection of the host cities, the Sports Authority of Thailand (SAT) initially announced that the 2025 SEA Games would feature forty-three sports, in accordance with the Games' charter. All of these sports are included in the Thailand National Games, and the host cities and provinces are equipped to provide the necessary venues and facilities to accommodate these events. Under this plan, Teqball would make its debut at the 2025 SEA Games.

2025 SEA Games sports programme (first shortlists)

- Aquatics
  - Artistic swimming
  - Diving
  - Open water swimming
  - Swimming
  - Water polo
- Archery
- Athletics
- Badminton
- Basketball
- Billiard
- Boxing
- Cycling
- Dancesport
- Equestrian
- Esports
- Fencing
- Field hockey
- Figure skating
- Floorball
- Football
- Golf
- Gymnastics
- Ice hockey
- Judo
- Ju-jitsu
- Kabaddi
- Karate
- Kurash
- Muaythai
- Netball
- Pencak silat
- Pétanque
- Roller skiing
- Rowing
- Sailing
- Sepak takraw
- Shooting
- Short-track speed skating
- Soft tennis
- Table tennis
- Taekwondo
- Tennis
- Teqball
- Volleyball
- Weightlifting
- Wrestling
- Wushu

During the first SEAGF Council meeting for the 2025 SEA Games in June 2024, the organising committee proposed hosting forty sports, and the member countries agreed to finalise a second shortlist for the sports programme.

2025 SEA Games sports programme (second shortlists)

- Aquatics
  - Artistic swimming
  - Diving
  - Open water swimming
  - Swimming
  - Water polo
- Archery
- Athletics
- Badminton
- Baseball and softball
  - Baseball
  - Softball
- Basketball
  - Basketball
  - 3x3 basketball
- Billiards and snooker
  - Billiard
  - Snooker
- Boxing
- Canoeing
- Cycling
- Equestrian and polo
  - Equestrian
  - Polo
- Esports
- Fencing
- Field hockey
- Floorball
- Football
- Golf
- Gymnastics
- Handball
- Ice hockey
- Ice skating
  - Figure skating
  - Short-track speed skating
- Judo
- Kickboxing
- Modern pentathlon
- Muaythai
- Netball
- Pencak silat
- Pétanque
- Rowing
- Rugby sevens
- Sailing
- Sepak takraw
- Shooting
- Triathlon
- Table tennis
- Taekwondo
- Tennis
- Teqball
- Volleyball
- Wrestling

After the 2021 Asian Indoor and Martial Arts Games in Bangkok and Chonburi were cancelled on 20 August 2024 due to the organisers' failure to meet obligations, local athletes affected by the cancellation were given the chance to compete in other international tournaments, including the 2025 SEA Games. In September 2024, the sports programme was confirmed to include nine additional sports: ju-jitsu, karate, weightlifting, and wushu, all of which were reinstated. Other sports added included bowling, chess (including makruk), cricket, extreme sports, and squash.

2025 SEA Games sports programme (third shortlists)

- Aquatics
  - Artistic swimming
  - Diving
  - Open water swimming
  - Swimming
  - Water polo
- Archery
- Athletics
- Badminton
- Baseball and softball
  - Baseball
  - Softball
- Basketball
  - Basketball
  - 3x3 basketball
- Billiards and snooker
  - Billiard
  - Snooker
- Bowling
- Boxing
- Canoeing and rowing
  - Canoeing
  - Rowing
  - Dragon boat
- Chess
- Cricket
- Cycling
  - BMX
  - Mountain biking
  - Road
  - Track
- Equestrian and polo
  - Equestrian
  - Polo
- Esports
- Extreme sports
  - Jet ski
  - Skateboarding
  - Sport climbing
  - Water skiing
  - Wakeboarding
- Fencing
- Field hockey
- Floorball
- Football and futsal
  - Football
  - Futsal
- Golf
- Gymnastics
  - Aerobic
  - Artistic
  - Rhythmic
- Handball
- Ice hockey
- Ice skating
  - Figure skating
  - Short-track speed skating
- Judo
- Ju-jitsu
- Kabaddi
- Karate
- Kickboxing
- Modern pentathlon
- Muaythai
- Netball
- Pencak silat
- Pétanque
- Rugby sevens
- Sailing
  - Sailing
  - Kiteboarding
  - Windsurfing
- Sepak takraw and chinlone
  - Sepak takraw
  - Chinlone
- Shooting
- Squash
- Triathlon
- Table tennis
- Taekwondo
- Tennis
- Teqball
- Volleyball
  - Volleyball
  - Beach volleyball
- Weightlifting
- Woodball
- Wrestling
- Wushu

During the second SEAGF Council meeting for the 2025 SEA Games in October 2024, the organising committee finalised a sports programme featuring 569 medal events in fifty sports. Many traditional disciplines within these sports were included, such as the compound bow and recurve bow in archery; canoe sprint in canoeing; dressage, eventing, and show jumping in equestrian; épée, foil, and sabre in fencing; field hockey and indoor hockey in hockey; combat and kata in judo; ne-waza, fighting, and duo in ju-jitsu; kumite and kata in karate; ring and tatami in kickboxing; triathle and biathle in modern pentathlon; combat and waikru in muaythai; regu, quadrants, and hoop in sepak takraw; pistol, rifle, and shotgun in shooting; kyorugi and poomsae in taekwondo; duathlon and aquathlon in triathlon; freestyle wrestling and Greco-Roman wrestling in wrestling; and sanda as well as taolu in wushu.

Additionally, some disciplines were introduced for the first time, such as baseball5 in baseball, canoe slalom in canoeing, coastal rowing in rowing, hockey5s in hockey, and obstacle laser-run in modern pentathlon. Meanwhile, practical shooting made its return, having last been included in 2005. Furthermore, air sports (including paragliding and paramotor), flying disc (including disc golf and ultimate frisbee), and tug of war were featured as demonstration sports.

2025 SEA Games sports programme (finalists)

- Aquatics
  - Artistic swimming
  - Diving
  - Open water swimming
  - Swimming
  - Water polo
- Archery
  - Compound
  - Recurve
- Athletics
- Badminton
- Baseball and softball
  - Baseball
  - Baseball5
  - Softball
- Basketball
  - Basketball
  - 3x3 basketball
- Billiards and snooker
  - Billiards
  - Snooker
  - Six-red snooker
- Bowling
- Boxing
- Canoeing and rowing
  - Canoeing
  - Rowing
  - Dragon boat
- Chess
- Cricket
- Cycling
  - BMX
  - Mountain biking
  - Road
  - Track
- Equestrian
  - Dressage
  - Eventing
  - Show jumping
  - Polo
- Esports
- Extreme sports
  - Jet skiing
  - Skateboarding
  - Sport climbing
  - Water skiing /Wakeboarding
- Fencing
  - Épée
  - Foil
  - Sabre
- Floorball
- Football and futsal
  - Football
  - Futsal
- Golf
- Gymnastics
  - Aerobic
  - Artistic
  - Rhythmic
- Handball
- Hockey
  - Field hockey
  - Hockey5s
  - Indoor hockey
- Ice hockey
- Ice skating
  - Figure skating
  - Short-track speed skating
- Judo
  - Combat
  - Kata
- Ju-jitsu
  - Ne-waza
  - Fighting
  - Duo
- Kabaddi
- Karate
  - Kumite
  - Kata
- Kickboxing
  - Ring
  - Tatami
- Modern pentathlon
  - Triathle
  - Biathle
  - Obstacle laser-run
- Muaythai
  - Combat
  - Waikru
- Netball
- Pencak silat
  - Tanding
  - Seni
- Pétanque
- Rugby sevens
- Sailing
  - Sailing
  - Kiteboarding
  - Windsurfing
- Sepak takraw
  - Regu
  - Quadrant
  - Hoop
  - Chinlone
- Shooting
  - Pistol and rifle
  - Shotgun
  - Practical shooting
- Squash
- Table tennis
- Taekwondo
  - Kyorugi
  - Poomsae
- Tennis
- Teqball
- Triathlon
  - Triathlon
  - Aquathlon
  - Duathlon
- Volleyball
  - Volleyball
  - Beach volleyball
- Weightlifting
- Woodball
- Wrestling
  - Freestyle
  - Greco-Roman
- Wushu
  - Sanda
  - Taolu

2025 SEA Games sports programme (demonstration events)

- Air sports
  - Paragliding
  - Paramotoring
- Flying disc
  - Disc golf
  - Ultimate
- Tug of war

During the third SEAGF Council meeting for the 2025 SEA Games in December 2024, the organising committee replaced ten medal events from the finalist list announced in October 2024 with new events across various sports, including dragon boat, rhythmic gymnastics, judo, esports, pencak silat, and woodball. Additionally, one medal event was removed from mountain biking, while six new medal events were introduced in athletics, road cycling, and sailing. As a result, the total number of events increased to 574, still falling short of the previous record of 580 set at the 2023 SEA Games in Phnom Penh, Cambodia. One medal event in sailing was later cancelled, bringing the final number of events to 573.

During the first SEAGF coordination committee meeting for the 2025 SEA Games in February 2025, the organising committee approved the inclusion of mixed martial arts (MMA) in the Games, following a request from the SEA Games Federation. It was added under a new category described as value creation sports. This decision arose from an agreement among Thailand, Malaysia, and Singapore—the hosts of upcoming SEA Games—which mandates that only sports featured in the current edition can be included in future events. Therefore, MMA was introduced to secure its eligibility for future competitions. However, it will not contribute to the official medal tally, as it is designated as a demonstration sport.

==== Sports programme ====
The fifty-sport programme of the 2025 SEA Games surprised the Olympic Council of Asia (OCA) by including the most internationally recognised sports, with 49 out of the 50 sports also contested in the Olympic Games, Asian Games, and Asian Indoor and Martial Arts Games. This marked a historic first for the SEA Games.

Surfing was the only core Summer Olympic sport to not be included in these Games. Canoeing and rowing, as well as skateboarding and sport climbing, were combined into single categories, reducing the total count to twenty-eight sports. Additionally, two Winter Olympic sports were featured: ice hockey and ice skating, with figure skating and short-track speed skating categorised together. Furthermore, three optional sports for the 2028 Summer Olympics—baseball/softball, cricket, and squash—were also included, bringing the total number of Olympic sports in these Games to thirty-three.

Moreover, six sports included in the programme of the 2026 Asian Games—esports, jujitsu, kabaddi, karate, sepak takraw, and wushu—were added. In addition, twelve sports that were originally planned for the cancelled 2021 Asian Indoor and Martial Arts Games were also incorporated, including billiards/snooker, bowling, chess, floorball, futsal, indoor hockey, kickboxing, muaythai, netball, pencak silat, pétanque, and teqball. However, futsal and indoor hockey were categorised under their respective parent sports of football and hockey, reducing the count of these additional sports to ten.

Ten sports—aquathlon, baseball5, chinlone, dragon boat, duathlon, hockey5s, jet skiing, practical shooting, water skiing/wakeboarding, and woodball—were not included in the Olympic and Asian Games, nor the cancelled Asian Indoor and Martial Arts Games, but were featured in the upcoming World Games and Youth Olympic Games, as well as in past Asian Games and SEA Games. Baseball5 and hockey5s are categorised under their parent sports, baseball and hockey, respectively, while aquathlon and duathlon are categorised under triathlon. Dragon boat, jet skiing and water skiing/wakeboarding, chinlone, and practical shooting fall under related sports such as canoeing and rowing, extreme sports, sepak takraw, and shooting, respectively, while woodball is the only independent sport included.

Numbers in parentheses indicate the number of medal events contested in each discipline.

2025 SEA Games sports programme (medal events)

- Aquatics (Note: Designated under category IA for two compulsory sports: aquatics and athletics (consisting of 2 sports).)
  - Artistic swimming (3)
  - Diving (4)
  - Open water swimming (3)
  - Swimming (38)
  - Water polo (2)
- Archery (Note: Designated under category IB for compulsory sports featured in the Summer Olympic Games and the Winter Olympic Games (consisting of 26 sports).)
  - Compound (5)
  - Recurve (5)
- Athletics (47)
- Badminton (7)
- Baseball and softball (Note: Designated under category II for optional sports featured in the Summer Olympic Games, the Winter Olympic Games, the Asian Games, and the Asian Indoor and Martial Arts Games (consisting of 18 sports).)
  - Baseball (1)
  - Baseball5 (1)
  - Softball (2)
- Basketball
  - Basketball (2)
  - 3x3 basketball (2)
- Billiards and snooker
  - Billiards (2)
  - Snooker (4)
  - Six-red snooker (4)
- Bowling (6)
- Boxing (17)
- Canoeing and rowing
  - Canoeing (12) (Note: Designated as one category of sport, canoeing and rowing are distinct disciplines governed by separate international bodies. Canoeing, which includes canoe sprint, canoe slalom, and its discipline dragon boat, is governed by the International Canoe Federation (ICF). Rowing, encompassing classic rowing and coastal rowing, is governed by World Rowing (WR).)
  - Rowing (10)
  - Dragon boat (8)
- Chess (8) (Note: Designated under category III for optional sports featured in the other events, including chess, kickboxing, and teqball, which were included in the Asian Indoor and Martial Arts Games but were placed in this category by the host instead of Category II. (consisting of 4 sports).)
- Cricket (4)
- Cycling
  - BMX (2)
  - Mountain biking (3)
  - Road (7)
  - Track (5)
- Equestrian (Note: Designated as one type of sport, equestrian is governed by the International Federation for Equestrian Sports (FEI), while polo is governed by the Federation of International Polo (FIP).)
  - Dressage (2)
  - Eventing (2)
  - Show jumping (2)
  - Polo (2)
- Esports (6)
- Extreme sports
  - Jet skiing (6) (Note: Designated as a category of extreme sports, jet skiing is governed by the International Jet Sports Boating Association (IJSBA), skateboarding by World Skate (WS), sport climbing by the International Federation of Sport Climbing (IFSC), and water skiing and wakeboarding by the International Waterski & Wakeboard Federation (IWWF).)
  - Skateboarding (4)
  - Sport climbing (6)
  - Water skiing and wakeboarding (4)
- Fencing
  - Épée (4)
  - Foil (4)
  - Sabre (4)
- Floorball (2)
- Football and futsal
  - Football (2)
  - Futsal (2)
- Golf (4)
- Gymnastics
  - Aerobic (2)
  - Artistic (10)
  - Rhythmic (4)
- Handball (2)
- Hockey
  - Field hockey (2)
  - Hockey5s (2)
  - Indoor hockey (2)
- Ice hockey (2)
- Ice skating
  - Figure skating (2)
  - Short-track speed skating (7)
- Judo
  - Combat (10)
  - Kata (2)
- Ju-jitsu
  - Ne-waza (7)
  - Fighting (4)
  - Duo (7)
- Kabaddi (6)
- Karate (15)
  - Kumite (13)
  - Kata (2)
- Kickboxing
  - Ring (5)
  - Tatami (3)
- Modern pentathlon
  - Triathle (2)
  - Biathle (2)
  - Obstacle laser-run (2)
- Muaythai
  - Combat (16)
  - Waikru (2)
- Netball (1)
- Pencak silat
  - Tanding (10)
  - Seni (3)
- Pétanque (11)
- Rugby sevens (2)
- Sailing
  - Sailing (8)
  - Kiteboarding (2)
  - Windsurfing (4)
- Sepak takraw (Note: Designated as one type of sport, sepak takraw is governed by the International Sepaktakraw Federation (ISTAF), while chinlone currently lacks an international governing body.)
  - Regu (4)
  - Quadrant (3)
  - Hoop (2)
  - Chinlone (2)
- Shooting (Note: Designated as one type of sport, shooting is governed by the International Shooting Sport Federation (ISSF), while practical shooting is governed by the International Practical Shooting Confederation (IPSC).)
  - Pistol and rifle (16)
  - Shotgun (6)
  - Practical shooting (8)
- Squash (4)
- Table tennis (7)
- Taekwondo
  - Kyorugi (14)
  - Poomsae (6)
- Tennis (7)
- Teqball (5)
- Triathlon
  - Triathlon (5)
  - Aquathlon (3)
  - Duathlon (3)
- Volleyball
  - Volleyball (2)
  - Beach volleyball (2)
- Weightlifting (14)
- Woodball (6)
- Wrestling
  - Freestyle (8)
  - Greco-Roman (4)
- Wushu
  - Sanda (4)
  - Taolu (10)

2025 SEA Games sports programme (demonstration events)

- Air sports
  - Paragliding (3)
  - Paramotoring (1)
- Flying disc
  - Disc golf (2)
  - Ultimate (1)
- Tug of war (5)

2025 SEA Games sports programme (value creation events)
- Mixed martial arts (6)

=== Closing ceremony ===
The closing ceremony of the 2025 SEA Games was held on 20 December 2025 at Rajamangala Stadium, Bangkok. The SEAGF flag was handed over to Malaysia, the host country of the 2027 edition. The handover segment included performances by Malaysia artistes Marsha Milan, Amir Jahari, and Mimifly.

== Participating National Olympic Committees ==
All eleven National Olympic Committee (NOC) members of the Southeast Asian Games Federation (SEAGF) took part in the games. Since its debut in 2003, Timor-Leste participated for the first time as a full ASEAN member state, with its official access to the association since 26 October 2025.

Numbers in parentheses indicate the number of delegations representing in each NOC.

Participating National Olympic Committees
- Brunei (135)
- Cambodia (137)
- Indonesia (1,021)
- Laos (598)
- Malaysia (1,142)
- Myanmar (1,477)
- Philippines (1,168)
- Singapore (930)
- Thailand (1,807) (host)
- Timor-Leste (110)
- Vietnam (841)

WD: Cambodia initially planned to participate with a 333-member delegation across 21 sports; however, due to rising security concerns related to the Cambodian-Thai border tensions, the National Olympic Committee of Cambodia (NOCC) later reduced the contingent to 150 athletes, coaches, and officials competing in 13 sports. On 10 December 2025, one day after the opening ceremony, Cambodia announced the complete withdrawal of its delegation from the Games, citing escalating border clashes and safety fears expressed by athletes’ families. Despite the withdrawal, around 30 Cambodian athletes and officials had already taken part in the opening ceremony on 9 December, but the delegation exited the competition before any events began.

=== Athlete eligibility rules ===
During the Chef de Mission meeting in August 2025, the Organizing Committee confirmed that gender verification tests would be conducted for athletes. The procedures and methods for testing are determined by each individual sports federation, as the SEAGF operate independently and are not governed by the Olympic Council of Asia (OCA). All regulations regarding testing are set by the Organizing Committee.

In addition, strict passport verification was implemented for all athletes. This came in response to incidents at the 2023 SEA Games, where some Cambodian naturalized athletes competed using documents other than their national passports, with certificates issued by their respective nations allowing participation. For the 2025 Games, athlete documentation was to be thoroughly checked upon entry into Thailand, during the competition, and upon departure. Any cases of document falsification or attempts to field athletes representing countries other than their own would result in immediate action, preventing such violations from occurring during this edition of the Games.

== Calendar ==
In the following calendar for the 2025 SEA Games, each blue box represents an event competition, such as a qualification round, on that day. The yellow boxes represent days during which medal-awarding finals for a sport were held. On the left, the calendar lists each sport with events held during the Games, and at the right how many gold medals were won in that sport.

All times and dates use Thailand Standard Time (UTC+7)

OC	Opening ceremony	●	Event competitions	1	Gold medal events	CC	Closing ceremony

December 2025		3rd Wed	4th Thu	5th Fri	6th Sat	7th Sun	8th Mon	9th Tue	10th Wed	11th Thu	12th Fri	13th Sat	14th Sun	15th Mon	16th Tue	17th Wed	18th Thu	19th Fri	20th Sat	Events
Ceremonies								OC											CC	—N/a
Aquatics	Artistic swimming								●	●	2	1								3
Aquatics	Diving															1	1	2		4
Aquatics	Open water swimming																2		1	3
Aquatics	Swimming								6	7	6	6	6	7						38
Aquatics	Water polo													●	●	●	●	2		2
Archery	Compound												●	●	●	●	5			5
Archery	Recurve												●	●	●	5				5
Athletics										8	8	7	4	10	10					47
Badminton						●	●		2	●	●	●	5							7
Baseball and softball	Baseball			●	●	●	●	●	●	●	1									1
Baseball and softball	Baseball5									●	●	●	1							1
Baseball and softball	Softball								●	●	●	1		●	●	●	1			2
Basketball	Basketball											●	●	●	●	●	●	2		2
Basketball	3x3 basketball								●	2										2
Billiards and snooker	Billiards								●	●	●	1	●	●	●	1				2
Billiards and snooker	Snooker								●	1	●	1		●	●	2				4
Billiards and snooker	Six-red snooker								●	1	●	1		●	●	2				4
Bowling													1	1	1	1	●	2		6
Boxing									●	●	●	●	●	●	●	●		17		17
Canoeing and rowing	Canoeing (sprint)								4	3	3									10
Canoeing and rowing	Canoeing (slalom)								1	2										3
Canoeing and rowing	Rowing (classic)												●	●	4	4				8
Canoeing and rowing	Rowing (coastal)																	2		2
Canoeing and rowing	Dragon boat																3	3		6
Chess									1	●	●	1		●	2	1	●	3		8
Cricket								●	●	●	1	1		●	●	●	1	1		4
Cycling	BMX									1	1									2
Cycling	Mountain biking								2	1										3
Cycling	Road cycling												2	2	2	1				7
Cycling	Track cycling																2	3		5
Equestrian	Dressage												1	●	1					2
Equestrian	Eventing											2								2
Equestrian	Jumping															●	●	2		2
Equestrian	Polo	●	●		●		●		1		●	●		●		●		1		2
Esports												●	●	●	2	2	1	1		6
Extreme sports	Jet skiing									●	●	1	5							6
Extreme sports	Skateboarding								●	●	●	2	2							4
Extreme sports	Sport climbing											●	2	2	●	2				6
Extreme sports	Water skiing & wakeboarding								●	3			●	1						4
Fencing															3	3	3	3		12
Floorball												●	●	●	●	●	●	2		2
Football and futsal	Football	●	●	●	●	●	●		●	●	●		●	●		1	1			2
Football and futsal	Futsal										●	●	●	●	●	●	1	1		2
Golf										●	●	●	4							4
Gymnastics	Aerobic																●	2		2
Gymnastics	Artistic								●	5	5									10
Gymnastics	Rhythmic													1	3					4
Handball							●		●	●	●	●	●	●		2				2
Hockey	Field hockey											●	●	●	●	●	●	2		2
Hockey	Hockey5s					●	●		●	●	2									2
Hockey	Indoor hockey											●	●	●	●	●	●	2		2
Ice hockey									●	●	●	●	1	●	●	●	●	1		2
Ice skating	Figure skating										●	2								2
Ice skating	Short-track speed skating															●	1	6		7
Judo										2	4	5	1							12
Ju-jitsu	Ne-waza									4	3									7
Ju-jitsu	Fighting								4											4
Ju-jitsu	Duo								2	2	2	1								7
Kabaddi										●	●	●	2	●	2	●	2			6
Karate										4	5	4	2							15
Kickboxing	Ring											●	●	●	5					5
Kickboxing	Tatami											●	●	3						3
Modern pentathlon																2	2	2		6
Muaythai												●	●	●	●	18				18
Netball											●	●	●	●	●	1				1
Pencak silat	Tanding													●	●	10				10
Pencak silat	Seni											●	3							3
Pétanque									2	2	2	1	2	2						11
Rugby sevens												●	2							2
Sailing	Sailing								●	●	●	●	7	●	●	●	1			8
Sailing	Kiteboarding												●	●	●	1				1
Sailing	Windsurfing										●	●	●		●	●	4			4
Sepak takraw								●	4	●	●	●	2	●	1	●	2	●	2	11
Shooting	Pistol and rifle								●	●	1	2	4	1	●	4	●	4		16
Shooting	Shotgun									●	2	●	1	●	1	●	2			6
Shooting	Practical shooting											●	●	8						8
Squash													●	2	●	●	●	2		4
Table tennis											●	●	2		●	3	●	2		7
Taekwondo									6	4	5	5								20
Tennis									●	●	●	2	●	●	●	●	2	3		7
Teqball									●	●	●	5								5
Triathlon	Triathlon															3		2		5
Triathlon	Aquathlon																3			3
Triathlon	Duathlon														3					3
Volleyball	Volleyball								●	●	●	●	●	1	●	●	●	1		2
Volleyball	Beach volleyball										●	●	●	●	●	●	●	2		2
Weightlifting												3	3	3	3	2				14
Woodball									●	●	2	2	2							6
Wrestling	Freestyle																4	4		8
Wrestling	Greco-Roman															4				4
Wushu												2	2	10						14
Daily medal events		0	0	0	0	0	0	0	35	52	55	60	64	59	43	76	43	83	3	573
Cumulative total		0	0	0	0	0	0	0	32	87	142	202	266	325	368	444	487	570	573	573
Demonstration and value creation events
Air sports	Paragliding									●	●	3								3
Air sports	Paramotoring													●	●	●	1			1
Flying disc	Disc golf														●	●	2			2
Flying disc	Ultimate														●	1				1
Tug of war															5					5
Mixed martial arts									●	6										6
December 2025		3rd Wed	4th Thu	5th Fri	6th Sat	7th Sun	8th Mon	9th Tue	10th Wed	11th Thu	12th Fri	13th Sat	14th Sun	15th Mon	16th Tue	17th Wed	18th Thu	19th Fri	20th Sat	Events

== Medal table ==
* Host nation (Thailand)

2025 SEA Games medal table
Rank	Nation	Gold	Silver	Bronze	Total
1	Thailand*	233	154	113	500
2	Indonesia	91	112	130	333
3	Vietnam	87	81	110	278
4	Malaysia	57	57	117	231
5	Singapore	52	61	89	202
6	Philippines	50	73	154	277
7	Myanmar	3	21	49	73
8	Laos	2	9	27	38
9	Brunei	1	3	5	9
10	Timor-Leste	0	1	7	8
Totals (10 entries)		576	572	801	1,949

== Broadcasting rights ==
2025 SEA Games television broadcasters in Southeast Asia
Country	Broadcaster	TV	Radio	Online	Ref.
Brunei	Astro	Astro Arena		Astro Go, Sooka	
Indonesia	MNC Media	RCTI, MNCTV, GTV, iNews, Sportstars		Vision+	
Philippines	Cignal TV	TV5, One Sports, One Sports+, RPTV	Radio Philippines Network	Cignal Play, Cignal Super, Pilipinas Live	
Malaysia	Radio Televisyen Malaysia, Sarawak Media Group, Astro	TV Okey, Sukan RTM, TVS, Astro Arena		RTMKlik, TVS Inspire, Astro Go, Sooka	
Myanmar	Forever Group, Myanmar Radio and Television, HEY Play	MRTV-4, Channel 7, Readers Channel, MRTV Sports (HTV Sports Channel), MRTV, MRTV Entertainment	Pyone Play	Pyone Play, MRTV	
Singapore	Mediacorp	Channel 5		MeWatch	
Thailand	NBT, T Sports 7, One 31, Thairath TV, PPTV HD 36, TrueVisions	NBT, T Sports 7, One 31, Thairath TV, PPTV HD 36	MCOT Radio Network, NBT Radio	TrueVisions Now	
Vietnam	FPT, VTV, VTC, THVL, HTV, MyTV, VTVCab, Hanoi Radio Television, TV360	VTV2, VTV5, VTV7, VTV Cần Thơ, VTV5 Tây Nam Bộ, THVL3, THVL4, ON Sports, ON Sports News, ON Sports+, ON Football, ON Golf, HTV1, HTV3, HTV Key, HTV7, HTV9, HTV Thể Thao, HanoiTV1, HanoiTV2	VOH	FPT Play, VTVgo, THVLi, VTVprime, MyTV, HTVm, VTV Thể Thao (YouTube), Hà Nội ON, TV360	

== Marketing ==
=== Design competition ===
The Sport Authority of Thailand (SAT) originally organised a design competition for the emblem, motto, and mascot for the 2025 SEA Games and the 2025 ASEAN Para Games. The submitted designs were required to be visually appealing, modern, unique, and reflect Thai identity. The submission period was from 20 September to 25 October 2023. The official awarding ceremony took place at the Chaloem Phrakiat Building at the Hua Mak Sports Complex in Bangkok on 23 November 2023.

=== Emblem ===
The official emblem for the 2025 SEA Games, designed by Teeranop Wangsillapakun, the creative director and founder of TNOP Design, was commissioned by the Design Subcommittee of the Thailand Creative Culture Agency under the National Soft Power Strategy Committee.

This emblem replaced an earlier design selected through a competition. The initial emblem, created by Ruengwit Phutharaporn, was inspired by the pla kat, or Siamese fighting fish, Thailand's national aquatic animal.

=== Motto ===
The official motto for the 2025 SEA Games, Ever Forward (Thai: ก้าวไปข้างหน้าไม่หยุดยั้ง, RTGS: Kaopai Khangna Mai Yutyang, pronounced [kâːwː.pāj kʰâːŋ.nâː mâj jùt.jáŋ]), replaced the previous winning slogan from a design competition, Amity of ASEAN, designed by Phonchit Sachaiyan. Notably, it bears a resemblance to the motto of the Asian Games, Ever Onward, which was established by Guru Dutt Sondhi, the founder of the games.

=== Mascots ===
The San (from left to right: Put, Suk, Angkan, Chan, Arthit), the official mascots of the Games.

The official mascots for the 2025 SEA Games, designed by Teeranop Wangsillapakun, the creative director and founder of TNOP Design, were commissioned by the Design Subcommittee of the Thailand Creative Culture Agency (THACCA) under the National Soft Power Strategy Committee.

The mascots consisted of a group of five characters called The San, in red, green, pink, yellow, and blue, representing the diversity of Thai society. Each character was designed using geometric patterns inspired by the structural lines of traditional Thai motifs, blending modernity with Thai identity. Together, they symbolized celebration, creativity, cultural connection, and the promotion of diversity in sports and society.

On 7 October 2025, a new version of The San was revealed; the number of mascots was reduced to one, with Chan being retained. It was also recolored to the Thai flag to represent national pride. The original five San designs were retained for merchandise.

These mascots replaced an earlier design selected through a competition. The initial mascot, named Mawin, was designed by Tawich Jitthiang and depicted a Waree Kunchorn, a mythical creature from the Himavanta. This creature has the body of an elephant, along with fish-like features, including fins along its backbone, leg fins attached to each of its four legs, and a fishtail.

=== Sponsors ===
Sponsors of the 2025 SEA Games
Official Main Sponsors
- Charoen Pokphand
- CP Foods (CP Brand)
- CP Axtra (Lotus's, Makro)* CP All (7-Eleven)
- True Corporation
Official Gold Sponsors
- Ajinomoto
- Central Group (Central Pattana)
- Daikin
- Major Cineplex
- Precious Time Trading
- Provita
- Roojai Insurance
- TikTok
Official Silver Sponsors
- Airports of Thailand
- Biodegradable Packaging for Environment (Gracz)
- Grand Sport Group
- Sports Mall
- Sushiro
- ThaiNamthip (Coca-Cola)
- Yamaha Motor Company (Fazzio Hybrid)
Official Bronze Sponsors
- Nestlé (Milo)
- SpaceGym
- TAGTHAi
- ThaiBev

=== Theme song ===
The official theme song of the Games was "1%", performed by Violette Wautier alongside F.Hero in the Thai version and TWOPEE in the English version.

== Concerns and controversies ==
=== Officiating ===
Numerous allegations of biased officiating and missed calls were reported in multiple sports. In pencak silat, one of Malaysia's coaches assaulted a judge after Nor Farah binti Mazlan lost to Thailand's Chongthima Rueanthong in the quarterfinals of the women's Class B tanding event due to a tiebreaker rule, as both competitors ended with a 60–60 tie. However, the winner was decided due to the former's number of fouls. According to the Philippine Olympic Committee, the Filipino judge was safe after the assault and had filed a formal protest to the organizing committee.

The Association of Boxing Alliances in the Philippines (ABAP) noted multiple "hometown decisions" in favor of Thai boxers and disputed losses of Filipino and Filipina athletes. One notable example was the bout between Indonesia's Hasanah Huswatan and the Philippines' Nesthy Petecio in the semifinals of the women's 63 kg category, where Hasanah won in a 3–2 split decision that surprised both Thai and Filipino officials. ABAP also flagged Thailand's representation in the finals of 16 out of the 17 categories, which they described as "disproportionate." Thailand went on to win 14 gold medals in the sport. After the boxing event, ABAP revealed that they plan to have an inquiry with World Boxing, the sport's international federation on the irregularities during the tournament, which also affected other countries such as Singapore and Vietnam.

In the women's football final between Vietnam and the Philippines, the referee ruled out a goal by Nguyễn Thị Bích Thùy in the 29th minute for offside, despite claims of the attempt being clearly onside based on multiple replays, with some even showing up to three players not counting the goalkeeper standing below Bích Thùy. Similarly, the men's football bronze medal match saw Faris Danish of Malaysia commit a handball inside the penalty area that was not called by the referee, denying the Philippines a potential penalty. Due to both men's and women's tournaments not having a video assistant referee (VAR) system, both calls were upheld. The Filipinas would go on to defeat Vietnam on penalties and break their streak of four consecutive women's football gold medals, while Malaysia won bronze in the men's tournament.

=== Ban and reinstatement of pétanque ===
The Thailand Pétanque Association (PAT) was initially sanctioned by the World Pétanque and Bowls Federation (WPBF) and the Fédération Internationale de Pétanque et Jeu Provençal (FIPJP) due to issues regarding the association president's qualifications, which prevented Thai athletes from participating in international competitions. In response, the Sports Authority of Thailand (SAT) established a central committee to oversee athlete selection and organize pétanque for the 2025 SEA Games.

Conflicts arose over athlete selection, as the SAT continued to support athletes from the original association, delaying any resolution. In September 2025, WPBF and FIPJP formally banned the organization of pétanque events at the Games and announced that any nation sending athletes to compete would face a two-year suspension from all international competitions. Then, Pimol Srivikorn, President of the National Olympic Committee of Thailand (NOCT), and Chaiyapak Siriwat, Vice President of the NOCT, traveled to WPBF and FIPJP headquarters in Paris, France, to negotiate with WPBF and FIPJP to resolve the issue. Concurrently, Deputy Prime Minister Thamanat Prompow sent a letter affirming the Thai government's commitment to follow FIPJP guidelines and support the inclusion of pétanque in the 2025 SEA Games. The SAT also issued clarifications addressing prior communication errors that had caused misunderstandings. Following these actions, WPBF and FIPJP President Claude Azéma approved the inclusion of pétanque at the 2025 SEA Games, allowing the sport to proceed as planned.

=== Naming of muaythai competition ===
A debate arose regarding the naming of the combat sport, concerning the use of the term "muay" versus "muaythai". The issue gained public attention around August 2025 when Phai Lik, a member of the House of Respresentatives from Kamphaeng Phet and the president of the Kickboxing Association of Thailand (KAT), publicly urged organizers to confirm the use of the name "muaythai". He argued that the name had been recognized by the International Olympic Committee (IOC) and the International Federation of Muaythai Associations (IFMA), aligned with the government's soft power policy, and serves as an affirmation of national identity, particularly after Cambodia used the name "kun khmer" during its host year.

Subsequently, on September 10, 2025, Atthakorn Sirilatthayakorn, the Minister of Tourism and Sports (MOTS), addressed the issue in the House of Representatives, confirming that the government was proposing the matter to the Southeast Asian Games Federation (SEAGF) for consideration and to advocate for the official use of the term "muaythai".

However, in early October 2025, following reports that the Sports Authority of Thailand (SAT) was preparing to propose the name change, Chaiyapak Siriwat, CEO of the SEAGF, clarified on October 5, 2025, that the sport would retain the name "muay". He stated this name is stipulated in the SEA Games charter and cannot be altered, although he affirmed that the competition's operations and judging would be managed by IFMA and Thai officials.

=== Basketball player eligibility ===
Philippine Olympic Committee president Abraham Tolentino was frustrated on the organizers' inability to finalize the eligibility rules on the basketball tournament as of 28 November 2025, derailing the preparations of the Philippine national teams.

In August 2025, it was reported that players only needed to have the appropriate passport; however, this was only clarified in November. The Philippine Basketball Association submitted rosters assuming such rules were to be in effect over the standard FIBA eligibility rules.

On 24 November 2025, it was confirmed that naturalized players, alongside any other player who obtained the relevant passport after age 16, were not eligible to play in the standard 5x5 tournaments. This is stricter than the FIBA eligibility rules, which allow at least one player satisfying either criterion to be on a roster.

=== eSports cheating incident ===
Naphat Warasin, also known by the handle "Tokyogurl", was caught downloading an "unauthorized third-party software" during a team match between her team Thailand against Vietnam in the women's Arena of Valor match and was expelled from the tournament. The Thailand team withdrew from the tournament. A lifetime ban was imposed on Naphat by game publisher Garena while her talent agency terminated her contract. Thailand lost the game against Vietnam and was supposed to play the semifinals with Laos. Laos gained a bye to the gold medal match losing to Vietnam, while Timor-Leste, having lost every game they played, was awarded a bronze medal instantly.

=== National anthem errors ===
During the first match of the men's football game between Vietnam and Laos, a technical error prevented the national anthems of both teams from being played as scheduled at Rajamangala Stadium.

The governor of the Sports Authority of Thailand, Dr. Kongsak Yodmanee, acknowledged full responsibility for the mistake and expressed a “deepest apology” for the incident. The committee also ensured such issues would never happen again throughout the tournament.

=== Flag display errors ===
In the Games' official website, the organizing committee displayed the wrong flags for the futsal competition, where they used the Vietnamese flag to represent Thailand, while the Indonesian flag was replaced by Laos.

During the opening ceremony, a video clip with giant Singaporean flag card stunt was used when introducing the 1997 SEA Games held in Indonesia as part of the opening segment about the history of the SEA Games. While the video in question was taken from the actual footage of the opening ceremony, it was criticized by Indonesian viewers for misrepresenting the country as the host of the 1997 edition.

=== Political and diplomatic issues ===
==== Participation of Cambodian athletes ====
The potential participation of Cambodian athletes in the 2025 SEA Games became a subject of controversy amid the 2025 Cambodian–Thai border crisis. In July 2025, Sorawong Thienthong, Chairman of the Organizing Committee and Minister of Tourism and Sports at the time, suggested the possibility of banning Cambodia following a cross-border attack that resulted in Thai casualties. However, Chaiyapak Siriwat, President of the Southeast Asian Games Federation, emphasized that Thailand, as host of the SEA Games, had no authority to bar Cambodia nor any member nation from participating, as decisions must comply with the Olympic Charter, which upholds political neutrality, non-discrimination, and the right of all nations to compete.

Cambodia initially submitted an entry of 1,515 athletes and officials before the clashes, though reports later claimed the number had been reduced to 57. Vath Chamroeun, Secretary General of the National Olympic Committee of Cambodia, denied the reports, stating that Cambodia would send a larger contingent. At the Chef de Mission meeting in August 2025, Chaiyapak confirmed that Cambodia had registered around 600 athletes and more than 100 officials. Due to security concerns, however, the Organizing Committee requested that Cambodia reduce its delegation to no more than 200 athletes to ensure adequate safety arrangements. Following a second round of clashes on 8 December and their participation in the opening ceremony the next day, Cambodia withdrew all athletes from the competition on 10 December, citing political and safety concerns.

== See also ==
- 2025 ASEAN Para Games in Nakhon Ratchasima
- SEAP Games in Thailand:
  - 1959 SEAP Games in Bangkok
  - 1967 SEAP Games in Bangkok
  - 1975 SEAP Games in Bangkok
- SEA Games in Thailand:
  - 1985 SEA Games in Bangkok
  - 1995 SEA Games in Chiang Mai
  - 2007 SEA Games in Nakhon Ratchasima
- Asian Games in Thailand:
  - 1966 Asian Games in Bangkok
  - 1970 Asian Games in Bangkok
  - 1978 Asian Games in Bangkok
  - 1998 Asian Games in Bangkok, similar premise where Saudi Arabia boycotted from the event due to Blue Diamond Affair.

== Notes ==
Preceded by Phnom Penh	33rd SEA Games; Bangkok–Chonburi; 2025	Succeeded by Malaysia
