= Duathlon at the 2025 SEA Games =

- Venue: Laem Mae Phim Beach, Klaeng
- Location: Rayong, Thailand
- Dates: 18 December 2025
- Competitors: 48 from 7 nations

Duathlon competitions at the 2025 SEA Games took place at Laem Mae Phim Beach in Klaeng district, Rayong, Thailand at 18 December 2025. Medals were awarded in 3 events.

== Participating nations ==
- Cambodia (4) (withdrew)
- Indonesia (7)
- Malaysia (7)
- Philippines (6)
- Singapore (6)
- Thailand (10) (host)
- Vietnam (8)

== Medal table ==
* Host nation (Thailand)

Rank	Nation	Gold	Silver	Bronze	Total
1	Indonesia	2	1	0	3
2	Vietnam	1	0	1	2
3	Singapore	0	1	1	2
4	Philippines	0	1	0	1
5	Malaysia	0	0	1	1
Totals (5 entries)		3	3	3	9

== Medalists ==
Event	Gold	Silver	Bronze
Men's team relay	Vietnam; Nguyễn Anh Trí; Pao Sung; Phạm Tiến Sản	Indonesia; Rashif Amila Yaqin; Ronald Bintang Setiawan; Alias Praji	Malaysia; Rikigoro Shinozuka; Martyn Lim Wen Xuan; Gavin Sim Wee Hon
Women's team relay	Indonesia; Martina Ayu Pratiwi; Eva Desiana; Zahra Bulan Aprillia Putri	Singapore; Rachel Hew Jia Yi; Ng Xuan Jie; Louisa Marie Middleditch	Vietnam; Nguyễn Thị Thúy Vân; Nguyễn Thị Phương Trinh; Lê Thị Bích
Mixed team relay	Indonesia; Alias Praji; Ronald Bintang Setiawan; Martina Ayu Pratiwi; Azizah Khusnul Qotimah	Philippines; Franklin Ferdie Yee; John Patrick Ciron; Merry Joy Trupa; Erika Nicole Burgos	Singapore; Arif Ibrahim Ahmad; Benjamin Khoo Jun Da; Rachel Hew Jia Yi; Louisa Marie Middleditch
