= Aquathlon at the 2025 SEA Games =

- Venue: Laem Mae Phim Beach, Klaeng
- Location: Rayong, Thailand
- Dates: 16 December 2025
- Competitors: 57 from 7 nations

Aquathlon competitions at the 2025 SEA Games took place at Laem Mae Phim Beach in Klaeng district, Rayong, Thailand at 16 December 2025. Medals were awarded in 3 events.

== Participating nations ==
- Cambodia (5) (withdrew)
- Indonesia (6)
- Malaysia (10)
- Philippines (8)
- Singapore (10)
- Thailand (10) (host)
- Vietnam (8)

== Medal table ==
* Host nation (Thailand)

Rank	Nation	Gold	Silver	Bronze	Total
1	Indonesia	3	0	0	3
2	Philippines	0	2	1	3
3	Singapore	0	1	1	2
4	Malaysia	0	0	1	1
Totals (4 entries)		3	3	3	9

== Medalists ==
Event	Gold	Silver	Bronze
Men's team relay	Indonesia; Muhammad Noval Ashidiq; Muhammad Zidane; Rashif Amila Yaqin	Singapore; Luke Li Rong Chua; Bryce Sheng Cher Chong; Yi Jun Tey	Philippines; Inaki Emil Lorbes; Joshua Alexander Ramos; Andrew Kim Remolino
Women's team relay	Indonesia; Martina Ayu Pratiwi; Kayla Nadia Shafa; Binta Erlen Salsabela	Philippines; Kira Ellis; Erika Nicole Burgos; Kim Mangrobang	Singapore; Wan Ting Lim; Louisa Marie Middleditch; Herlene Natasha Zhihui Yu
Mixed team relay	Indonesia; Muhammad Zidane; Rashif Amila Yaqin; Martina Ayu Pratiwi; Kayla Nadia Shafa	Philippines; Matthew Justine Hermosa; Andrew Kim Remolino; Kira Ellis; Raven Alcoseba	Malaysia; Wen May Ng; Sze Hui Teo; Ee Hann Kan; Nicholas Seh Kit Long
