= Triathlon at the 2025 SEA Games =

- Venue: Laem Mae Phim Beach, Klaeng
- Location: Rayong, Thailand
- Dates: 17–19 December 2025
- Competitors: 48 from 7 nations

Triathlon competitions at the 2025 SEA Games took place at Laem Mae Phim Beach in Klaeng district, Rayong, Thailand at 17–19 December 2025. Medals were awarded in 5 events.

== Participating nations ==
- Cambodia (4) (withdrew)
- Indonesia (7)
- Malaysia (7)
- Philippines (6)
- Singapore (6)
- Thailand (10) (host)
- Vietnam (8)

== Medal table ==
* Host nation (Thailand)

Rank	Nation	Gold	Silver	Bronze	Total
1	Philippines	3	2	1	6
2	Indonesia	2	2	1	5
3	Singapore	0	1	2	3
4	Malaysia	0	0	1	1
Totals (4 entries)		5	5	5	15

== Medalists ==
Event	Gold	Silver	Bronze
Men's individual	Rashif Amila Yaqin; Indonesia	Andrew Kim Remolino; Philippines	Fernando Jose Casares; Philippines
Women's individual	Martina Ayu Pratiwi; Indonesia	Kira Ellis; Philippines	Herlene Natasha Zhihui Yu; Singapore
Men's team relay	Philippines; Inaki Emil Lorbes; Fernando Jose Casares; Matthew Justine Hermosa	Singapore; Luke Li Rong Chua; Bryce Sheng Cher Chong; Yi Jun Tey	Indonesia; Rashif Amila Yaqin; Al Kautsar; Aloysius Reckyardo Mardian
Women's team relay	Philippines; Erika Nicole Burgos; Raven Alcoseba; Kim Mangrobang	Indonesia; Martina Ayu Pratiwi; Eva Desiana; Renata Berliana Aditya	Singapore; Yen Ling Kathlyn Yeo; Louisa Marie Middleditch; Herlene Natasha Zhihui Yu
Mixed team relay	Philippines; Fernando Casares; Raven Alcoseba; Kira Ellis; Andrew Kim Remolino	Indonesia; Martina Ayu Pratiwi; Hauqalah Fakhal Arvyello; Rashif Amila Yaqin; Binta Erlen Salsabela	Malaysia; Isaac Tan Zhen Wei; Yap Qi Yi; Esther Joy Chen Hong Li; Sara Joy Chen Hong Mae
