= Diving at the 2025 SEA Games =

- Venue: Aquatic Center, Assumption University Suvarnabhumi
- Location: Samut Prakan, Thailand
- Dates: 17–19 December

Diving competitions at the 2025 SEA Games took place at the Aquatic Center, Assumption University Suvarnabhumi in Samut Prakan, Thailand from 17 to 19 December 2025.

== Medal table ==
* Host nation (Thailand)

Rank	Nation	Gold	Silver	Bronze	Total
1	Malaysia	2	0	1	3
2	Singapore	1	2	1	4
3	Thailand*	1	2	0	3
4	Indonesia	0	0	1	1
4	Vietnam	0	0	1	1
Totals (5 entries)		4	4	4	12

== Medalists ==
Event	Gold		Silver		Bronze	
Men's 1 m springboard	Avvir Tham Pac Lun; Singapore	370.35	Chawanwat Juntaphadawon; Thailand	357.80	Yong Rui Jie; Malaysia	354.55
Men's 3 m springboard	Chawanwat Juntaphadawon; Thailand	378.30	Avvir Tham Pac Lun; Singapore	376.66	Max Lee Shen Oon; Singapore	366.00
Men's synchronised 3 m springboard	Malaysia; Yong Rui Jie; Nurqayyum Nazmi Mohamad Nazim	359.85	Thailand; Chawanwat Juntaphadawon; Thitipoom Marksin	335.70	Vietnam; Hoang Tu Dang; Anh Tuan Dinh	322.35
Women's synchronised platform	Malaysia; Nurul Farisya Alia Affendi; Nur Eilisha Rania Muhammad Abrar Raj	248.40	Singapore; Ryenne Cham; Ainslee Kwang	237.00	Indonesia; Gladies Lariesa Garina; Linar Betiliana	211.74
