= Squash at the 2025 SEA Games =

- Venue: Squash Court, Vajiravudh College
- Location: Dusit, Bangkok, Thailand
- Dates: 14–19 December 2025

Squash competitions at the 2025 SEA Games took place at Squash Court, Vajiravudh College, in Dusit, Bangkok, Thailand, from 14 to 19 December 2025.

== Medal table ==
* Host nation (Thailand)

Rank	Nation	Gold	Silver	Bronze	Total
1	Malaysia	4	2	0	6
2	Philippines	0	2	2	4
3	Singapore	0	0	4	4
4	Indonesia	0	0	2	2
Totals (4 entries)		4	4	8	16

== Medalists ==
Event	Gold	Silver	Bronze
Men's singles	Sanjay Jeeva; Malaysia	Duncan Lee; Malaysia	Reymark Begornia; Philippines
Men's singles	Sanjay Jeeva; Malaysia	Duncan Lee; Malaysia	Jerome Aw; Singapore
Women's singles	Ainaa Amani; Malaysia	Yee Xin Ying; Malaysia	Jemyca Aribado; Philippines
Women's singles	Ainaa Amani; Malaysia	Yee Xin Ying; Malaysia	Au Yeong Wai Yhann; Singapore
Men's jumbo doubles (U21)	Malaysia; Harith Danial Jefri; Low Wa Sern	Philippines; Christopher Buraga; Jonathan Reyes	Indonesia; Achmad Fauzi; Muhammad Rifaa Ramadhan
Men's jumbo doubles (U21)	Malaysia; Harith Danial Jefri; Low Wa Sern	Philippines; Christopher Buraga; Jonathan Reyes	Singapore; Li Yuan Xin; Samuel Quek Wei Yi
Mixed jumbo doubles (U21)	Malaysia; Sehveetrraa Kumar; Harith Danial Jefri	Philippines; Aerra Jc Mae Relano; Jonathan Reyes	Indonesia; Achmad Fauzi; Raifa Putri Yattaqi
Mixed jumbo doubles (U21)	Malaysia; Sehveetrraa Kumar; Harith Danial Jefri	Philippines; Aerra Jc Mae Relano; Jonathan Reyes	Singapore; Ong Zhe Sim; Ethan Chua Jie Fan
