= Nguyễn Thị Oanh =

Vietnamese athlete

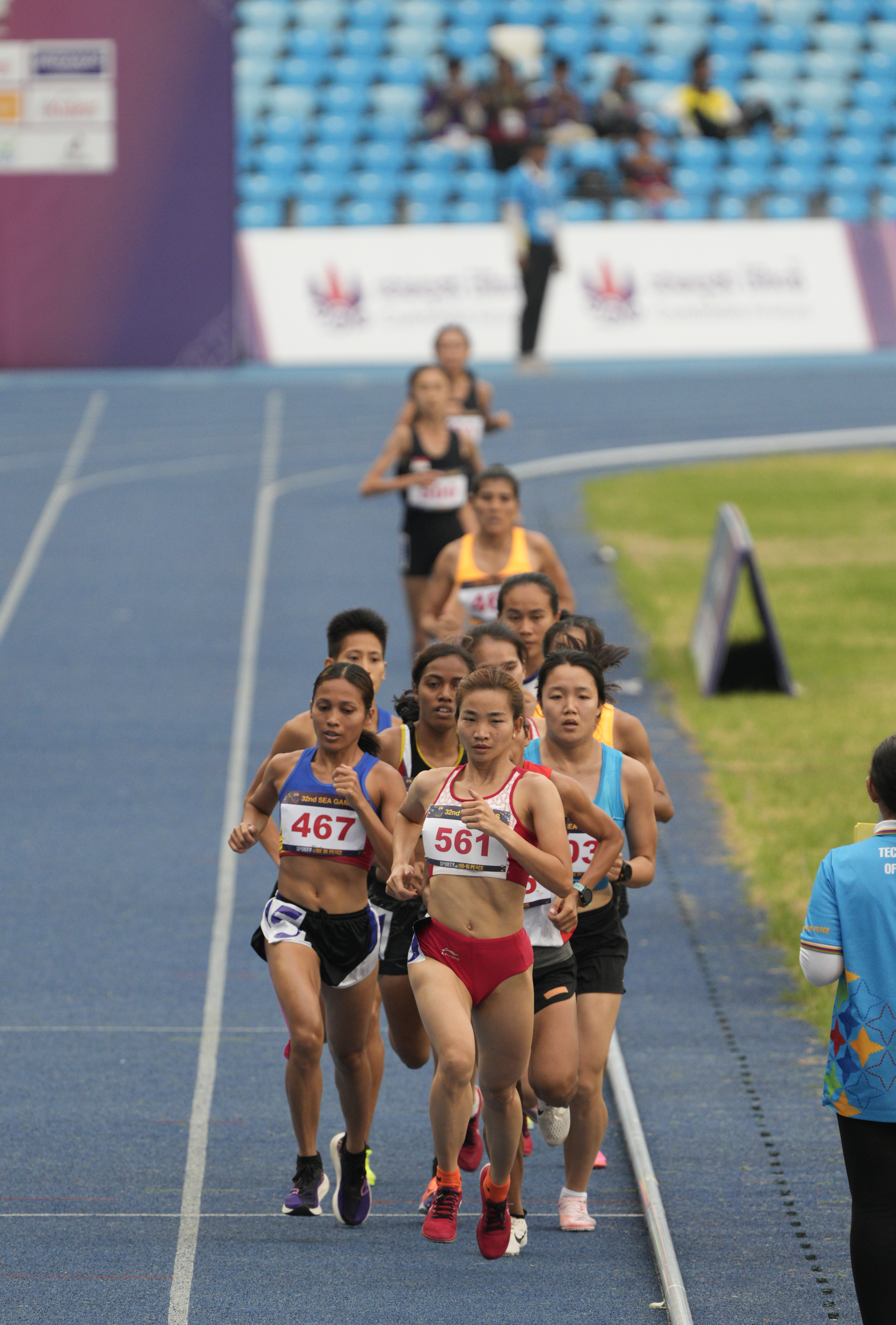
- Nguyễn leading the pack in the 10,000 metres at the 2023 Southeast Asian Games

Personal information
- Born: 15 August 1995 (age 30) Lạng Giang, Bắc Giang, Vietnam

Sport
- Country: Vietnam
- Sport: Athletics
- Event(s): 1500 metres, 3000 metres steeplechase, 5000 metres, 10,000 metres
Medal record
Women's Athletics
Representing Vietnam
Asian Games
Bronze medal – third place	2018 Indonesia	3000 m s'chase
Asian Indoor Championships
Gold medal – first place	2023 Astana	1500 m
Bronze medal – third place	2018 Tehran	1500 m
Bronze medal – third place	2018 Tehran	3000 m
Southeast Asian Games
Gold medal – first place	2017 Malaysia	1500 m
Gold medal – first place	2017 Malaysia	5000 m
Gold medal – first place	2019 Philippines	1500 m
Gold medal – first place	2019 Philippines	3000 m s'chase
Gold medal – first place	2019 Philippines	5000 m
Gold medal – first place	2021 Vietnam	1500 m
Gold medal – first place	2021 Vietnam	3000 m s'chase
Gold medal – first place	2021 Vietnam	5000 m
Gold medal – first place	2023 Cambodia	1500 m
Gold medal – first place	2023 Cambodia	3000 m s'chase
Gold medal – first place	2023 Cambodia	5000 m
Gold medal – first place	2023 Cambodia	10,000 m
Gold medal – first place	2025 Thailand	5000 m
Gold medal – first place	2025 Thailand	10,000 m
Gold medal – first place	2025 Thailand	3000 m s'chase
Silver medal – second place	2013 Myanmar	3000 m s'chase

Nguyễn Thị Oanh is a Vietnamese athlete specialising in middle and long-distance events. She holds various national records, is the SEA Games record holder for the 3000 metres steeplechase, and has won 15 SEA Games gold medals and an Asian Games medal to date.

== Running career ==
At the Southeast Asian level, Nguyễn's first medal was a silver in the 3000 metres steeplechase at the 2013 SEA Games in Myanmar. The following year, she won gold in the same event at the Asian Junior Athletics Championships, but due to illness, she had to take a break from running before resuming at the 2017 SEA Games in Kuala Lumpur. There, she won a pair of gold medals in the 1500 metres and 5000 metres; she repeated this feat at the 2019 SEA Games in the Philippines, and also added a gold in the 3000 metres steeplechase. At the 2021 SEA Games in Hanoi, she defended all three titles, and did so again at the 2023 SEA Games in Phnom Penh, while also adding a gold in the 10,000 metres. Notably, in Phnom Penh, due to a last-minute change in the schedule, the 1500 metres and 3000 metres steeplechase were held just 20 minutes apart. With her wins in the 2023 edition, Nguyễn became the first Vietnamese to win four individual gold medals in a single SEA Games.

At the Asian level, Nguyễn was a bronze medallist in the 3000 metres steeplechase at the 2018 Asian Games and 1500 metres and 3000 metres at the 2018 Asian Indoor Athletics Championships. At the 2023 Asian Indoor Athletics Championships, she won gold in the 1500 metres and came in fifth in the 3000 metres. In the 2023 World Athletics Championships, she was ranked 13th in the 1500 metres.

== Personal bests ==
- 1500 metres – 4:12.28, 19 August 2023
- 1500 metres indoor – 4:15.55, 11 February 2023 (national record)
- 3000 metres steeplechase – 9:43.83, 27 August 2018 (national and SEA Games record)
- 5000 metres – 15:53.48, 10 December 2021 (national record)
- 10,000 metres – 33:13.23, 17 December 2022 (national record)
