= Fencing at the 2025 SEA Games =

- Venue: Island Hall 3rd Floor, Fashion Island
- Location: Bangkok, Thailand
- Dates: 16-19 December 2025

Fencing competitions at the 2025 SEA Games took place at the Island Hall 3rd Floor, Fashion Island in Bangkok, Thailand from 16 to 19 December 2025.

== Medal table ==
* Host nation (Thailand)

Rank	Nation	Gold	Silver	Bronze	Total
1	Singapore	8	3	2	13
2	Vietnam	3	2	5	10
3	Thailand*	1	3	6	10
4	Philippines	0	2	11	13
5	Malaysia	0	2	0	2
Totals (5 entries)		12	12	24	48

== Medalists ==
=== Men ===
Event	Gold	Silver	Bronze
Individual foil	Raphael Tan Juan Kang; Singapore	Notethakod Wangpaisit; Thailand	Nathaniel Perez; Philippines
Individual foil	Raphael Tan Juan Kang; Singapore	Notethakod Wangpaisit; Thailand	Jonathan Lim Tzien Yih; Singapore
Team foil	Singapore; Raphael Tan Juan Kang; Elijah Robson Samuel; Julian Soh Heng Xu; Jonathan Lim Tzien Yih	Malaysia; Kaerlan Vinod Kamalanathan; Heng Yu Shern; Cheng Xing Han; Saif Nordin	Philippines; Shawn Nicollei Felipe; Sammuel Tranquilan; Nathaniel Perez; Louis Marti Shoemaker
Team foil	Singapore; Raphael Tan Juan Kang; Elijah Robson Samuel; Julian Soh Heng Xu; Jonathan Lim Tzien Yih	Malaysia; Kaerlan Vinod Kamalanathan; Heng Yu Shern; Cheng Xing Han; Saif Nordin	Thailand; Chaow-Khun Chansirithorn; Sitsadipat Doungpatra; Ratchanavi Deejing; Notethakod Wangpasit
Individual épée	Nguyễn Phước Đến; Vietnam	Noelito Jose Jr. Philippines	Simon Lee Renjie; Singapore
Individual épée	Nguyễn Phước Đến; Vietnam	Noelito Jose Jr. Philippines	Chinnaphat Chaloemchanen; Thailand
Team épée	Singapore; Simon Lee Renjie; Si To Jian Tong; Bron Sheum Han Shen; Azfar Luqman Ong	Vietnam; Nguyễn Hiểu Minh; Nguyễn Tiến Nhật; Nguyễn Phước Đến; Hoàng Nhật Nam	Philippines; Sammuel Tranquilan; Noelito Jose Jr. Jian Miguel Bautista; Lee Eigran Ergina
Team épée	Singapore; Simon Lee Renjie; Si To Jian Tong; Bron Sheum Han Shen; Azfar Luqman Ong	Vietnam; Nguyễn Hiểu Minh; Nguyễn Tiến Nhật; Nguyễn Phước Đến; Hoàng Nhật Nam	Thailand; Chinnaphat Chaloemchanen; Jadsadaporn Puengkuntod; Nattiphong Singkham; Tanadon Klinnimnual
Individual sabre	Nguyễn Xuân Lợi; Vietnam	Nguyễn Văn Quyết; Vietnam	Christian Jhester Concepcion; Philippines
Individual sabre	Nguyễn Xuân Lợi; Vietnam	Nguyễn Văn Quyết; Vietnam	Eunice Daniel Villanueva; Philippines
Team sabre	Vietnam; Nguyễn Xuân Lợi; Nguyễn Văn Quyết; Phan Ánh Dương; Lê Văn Bang	Malaysia; Terry Lee Dong Wei; Sebastian Lim Jia Sheng; Wong Tzer Chyuan; Syed Adam Emir Aidi Putra	Philippines; Khiane Nash Felipe; Christian Anthony Concepcion; Christian Jhester Concepcion; Eunice Daniel Villanueva
Team sabre	Vietnam; Nguyễn Xuân Lợi; Nguyễn Văn Quyết; Phan Ánh Dương; Lê Văn Bang	Malaysia; Terry Lee Dong Wei; Sebastian Lim Jia Sheng; Wong Tzer Chyuan; Syed Adam Emir Aidi Putra	Thailand; Pakarn Pongdee; Phongphipat Ngam-nuch; Voragun Srinualnad; Panachai Wiriyatangsakul

=== Women ===
Event	Gold	Silver	Bronze
Individual foil	Amita Berthier; Singapore	Maxine Wong Jie Xin; Singapore	Samantha Catantan; Philippines
Individual foil	Amita Berthier; Singapore	Maxine Wong Jie Xin; Singapore	Janna Allysah Catantan; Philippines
Team foil	Singapore; Amita Berthier; Maxine Wong Jie Xin; Cheung Kemei; Stephanie Lee Tingyi	Philippines; Janna Allysah Catantan; Gabrielle Grace Gebala; Samantha Catantan; Sophia Shekainah Catantan	Vietnam; Hà Thị Vân Anh; Lê Thị Nhung; Nguyễn Thị Thu Phương; Trần Hồng Anh
Team foil	Singapore; Amita Berthier; Maxine Wong Jie Xin; Cheung Kemei; Stephanie Lee Tingyi	Philippines; Janna Allysah Catantan; Gabrielle Grace Gebala; Samantha Catantan; Sophia Shekainah Catantan	Thailand; Suchanart Rungruang; Naramol Longthong; Chayada Smithisukul; Chayanutphat Shinnakerdchoke
Individual épée	Elle Koh Meihui; Singapore	Kiria Tikanah; Singapore	Nguyễn Phương Kim; Vietnam
Individual épée	Elle Koh Meihui; Singapore	Kiria Tikanah; Singapore	Natpapat Sangngio; Thailand
Team épée	Singapore; Esther Tan; Kiria Tikanah; Filzah Hidayah Nor Anuar; Elle Koh Meihui	Thailand; Mooktapa Thiankul; Korawan Thanee; Warisa Winya; Natpapat Sangngio	Vietnam; Nguyễn Thị Kiều Oanh; Vũ Thị Hồng; Nguyễn Phương Kim; Đỗ Thị Hà Giang
Team épée	Singapore; Esther Tan; Kiria Tikanah; Filzah Hidayah Nor Anuar; Elle Koh Meihui	Thailand; Mooktapa Thiankul; Korawan Thanee; Warisa Winya; Natpapat Sangngio	Philippines; Juliana Gomez; Ivy Claire Dinoy; Hanniel Abella; Alexa Larrazabal
Individual sabre	Juliet Heng Jie Min; Singapore	Tonkhaw Phokaew; Thailand	Phạm Thị Thu Hoài; Vietnam
Individual sabre	Juliet Heng Jie Min; Singapore	Tonkhaw Phokaew; Thailand	Charmaine Grace Andres; Philippines
Team sabre	Thailand; Tonkhaw Phokaew; Poonyanuch Pitthakduangkamol; Arisara Somphao; Bandhita Srinualnad	Singapore; Juliet Heng Jie Min; Christine Tan Kai Li; Jermaine Tan Ruo Ting; Jae Lim Jia En	Vietnam; Ngô Thị Hương; Phạm Thị Thu Hoài; Lê Minh Hằng; Phùng Thị Khánh Linh
Team sabre	Thailand; Tonkhaw Phokaew; Poonyanuch Pitthakduangkamol; Arisara Somphao; Bandhita Srinualnad	Singapore; Juliet Heng Jie Min; Christine Tan Kai Li; Jermaine Tan Ruo Ting; Jae Lim Jia En	Philippines; Queen Denise Dalmacio; Charmaine Grace Andres; Jylyn Nicanor; Kaikaku Dela Serna
