= Indoor hockey at the 2025 SEA Games =

- Venue: Thai-Japan Sports Center Bangkok
- Location: Bangkok, Thailand
- Dates: 13–19 December 2025
- Nations: 5

Champions
- Men: Indonesia
- Women: Thailand

Indoor hockey competitions at the 2025 SEA Games took place at Thai-Japan Sports Center Bangkok in Bangkok, Thailand from 13 to 19 December 2025. Medals were awarded in 2 events, which are men and women tournament.

== Participating nations ==
- Indonesia
- Malaysia
- Philippines
- Singapore
- Thailand (host)

== Medal table ==
* Host nation (Thailand)

Rank	Nation	Gold	Silver	Bronze	Total
1	Indonesia	1	0	1	2
1	Thailand*	1	0	1	2
3	Malaysia	0	2	0	2
4	Singapore	0	0	2	2
Totals (4 entries)		2	2	4	8

== Medalists ==
Event	Gold	Silver	Bronze
Men's tournament	Indonesia; Adi Darmawan Leksono; Alam Fajar Kusuma; Alvin Febrian Rezqia; Andrea Guntara Adi Very Sandrea; Candra Juli Prawesti; Fajar Jaelani Nugraha; Ferdian Fathur Rahman; Muhamad Alfiana; Muhammad Hendri Firdaus; Prima Rinaldi Santoso; Revo Priliandro; Yuan Jodie Hibatullah	Malaysia; Abdul Khaliq Hamirin; Faridzul Afiq Mohd; Meor Muhamad Azuan Hasan; Mohamad Ashran Hamsani; Mohamad Hazrul Faiz Sobri; Muhamad Izham Azhar; Muhammad Aslam Hanafiah; Muhammad Firdaus Omar; Muhammad Hamiz Ahir; Muhammad Najmi Farizal Jazlan; Shahmie Irfan Suhaimi; Shazril Irwan Nazli	Thailand; Warawut A-nukoon; Jarernchai Noonee; Peerapat Patthanapornthiti; Noppadon Phaosang; Nobphon Piriram; Jirawat Samoang; Kittithat Sori; Pongpon Sukwong; Songkan Sumhiran; Anuson Suyaram; Sarawut Wangchua; Piyasak Yuphet
Men's tournament	Indonesia; Adi Darmawan Leksono; Alam Fajar Kusuma; Alvin Febrian Rezqia; Andrea Guntara Adi Very Sandrea; Candra Juli Prawesti; Fajar Jaelani Nugraha; Ferdian Fathur Rahman; Muhamad Alfiana; Muhammad Hendri Firdaus; Prima Rinaldi Santoso; Revo Priliandro; Yuan Jodie Hibatullah	Malaysia; Abdul Khaliq Hamirin; Faridzul Afiq Mohd; Meor Muhamad Azuan Hasan; Mohamad Ashran Hamsani; Mohamad Hazrul Faiz Sobri; Muhamad Izham Azhar; Muhammad Aslam Hanafiah; Muhammad Firdaus Omar; Muhammad Hamiz Ahir; Muhammad Najmi Farizal Jazlan; Shahmie Irfan Suhaimi; Shazril Irwan Nazli	Singapore; Guhan Mayazhagu; Muhammad Hidayat Mat Rahim; Muhammad Syariful Haq Sapari; Gerald Wong Jing Yang; Mohd Jumaeen Amat Kamsin; Ct Karuppiah Arasu; Jeriel Kwok Kum-Liang; Aik Yu Chen; Dillon Lee Hern; Kaosigan K Yoganathan; Ct Mani Lakshmanan; Ishwarpal Singh Grewal
Women's tournament	Thailand	Malaysia	Indonesia
Women's tournament	Thailand	Malaysia	Singapore
