= Artistic swimming at the 2025 SEA Games =

- Venue: Aquatic Center, Assumption University Suvarnabhumi
- Location: Samut Prakan, Thailand
- Dates: 10–13 December
- Competitors: 45 from 4 nations

Artistic swimming competitions at the 2025 SEA Games took place at the Aquatic Center, Assumption University Suvarnabhumi in Samut Prakan, Thailand from 10 to 13 December 2025. This marks the return of the sport after an 8-year hiatus.

== Participating nations ==
- Indonesia (10)
- Malaysia (12)
- Singapore (9)
- Thailand (14)

== Medal table ==
* Host nation (Thailand)

| Rank | Nation | Gold | Silver | Bronze | Total |
|---|---|---|---|---|---|
| 1 | Thailand* | 2 | 1 | 1 | 4 |
| 2 | Singapore | 1 | 1 | 0 | 2 |
| 3 | Malaysia | 0 | 1 | 0 | 1 |
| 4 | Indonesia | 0 | 0 | 2 | 2 |
| Totals (4 entries) | | 3 | 3 | 3 | 9 |

== Medalists ==
| Event | Gold | | Silver | | Bronze | |
|---|---|---|---|---|---|---|
| Women's duet | Singapore; Debbie Soh; Yvette Chong Ann | 474.5046 | Thailand; Patrewee Chayawararak; Voranan Toomchay; Chantaras Jarupraditlert | 381.8808 | Indonesia; Hilda Tri Julyandra; Talitha Amabelle Putri Subeni | 358.8963 |
| Mixed duet | Thailand; Kantinan Adisaisiributr; Supitchaya Songpan; Pongpimporn Pongsuwan | 447.3455 | Malaysia; Hao Zheng Wu; Khai Yee Tang | 324.7920 | Thailand; Wattikorn Khethirankanok; Chantarat Jarupraditlert; Nichapa Takiennut | 309.1234 |
| Women's team | Thailand; Jinnipha Adisaisiributr; Patrawee Chayawararak; Nannapat Duangprasert; Kanyanatt Kaewvisit; Pongpimporn Pongsuwan; Getsarin Sawangarom; Supitchaya Songpan; Voranan Toomchay | 235.6296 | Singapore; Caitlyn Tan; Claire Tan; Kiera Lee; Rachel Ho; Rae-Anne Ong; Debbie Soh; Rhea Thean; Thean Rachel; Yvette Chong Ann | 222.3074 | Indonesia; Rani Asriani Rahman; Rasya Annisa Rahman; Nawrah Qanitah Zhafirah; Auliya Mustika Putri; Khansa Fathiyyah Zahrani Saman; Mutiara Nur Azisah; Nurfa Nurul Utami; Amandha Mutiara Putri | 156.0892 |
