= Yee Xin Ying =

Malaysian squash player (born 2003)

Personal information
- Born: November 12, 2003 (age 22) Sandakan, Malaysia

Sport
- Country: Malaysian
- Handedness: left-handed
- Retired: Active
- Racquet used: 2019
- Highest ranking: No. 65 (April 2025)
- Current ranking: No. 65 (April 2025)
Medal record
Women's squash
Representing Malaysia
World Team Championships
| Bronze medal – third place | 2022 Cairo | Team |
SEA Games
| Silver medal – second place | 2025 Thailand | Singles |

Yee Xin Ying (born 12 November 2003), also known as Yee Ying, is a Malaysian professional squash player. She achieved her career-high ranking of World No. 65 in April 2025.

== Career ==
In 2022, she was part of the Malaysian team that won a bronze at the 2022 Women's World Team Squash Championships.

In October 2024, Ying won her 5th PSA title after securing victory in the Open de Lagord during the 2024–25 PSA Squash Tour. This was soon followed by a 6th title after winning the RC Pro Series.
