= Kabaddi at the 2025 SEA Games =

- Venue: Chalermphrakiat Sports Centre, Rajamangala University of Technology Thanyaburi, Thanyaburi
- Location: Pathum Thani, Thailand
- Dates: 11–18 December 2025

Kabaddi competitions at the 2025 SEA Games took place at Chalermphrakiat Sports Centre, Rajamangala University of Technology Thanyaburi in Thanyaburi, Pathum Thani, from 11 to 18 December 2025.

This edition marks the debut of the sport in the ASEAN Games.

== Medal table ==
* Host nation (Thailand)

Rank	Nation	Gold	Silver	Bronze	Total
1	Thailand*	4	1	1	6
2	Indonesia	1	4	1	6
3	Malaysia	1	1	4	6
4	Singapore	0	0	6	6
Totals (4 entries)		6	6	12	24

== Medalists ==
=== Men ===
Event	Gold	Silver	Bronze
Standard Style	Thailand; Theeradet Chaisit; Roengrom Chaturonphaisan; Chayaphon Kamunee; Ratchanon Nacksavad; Chakrit Nuchakaew; Saharat Phetchui; Nithiphat Phikhrao; Pootawun Phoorahong; Nopphadon Pontaisong; Pramot Saising; Supawit Somrat; Tanongsak Srihera; Hasun Thongkruea; Wisat Wuttari; Rattanakon Yotsungnoen	Indonesia; David Rinekso Pribadi; Ervin; Gd Yoga Pratama Artha Bhaskara; I Gede Jaya Guna; I Gusti Agung Eka Wibawa Dana; I Komang Wahyu Brahmasta; I Made Dwiki Sanjaya; I Made Suastika; I Made Widi Januarta; I Putu Darma Indrawan; I Putu Ngurah Krisna Adipranata; Muhammad Iriansyah	Singapore; Anbu Navin N Annadurai; Brian Darrell Reyes; Kannan Gokul; Kannan Shainikilesh; Karunakaran Kishore; M Aidil Asyraaf bin Abd Mutalib; Mohamed Azad Fuad; Muthukumaran Rajakumar; Parthiv Murugesh; Raja Sri Raam; Rayan Zuhayr bin Nurul Hatta; S Rahoul Dev Shiv Ram; Vishnuvarthan Vishva Deva; Yathukulan Ahdhitthyan
Standard Style	Thailand; Theeradet Chaisit; Roengrom Chaturonphaisan; Chayaphon Kamunee; Ratchanon Nacksavad; Chakrit Nuchakaew; Saharat Phetchui; Nithiphat Phikhrao; Pootawun Phoorahong; Nopphadon Pontaisong; Pramot Saising; Supawit Somrat; Tanongsak Srihera; Hasun Thongkruea; Wisat Wuttari; Rattanakon Yotsungnoen	Indonesia; David Rinekso Pribadi; Ervin; Gd Yoga Pratama Artha Bhaskara; I Gede Jaya Guna; I Gusti Agung Eka Wibawa Dana; I Komang Wahyu Brahmasta; I Made Dwiki Sanjaya; I Made Suastika; I Made Widi Januarta; I Putu Darma Indrawan; I Putu Ngurah Krisna Adipranata; Muhammad Iriansyah	Malaysia; Devinthirakumaar Vijayan Kumaran; Dhaanushruban Raveechandran; Gajenthiran Ganesan; Kugan Letchumanan; Madhava Rao Rama Naidu; Megarajaan Maran; Nantha Kanesan; Navinessh Ragunathen; Prithiswaran Kaliyappan; Saikabenesh Sai Baba; Sarmah Vishnu Selva Ganapathy; Suresh Kim Seng Leong; Tharveen Mahesan; Thinesh Raaj Gopalan; Viknesshwaran Gunaseelan
Super Five	Thailand; Chayaphon Kamunee; Saharat Phetchui; Nithiphat Phikhrao; Nopphadon Pontaisong; Pramot Saising; Supawit Somrat; Tanongsak Srihera; Hasun Thongkruea; Rattanakon Yotsungnoen	Indonesia; David Rinekso Pribadi; I Gede Jaya Guna; I Gusti Agung Eka Wibawa Dana; I Made Dwiki Sanjaya; I Made Suastika; I Putu Darma Indrawan; Muhammad Iriansyah	Singapore; Anbu Navin N Annadurai; Kannan Gokul; Kannan Shainikilesh; Muthukumaran Rajakumar; Parthiv Murugesh; Rayan Zuhayr bin Nurul Hatta; S Rahoul Dev Shiv Ram; Yathukulan Ahdhitthyan
Super Five	Thailand; Chayaphon Kamunee; Saharat Phetchui; Nithiphat Phikhrao; Nopphadon Pontaisong; Pramot Saising; Supawit Somrat; Tanongsak Srihera; Hasun Thongkruea; Rattanakon Yotsungnoen	Indonesia; David Rinekso Pribadi; I Gede Jaya Guna; I Gusti Agung Eka Wibawa Dana; I Made Dwiki Sanjaya; I Made Suastika; I Putu Darma Indrawan; Muhammad Iriansyah	Malaysia; Devinthirakumaar Vijayan Kumaran; Gajenthiran Ganesan; Kugan Letchumanan; Madhava Rao Rama Naidu; Megarajaan Maran; Navinessh Ragunathen; Saikabenesh Sai Baba; Sarmah Vishnu Selva Ganapathy; Thinesh Raaj Gopalan
Three Stars	Indonesia; Ervin; Gd Yoga Pratama Artha Bhaskara; I Komang Wahyu Brahmasta; I Made Widi Januarta; I Putu Ngurah Krisna Adipranata	Malaysia; Dhaanushruban Raveechandran; Nantha Kanesan; Prithiswaran Kaliyappan; Suresh Kim Seng Leong; Tharveen Mahesan; Viknesshwaran Gunaseelan	Singapore; Brian Darrell Reyes; Karunakaran Kishore; M Aidil Asyraaf bin Abd Mutalib; Mohamed Azad Fuad; Raja Sri Raam; Vishnuvarthan Vishva Deva
Three Stars	Indonesia; Ervin; Gd Yoga Pratama Artha Bhaskara; I Komang Wahyu Brahmasta; I Made Widi Januarta; I Putu Ngurah Krisna Adipranata	Malaysia; Dhaanushruban Raveechandran; Nantha Kanesan; Prithiswaran Kaliyappan; Suresh Kim Seng Leong; Tharveen Mahesan; Viknesshwaran Gunaseelan	Thailand; Theeradet Chaisit; Roengrom Chaturonphaisan; Ratchanon Nacksavad; Chakrit Nuchakaew; Pootawun Phoorahong; Wisat Wuttari

=== Women ===
Event	Gold	Silver	Bronze
Standard Style	Thailand; Kotchakorn Chaimajak; Sirada Chanchaemsri; Diana Deesalarm; Pawarisa Eaddam; Papaporn Jaiyod; Bencharat Khwanchai; Treepet Kliadsoo; Wanita Ma Yer; Thitima Mool-nam-ang; Wiyada Putthong; Wassana Rachmanee; Chayanit Satit; Darin Sukchuai; Wanatsanan Tipkonglas; Kamontip Tippichaikul	Indonesia; Dewa Ayu Sri Wahyuni; Made Dhyani Pramestya Dewi; Ni Kadek Ari Wartini; Ni Komang Pebriyanti; Ni Komang Tri Meiyoni; Ni Komang Trisna Arkasari; Ni Luh Happy Restia Dewi; Ni Made Dwiyani Putri; Ni Putu Alya Virda Yanti; Ni Putu Nadine Aristya Dewi; Oktavia Riska Della; Yuni Amirta Nadila	Malaysia; Amutha Nithyanandam; Ananthi Muniandy; Bramakumari Mani; Darsini Jagjit Singh; Dharshini Ravee; Lynessa Mary William Franklin; Mavithra Ramakrishnan; Nanthini Krishnan; Nurfalah Zulhijjah Norolashikin; Shakthi Shre Visvalingam; Sivashangkari Hariselvam; Thevatharshini Poobalan; Uchira Nambiar Prem Kumar
Standard Style	Thailand; Kotchakorn Chaimajak; Sirada Chanchaemsri; Diana Deesalarm; Pawarisa Eaddam; Papaporn Jaiyod; Bencharat Khwanchai; Treepet Kliadsoo; Wanita Ma Yer; Thitima Mool-nam-ang; Wiyada Putthong; Wassana Rachmanee; Chayanit Satit; Darin Sukchuai; Wanatsanan Tipkonglas; Kamontip Tippichaikul	Indonesia; Dewa Ayu Sri Wahyuni; Made Dhyani Pramestya Dewi; Ni Kadek Ari Wartini; Ni Komang Pebriyanti; Ni Komang Tri Meiyoni; Ni Komang Trisna Arkasari; Ni Luh Happy Restia Dewi; Ni Made Dwiyani Putri; Ni Putu Alya Virda Yanti; Ni Putu Nadine Aristya Dewi; Oktavia Riska Della; Yuni Amirta Nadila	Singapore; A Priyadarshini; Anandarajan Sadhana; Anandarajan Sindini; Arthi Selvan; Ayyakkannu Abiraami; K. Suba Lakshmi Kathiravan; M Vishwalah Devi; Putri Siti Nur Farhani bte Shamsuri; Raghuram Mithra; Rethinasabapathi Indhusri Kousika; Samyuktha Pugalanthi; Sasmithaa; Thanushri Ramakrishnan; Trisha Raja; Umapathy Sankar Praveenaa
Super Five	Thailand; Sirada Chanchaemsri; Diana Deesalarm; Pawarisa Eaddam; Bencharat Khwanchai; Thitima Mool-nam-ang; Wiyada Putthong; Wassana Rachmanee; Wanatsanan Tipkonglas; Kamontip Tippichaikul	Indonesia; Dewa Ayu Sri Wahyuni; Made Dhyani Pramestya Dewi; Ni Komang Pebriyanti; Ni Komang Trisna Arkasari; Ni Made Dwiyani Putri; Ni Putu Alya Virda Yanti; Ni Putu Nadine Aristya Dewi	Singapore; A Priyadarshini; Anandarajan Sadhana; Arthi Selvan; Ayyakkannu Abiraami; M Vishwalah Devi; Putri Siti Nur Farhani bte Shamsuri; Sasmithaa; Thanushri Ramakrishnan; Trisha Raja
Super Five	Thailand; Sirada Chanchaemsri; Diana Deesalarm; Pawarisa Eaddam; Bencharat Khwanchai; Thitima Mool-nam-ang; Wiyada Putthong; Wassana Rachmanee; Wanatsanan Tipkonglas; Kamontip Tippichaikul	Indonesia; Dewa Ayu Sri Wahyuni; Made Dhyani Pramestya Dewi; Ni Komang Pebriyanti; Ni Komang Trisna Arkasari; Ni Made Dwiyani Putri; Ni Putu Alya Virda Yanti; Ni Putu Nadine Aristya Dewi	Malaysia; Amutha Nithyanandam; Bramakumari Mani; Dharshini Ravee; Lynessa Mary William Franklin; Nurfalah Zulhijjah Norolashikin; Shakthi Shre Visvalingam; Thevatharshini Poobalan
Three Stars	Malaysia; Ananthi Muniandy; Darsini Jagjit Singh; Mavithra Ramakrishnan; Nanthini Krishnan; Sivashangkari Hariselvam; Uchira Nambiar Prem Kumar	Thailand; Kotchakorn Chaimajak; Papaporn Jaiyod; Treepet Kliadsoo; Wanita Ma Yer; Chayanit Satit; Darin Sukchuai	Indonesia; Ni Kadek Ari Wartini; Ni Komang Tri Meiyoni; Ni Luh Happy Restia Dewi; Oktavia Riska Della; Yuni Amirta Nadila
Three Stars	Malaysia; Ananthi Muniandy; Darsini Jagjit Singh; Mavithra Ramakrishnan; Nanthini Krishnan; Sivashangkari Hariselvam; Uchira Nambiar Prem Kumar	Thailand; Kotchakorn Chaimajak; Papaporn Jaiyod; Treepet Kliadsoo; Wanita Ma Yer; Chayanit Satit; Darin Sukchuai	Singapore; Anandarajan Sindini; K. Suba Lakshmi Kathiravan; Raghuram Mithra; Rethinasabapathi Indhusri Kousika; Samyuktha Pugalanthi; Umapathy Sankar Praveenaa
