= Sailing at the 2025 SEA Games =

- Venue: Jomtien Beach and Samudara Kila Yachting Center
- Location: Bang Lamung and Sattahip, Chonburi, Thailand
- Dates: 10-18 December

Sailing competitions at the 2025 SEA Games took place at Jomtien Beach in Bang Lamung and Samudara Kila Yachting Center in Sattahip, Chonburi, Thailand from 10 to 18 December 2025.

== Medal table ==
* Host nation (Thailand)

Rank	Nation	Gold	Silver	Bronze	Total
1	Thailand*	8	3	2	13
2	Singapore	4	4	2	10
3	Philippines	1	1	4	6
4	Malaysia	0	5	3	8
5	Myanmar	0	0	2	2
Totals (5 entries)		13	13	13	39

== Medalists ==
=== Kiteboarding ===
Event	Gold	Silver	Bronze
Men's Formula Kite	Maximilian Maeder; Singapore	Joseph Jonathan Weston; Thailand	Warner Janoya; Philippines

=== Sailing ===
Event	Gold	Silver	Bronze
Men's ILCA7	Ryan Lo; Singapore	Khairulnizam Afendy; Malaysia	Bowonnan Chanram; Thailand
Boys' ILCA4	Darwin Hsu; Thailand	Austin Yeo Jia Yu; Singapore	Khun Tun Oo; Myanmar
Boys' Optimist	Ethan Chia Han Wei; Singapore	Adison Ein; Thailand	Muhammad Yaasin Syahrizan; Malaysia
Women's ILCA6	Jania Ang; Singapore	Nur Shazrin Mohd Latif; Malaysia	Noppassorn Khunboonjan; Thailand
Girls' ILCA4	Prin Subying; Thailand	Nur Zafrina Syuhada Zailan; Malaysia	Nia Mehry Zahedi; Singapore
Girls' Optimist	Pailin Jaroenpon; Thailand	Anya Alessia Zahedi; Singapore	Lydia Hannah Jasmine Lukman; Malaysia
470	Thailand; Navee Thamsoontorn; Nichapa Waiwai	Malaysia; Juni Karimah Noor Jamali; Muhammad Fauzi Kaman Shah	Philippines; Edgar Villapaña; Jonalyn Parocha
Keelboat SSL47	Thailand; Alexander Amarit Frefel; Navee Thamsoontorn; Chusitt Punjamala; Don Whitcraft; Sanont Khaisaeng; Dylan Whitcraft; Kevin Robert Whitcraft; Anusorn Ngamrit; Nut Butmarasri; Noppakao Poonpat; Nichapa Waiwai; Suthida	Malaysia; Ahmad Hakhimi Ahmad Shukri; Asmawi Azman; Asri Asman; Abdul Latif Mansor; Ahmad Faizul Aswad Mohamed; Nur Amirah Hamid; Muhd Uzair Amin Mohd Yusof; Ahmad Syukri Abdul Aziz; Mohd Akiyuddin Mat Zaki; Juni Karimah Noor Jamali; Khairunnisa Afendy; Khairulnizam Afendy	Myanmar; Thi Htoo Saw Thaw; Oo Thant Zaw; Lynn Khin Nyo; Soe Su Myat; Myint Sithu Moe; Hein Sai Pyae Sone; Min Min; Thu Aung Myin; Say Nan Khan; Thura Zwee; Kaung Min Thaw; Hein Si Thu

=== Windsurfer ===
Event	Gold	Silver	Bronze
Men's IQFoil	Nittiphat Chaiwuttiwet; Thailand	Elkan Reshawn Oh; Singapore	John Madrigal; Philippines
Boy's iQFoil (U19)	Dhenver Castillo; Philippines	Passapong Lianglam; Thailand	John Wong Tze Xiang; Singapore
Men's Techno293 Plus	Navin Singsart; Thailand	Renz Angelo Amboy; Philippines	Muhammad Izzuddin Abdul Rani; Malaysia
Women's IQFoil	Aticha Homraruen; Thailand	Angel Chew; Singapore	Arrianne Paz; Philippines
