= Open water swimming at the 2025 SEA Games =

- Venue: Jomtien Beach; Samae Beach, Ko Lan
- Location: Chonburi, Thailand
- Dates: 18-20 December 2025
- Competitors: 29 from 6 nations

Open water swimming competitions at the 2025 SEA Games took place at Jomtien Beach and Samae Beach in Chonburi, Thailand from 18 to 20 December 2025. Medals were awarded in 3 events.

== Participating nations ==
- Indonesia (4)
- Malaysia (4)
- Philippines (4)
- Singapore (7)
- Thailand (5) (host)
- Vietnam (5)

== Medal table ==
* Host nation (Thailand)

Rank	Nation	Gold	Silver	Bronze	Total
1	Thailand*	2	0	1	3
2	Vietnam	1	1	1	3
3	Singapore	0	2	1	3
Totals (3 entries)		3	3	3	9

== Medalists ==
Event	Gold		Silver		Bronze	
Men's 10 km	Ratthawit Thammananthacothe; Thailand	1:56:37	Mai Trần Tuấn Anh; Vietnam	1:56:38	Artyom Lukasevits; Singapore	1:56:41
Women's 10 km	Kamonchanok Kwanmuang; Thailand	2:06:30	Chantal Liew; Singapore	2:06:35	Võ Thị Mỹ Tiên; Vietnam	2:11:17
Mixed relay	Vietnam; Nguyễn Khả Nhi; Võ Thị Mỹ Tiên; Nguyễn Huy Hoàng; Mai Trần Tuấn Anh	1:12:18	Singapore; Kate Ona; Russel Pang; Timothy Cheah Jing Fu; Gan Ching Hwee	1:12:53	Thailand; Kittinun Chothistayanggoon; Kamonchanok Kwanmuang; Thitirat Charoensup; Ratthawit Thammananthacothe	1:14:27
