= Field hockey at the 2025 SEA Games =

- Venue: Hockey field, Thailand National Sports University
- Location: Chonburi, Thailand
- Dates: 11–19 December 2025
- Nations: 6

Champions
- Men: Malaysia
- Women: Malaysia

Field hockey competitions at the 2025 SEA Games took place at Thailand National Sports University in Chonburi, Thailand from 11 to 19 December 2025. Medals were awarded in 6 2 events, which are men and women tournament.

== Participating nations ==
- Indonesia
- Malaysia
- Myanmar
- Singapore
- Thailand (host)

== Medal table ==
* Host nation (Thailand)

Rank	Nation	Gold	Silver	Bronze	Total
1	Malaysia	2	0	0	2
2	Indonesia	0	1	1	2
2	Thailand*	0	1	1	2
4	Singapore	0	0	2	2
Totals (4 entries)		2	2	4	8

== Medalists ==
Event	Gold	Silver	Bronze
Men's tournament	Malaysia; Muhammad Shafiq Hassan; Muhammad Hafizuddin Othman; Amanraj Singh; Muhammad Azrai Aizad Abu Kamal; Mohd Fitri Saari; Muhammad Marhan Jalil; Mughni Mohamad Kamal; Muhammad Najib Abu Hassan; Muhammad Amirul Hamizan Azahar; Alfarico Lance Liau Jr. Muhamad Faris Harizan; Faiz Helmi Jali; Muhajir Abdu Rauf; Shello Silverius; Mohamad Rafaizul Saini; Nik Muhammad Aiman Nik Rozemi; Syed Mohamad Syafiq Syed Cholan; Norsyafiq Sumantri	Thailand; Thanakrit Boon-art; Kankawee Boonsri; Pichet Chaimanee; Kritsada Chueamkaew; Narentorn Deesa; Borirak Harapan; Tanakit Juntakian; Suriya Kasonbua; Warakorn Kiram; Udomchok Phokphun; Thawin Phomjunt; Wistawas Phosawang; Chanachol Rungniyom; Jiranat Sae-aew; Theerachai Sansamran; Wirawat Singthong; Kraiwich Thawichat; Nattapong Trisom	Indonesia; Abdullah Jihad Al Akbar; Achmad Fachrizal; Ahdan Asasi Ramadhan Uno; Ahmad Fikri Nur Hikmat; Akmal Khaerulloh; Alfandy Aly Surya Prastyo; Ardam; Arthur Blasius Wibowo; Asrul Alam; Aulia Akbar Al Ardh; Derangga Raditya; Fadli Muhamad; Jerry Efendi; Julian Agung Mahendra; Julius Rizhad Rumaropen; Mochamad Fathur Rochman; Nurul Maulana Yusuf; Redy Dwi Lingga
Men's tournament	Malaysia; Muhammad Shafiq Hassan; Muhammad Hafizuddin Othman; Amanraj Singh; Muhammad Azrai Aizad Abu Kamal; Mohd Fitri Saari; Muhammad Marhan Jalil; Mughni Mohamad Kamal; Muhammad Najib Abu Hassan; Muhammad Amirul Hamizan Azahar; Alfarico Lance Liau Jr. Muhamad Faris Harizan; Faiz Helmi Jali; Muhajir Abdu Rauf; Shello Silverius; Mohamad Rafaizul Saini; Nik Muhammad Aiman Nik Rozemi; Syed Mohamad Syafiq Syed Cholan; Norsyafiq Sumantri	Thailand; Thanakrit Boon-art; Kankawee Boonsri; Pichet Chaimanee; Kritsada Chueamkaew; Narentorn Deesa; Borirak Harapan; Tanakit Juntakian; Suriya Kasonbua; Warakorn Kiram; Udomchok Phokphun; Thawin Phomjunt; Wistawas Phosawang; Chanachol Rungniyom; Jiranat Sae-aew; Theerachai Sansamran; Wirawat Singthong; Kraiwich Thawichat; Nattapong Trisom	Singapore; Dineshraj Naidu; Muhamad Raziq Mohd Noor; Darius Yap Wee Lee; Kent Loo Tian Poh; Ramanan Thulasiram; Nufail Raiyan Abu Bakar; Silas Abdul Razak Noor Shah; Muhammad Bazil Kahar; Muhammad Zaki Zulkarnain; Ashwin Unnithan; Jaspal Singh Grewal; Hariraj Naidu; Muhammad Fariz Mohd Basir; Joshua Teh Yu Hang; Abqari Sirhan Mohamad Muliyadi; Darren Sia Dian Lun; Jharen Glen Victoriano Yap; Naveen Kumar
Women's tournament	Malaysia; Anith Humaira Baharudin; Dayang Nuramirah Abang Mahadini; Fatin Shafika Mahd Sukri; Hanis Nadiah Onn; Juliani Mohamad Din; Khairunnisa Ayuni Mohd Sharuddin; Noor Hasliza Md Ali; Nur Afiqah Syahzani Azhar; Nur Hazlinda Zainal Abidin; Nur Insyirah Effarizal; Nur Nabila Alia Yussaini; Nuramirah Shakirah Zulkifli; Nurmaizatul Hanim Syafi Sheik Fuad; Nurul Fatin Fatiah Azman; Siti Nur Arfah Mohd Nor; Siti Nur Atika Shaikh Maznan; Siti Zalia Nasir; Siti Zulaikha Husain	Indonesia; Asri Dewi Prasasti; Dea Destian; Dian Wildiani; Erika Engelika Kbarek; Innes Aditya; Iryani Rumbiak; Lily Erlina Pasaribu; Natasya Naiborhu; Nisa Indira; Nur Anisa; Lispa; Rasgita; Richa Azlia; Salma Maulani; Selly Amalia Florentina; Sri Rahayu; Tiarma Sirait; Widiyana Saruli	Thailand
Women's tournament	Malaysia; Anith Humaira Baharudin; Dayang Nuramirah Abang Mahadini; Fatin Shafika Mahd Sukri; Hanis Nadiah Onn; Juliani Mohamad Din; Khairunnisa Ayuni Mohd Sharuddin; Noor Hasliza Md Ali; Nur Afiqah Syahzani Azhar; Nur Hazlinda Zainal Abidin; Nur Insyirah Effarizal; Nur Nabila Alia Yussaini; Nuramirah Shakirah Zulkifli; Nurmaizatul Hanim Syafi Sheik Fuad; Nurul Fatin Fatiah Azman; Siti Nur Arfah Mohd Nor; Siti Nur Atika Shaikh Maznan; Siti Zalia Nasir; Siti Zulaikha Husain	Indonesia; Asri Dewi Prasasti; Dea Destian; Dian Wildiani; Erika Engelika Kbarek; Innes Aditya; Iryani Rumbiak; Lily Erlina Pasaribu; Natasya Naiborhu; Nisa Indira; Nur Anisa; Lispa; Rasgita; Richa Azlia; Salma Maulani; Selly Amalia Florentina; Sri Rahayu; Tiarma Sirait; Widiyana Saruli	Singapore
