= Water polo at the 2025 SEA Games =

- Venue: Aquatic Center, Thammasat University
- Location: Khlong Luang, Pathum Thani, Thailand
- Date: 15–19 December 2025
- Nations: 5

Medalists
gold medal	Singapore men
gold medal	Thailand women

The water polo competitions at the 2025 SEA Games took place at Aquatic Center, Thammasat University in Khlong Luang, Pathum Thani, Thailand from 15 to 19 December 2025.

== Participating nations ==
Nation	Men	Women
Indonesia	Yes	Yes
Malaysia	Yes	Yes
Philippines	Yes	Yes
Singapore	Yes	Yes
Thailand	Yes	Yes

== Medalists ==
Event	Gold	Silver	Bronze
Men	Singapore	Indonesia	Thailand
Women	Thailand	Singapore	Indonesia

== Medal table ==
* Host nation (Thailand)

Rank	Nation	Gold	Silver	Bronze	Total
1	Singapore	1	1	0	2
2	Thailand*	1	0	1	2
3	Indonesia	0	1	1	2
Totals (3 entries)		2	2	2	6
