= Short-track speed skating at the 2025 SEA Games =

- Venue: Imperial World Samrung Mall
- Location: Samut Prakan, Thailand
- Dates: 18–19 December 2025
- Competitors: 48 from 6 nations

Short-track speed skating competitions at the 2025 SEA Games took place at Imperial World Samrung Mall in Samut Prakan, Thailand from 18 to 19 December 2025. Medals were awarded in 7 events.

== Participating nations ==
- Indonesia (8)
- Malaysia (9)
- Philippines (8)
- Singapore (6)
- Thailand (12) (host)
- Vietnam (5)

== Medal table ==
* Host nation (Thailand)

Rank	Nation	Gold	Silver	Bronze	Total
1	Thailand*	6	1	0	7
2	Philippines	1	1	2	4
3	Indonesia	0	3	3	6
4	Singapore	0	2	2	4
Totals (4 entries)		7	7	7	21

== Medalists ==
Event	Gold	Silver	Bronze
Men's 500 m	Peter Groseclose; Philippines	Ryo Ong Yik; Singapore	Jeremia Wihardja; Indonesia
Men's 1500 m	Chonlachart Taprom; Thailand	Peter Groseclose; Philippines	Marva Putra Firdaus; Indonesia
Men's 5000 m relay	Thailand; Chonlachart Taprom; Thanutcha Chatthaisong; Phooripat Changmai; Prakit Borvornmongkolsak; Chirawat Phonkat; Kritsanapon Phuatrakul	Indonesia; Marva Putra Firdaus; Arsa Putra Firdaus; Kayshan Putra Firdaus; Jeremia Wihardja; Steavanus Wihardja; Radika Rais Ananda	Philippines; Peter Groseclose; Hans Matthew Buemio; Sun Phil Zablan; Jahn Cyruz Asuncion
Women's 500 m	Thanutchaya Chatthaisong; Thailand	Dhinda Salsabila; Indonesia	Alyssa Pok Jing Ying; Singapore
Women's 1500 m	Thanutchaya Chatthaisong; Thailand	Pimpida Leelaprayul; Thailand	Kierana Alexandra; Indonesia
Women's 3000 m relay	Thailand; Thanutchaya Chatthaisong; Pimpida Leelaprayul; Punpreeda Prempreecha; Wimonrat Taphrm; Atiya Jermpatjunya; Kantima Maneewannakul	Singapore; Alyssa Pok Jing Ying; Amelia Rae Lene Chua; Chloe Shan Han Luai; Geok Qin Loh	Philippines; Shaelynn Adrianne Bolos; Ethelmae Jewel Suguitan; Xsandrie Viande Guimba; Renee Cairlyn Benitez
Mixed relay	Thailand; Chonlachart Taprom; Thanutcha Chatthaisong; Phooripat Changmai; Prakit Borvornmongkolsak; Thanutchaya Chatthaisong; Pimpida Leelaprayul; Atiya Jermpatjunya; Kantima Maneewannakul	Indonesia; Marva Putra Firdaus; Arsa Putra Firdaus; Jeremia Wihardja; Steavanus Wihardja; Dhinda Salsabila; Kierana Alexandra	Singapore; Ryo Ong Yik; Brandon Pok Yan Kai; Alyssa Pok Jing Ying; Chloe Shan Han Luai
