= Athletics at the 2025 SEA Games – Women's Results =

The athletics competitions at the 2025 Southeast Asian Games in Thailand were held between 11 and 16 December 2025. Track and field events took place at the Suphachalasai Stadium in Bangkok. The 2025 Games featured competitions in 47 medal events.

== 100 metre ==
Athletics – Women's 100 metre at the 2025 SEA Games
- Venue: Suphachalasai Stadium
- Date: 11 December 2025
- Competitors: 14 from 7 nations

Medalists
| gold medal | Veronica Shanti Pereira | Singapore |
| silver medal | Jirapat Khanonta | Thailand |
| bronze medal | Hà Thị Thu | Vietnam |

=== Records ===
Prior to this competition, the existing Asian and SEA Games records were as follows:

| AR | Li Xuemei (CHN) | 10.79 | Shanghai, China | 18 October 1997 |
| GR | Lydia De Vega (PHI) | 11.28 | Jakarta, Indonesia | 16 September 1987 |

=== Results ===
Heat 1

| Rank | Athlete | Time | Notes |
|---|---|---|---|
| 1 | Veronica Shanti Pereira (SGP) | 11.46 | Q |
| 2 | Khanonta Jirapat (THA) | 11.69 | Q |
| 3 | Hoàng Dư Ý (VIE) | 11.71 | Q |
| 4 | Marie Kristina Knott (PHI) | 11.72 | q |
| 5 | Zaidatul Husniah Zulkifli (MAS) | 11.74 | q |
| 6 | Khonethip Inphachan (LAO) | 12.70 | |
| — | Devi Aprilian (INA) | — | DNS |

Heat 2

| Rank | Athlete | Time | Notes |
|---|---|---|---|
| 1 | Supanich Poolkerd (THA) | 11.57 | Q |
| 2 | Zion Rose Nelson (PHI) | 11.62 | Q |
| 3 | Hà Thị Thu (VIE) | 11.63 | Q |
| 4 | Elizabeth-Ann Tan (SGP) | 11.75 | |
| 5 | Nur Aishah Rofina Aling (MAS) | 11.80 | |
| 6 | Silina Pha Aphay (LAO) | 12.47 | |
| — | Dina Aulia (INA) | — | DNS |

Finals

| Rank | Athlete | Time | Notes |
|---|---|---|---|
| 1st place, gold medalist(s) | Veronica Shanti Pereira (SGP) | 11.36 | |
| 2nd place, silver medalist(s) | Khanonta Jirapat (THA) | 11.54 | |
| 3rd place, bronze medalist(s) | Hà Thị Thu (VIE) | 11.58 | |
| 4 | Supanich Poolkerd (THA) | 11.61 | |
| 5 | Zion Rose Nelson (PHI) | 11.70 | |
| 6 | Marie Kristina Knott (PHI) | 11.71 | |
| 7 | Zaidatul Husniah Zulkifli (MAS)} | 11.87 | |
| — | Du Y Hoang (VIE) | — | DNS |

== 400 metre ==
Athletics – Women's 400 metre at the 2025 SEA Games
- Venue: Suphachalasai Stadium
- Date: 12 December 2025
- Competitors: 6 from 3 nations

Medalists
| gold medal | Nguyễn Thị Ngọc | Vietnam |
| silver medal | Chinenye Josephine Onuorah | Thailand |
| bronze medal | Jeralyn Rodriguez | Philippines |

=== Records ===
Prior to this competition, the existing Asian and SEA Games records were as follows:

| AR | Kemi Adekoya (BHR) | 51.45 | Portland, United States | 19 March 2016 |
| GR | Nguyễn Thị Tĩnh (VIE) | 51.83 | Hanoi, Vietnam | 8 December 2003 |

=== Results ===
Finals

| Rank | Athlete | Time | Notes |
|---|---|---|---|
| 1st place, gold medalist(s) | Nguyễn Thị Ngọc (VIE) | 52.74 | |
| 2nd place, silver medalist(s) | Chinenye Josephine Onuorah (THA) | 52.93 | |
| 3rd place, bronze medalist(s) | Jeralyn Rodriguez (PHI) | 53.40 | |
| 4 | Benny Nontanam (THA) | 54.02 | |
| 5 | Hoàng Thị Minh Hạnh (VIE) | | |
| 6 | Angel Rene Watson (PHI) | | |

== 1500 metre ==
Athletics – Women's 1500 metre at the 2025 SEA Games
- Venue: Suphachalasai Stadium
- Date: 11 December 2025
- Competitors: 7 from 5 nations

Medalists
| gold medal | Bùi Thị Ngân | Vietnam |
| silver medal | Nguyễn Khánh Linh | Vietnam |
| bronze medal | Susan Ramadan | Philippines |

=== Records ===
Prior to this competition, the existing Asian and SEA Games records were as follows:

| AR | Qu Yunxia (CHN) | 3:50.46 | Beijing, China | 11 September 1993 |
| GR | Trương Thanh Hằng (VIE) | 4:11.60 | Nakhon Ratchasima, Thailand | 7 December 2007 |

=== Results ===
| Rank | Athlete | Final |
|---|---|---|
| 1st place, gold medalist(s) | Bùi Thị Ngân (VIE) | 4:27.34 |
| 2nd place, silver medalist(s) | Nguyễn Khánh Linh (VIE) | 4:29.76 |
| 3rd place, bronze medalist(s) | Susan Ramadan (PHI) | 4:38.74 |
| 4 | Pareeya Sonsem (THA) | 4:42.77 |
| 5 | Naomi Cesar (PHI) | 4:45.59 |
| 6 | Lodkeo Inthakoumman (LAO) | 4:47.94 |
| 7 | Angela Freitas De Fatima Araujo (TLS) | 5:29.88 |

== 5000 metre ==
Athletics – Women's 5000 metre at the 2025 SEA Games
- Venue: Suphachalasai Stadium
- Date: 13 December 2025
- Competitors: 7 from 5 nations
- Winning time: 16:27.13

Medalists
| gold medal | Nguyễn Thị Oanh | Vietnam |
| silver medal | Lê Thị Tuyết | Vietnam |
| bronze medal | Joida Gagnao | Philippines |

=== Records ===
Prior to this competition, the existing Asian and SEA Games records were as follows:

| AR | Jiang Bo (CHN) | 14:28.09 | Shanghai, China | 23 October 1997 |
| GR | Triyaningsih (INA) | 15:54.32 | Nakhon Ratchasima, Thailand | 8 December 2007 |

=== Results ===
The final was held on 13 December, starting at 18:45 (UTC+7) in the evening.

| Rank | Athlete | Time |
|---|---|---|
| 1st place, gold medalist(s) | Nguyễn Thị Oanh (VIE) | 16:27.13 |
| 2nd place, silver medalist(s) | Lê Thị Tuyết (VIE) | 16:34.06 |
| 3rd place, bronze medalist(s) | Joida Gagnao (PHI) | 17:09.87 |
| 4 | Vanessa Lee (SGP) | 17:31.85 |
| 5 | Nicole Low Sui Xuan (SGP) | 17:45.37 |
| 6 | Pareeya Sonsem (THA) | 18:08.58 |
| 7 | Jessa Mae Roda (PHI) | 18:19.14 |
| 8 | Jesus De Abita (TLS) | 18:19.14 |
| 9 | Freitas De Fatima Araujo Angela (PHI) | 21:21.64 |
| – | Odekta Elvina Naibaho (INA) | DSQ |
| – | Lodkeo Inthakoumman (LAO) | DSQ |

== Discus throw ==
Athletics – Women's discus throw at the 2025 SEA Games
- Venue: Suphachalasai Stadium
- Date: 11 December 2025
- Competitors: 6 from 4 nations

Medalists
| gold medal | Subenrat Insaeng | Thailand |
| silver medal | Queenie Ting Kung Ni | Malaysia |
| bronze medal | Lê Thị Cẩm Dung | Vietnam |

=== Records ===
Prior to this competition, the existing Asian and SEA Games records were as follows:

| AR | Xiao Yanling (CHN) | 71.68 m | Beijing, China | 14 March 1992 |
| GR | Subenrat Insaeng (THA) | 60.33 m | New Clark City, Philippines | 9 December 2019 |

=== Results ===
| Rank | Athlete | Mark | Notes |
|---|---|---|---|
| 1st place, gold medalist(s) | Subenrat Insaeng (THA) | 58.86 | |
| 2nd place, silver medalist(s) | Queenie Ting Kung Ni (MAS) | 51.81 | |
| 3rd place, bronze medalist(s) | Lê Thị Cẩm Dung (VIE) | 49.34 | |
| 4 | Nur Atiqah Sufiah Md Harnizam (MAS) | 46.38 | |
| 5 | Daniella Daynata (PHI) | 45.00 | |
| 6 | Paphatson Loain (THA) | 41.64 | |

== Hammer throw ==
Athletics – Women's discus throw at the 2025 SEA Games
- Venue: Suphachalasai Stadium
- Date: 12 December 2025
- Competitors: 6 from 4 nations

Medalists
| gold medal | Grace Wong | Malaysia |
| silver medal | Mingkamon Koomphon | Thailand |
| bronze medal | Sawitree Kaewasuksri | Thailand |

=== Records ===
Prior to this competition, the existing Asian and SEA Games records were as follows:

| AR | Wang Zheng (CHN) | 77.68 m | Chengdu, China | 29 March 2014 |
| GR | Grace Wong (MAS) | 59.24 m | Hanoi, Vietnam | 18 May 2022 |

=== Results ===
| Rank | Athlete | Round | | | | | | Mark | Notes |
| Rank | Athlete | 1 | 2 | 3 | 4 | 5 | 6 | Mark | Notes |
|---|---|---|---|---|---|---|---|---|---|
| 1st place, gold medalist(s) | Grace Wong (MAS) | 63.34 | 63.83 | 65.09 | 65.41 | 64.01 | 64.42 | 65.41 | GR, NR |
| 2nd place, silver medalist(s) | Mingkamon Koomphon (THA) | 59.88 | x | 59.63 | x | x | 60.74 | 60.74 | |
| 3rd place, bronze medalist(s) | Sawitree Kaewasuksri (THA) | 53.98 | 56.27 | 54.44 | 55.04 | 55.10 | 53.94 | 56.27 | |
| 4 | Thwe Thwe Moe (MYA) | x | 52.85 | x | 52.44 | 50.12 | 52.78 | 52.85 | |
| 5 | Nurul Hidayah Lukman (MAS) | 48.76 | 52.21 | x | x | 51.66 | x | 52.21 | |
| 6 | Amanda Javellana (PHI) | 48.92 | 49.28 | 51.97 | x | 48.89 | 51.12 | 51.97 | |

== Pole vault ==
Athletics – Women's pole vault at the SEA Games
- Venue: Suphachalasai Stadium
- Date: 11 December 2025
- Competitors: 6 from 4 nations

Medalists
| gold medal | Diva Renatta Jayadi | Indonesia |
| silver medal | Chonthicha Khabut | Thailand |
| bronze medal | Chayanisa Chomchuendee | Thailand |

=== Records ===
Prior to this competition, the existing Asian and SEA Games records were as follows:

| AR | Li Ling (CHN) | 4.72 m | Shanghai, China | 18 May 2019 |
| GR | Natalie Uy (PHI) | 4.25 m | New Clark City, Philippines | 8 December 2019 |

=== Results ===
| Rank | Athlete | Mark | Notes |
|---|---|---|---|
| 1st place, gold medalist(s) | Diva Renatta Jayadi (INA) | 4.35 | GR, NR |
| 2nd place, silver medalist(s) | Chonthicha Khabut (THA) | 4.05 | |
| 3rd place, bronze medalist(s) | Chayanisa Chomchuendee (THA) | 3.90 | |
| 3rd place, bronze medalist(s) | Maria Andriani Melabessy (INA) | 3.90 | |
| 5 | Alyana Joyce Nicolas (PHI) | 3.75 | |
| 6 | Nor Sarah Adi (MAS) | 3.60 | |

== Javelin throw ==
Athletics – Women's javelin throw at the SEA Games
- Venue: Suphachalasai Stadium
- Date: 13 December 2025
- Competitors: 6 from 4 nations

Medalists
| gold medal | Jariya Wichaidit | Thailand |
| silver medal | Ng Jing Xuan | Malaysia |
| bronze medal | Bhianca Ana Espenilla | Philippines |

=== Records ===
Prior to this competition, the existing Asian and SEA Games records were as follows:

| AR | Lü Huihui (CHN) | 67.98 m | Shenyang, China | 2 August 2019 |
| GR | Lò Thị Hoàng (VIE) | 59.24 m | Kuala Lumpur, Malaysia | 24 August 2017 |

=== Results ===
| Rank | Athlete | Round | | | | | | Mark |
| Rank | Athlete | 1 | 2 | 3 | 4 | 5 | 6 | Mark |
|---|---|---|---|---|---|---|---|---|
| 1st place, gold medalist(s) | Jariya Wichaidit (THA) | 47.90 | 50.94 | 55.49 | 55.64 | 53.90 | 49.82 | 55.64 |
| 2nd place, silver medalist(s) | Ng Jing Xuan (MAS) | 42.63 | 52.17 | 47.90 | 48.87 | x | x | 52.17 NR |
| 3rd place, bronze medalist(s) | Bhianca Ana Espenilla (PHI) | x | 45.15 | 48.67 | 45.62 | 45.37 | 51.66 | 51.66 |
| 4 | Atinna Nurkamila Intan Bahtiar (INA) | 51.06 | 46.44 | 48.61 | 45.63 | 47.84 | 49.11 | 51.06 |
| 5 | Evalyn Palabrica (PHI) | 43.89 | 46.23 | 47.08 | x | 44.65 | 42.94 | 43.28 |
| 6 | Panatsaya Meesin (THA) | 46.21 | 44.48 | x | x | 45.22 | 44.38 | 46.21 |
