= Rugby sevens at the 2025 SEA Games =

- Venue: Dhupatemiya Stadium, Lam Luk Ka
- Location: Pathum Thani, Thailand
- Dates: 13–14 December 2025
- Nations: 6

Champions
- Men: Thailand
- Women: Thailand

Rugby sevens competitions at the 2025 SEA Games took place at Dhupatemiya Stadium in Lam Luk Ka, Pathum Thani, Thailand from 13 to 14 December 2025. Medals were awarded in 2 events, which are men and women tournament.

== Participating nations ==
Nation	Men	Women
Indonesia	No	Yes
Laos	Yes	No
Malaysia	Yes	Yes
Philippines	Yes	Yes
Singapore	Yes	Yes
Thailand	Yes	Yes
Total: 6 NOCs	5	5

== Medal table ==
* Host nation (Thailand)

Rank	Nation	Gold	Silver	Bronze	Total
1	Thailand*	2	0	0	2
2	Singapore	0	1	1	2
3	Malaysia	0	1	0	1
4	Philippines	0	0	1	1
Totals (4 entries)		2	2	2	6

== Medalists ==
Event	Gold	Silver	Bronze
Men's tournament	Thailand; Ratchanon Chitpavanasakul; Peerapol Chukoun; Witchapho Dechmani; Unnop Inprom; Thanakit Jakchai; Sarut Janda; Wuttikorn Kaewkhiao; Noppasit Kradkrayang; Pachara Polpathapee; Wuttipong Sakulthianthong; Tanawin Thanathanint; Akarin Thitisakulvit; Kerdkao Wechokittikorn	Singapore; Gideon An Kee; Samuel Giap Yang Koh; Julian Tze An Leow; Daryl Guo Zhi Liau; Ishraf Marah Hoessein Marah; Mohammad Jamian Abdullah; Muhammad Farhan Amran; Muhammad Nur Hidayat Jeffrydin; Bao Yuan Ng; Michael Andriesz Sean; Chong Yao Teng; Jonathan Hong Jia Wong; Yew Hon Maurice Wong	Philippines; Raphael Jose Pierre Barberis; Harrison Philip Blake; Michael Moses Blatteis; Donald Keith Coleman; Clifford Joe Dawson; Robert John Fogerty; Edlen Gil Robert Hernandez; Rafael Enrique Phillips; Nicholas Robertson; Jerome Lloyd Rudder; Luc Stefan Smith; Ned Ralph Stephenson; Kai Kristian Stroem
Women's tournament	Thailand; Dion Akwaja; Phanthira Chaiket; Thanaporn Huankid; Panpassa Jaijarim; Darin Jantamala; Uthumporn Liamrat; Narathip Maneesai; Wannaree Meechok; Laksina Nawakaew; Salinda Phaekhwamdee; Thanachporn Wandee; Rattanaporn Wittayaronnayut; Nuntadchaporn Yodya	Malaysia; Nurin Hannan Abd Hadi; Nur Aliya Balqis Abdul Rahman; Alvyromela Antonius; Noor Azzuwa Azhar; Nur Izzah Azizan; Josie Mavcellina Gone; Kajolin Jenisin; Valerie Juan; Wan Noor Shafiqa Mohd Radza; Rozliana Mohd Ridwan; Dinah Syafiqah Sadali; Nur Alyia Nabila Samsubahari; Siti Nusyamimi Tajudin	Singapore; Jayne Jing Yi Chan; Victoria Anasarias Chew; Hui Min Chong; Liling Beverly Lim; Guang Lyn Amanda Ng; Nur Sabrina Azmi; Liyana Ilyas Ong; Pei Yi Ong; Pazel Jing Xuan Poh; Pei Qi Lily Sim; Nicole Zhi Yu Tan; Samantha Ming Li Teo; Yuan Shan Felicia Teoh
