= Gladies Lariesa Garina =

Indonesian diver (born 2006)

Personal information
- Full name: Gladies Lariesa Garina Haga Kore
- Born: 26 March 2006 (age 20) East Java, Indonesia
- Height: 1.51 m (4 ft 11 in)

Sport
- Country: Indonesia
- Sport: Diving
- Event(s): 1 m, 3 m, 3 m synchro
Medal record
Diving
Representing Indonesia
Asian Championships
Bronze medal – third place	2025 Ahmedabad	3 m springboard
Bronze medal – third place	2025 Ahmedabad	10 m synchro platform
SEA Games
Silver medal – second place	2023 Cambodia	3 m springboard
Bronze medal – third place	2023 Cambodia	platform
Silver medal – second place	2025 Thailand	synchronised platform

Gladies Lariesa Garina Haga Kore (born 26 March 2006) is an Indonesian diver. She is the youngest Indonesian diver to champion three senior national competitions.

== Career ==
Gladies Lariesa Garina Haga Kore made her diving competition debut at the 2021 Pekan Olahraga Nasional in Papua, where she won three gold medals. She was the only Indonesian diver competing at the 2022 World Aquatics Championships in Budapest.

== Competition history ==
=== International Competition ===
Competition	2019	2020	2021	2022	2023	2024
Southeast Asian Games					Silver; Bronze	
Asian Games				8th 12th		
FINA Diving Grand Prix	10th			4th Bronze		
FINA World Championship				29th 38th	27th 31st 12th 22nd	14th 31st 45th 6th
