= Bowling at the 2025 SEA Games =

2025 SEA Games
- Venue: Blu-O Rhythm & Bowl, Major Cineplex Ratchayothin Mall
- Location: Chatuchak, Bangkok, Thailand
- Dates: 14–19 December 2025

Bowling competitions at the 2025 SEA Games took place at Blu-O Rhythm & Bowl, Major Cineplex Ratchayothin Mall in Muang Thong Thani, Pak Kret, Nonthaburi, from 14 to 19 December 2025.

== Medal table ==
* Host nation (Thailand)

| Rank | Nation | Gold | Silver | Bronze | Total |
|---|---|---|---|---|---|
| 1 | Malaysia | 2 | 1 | 4 | 7 |
| 2 | Singapore | 2 | 0 | 4 | 6 |
| 3 | Philippines | 1 | 0 | 1 | 2 |
| 4 | Vietnam | 1 | 0 | 0 | 1 |
| 5 | Thailand* | 0 | 3 | 1 | 4 |
| 6 | Indonesia | 0 | 2 | 2 | 4 |
| Totals (6 entries) | | 6 | 6 | 12 | 24 |

== Medalists ==
=== Men ===
| Event | Gold | Silver | Bronze |
|---|---|---|---|
| Singles | Trần Hoàng Khôi; Vietnam | Napat Buspanikonkul; Thailand | Muhd Syazirol Shamsudin; Malaysia |
| Singles | Trần Hoàng Khôi; Vietnam | Napat Buspanikonkul; Thailand | Mark Jesus San Jose; Philippines |
| Doubles | Malaysia; Muhd Syazirol Shamsudin; Muhammad Rafiq Ismail | Thailand; Lapasdanai Chusaeng; Vilinkorn Kledkaew | Malaysia; Tun Ameerul Luqman Al-Hakim; Tsen Fan Yew |
| Doubles | Malaysia; Muhd Syazirol Shamsudin; Muhammad Rafiq Ismail | Thailand; Lapasdanai Chusaeng; Vilinkorn Kledkaew | Singapore; Nu'man Syahmi bin Yusri; Jomond Chia Yu Sun |
| Team of four | Philippines; Kenneth Chua; Marc Dylan Custodio; Artegal Barrientos; Mark Jesus San Jose | Thailand; Vilinkorn Kledkaew; Lapasdanai Chusaeng; Supakrit Wantasuk; Napat Buspanikonkul | Malaysia; Muhammad Rafiq Ismail; Muhd Syazirol Shamsudin; Tsen Fan Yew; Tun Ameerul Luqman Al-Hakim |
| Team of four | Philippines; Kenneth Chua; Marc Dylan Custodio; Artegal Barrientos; Mark Jesus San Jose | Thailand; Vilinkorn Kledkaew; Lapasdanai Chusaeng; Supakrit Wantasuk; Napat Buspanikonkul | Singapore; Ryan Toh Hong-rui; Jomond Chia Yu Sun; Nu'man Syahmi bin Yusri; Mike Ong Jing Loong |

=== Women ===
| Event | Gold | Silver | Bronze |
|---|---|---|---|
| Singles | Charmaine Chang Yu Qian; Singapore | Natasha Roslan; Malaysia | Colleen Pee; Singapore |
| Singles | Charmaine Chang Yu Qian; Singapore | Natasha Roslan; Malaysia | Sharon Limansantoso; Indonesia |
| Doubles | Singapore; Arianne Tay Kai Lin; Charmaine Chang Yu Qian | Indonesia; Putty Armein; Alisha Nabila Larasati | Malaysia; Nur Hazirah Ramli; Adania Redzwan |
| Doubles | Singapore; Arianne Tay Kai Lin; Charmaine Chang Yu Qian | Indonesia; Putty Armein; Alisha Nabila Larasati | Indonesia; Sharon Limansantoso; Aldila Indryati |
| Team of four | Malaysia; Nur Hazirah Ramli; Adania Redzwan; Jane Sin Li; Natasha Roslan | Indonesia; Sharon Limansantoso; Aldila Indryati; Putty Armein; Alisha Nabila Larasati | Singapore; Arianne Tay Kai Lin; Charmaine Chang Yu Qian; Colleen Pee; Nur Irdina binte Hazly |
| Team of four | Malaysia; Nur Hazirah Ramli; Adania Redzwan; Jane Sin Li; Natasha Roslan | Indonesia; Sharon Limansantoso; Aldila Indryati; Putty Armein; Alisha Nabila Larasati | Thailand; Pinmanus Khumchaipoom; Ramita Sarntong; Phattaranan Pingchittapraphai; Chawakorn Wutti |
