= Singapore at the 2025 SEA Games =

- IOC code: SGP
- NOC: Singapore National Olympic Council
- Website: www.singaporeolympics.com

in Bangkok-Chonburi, Thailand
- Competitors: 930 in 48 sports
- Flag bearers: Noah Lim (Jujitsu); Yeo Jia Min (Badminton)
- Medals Ranked 5th: Gold 52 Silver 61 Bronze 89 Total 202

SEA Games appearances (overview)
- 1959; 1961; 1965; 1967; 1969; 1971; 1973; 1975; 1977; 1979; 1981; 1983; 1985; 1987; 1989; 1991; 1993; 1995; 1997; 1999; 2001; 2003; 2005; 2007; 2009; 2011; 2013; 2015; 2017; 2019; 2021; 2023; 2025; 2027; 2029

Singapore sent a delegation to compete at the 2025 SEA Games held in Bangkok and Chonbori, Thailand from 9 to 20 December 2025. This was the largest contingent sent to the Games partly due to the number of sports.

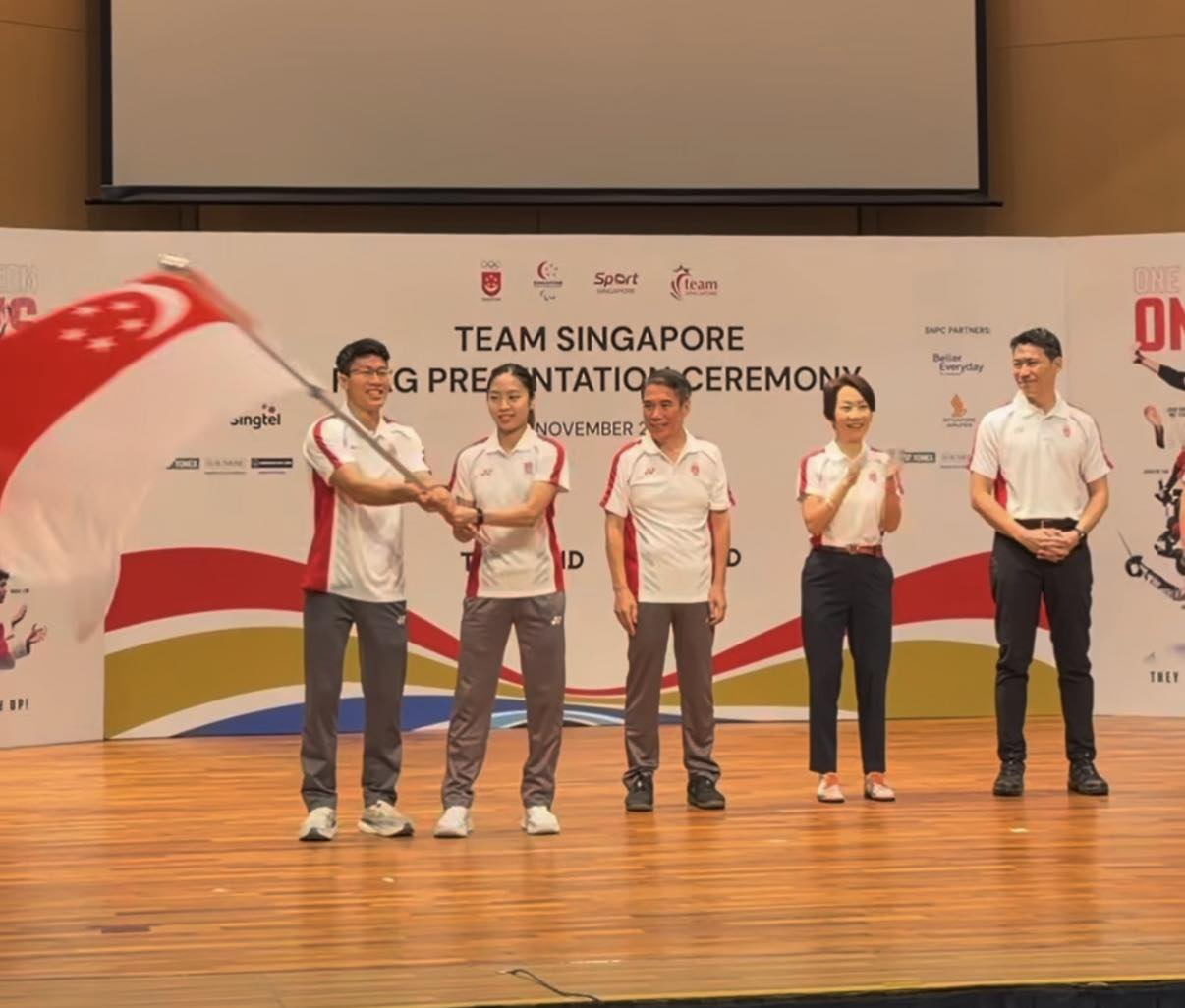
Team Singapore flag bearers for SEA Games 2025; held during the Flag Presentation Ceremony on 8 November 2025

The team were led by chef-de-mission Mr Lawrence Leow; President of Singapore Badminton Association and SNOC vice-president. The flag bearers were Noah Lim from jujitsu and Yeo Jia Min from badminton.

== Competitors ==
An initial 762 athletes were preliminary selected on 6 August competing in 42 sports at the Games. Sports Association could submit appeals until the end of the month.

On 28 August, Singapore's delegation size increased to 980 athletes competing in 48 sports following successful appeals. After the entry by athlete registration, the official number of athletes heading to the Games was 930.

Among those who were selected is long-distance runner Soh Rui Yong as well as the men's football team. Besides them, a slew of silat and muay thai athletes were also included in the latest list; together with the men and women's kabaddi teams, women's dragon boat team, men's sepak takraw and indoor volleyball team. The national handball and woodball teams received the nod.

No athletes were fielded in Pétanque and Teqball as well as Jetski & Polo.

== Games summary ==
=== Summary ===
At the end of the Games, Team Singapore achieved the best ever medal haul in an away Games of 202 medals.

In addition, they top the standings in swimming, fencing and table tennis and achieved historic first in many sports. Among them, Avvir Tham and Calvin Quek won Singapore's first gold medal in 60 years in men's diving and 400m hurdles respectively, with Marissa Hafezan winning Singapore's first gold in karate in 35 years. Shanti Pereira becomes the first Singaporean to complete a "double-double" at the Games and Quah Ting Wen becomes the country's most bemedalled athlete at the SEA Games.

Mikkel Lee, Julia Yeo, Gan Ching Hwee and Letitia Sim received commendation for their efforts.

However, the men's football team received an earful from officials for poor sportsmanship, no energy, no passion and no skills.

=== Medals by sport ===
Medals by sport
Sport	1st place, gold medalist(s)	2nd place, silver medalist(s)	3rd place, bronze medalist(s)	Total
Archery	1	2	0	3
Artistic Swimming (Aquatics)	1	1	0	2
Athletics	3	3	3	9
Badminton	0	0	2	2
Baseball and Softball	0	2	0	2
Basketball	0	1	0	1
Billiards	1	1	3	5
Bowling	2	0	4	6
Boxing	0	2	3	5
Canoeing	1	2	1	4
Chess	0	0	3	3
Cricket	0	0	2	2
Cycling	0	1	0	1
Diving (Aquatics)	1	2	1	4
Dragon boat	0	0	0	0
Equestrian	0	0	1	1
E-Sports	0	0	0	0
Extreme Sports (Note: Extreme sports consist of Jetski, Skateboarding, Sport climbing, Water skiing and wakeboarding)	0	2	1	3
Fencing	8	3	2	13
Floorball	0	1	1	2
Football	0	0	0	0
Golf	0	1	0	1
Gymnastics	0	4	1	5
Handball	0	0	2	2
Hockey (Note: Field & Indoor hockey)	0	0	4	4
Ice hockey	0	0	1	1
Ice skating	0	2	2	4
Judo	0	0	3	3
Ju-jitsu	1	2	2	5
Kabaddi	0	0	6	6
Karate	1	0	1	2
Kickboxing	0	0	1	1
Modern Pentathlon	0	0	0	0
Muaythai	0	1	2	3
Netball	0	1	0	1
Open Water Swimming (Aquatics)	0	2	1	3
Pencak silat	1	2	2	5
Rowing	0	0	0	0
Rugby sevens	0	1	1	2
Sailing	4	4	2	10
Sepak Takraw	0	0	0	0
Shooting	2	2	4	8
Squash	0	0	4	4
Swimming (Aquatics)	19	8	7	34
Table Tennis	4	1	2	7
Taekwondo	1	1	2	4
Tennis	0	0	0	0
Triathlon (Note: Also consist of Aquathlon and Duathlon)	0	3	4	7
Volleyball	0	0	0	0
Water Polo (Aquatics)	1	1	0	2
Weightlifting	0	0	0	0
Woodball	0	0	2	2
Wrestling	0	0	2	2
Wushu	0	2	4	6
Total	52	61	89	202 (Note: Singapore clinch 1 bronze in Tug of War 560KG Mixed Team & 1 Silver in Ultimate Mixed Division. However as it’s a demonstration sport, it’s not included in official tally)

=== Medals by date ===
Medals by date
Day	Date	1st place, gold medalist(s)	2nd place, silver medalist(s)	3rd place, bronze medalist(s)	Total
0	9 December	Opening ceremony			
1	10 December	5	4	5	14
2	11 December	4	6	8	18
3	12 December	6	6	7	19
4	13 December	4	3	7	14
5	14 December	8	10	8	26
6	15 December	7	3	10	20
7	16 December	3	3	14	20
8	17 December	9	7	9	25
9	18 December	2	9	13	24
10	19 December	4	9	8	21
11	20 December	0	1	0	1
Total		52	61	89	202

=== Medalist ===
Medalist are arranged in order of colour and date.

Medal	Athlete	Sport	Event	Date
Gold	Izaac Quek	Table tennis	Men’s Singles	19 Dec
Gold	Amita Berthier; Maxine Wong; Cheung Kemei; Stephanie Lee	Fencing	Women’s Foil	19 Dec
Gold	Simon Lee Renjie; Si To Jia Tong; Azfar Luqman Ong; Bron Sheum	Fencing	Men’s Epee	19 Dec
Gold	Men’s Team	Water polo	Men’s Team	19 Dec
Gold	Kiria Tikanah; Elle Koh; Filzah Hidayah; Esther Tan	Fencing	Women’s Epee	18 Dec
Gold	Samuel Elijah Robson; Jonathan Lim; Raphael Tan; Julian Soh	Fencing	Men’s Foil	18 Dec
Gold	Izaac Quek; Koen Pang	Table tennis	Men’s Doubles	17 Dec
Gold	Zeng Jian; Koen Pang	Table tennis	Mixed Doubles	17 Dec
Gold	Charmaine Chang; Arianne Tay	Bowling	Women’s Doubles	17 Dec
Gold	Amita Berthier	Fencing	Women’s Foil	17 Dec
Gold	Avvir Tham	Diving	Men’s 1M Springboard	17 Dec
Gold	Max Maeder	Sailing	Men’s Formula Kite	17 Dec
Gold	Li Yue Long; Tabitha Yeo	Archery	Mixed Recurve Team	17 Dec
Gold	Dhani Andika	Pencak silat	Men’s Tanding U45KG	17 Dec
Gold	Adele Tan; Martina Amos; Jasmine Ser	Shooting	Women’s 50m Rifle 3 Positions	17 Dec
Gold	Juliet Heng	Fencing	Women’s Sabre	16 Dec
Gold	Elle Koh	Fencing	Women’s Epee	16 Dec
Gold	Raphael Tan	Fencing	Men’s Foil	16 Dec
Gold	Quah Ting Wen; Quah Jing Wen; Letitia Sim; Julia Yeo	Swimming	Women’s 4x100m Medley	15 Dec
Gold	Quah Zheng Wen	Swimming	Men’s 200m Back	15 Dec
Gold	Gan Ching Hwee	Swimming	Women’s 800m Free	15 Dec
Gold	Chan Jun Hao	Swimming	Men’s 50m Breast	15 Dec
Gold	Quah Ting Wen	Swimming	Women’s 50m Fly	15 Dec
Gold	Calvin Quek	Athletics	Men’s 400m Hurdles	15 Dec
Gold	Charmaine Chang	Bowling	Women’s Singles	15 Dec
Gold	Clarence Chew; Izaac Quek; Koen Pang; Josh Chua; Ellsworth Le	Table tennis	Men’s Team	14 Dec
Gold	Quah Zheng Wen; Jonathan Tan; Ardi Azman; Mikkel Lee	Swimming	Men’s 4x100m Free	14 Dec
Gold	Letitia Sim	Swimming	Women’s 200m Breast	14 Dec
Gold	Teong Tzen Wei	Swimming	Men’s 50m Fly	14 Dec
Gold	Amanda Lim	Swimming	Women’s 50m Free	14 Dec
Gold	Ryan Lo	Sailing	Men’s ILCA 7	14 Dec
Gold	Jania Ang	Sailing	Women’s ILCA 6	14 Dec
Gold	Ethan Chia	Sailing	Boy’s Optimist	14 Dec
Gold	Shanti Pereira	Athletics	Women’s 200m	13 Dec
Gold	Letitia Sim	Swimming	Women’s 100m Breaststroke	13 Dec
Gold	Quah Zheng Wen	Swimming	Men’s 100m Fly	13 Dec
Gold	Quah Ting Wen	Swimming	Women’s 100m Fly	13 Dec
Gold	Quah Zheng Wen; Jonathan Tan; Chan Jun Hao; Mikkel Lee	Swimming	Men’s 4x100m Medley	12 Dec
Gold	Gan Ching Hwee	Swimming	Women’s 400m Free	12 Dec
Gold	Low Jiang Hao	Shooting	Men’s Shotgun Skeet	12 Dec
Gold	Peter Gilchrist	Billiards	Men’s English Billiards	12 Dec
Gold	Marissa Hafezan	Karate	Women’s Kumite U55KG	12 Dec
Gold	Debbie Soh; Yvette Chong	Artistic swimming	Women’s Duet	12 Dec
Gold	Letitia Sim	Swimming	Women’s 200M IM	11 Dec
Gold	Veronica Shanti Pereira	Athletics	Women’s 100m	11 Dec
Gold	Gan Ching Hwee	Swimming	Women’s 200m Free	11 Dec
Gold	Mikkel Lee	Swimming	Men’s 50m Free	11 Dec
Gold	Letitia Sim	Swimming	Women’s 50m Breast	10 Dec
Gold	Mikkel Lee	Swimming	Men’s 100m Free	10 Dec
Gold	Stephenie Chen; Lucas Teo	Canoeing	Mixed K2 500m	10 Dec
Gold	Jedd Tan	Jujitsu	Men’s U77KG	10 Dec
Gold	Diyanah Aqidah; Nicholas Khaw	Taekwondo	Mixed Pair Recognised Poomsae	10 Dec
Silver	Gan Ching Hwee; Chantal Liew; Artyom Lukasevits; Russel Pang	Open Water Swimming	Mixed Relay Team	20 Dec
Silver	Ainslee Kwang; Ryenne Cham	Diving	Women’s 10M Synchronised Platform	19 Dec
Silver	Velvan Tan	Boxing	Men’s 69KG	19 Dec
Silver	Leah-diane Warden	Boxing	Women’s 66KG	19 Dec
Silver	Women’s Team	Water polo	Women’s Team	19 Dec
Silver	Women’s Team	Softball	Women’s Team	19 Dec
Silver	Chloe Luai; Amelia Chua; Alyssa Pok; Loh Geok Qin	Speed skating	Women’s Speed Skating Relay	19 Dec
Silver	Ryo Ong Yik	Speed skating	Men’s 500M	19 Dec
Silver	Marat Lleyton Veloso	Shooting	Men’s 50M Rifle 3 Positions	19 Dec
Silver	Women’s Team	Floorball	Women’s Team	19 Dec
Silver	Men’s Team	Softball	Men’s Team	18 Dec
Silver	Valencia Tan	Cycling (Track)	Women's Scratch	18 Dec
Silver	Avvir Tham	Diving	Men’s 3M Springboard	18 Dec
Silver	Madeleine Ong	Archery	Women's Compound Individual	18 Dec
Silver	Juliet Heng; Lim Jia En; Christine Tan; Tan Ruo Ting	Fencing	Women’s Sabre	18 Dec
Silver	Chantal Liew	Open Water Swimming	Women's 10KM	18 Dec
Silver	Madeleine Ong; Ellie Low; Low Wan Qi	Archery	Women's Compound Team	18 Dec
Silver	Ian David Thomas; Loo Wing Kien; Wee Ewe Lay Laurence	Shooting	Men’s Shotgun Compak Sporting Team	18 Dec
Silver	Louisa Marie Middleditch; Rachel Hew; Ng Xuan Jie	Duathlon	Women's Team Relay	18 Dec
Silver	Ginny Teo	Muaythai	Women’s 54KG	17 Dec
Silver	Maxine Wong	Fencing	Women’s Foil	17 Dec
Silver	Women’s Team	Netball	Women’s Team	17 Dec
Silver	Angel Chew	Sailing	Women’s IQFoil	17 Dec
Silver	Elkan Oh	Sailing	Men’s IQFoil	17 Dec
Silver	Sheik Ferdous	Pencak silat	Men’s Tanding Class I	17 Dec
Silver	Bryce Chong; Luke Chua; Tey Yi Jun	Triathlon	Men’s Relay Team	17 Dec
Silver	Kiria Tikanah	Fencing	Women’s Epee	16 Dec
Silver	Mikayla Angeline Yang	Gymnastics (Rhythmic)	Women’s IAA	16 Dec
Silver	Bryce Chong; Tey Yi Jun; Luke Chua	Aquathlon	Men’s Team	16 Dec
Silver	Chia Teck Ian; Clarence Aloysious Batchelor; Isabella Tan; Nurul Farhan; Tara Lim; Tyan Foong	Wakeboarding	Mixed Cable Wakeboard Team	15 Dec
Silver	Tay Yu Xuan	Wushu	Men’s Taijijian & Taijiquan	15 Dec
Silver	Randall Lim	Wushu	Men’s Nanquan/Nandao/Nangun	15 Dec
Silver	Zeng Jian; Ser Lin Qian; Tan Zhao Yun; Chloe Lai; Loy Ming Ying	Table tennis	Women’s Team	14 Dec
Silver	Men’s Team	Rugby 7s	Men’s Team	14 Dec
Silver	Maximillian Ang	Swimming	Men’s 100m Breast	14 Dec
Silver	Quah Zheng Wen	Swimming	Men’s 50m Fly	14 Dec
Silver	Vanessa Teng	Sport climbing	Women's boulder	14 Dec
Silver	Muhammad Affiz; Muhammad Nazrul; Muhammadinl Mustafarah	Pencak silat	Men’s Regu (Seni)	14 Dec
Silver	Austin Yeo	Sailing	Boys ILCA 4	14 Dec
Silver	Anya Zahedi	Sailing	Girl’s Optimist	14 Dec
Silver	Peter Gilchrist; Karthik	Billiards	Men’s English Billiards Doubles	14 Dec
Silver	Inez Ng; Chen Xingtong; Valencia Chang	Golf	Women’s Team	14 Dec
Silver	Marc Brian Louis	Athletics	Men’s 200m	13 Dec
Silver	Quah Jing Wen	Swimming	Women’s 100m Fly	13 Dec
Silver	Caitlyn Tan; Claire Tan; Kiera Lee; Rachel Ho; Rae-Anne Ong; Debbie Soh; Rhea Thean; Thean Rachel; Yvette Chong Ann	Artistic swimming	Women’s Team	13 Dec
Silver	Kampton Kam	Athletics	Men’s High Jump	12 Dec
Silver	Ang Chen Xiang	Athletics	Men’s 110m Hurdles	12 Dec
Silver	Emma Yap	Gymnastics	Women’s Floor	12 Dec
Silver	Amanda Yap	Gymnastics	Women’s Balance Beam	12 Dec
Silver	Paul Lim	Jujitsu	Men’s NeWaza U77KG	12 Dec
Silver	Brandon Ooi; Alden Ler; Evan Ching; Titus Ching; Daniel Koh; Tristan Loo	Canoeing	Men’s K4 200m	12 Dec
Silver	Ching Zhen Yu; Xu Duanyang; Nur Aufa; Liam Richard Arman	Basketball	Men’s 3x3	11 Dec
Silver	Chan Chun Ho	Swimming	Men’s 100m Breast	11 Dec
Silver	Teong Tzen Wei	Swimming	Men’s 50m Free	11 Dec
Silver	Quah Zheng Wen	Swimming	Men’s 50m Back	11 Dec
Silver	Asher Pua	Gymnastics	Men’s Pommel Horse	11 Dec
Silver	Aacus Ee	Jujitsu	Men’s Newaza U85KG	11 Dec
Silver	Quah Ting Wen; Quah Jing Wen; Gan Ching Hwee; Ashley Lim	Swimming	Women’s 4x100m Free	10 Dec
Silver	Quah Zheng Wen	Swimming	Men’s 100m Free	10 Dec
Silver	Stephenie Chen; Brandon Ooi; Alden Ler; Georgia Ng; Kayla Thesman; Evan Ching	Canoeing	Mixed K4 500m	10 Dec
Silver	Nicole Alethea Khaw	Taekwondo	Women’s Freestyle Poomsae	10 Dec
Bronze	Ser Lin Qian	Table tennis	Women’s Singles	19 Dec
Bronze	Gary Chow	Wrestling	Men’s Freestyle 86KG	19 Dec
Bronze	Alyssa Pok	Speed skating	Women’s 500M	19 Dec
Bronze	Charmaine Chang; Arianne Tay; Colleen Pee; Nur Irdina	Bowling	Women’s Team	19 Dec
Bronze	Mike Ong; Ryan Toh; Jomond Chia	Bowling	Men’s Team	19 Dec
Bronze	Herlene Yu	Triathlon	Women’s Individual	19 Dec
Bronze	Tin Jingyao; Goh Wei Ming; Siddharth Jagadesh	Chess	Men’s Rapid Double	19 Dec
Bronze	Goh Wei Ming; Jarred Neubronner; Jayden Wong; Joel Ngu; Tan Chong Hien Andrew	Chess	Men’s Makruk Rapid Team	19 Dec
Bronze	Women’s Team	Hockey (Indoor)	Women’s Team	18 Dec
Bronze	Women’s Team	Hockey (Field)	Women’s Team	18 Dec
Bronze	Men’s Team	Hockey (Indoor)	Men’s Team	18 Dec
Bronze	Jerome Clement Aw	Squash	Men’s Singles	18 Dec
Bronze	Max Lee	Diving	Men’s 3M Springboard	18 Dec
Bronze	Au Yeong Wai Yhann	Squash	Women’s Singles	18 Dec
Bronze	Men’s Team	Kabaddi	Men’s Three Stars	18 Dec
Bronze	Women’s Team	Ice hockey	Women’s Team	18 Dec
Bronze	Chloe Luai; Alyssa Pok; Brandon Pok; Ryo Ong Yik	Speed skating	Mixed Team Relay	18 Dec
Bronze	Women’s Team	Kabaddi	Women’s Three Stars	18 Dec
Bronze	Ahmad Arif; Nicholas Rachmadi; Louisa Marie Middleditch; Rachel Hew	Duathlon	Mixed Relay Team	18 Dec
Bronze	Men’s Team	Hockey (Field)	Men’s Team	18 Dec
Bronze	Arytom Lukasevits	Open Water Swimming	Men’s 10KM	18 Dec
Bronze	Men’s Team	Cricket	Men’s T10	17 Dec
Bronze	Caedan Jeyasellan Paul; Chiara Mei Corbi; Christie Paige Nair; Gladys Yong	Equestrian	Show Jumping Team	17 Dec
Bronze	Gabriel Yang Yi	Wrestling	Men’s Greco-Roman 87KG	17 Dec
Bronze	John Wong	Sailing	Men’s IQFoil U19	17 Dec
Bronze	Simon Lee Renjie	Fencing	Men’s Epee	17 Dec
Bronze	Adele Tan	Shooting	Women’s 50M Rifle 3 Positions	17 Dec
Bronze	Ser Lin Qian; Loy Ming Ying	Table tennis	Women’s Doubles	17 Dec
Bronze	Herlene Yu; Kathlyn Yeo; Lim Wan Ting	Triathlon	Women’s Relay Team	17 Dec
Bronze	Abdul Raaziq	Pencak silat	Men’s Tanding Class G	17 Dec
Bronze	Calvin Quek; Reuben Rainer Lee; Zubin Muncherji; Thiruben	Athletics	Men’s 4x400m Relay	16 Dec
Bronze	Jonathan Lim	Fencing	Men’s Foil	16 Dec
Bronze	Samuel Quek; Li Yuan Xin	Squash	Men’s Jumbo Doubles	16 Dec
Bronze	Ethan Chia; Ong Zhe Sim	Squash	Mixed Jumbo Doubles	16 Dec
Bronze	Danisha	Boxing	Women’s 48KG	16 Dec
Bronze	Caelan James Clark	Boxing	Men’s 60KG	16 Dec
Bronze	Ang Jin Yang	Boxing	Men’s 54KG	16 Dec
Bronze	Jomond Chia; Nu’man Syahmi	Bowling	Men’s Doubles	16 Dec
Bronze	Siti Mastura	Shooting	Women’s Trap	16 Dec
Bronze	Ashton Chia; Tin Jingyao; Siddharth Jagadeesh; Goh Wei Ming; Joel Ngu	Chess	Men’s ASEAN Rapid Chess Team	16 Dec
Bronze	Men’s Team	Floorball	Men’s Team	16 Dec
Bronze	Men’s Team	Kabaddi	Men’s Super 5 Team	16 Dec
Bronze	Women’s Team	Kabaddi	Women’s Super 5 Team	16 Dec
Bronze	Herlene Yu; Louisa Marie Middleditch; Lim Wan Ting	Aquathlon	Women’s Team	16 Dec
Bronze	Andrew Medina	Athletics	Men’s Long Jump	15 Dec
Bronze	Men’s Team	Handball	Men’s Team	15 Dec
Bronze	Women’s Team	Handball	Women’s Team	15 Dec
Bronze	Alexavier Koh	Kickboxing	Men’s Tatami Point Fighting 63KG	15 Dec
Bronze	Colleen Pee	Bowling	Women’s Singles	15 Dec
Bronze	Jeryl Khoo	Muaythai	Men’s 71KG	15 Dec
Bronze	Terrence Teo	Muaythai	Men’s 75KG	15 Dec
Bronze	Chan Jun Kai	Wushu	Men’s Taijijian & Taijiquan	15 Dec
Bronze	Le Yin Shuen	Wushu	Women’s Changquan/Jianshu/Qiangshu	15 Dec
Bronze	Kassandra Ong	Wushu	Women’s Nanquan/Nandao/Nangun	15 Dec
Bronze	Women’s Team	Rugby 7s	Women’s Team	14 Dec
Bronze	Luke Goh Wen Bin	Sport climbing	Men's boulder	14 Dec
Bronze	Chan Jun Hao	Swimming	Men’s 100m Breast	14 Dec
Bronze	Chan Keng Kwang; Ong Jia Jun	Billiards	Men’s Snooker Doubles	14 Dec
Bronze	Siti Khadijah	Wushu	Women’s Sanda 60KG	14 Dec
Bronze	Nia Zahedi	Sailing	Girl’s ILCA 4	14 Dec
Bronze	Nurin Insyirah	Pencak silat	Women’s Tunggal (Seni)	14 Dec
Bronze	A Priyadarshini; Anandarajan Sadhana; Anandarajan Sindini; Arthi Selvan; Ayyakkannu Abiraami; K. Suba Lakshmi; M Vishwalah Devi; Putri Siti Nur Farhani; Raghuram Mithra; Rethinasabapathi Indhusri Kousika; Samyuktha Pugalanthi; Sasmithaa Mano; Thanushri Ramakrishnan; Trisha Raja; Umapathy Sankar	Kabaddi	Women’s Standard Team	14 Dec
Bronze	Men’s Team	Cricket	Men’s T20	13 Dec
Bronze	Ryan Goh	Judo	Men’s Combat U90KG	13 Dec
Bronze	Teo Chee Hern	Judo	Men’s Combat U81KG	13 Dec
Bronze	Isaiah Tang	Karate	Men’s Kumite U75KG	13 Dec
Bronze	Anbu Navin N Annadurai; Brian Darrell Reyes; Kannan Gokul; Kannan Shainikilesh; Karunakaran Kishore; Mohamed Azad Fuad; Muhammad Aidil Asyraaf; Muthukumaran Rajakumar; Parthiv Murugesh; Raja Sri Raam; Rayan Zuhayr; S Rahoul Dev Shiv Ram; Vishnuvarthan Vishva Deva; Yathukulan Ahdhitthyan	Kabaddi	Men’s Standard Team	13 Dec
Bronze	Aacus Ee; Danish Faiz; Atiq Syazwani; Abigail Rish	Jujitsu	Mixed Team	13 Dec
Bronze	Martina Amos; Gan Xin Chen; Ho Xiu Yi	Shooting	Women’s 10m Air Rifle Team	13 Dec
Bronze	Russel Pang	Swimming	Men’s 1500m Free	12 Dec
Bronze	Gwenifer Mak; Ker Kim Huay; Neo Kwee Hueh; Tan Sooi Kim; Liu Hsu Sheng; Xie Lifen	Woodball	Women’s Team Fairway	12 Dec
Bronze	Chan Hock Hooi; Cheng Hua Ju; Len Meng Jin; Neo Hock Leng; Ng Yeow Gim; Tan Kok Kiong	Woodball	Men’s Team Fairway	12 Dec
Bronze	Zhen Yuxuan	Judo	Women’s Combat U70KG	12 Dec
Bronze	Quah Ting Wen	Swimming	Women’s 100m Free	12 Dec
Bronze	Charlene Chai; Audrey Chua	Billiards	Women’s 6-Red Snooker Team	12 Dec
Bronze	Martina Amos; Zaccheus Chong	Shooting	Mixed 10m Air Rifle Team	12 Dec
Bronze	Quah Zheng Wen; Jonathan Tan; Ardi Azman; Glen Lim	Swimming	Men’s 4x200m Free	11 Dec
Bronze	Maximillian Ang	Swimming	Men’s 100m Breast	11 Dec
Bronze	Gabriel Lee	Athletics	Men’s Triple Jump	11 Dec
Bronze	Colleen Hong	Gymnastics	Women’s Uneven Bars	11 Dec
Bronze	Alden Ler; Ng Georgia	Canoeing	Mixed K2 200m	11 Dec
Bronze	Keston Pang	Taekwondo	Men’s Kyorugi U54KG	11 Dec
Bronze	Kayleigh Lim	Jujitsu	Women’s Ne-Waza U48KG	11 Dec
Bronze	Charlene Chai; Audrey Chua	Billiards	Women’s Snooker Team	11 Dec
Bronze	Quah Zheng Wen	Swimming	Men’s 100m Back	10 Dec
Bronze	Quah Jing Wen	Swimming	Women’s 200m Fly	10 Dec
Bronze	Yeo Jia Min; Jaslyn Hooi; Jin Yujia; Megan Lee; Insyirah Khan; Li ZhengYang; Li ZhengHong; Andrea Tay	Badminton	Women’s Team	10 Dec
Bronze	Loh Kean Yew; Jason Teh; Joel Koh; Terry Hee; Ding Hanjin; Donovan Lee; Junsuke Kubo; Kriston Choo; Wesley Koh; Howin Wong	Badminton	Men’s Team	10 Dec
Bronze	Darren Yap	Taekwondo	Men’s Freestyle Poomsae	10 Dec
All sporting and medalist records are kept by SNOC

== Athletics ==
A record number of 39 track & field athletes will be fielded. More than half of them are National record holders.

Men

Athlete	Event	Heat		Final	
Athlete	Event	Time	Rank	Time	Rank
Marc Brian Louis	100m				
Tate Tan	100m				
Marc Brian Louis	200m				
Harry Curran	200m				
Reuben Rainer Lee	400m				
Subaraghav Hari	400m				
Thiruben Thana Rajan	800m				
Zubin Muncherji	800m				
Oliver Lim	1500m	—N/a			
Amir Rusyaidi Osman	1500m	—N/a			
Shaun Goh	5000m	—N/a			
Soh Rui Yong	10,000m	—N/a			
Shaun Goh	10,000m	—N/a			
Ang Chen Xiang	110mH				
Calvin Quek	400mH				
Marc Brian Louis; Tate Tan; Daryl Tan; Xander Ho; Yan Teo	4 × 100m Relay				
	4 × 400m Relay	—N/a			
Richard Heng	Marathon	—N/a			
Henry He Yong	Marathon	—N/a			
Low Jun Yu	Pole Vault	—N/a			
Kampton Kam	High Jump	—N/a			
Andrew Pak	High Jump	—N/a			
Feng Han Lin	Long Jump	—N/a			
Andrew Medina	Long Jump	—N/a			
Gabriel Lee	Triple Jump	—N/a			
Andrew Medina	Triple Jump	—N/a			
Eric Yee	Discus	—N/a			

Women

Athlete	Event	Heat		Final	
Athlete	Event	Time	Rank	Time	Rank
Shanti Pereira	100m				
Elizabeth-Ann Tan	100m				
Shanti Pereira	200m				
Elizabeth-Ann Tan	200m				
Vanessa Lee	3000m SC	—N/a			
Nicole Low	5000m	—N/a			
Vanessa Lee	5000m	—N/a			
Kerstin Ong	100mH				
Shanti Pereira; Elizabeth-Ann Tan; Shannon Tan; Laavinia Jaiganth; Sarah Poh	4 × 100m Relay				
Goh Shing Ling	Marathon	—N/a			
Amelia Goh	High Jump	—N/a			
Jade Chew	High Jump	—N/a			
Tia Rozario	Long Jump	—N/a			
Chloe Chee	Long Jump	—N/a			
Tia Rozario	Triple Jump	—N/a			

== Badminton ==
The Singapore Badminton Association (SBA) competed in both the team and individual events, with representation in every category — men’s singles, women’s singles, doubles, and mixed doubles. They fielded the following squads:

Badminton Team
Men's Team	Women's Team
Loh Kean Yew (Team, Singles); Jason Teh (Team, Singles); Terry Hee (Team, Mixed Doubles); Wesley Koh (Team, Doubles); Kubo Junsuke (Team, Doubles); Howin Wong (Team, Doubles); Donovan Wee (Team, Doubles); Kriston Choo (Team, Mixed Doubles); Joel Koh (Team); Ding Hanjin (Team)	Yeo Jia Min (Team, Singles); Jaslyn Hooi (Team, Singles); Jin Yujia (Team, Doubles, Mixed Doubles); Andrea Tay (Team, Doubles, Mixed Doubles); Li Zhenghong (Team, Doubles); Li Zhengyan (Team, Doubles); Insyirah Khan (Team); Megan Lee (Team)

Athlete	Event	Round of 16	Quarterfinal	Semifinal	Final
Athlete	Event	Opposition Score	Opposition Score	Opposition Score	Rank
Loh Kean Yew	Singles	Jewel Angelo Albo (PHI) W (21–17, 21–19)	Zaki Ubaidillah (INA) L (19–21, 19–21)	Did not advance	
Jason Teh	Singles	Justin Hoh (MAS) L (22-20, 21-15)	Did not advance		
Wesley Koh Junsuke Kubo	Doubles	Christian Bernardo (PHI) / Alvin Morada (PHI) W (21–10, 21–10)	Leo Rolly Carnando (INA) / Bagas Maulana (PHI) L (17–21, 19–21)	Did not advance	
Donovan Willard Wee Howin Wong	Doubles	Solomon Padiz Jr. (PHI) / Julius Villabrille (PHI) L (10–21, 10–21)	Did not advance		

	Event	Round of 16	Quarterfinal	Semifinal	Final	
	Event	Opposition Score	Opposition Score	Opposition Score	Opposition Score	Rank
Singapore (SGP)	Men’s Team	—N/a	Laos (LAO); W 3-0	Indonesia (INA); L 3-1	Did not advance	3rd place, bronze medalist(s)

=== Men's team ===
Singapore
3
Thammasat University Rangsit Campus
7 December 2025 15:00 UTC+7

Laos
0

			1	2	3
1	(Singapore) (Laos)	Loh Kean Yew; Xayyalath Souksavat	21; 8	21; 11
2	(Singapore) (Laos)	Jason Teh; Phonesack Sokthavy	21; 12	21; 15
3	(Singapore) (Laos)	Joel Koh; Vixunnalath Phichith	21; 11	21; 7
4	(Singapore) (Laos)	Wesley Koh / Junsuke Kubo; Namboun Luangamath / Phonesack Sokhavy				not played
5	(Singapore) (Laos)	Kittisak Namdash / Jia Hao Howin Wong; Phanthalang Outhaithani / Vixunnalath Phichith				not played

Indonesia
3
Thammasat University Rangsit Campus
8 December 2025 15:00 UTC+7

Singapore
1

			1	2	3
1	(Indonesia) (Singapore)	Alwi Farhan; Loh Kean Yew	15; 21	21; 14	8; 21
2	(Indonesia) (Singapore)	S K Gutama / M R P Isfahani; Wesley Koh / Junsuke Kubo	21; 18	18; 21	21; 10
3	(Indonesia) (Singapore)	Moh. Zaki Ubaidillah; Jason Teh	21; 2	21; 13
4	(Indonesia) (Singapore)	Leo Rolly Carnando / Bagas Maulana; Donovan Willard Wee / Howin Wong	21; 12	21; 19
5	(Indonesia) (Singapore)	Prahdiska Bagas Shujiwo; Ding Hanjin				not played

	Event	Round of 16	Quarterfinal	Semifinal	Final	
	Event	Opposition Score	Opposition Score	Opposition Score	Opposition Score	Rank
Singapore (SGP)	Women’s Team	—N/a	Philippines (PHI); W 3-0	Thailand (THA); L 3-0	Did not advance	3rd place, bronze medalist(s)

=== Women's team ===
Singapore
3
Thammasat University Rangsit Campus
7 December 2025 10:00 UTC+7

Philippines
0

			1	2	3
1	(Singapore) (Philippines)	Insyirah Khan; Mikhaela de Guzman	21; 15	21; 18
2	(Singapore) (Philippines)	Megan Lee; Ysabel Amora	19; 21	24; 22	21; 16
3	(Singapore) (Philippines)	Jaslyn Hooi; Christel Fuentespina	21; 10	21; 14
4	(Singapore) (Philippines)	Insyirah Khan / Megan Lee; Andrea Princess Hernandez / Mary Untal				not played
5	(Singapore) (Philippines)	Jaslyn Hooi / Jin Yujia; Eleanor Inlayo / Jeya Pinlac				not played

Thailand
3
Thammasat University Rangsit Campus
8 December 2025 10:00 UTC+7

Singapore
0

			1	2	3
1	(Thailand) (Singapore)	Pornpawee Chochuwong; Insyirah Khan	21; 14	21; 15
2	(Thailand) (Singapore)	Benyapa Aimsaard / Supissara Paewsampran; Jin Yujia / Li Zhengyan	21; 6	21; 10
3	(Thailand) (Singapore)	Ratchanok Intanon; Megan Lee	21; 8	21; 10
4	(Thailand) (Singapore)	Ornnicha Jongsathapornparn / Jhenicha Sudjaipraparat; Li Zhenghong / Andrea Jacqui Tay				not played
5	(Thailand) (Singapore)	Supanida Katethong; Jaslyn Hooi				not played

== Baseball/Softball ==
=== Baseball ===
Team	Event	Round-robin							Final / BM	
Team	Event	Opposition Score	Opposition Score	Opposition Score	Opposition Score	Opposition Score	Opposition Score	Rank	Opposition Score	Rank
Singapore	Baseball	Laos; W 13-1	Philippines; L 17-3	Vietnam; W 19-12	Thailand; L 6-4	Malaysia; W 14-7	Indonesia; L 15-4	4th	Indonesia; L 10-9	4th

=== Softball ===
Team	Event	Round-robin					Final / BM	
Team	Event	Opposition Score	Opposition Score	Opposition Score	Opposition Score	Rank	Opposition Score	Rank
Singapore	Women’s Team	Philippines; L 2-1	Malaysia; W 12-0	Indonesia; W 9-0	Thailand; W 10-3	2nd	Philippines; L 4-1	2nd place, silver medalist(s)

Team	Event	Round-robin				Final / BM	
Team	Event	Opposition Score	Opposition Score	Opposition Score	Rank	Opposition Score	Rank
Singapore	Men’s Team	Thailand; W 10-0	Malaysia; W 9-0	Philippines; W 7-3	1st	Philippines; L 3-0	2nd place, silver medalist(s)

== Basketball ==
=== 3x3 ===
Team	Event	Round-robin				Semi-finals	Final / BM	
Team	Event	Opposition Score	Opposition Score	Opposition Score	Rank	Opposition Score	Opposition Score	Rank
Singapore	Men’s Team	Myanmar; W 21-5	Thailand; L 18-13	Indonesia; W 20-18	2nd	Philippines; W 21-20	Thailand; L 21-18	2nd place, silver medalist(s)

Team	Event	Round-robin				Semi-finals	Final / BM	
Team	Event	Opposition Score	Opposition Score	Opposition Score	Rank	Opposition Score	Opposition Score	Rank
Singapore	Women’s Team	Laos; W 21-0	Thailand; L 19-12	Vietnam; L 21-16	3rd	Did Not Advance		

=== 5x5 ===
Team	Event	Group stage				Quarter finals	5th Placing	
Team	Event	Opposition Score	Opposition Score	Opposition Score	Rank	Opposition Score	Opposition Score	Rank
Singapore	Men’s Team	Thailand; L 84-37	Myanmar; W 91-60	Indonesia; L 87-48	3rd	Malaysia; L 71-69	Vietnam; L	6th

Team	Event	Group stage			Quarter finals	5th Placing	
Team	Event	Opposition Score	Opposition Score	Rank	Opposition Score	Opposition Score	Rank
Singapore	Women’s Team	Philippines; L 92-59	Malaysia; L 70-34	3rd	Indonesia; L 77-37	Vietnam; L	6th

== Cricket ==
=== T10 ===
Team	Event	Round-robin					Final / BM	
Team	Event	Opposition Score	Opposition Score	Opposition Score	Opposition Score	Rank	Opposition Score	Rank
Singapore	Men’s Team	Indonesia; W 78-61	Philippines; W 123-120	Thailand; L 91-85	Malaysia; L 74-73	3rd	Did not advance	3rd place, bronze medalist(s)

Team	Event	Group stage			Final / BM	
Team	Event	Opposition Score	Opposition Score	Rank	Opposition Score	Rank
Singapore	Women’s Team	Thailand; L 12/0 - 9/10	Indonesia; L 79/3 - 31/5	Did Not Advance		

=== T20 ===
Team	Event	Round-robin					Final / BM	
Team	Event	Opposition Score	Opposition Score	Opposition Score	Opposition Score	Rank	Opposition Score	Rank
Singapore	Men’s Team	Indonesia; W 155 - 151	Philippines; L 147/9 - 141/6	Thailand; W 156 - 152	Malaysia; L 111 - 110	3rd	Did not advance	3rd place, bronze medalist(s)

Team	Event	Group stage			Final / BM	
Team	Event	Opposition Score	Opposition Score	Rank	Opposition Score	Rank
Singapore	Women’s Team	Thailand; L 259-33	Myanmar; L 123-51	3rd	Did Not Advance	

== Fencing ==
=== Epee ===
Team	Event	Quarter-finals	Semi-finals	Final	
Team	Event	Opposition Score	Opposition Score	Opposition Score	Rank
Singapore (SGP); Simon Lee Renjie; Si To Jia Tong; Azfar Luqman Ong; Bron Sheum	Men’s Epee	Malaysia (MAS); W 45-26	Philippines (PHI); W 45-39	Vietnam (VIE); W 44-34	1st place, gold medalist(s)

Team	Event	Quarter-finals	Semi-finals	Final	
Team	Event	Opposition Score	Opposition Score	Opposition Score	Rank
Singapore (SGP); Kiria Tikanah; Elle Koh; Filzah Hidayah; Esther Tan	Women’s Epee	Bye	Philippines (PHI); W 45-40	Thailand (THA); W 45-36	1st place, gold medalist(s)

=== Foil ===
Team	Event	Quarter-finals	Semi-finals	Final	
Team	Event	Opposition Score	Opposition Score	Opposition Score	Rank
Singapore (SGP); Samuel Elijah Robson; Jonathan Lim; Julian Soh; Raphael Tan	Men’s Foil	Bye	Philippines (PHI); W 44-43	Malaysia (MAS); W 45-20	1st place, gold medalist(s)

Team	Event	Quarter-finals	Semi-finals	Final	
Team	Event	Opposition Score	Opposition Score	Opposition Score	Rank
Singapore (SGP); Amita Berthier; Maxine Wong; Cheung Kemei; Stephanie Lee	Women’s Foil	Bye	Vietnam (VIE); W 45-17	Philippines (PHI); W 45-31	1st place, gold medalist(s)

=== Sabre ===
Team	Event	Quarter-finals	Semi-finals	Final / BM	
Team	Event	Opposition Score	Opposition Score	Opposition Score	Rank
Singapore (SGP); Chan Phu Xien; Julius Tan; Maximilian Tan	Men’s Sabre	Thailand (THA); L 45-41	Did Not Advance		5th

Team	Event	Quarter-finals	Semi-finals	Final / BM	
Team	Event	Opposition Score	Opposition Score	Opposition Score	Rank
Singapore (SGP); Juliet Heng; Christine Tan; Jermaine Tan; Lim Jia En	Women’s Sabre	Bye	Vietnam (VIE); W 45-41	Thailand (THA); L 45-32	2nd place, silver medalist(s)

== Floorball ==
Team	Event	Round-robin					Final / BM	
Team	Event	Opposition Score	Opposition Score	Opposition Score	Opposition Score	Rank	Opposition Score	Rank
Singapore	Men’s Team	Thailand; L 9-5	Malaysia; W 14-3	Philippines; L 6-4	Laos; W 36-0	3rd	Did not advance	3rd place, bronze medalist(s)

Team	Event	Round-robin				Final / BM	
Team	Event	Opposition Score	Opposition Score	Opposition Score	Rank	Opposition Score	Rank
Singapore	Women’s Team	Thailand; D 2-2	Malaysia; W 9-1	Philippines; W 8-0	1st	Thailand; L 2-1	2nd place, silver medalist(s)

== Football ==
Summary

Key:

- A.E.T – After extra time.
- P – Match decided by penalty-shootout.

Team	Event	Group stage			Semifinal	Final / BM	
Team	Event	Opposition Score	Opposition Score	Rank	Opposition Score	Opposition Score	Rank
Singapore	Men's	Thailand; L 3-0	Timor-Leste; L 3-1	3rd	Did Not Advance		

Team	Event	Group stage			Semifinal	Final / BM	
Team	Event	Opposition Score	Opposition Score	Rank	Opposition Score	Opposition Score	Rank
Singapore	Women's	Thailand; L 2-0	Indonesia; L 3-1	3rd	Did Not Advance		

== Handball ==
Team	Event	Round-robin						Semi-finals	Final / BM	
Team	Event	Opposition Score	Opposition Score	Opposition Score	Opposition Score	Opposition Score	Rank	Opposition Score	Opposition Score	Rank
Singapore	Men’s Team	Indonesia; W 26-19	Vietnam; L 26-19	Philippines; W 24-23	Thailand; L 33-20	Malaysia; W 34-9	3rd	Vietnam; L 27-25	Did not advance	3rd place, bronze medalist(s)

Team	Event	Round-robin				Semi-finals	Final / BM	
Team	Event	Opposition Score	Opposition Score	Opposition Score	Rank	Opposition Score	Opposition Score	Rank
Singapore	Women’s Team	Thailand; L 31-17	Philippines; W 26-14	Vietnam; L 29-20	3rd	Thailand; L 29-23	Did not advance	3rd place, bronze medalist(s)

== Hockey ==
=== Indoor hockey ===
Team	Event	Round-robin					Semi-finals	Final / BM	
Team	Event	Opposition Score	Opposition Score	Opposition Score	Opposition Score	Rank	Opposition Score	Opposition Score	Rank
Singapore	Men’s Team	Indonesia; L 10-0	Thailand; L 5-3	Philippines; W 8-1	Malaysia; L 8-0	4th	Malaysia; L 6-0	Did not advance	3rd place, bronze medalist(s)

Team	Event	Round-robin					Semi-finals	Final / BM	
Team	Event	Opposition Score	Opposition Score	Opposition Score	Opposition Score	Rank	Opposition Score	Opposition Score	Rank
Singapore	Women’s Team	Malaysia; L 10-0	Indonesia; L 6-1	Thailand; L 10-0	Philippines; W 2-0	4th	Thailand; L 6-0	Did not advance	3rd place, bronze medalist(s)

=== Field hockey ===
Team	Event	Round-robin					Semi-finals	Final / BM	
Team	Event	Opposition Score	Opposition Score	Opposition Score	Opposition Score	Rank	Opposition Score	Opposition Score	Rank
Singapore	Men’s Team	Myanmar; W 4-0	Thailand; L 1-0	Malaysia; L 6-0	Indonesia; D 0-0	3rd	Malaysia; L 12-2	Did not advance	3rd place, bronze medalist(s)

Team	Event	Round-robin				Semi-finals	Final / BM	
Team	Event	Opposition Score	Opposition Score	Opposition Score	Rank	Opposition Score	Opposition Score	Rank
Singapore	Women’s Team	Malaysia; L 3-0	Thailand; L 3-0	Indonesia; L 4-0	4th	Malaysia; L 9-0	Did not advance	3rd place, bronze medalist(s)

== Ice hockey ==
Team	Event	Round-robin					Semi-finals	Final / BM	
Team	Event	Opposition Score	Opposition Score	Opposition Score	Opposition Score	Rank	Opposition Score	Opposition Score	Rank
Singapore	Men’s Team	Malaysia; W 5-4	Indonesia; L 6-1	Philippines; L 7-4	Thailand; L 7-3	4th	Indonesia; L 8-3	Philippines; L 5-3	4th

Team	Event	Round-robin				Semi-finals	Final / BM	
Team	Event	Opposition Score	Opposition Score	Opposition Score	Rank	Opposition Score	Opposition Score	Rank
Singapore	Women’s Team	Philippines; L 3-1	Malaysia; W 4-1	Thailand; L 9-0	3rd	Philippines; L 6-2	Malaysia; W 2-0	3rd place, bronze medalist(s)

== Netball ==
Team	Event	Round-robin					Final	
Team	Event	Opposition Score	Opposition Score	Opposition Score	Opposition Score	Rank	Opposition Score	Rank
Singapore	Netball	Philippines; W 70-21	Thailand; W 69-47	Malaysia; W 58-56	Brunei; W 89-23	1st	Malaysia; L	2nd place, silver medalist(s)

== Rugby sevens ==
Team	Event	Round-robin					Final / BM	
Team	Event	Opposition Score	Opposition Score	Opposition Score	Opposition Score	Rank	Opposition Score	Rank
Singapore	Men’s Team	Laos; W 34-0	Philippines; W 10-7	Malaysia; W 19-14	Thailand; L 22-0	2nd	Thailand; L 10-5	2nd place, silver medalist(s)

Team	Event	Round-robin					Final / BM	
Team	Event	Opposition Score	Opposition Score	Opposition Score	Opposition Score	Rank	Opposition Score	Rank
Singapore	Women’s Team	Malaysia; L 21-19	Thailand; L 36-0	Indonesia; W 12-5	Philippines; L 19-10	3rd	Philippines; W 33-5	3rd place, bronze medalist(s)

== Table tennis ==
A mix team of debutants and season campaigners will be at the Games.

Table Tennis Team
Men's Team	Women's Team
Clarence Chew (Team, Doubles, XD); Isaac Quek (Team, Singles, Doubles); Koen Pang (Team, Doubles, XD); Josh Chua (Team, Doubles); Ellsworth Le (Team, Singles)	Zeng Jian (Team, Singles, XD); Ser Lin Qian (Team, Singles, Doubles); Tan Zhao Yun (Team, Doubles); Chloe Lai (Team, Doubles); Loy Ming Ying (Team, Doubles, XD)

Team	Event	Group stage				Semi-finals	Final	
Team	Event	Opposition Score	Opposition Score	Opposition Score	Rank	Opposition Score	Opposition Score	Rank
Singapore (SGP)	Men’s Team	Indonesia (INA); W 3-1	Vietnam (VIE); W 3-1	Myanmar (MYA); W 3-0	1st	Philippines (PHI); W 3-1	Vietnam (VIE); W 3-2	1st place, gold medalist(s)

12 December	Singapore	3–1	Indonesia

Koen Pang	2–3	Muhammad Nauful	8–11, 9–11, 11–6, 11–5, 7-11
Clarence Chew	3–2	Muhammad Bimi	11–8, 11–9, 10–12, 7–11, 11-9
Izaac Quek	3–1	Muhammad Zahru	11–9, 7–11, 11-9, 11-7
Koen Pang	3–1	Muhammad Bimi	12–10, 11–7, 5–11, 11-4

13 December	Singapore	3–1	Vietnam

Koen Pang	3–1	Đinh Anh Hoàng	11–5, 11-7, 5-11, 11-5
Izaac Quek	3–0	Nguyễn Duc Tuan	11-9, 11–6, 11-5,
Clarence Chew	1–3	Nguyễn Anh Tú	13–11, 7–11, 11-13, 10-12
Izaac Quek	3–0	Đinh Anh Hoàng	11-5, 14-12, 11-8

13 December	Singapore	3–0	Myanmar

Josh Chua	3–0	Kyi Myint	11-5, 11-8, 11-9
Ellsworth Lee	3–0	Khant Min Ko	12-10, 11-8, 11-9
Koen Pang	3–0	Aung Myint Myat	11-7, 11-9, 11-7

14 December	Singapore	3–1	Philippines

Izaac Quek	3–2	Jann Mari Nayre	12-10, 11-13, 10-12, 11-5, 11-3
Koen Pang	2–3	John Russell Misal	9-11, 12-10, 8-11, 11-8, 10-12
Josh Chua	3–0	Aaron Edouard Raymond	11-3, 11-5, 11-8
Izaac Quek	3–0	-2 John Russell Misal	11-9, 11-5, 11-5

14 December	Singapore	3–2	Vietnam

Team	Event	Group Stage			Semi-finals	Final	
Team	Event	Opposition Score	Opposition Score	Rank	Opposition Score	Opposition Score	Rank
Singapore (SGP)	Women’s Team	Malaysia (MAS); W 3-0	Indonesia (INA); W 3-0	1st	Philippines (PHI); W 3-0	Thailand (THA); L 3-2	2nd place, silver medalist(s)

13 December	Singapore	3–0	Malaysia

Zeng Jian	3–2	Alice Chang	11-3, 11-6, 9-11, 11-13, 11-9
Ser Lin Qian	3–2	Karen Lyne	4-11, 11-5, 5-11, 11-9, 11-9
Loy Ming Ying	3–1	Tee Ai Xin	11-9, 6-11, 11-7, 11-8

13 December	Singapore	3–0	Indonesia

Ser Lin Qian	3–0	Siti Aminah	11-6, 12-10, 11-6
Zeng Jian	3–0	Anastasya Fabian	11-4, 11-7, 11-5
Tan Zhao Yun	3–0	Rina Sintya	11-9, 11-8, 12-10

14 December	Singapore	3–0	Philippines

Zeng Jian	3–0	Angelou Joyce Laude	11-6, 11-8, 11-6
Ser Lin Qian	3–2	Kheith Rhynne Cruz	10-12, 9-11, 11-5, 11-6, 11-9
Tan Zhao Yun	3–0	Fadol Rose Jean	11-7, 11-9, 11-6

14 December	Singapore	2–3	Thailand

== Triathlon ==
Triathlon Singapore names a record team of 18 athlete for the SEA Games; with 8 of them making their debuts. Athletes will be fielded in all disciplines - Triathlon, Duathlon and Aquathlon.

Triathlon Team
Men's Team	Women's Team
Ahmad Arif; Luke Chua; Bryce Chong; Nicholas Rachmadi; Samir Varma; Ben Khoo; Lim Cheng Yu; Reyes Loh; Tey Yi Jun	Herlene Yu; Kathlyn Yeo; Louisa Middleditch; Lim Wan Ting; Regine Goh; Janel Susastra; Jemma Hadden; Ng Xuan Jie; Rachel Hew

== Volleyball ==
Team	Event	Group stage				5th placing	
Team	Event	Opposition Score	Opposition Score	Opposition Score	Rank	Opposition Score	Rank
Singapore	Men’s Team	Thailand; L 3-1	Vietnam; L 3-0	Laos; W 3-1	3rd	Myanmar; L 3-2	6th

Team	Event	Group stage			Playoff	5th Placing	
Team	Event	Opposition Score	Opposition Score	Rank	Opposition Score	Opposition Score	Rank
Singapore	Women’s Team	Thailand; L 3-0	Philippines; L 3-0	3rd	Myanmar; W 3-0	Malaysia; W 3-1	5th

== Water polo ==
Team	Event	Round-robin				
Team	Event	Opposition Score	Opposition Score	Opposition Score	Opposition Score	Rank
Singapore	Men’s Team	Malaysia; W 23-8	Thailand; W 14-13	Philippines; W 33-6	Indonesia; W 19-16	1st place, gold medalist(s)

Team	Event	Round-robin				
Team	Event	Opposition Score	Opposition Score	Opposition Score	Opposition Score	Rank
Singapore	Women’s Team	Philippines; W 35-6	Malaysia; W 25-4	Indonesia; W 20-5	Thailand; L 11-8	2nd place, silver medalist(s)
