= Julia Yeo =

Singaporean swimmer (born 2010)

Julia Yeo Shu Ning
Personal information
- Born: 27 December 2010 (age 15) Singapore

Sport
- Sport: Swimming
- Strokes: Backstroke
- College team: Singapore Sports School
Medal record
Women's swimming
Representing Singapore
Event	1st	2nd	3rd
SEA Games	1	0	0
Total	1	0	0
SEA Games
Gold medal – first place	2025 Thailand	4×100 m medley

Julia Yeo Shu Ning (born 27 December 2010) is a Singaporean swimmer who specialises in backstroke. She is also the national record holder in the women's 200m backstroke event.

== Education ==
Julia is currently studying at the Singapore Sports School.

== Swimming career ==
Julia made her debut at the 2025 SEA Games aged 14. Despite finishing fourth at the women's 200m backstroke event, Julia broke the national record with a time of 2:16.51. This meant that Julia broke Tao Li's record since 2009. Due to a shoulder injury sustained by Levenia Sim during the warmup, Julia was named in the backstroke leg of the women's 4x100m medley relay team just 20 minutes before the final. The team managed to clinch the gold medal.
