= Martina Ayu Pratiwi =

Indonesian triathlete (born 2004)

Personal information
- Born: 2004 (age 21–22) Magetan, East Java, Indonesia

Sport
- Country: Indonesia
Medal record
Representing Indonesia
Women's triathlon
SEA Games
| Gold medal – first place | 2025 Thailand | Individual |
| Silver medal – second place | 2025 Thailand | Team relay |
| Silver medal – second place | 2025 Thailand | Mixed team relay |
Women's duathlon
SEA Games
| Gold medal – first place | 2025 Thailand | Team relay |
| Gold medal – first place | 2025 Thailand | Mixed team relay |
Women's aquathlon
SEA Games
| Gold medal – first place | 2025 Thailand | Team relay |
| Gold medal – first place | 2025 Thailand | Mixed team relay |

Martina Ayu Pratiwi (born 2004) is an Indonesian triathlete. She won multiple medals at the SEA Games.

== Education ==
Martina attended State University of Surabaya.

== Triathlon career ==
Martina won first place in the elite event at the 2025 Asia Triathlon Cup in Chennai, India. She also won a bronze medal at the 2025 Asia Triathlon Cup in Gamagori, Japan, in September 2025. At the 2025 SEA Games, she delivered an outstanding performance, winning five gold and two silver medals to become the most successful Indonesian athlete of the Games.
