= 2026 in Philippine sports =

The following is a list of notable events and developments related to Philippine sports in 2026.

== Events ==
=== Archery ===
- April 30 – May 3 – The Philippine delegation wins one gold and two bronze medals at the Asia Barebow Championships held in Shah Alam, Malaysia.
- July 3–5 – The Philippine delegation wins 13 gold, 10 silver, and 7 bronze medals at the Singapore Youth Archery Championships held at Bukit Gombak Stadium in Singapore.

=== Athletics ===
- January 24 – EJ Obiena wins the bronze medal at the 6th ISTAF Indoor Düsseldorf held in Düsseldorf, Germany after clearing 5.65 m (18.5 ft).
- January 29 – EJ Obiena wins the gold medal at the International Springer-Meeting held in Cottbus, Germany after clearing 5.77 m (18.9 ft).
- February 7 – EJ Obiena wins the gold medal at the 2026 Asian Indoor Athletics Championships held in Tianjin, China after clearing 5.70 m (18.7 ft).
- February 8 – EJ Obiena wins the bronze medal at the Indoor Meeting Karlsruhe held in Karlsruhe, Germany after clearing 5.70 m (18.7 ft).
- March 6 – EJ Obiena wins the gold medal at the ISTAF Indoor held in Berlin, Germany after clearing 5.78 m (19.0 ft).
- April 15–17 – The Philippine delegation wins one gold and three bronze medals at the Singapore Open Track & Field Championships 2026 in Singapore.
- May 7 – Leonard Grospe sets a new national record for men's high jump at NCAA Season 101 after clearing 2.22 m (7 ft 3 in).
- May 28–31 – The Philippine delegation wins one silver, and one bronze medals at the 2026 Asian U20 Athletics Championships held in Hong Kong, China.
- June 13 – The inaugural Galaxy Manila Marathon is held along the 42 km (26 mi) EDSA in Metro Manila. Allan Arbois Jr. and Jewel de Luna emerge as winners in the men's and women's divisions.
- June 15 – EJ Obiena wins the silver medal at the Eurowings Flight Circus held in Düsseldorf, Germany after clearing 5.74 m (18.8 ft).
- June 28 – EJ Obiena wins the gold medal at the Czeslaw Cybulski Memorial held in Poznań, Poland after clearing 5.72 m (18.8 ft).
- July 1 – EJ Obiena wins the gold medal at the Raiffeisen Austria Open held in Eisenstadt, Austria after clearing 5.74 m (18.8 ft).
- July 9–12 – The Philippine delegation wins two silver and one bronze medal at the 2026 Asian U23 Athletics Championships held in Ordos City, China.
- July 17 – EJ Obiena wins the silver medal at the World Athletics Continental Tour in Madrid, Spain after clearing 5.85 m (19.2 ft).
- August 1 – EJ Obiena wins the gold medal at the Halberstädter Höhenflug - 1. Internationales Stabhochsprung-Meeting auf dem Domplatz in Germany after clearing 5.76 m (18.9 ft).
- August 6 – EJ Obiena wins the gold medal at the Stabhochsprung Meeting in Jockgrim, Germany after clearing 5.83 m (19.1 ft).
- August 17 – EJ Obiena wins the gold medal at the Golden Sand 2026 in Międzyzdroje, Poland after clearing 5.91 m (19.4 ft).
- August 30 – EJ Obiena wins the gold medal at the ISTAF Berlin in Germany after clearing 5.82 m (19.1 ft).
- September 29 – EJ Obiena wins the gold medal in men’s pole vault at the 2026 Asian Games in Nagoya, Japan, after clearing 5.91 m (19.4 ft).
- November 10 – Naomi Cesar wins the silver medal at the women's 800 meters event at the 2026 Summer Youth Olympics in Dakar, Senegal after clocking in 2 minutes and 9.34 seconds.
- November 11 – Pi Durden Wangkay wins the bronze medal at the men's 200 meters event at the 2026 Summer Youth Olympics in Dakar, Senegal after clocking in 21.36 seconds.

=== Badminton ===
- February 8 – Clarence Villaflor wins the bronze medal at the Azerbaijan International held in Baku, Azerbaijan after defeating Minoru Koga in three sets (21–19, 13–21, 21–18).

=== Baseball ===
- May 5 – The Philippines women's national baseball team qualifies for their first-ever Women's Baseball World Cup after receiving a wild card from the World Baseball Softball Confederation for the 2027 Women's Baseball World Cup.

=== Basketball ===
- February 1 – The San Miguel Beermen win the 2025–26 PBA Philippine Cup after defeating TNT Tropang 5G 4–2 in the best-of-seven game series.
- March 1 – The Pilipinas Aguilas women's 3x3 team win the 3x3 Basketball Thailand International League 2026 held in Bangkok, Thailand after defeating Singapore 14–12 in the final tournament.
- March 12–18 – The Philippines women's national team participate at the 2026 FIBA Women's Basketball World Cup Qualifying Tournaments held in Villeurbanne, France, with a 1–4 win-loss record.
- April 1–5 – The Philippines women's national team wins the silver medal at the 2026 FIBA 3x3 Asia Cup held in Singapore after losing to Australia 10–21 in the final.
- April 12 – The Philippines women's national team qualifies for the 2026 FIBA 3x3 World Cup after defeating Singapore 21–10 in the classification playoff.
- May 18 – Senegal-born player Malick Diouf and American-born women's player Elizabeth Jeanette Means obtain Filipino citizenship after Republic Acts No. 12318 and 12319 granting them their respective naturalized status lapse into law.
- May 31 – The UST Growling Tigers win the 2026 National Student Athletes Championship after defeating NU Bulldogs 95–84 in the final tournament.
- June 1–7 – The Philippines women's national team participates at the 2026 FIBA 3x3 World Cup held in Warsaw, Poland.
- June 13 (CDT) – Jordan Clarkson becomes the first Filipino to play for an NBA champion after his team, the New York Knicks, won the 2026 edition.
- June 17 – The Barangay Ginebra San Miguel win the 2026 PBA Commissioner's Cup after defeating TNT Tropang 5G in a do-or-die seven-game series.
- July 15 – Akari Sparks Rizal wins the 2026 WMPBL finals after defeating Batangas-New Zealand Bluefire 2–1 in a best-of-three game series.
- July 23 – The JRU Heavy Bombers win the 2026 Filoil EcoOil Preseason Cup after defeating San Beda Red Lions 2–0 in a best-of-three game series.
- July 30:
  - The Maharlika Pilipinas Basketball League (MPBL) suspends the Bacolod Masskara for the rest of the 2026 season following allegations of game manipulation during a July 28 game against the Bulacan Kuyas. It also issues a permanent ban on Bacolod Masskara players and coaches involved in the incident.
  - The Philippines men's national under-17 team wins the bronze medal at the B.League U16 Challenge Cup after defeating Rizing Zephyr Fukuoka 78–72 in a bronze medal game.
- August 7 – The University Athletic Association of the Philippines Board imposes a perpetual ban on basketball coach Tab Baldwin from all UAAP-related events and competitions following its investigation into the deaths of Ateneo Blue Eagles players Rene Baterbonia and Divine Adili in a team-building activity in on June 8.
- August 19 – The MPBL signs a partnership with the East Asia Super League for the Philippines, with Abra Weavers, who won the 2025 season, as a representative.
- August 31 – American-born player Bennie Boatwright obtains Filipino citizenship after Republic Act No. 12323, granting him respective naturalized status, lapses into law.
- September 9–10 – The B.League Manila Games 2026 is held at the SM Mall of Asia Arena.
- October 27 – The Samahang Basketbol ng Pilipinas unveils Gilas Hiraya as the new moniker for the Philippines women's national team.

=== Bowling ===
- November 16 – Grace Gella and Krizziah Tabora-Macatula win the bronze medal in the women's doubles category at the 28th Asian Tenpin Bowling Championships in Doha, Qatar, after tallying 2,717 points.

=== Boxing ===
- February 7 – Gabriel Santisima wins the WBO Asia-Pacific super bantamweight title after defeating Subaru Murata via unanimous decision held at Korakuen Hall in Tokyo, Japan.
- March 15 – Nonito Donaire loses the WBA bantamweight eliminator after being knocked out by Riku Masuda in the eighth round in Yokohama, Japan.
- April 4 – Pedro Taduran retains the IBF minimumweight title after defeating Gustavo Perez Alvarez via technical knockout on the seventh round held at Pechanga Resort Casino in Temecula, California, United States.
- April 8 – John Wayne Vicera wins the bronze medal after defeating Iwai Daichi at the men's 50-kg category of the Asian Boxing Elite Championships held in Ulaanbaatar, Mongolia.
- April 30 – The 3rd Pacquiao-Elorde Awards are held at Okada Manila in Parañaque, with Melvin Jerusalem and Pedro Taduran named as Boxers of the Year.
- May 15–18 – The Philippine delegation wins two gold and one bronze medals at the Belgrade Winner Elite Tournament held in Belgrade, Serbia.
- May 17 – Melvin Jerusalem loses the WBC minimumweight title by Siyakholwa Kuse via unanimous decision held in Johannesburg, South Africa.
- May 25 – The Philippine delegation wins two gold medals at the Eindhoven Box Cup held in Eindhoven, Netherlands.
- June 17–21 – The Philippine delegation wins one gold and one bronze medals at the Grand Prix Ústí nad Labem 2026 held in Ústí nad Labem, Czech Republic.
- July 19 – Charly Suarez wins the WBO International super featherweight title after defeating Manuel Ávila via knockout in the first round.
- November 1 – Carl Jammes Martin wins the WBC silver featherweight title after defeating David Picasso via split decision held in Riyadh, Saudi Arabia.
- November 5–11 – The Philippine delegation wins one silver and two bronze medals at the 2026 China International Boxing Open held in Zunyi, China.
- November 8 – Pedro Taduran retains the IBF minimumweight title after defeating Brandon Moreno via unanimous decision held at Albuquerque Convention Center in Albuquerque, New Mexico, United States.

=== Brazilian jiu-jitsu ===
- August 6–9 – The Philippine delegation wins two gold, two silver, and six bronze medals at the JJIF World Championships held in Abu Dhabi, United Arab Emirates.

=== Chess ===
- March 2 – FIDE Master Megan Paragua wins the 2026 New York State High School Chess Championship held in Saratoga Springs, New York, United States.

=== Cue sports ===
- January 6 – AJ Manas finishes runner-up at the 2026 Chinese-Taipei Professional Billiards Association Pro Tour after losing to Ko Pin-yi 12–13 in the final tournament.
- January 21–23 – The inaugural WNT Legends competition is held at the Gateway 2 mall in Quezon City.
- January 31 – Carlo Biado wins the Asian 10-Ball Pool Championships held in Jakarta, Indonesia after defeating Robbie Capito 11–7 in the final tournament.
- February 4 – Alexis Ferrer wins the WWW Billiard 9-Ball Championship held in Jakarta, Indonesia after defeating Bachrain Rauf 9–5 in the final tournament.
- February 18 – Chezka Centeno finishes runner-up at the WPBA Classic Players Championship held in Lauderhill, Florida, United States after losing to Chou Chieh-yu 3–10 in the final tournament.
- February 28 – The Philippine team wins the mixed team category at the 2026 WPA World Ten-ball Championship held in Las Vegas, Nevada, United States, after defeating Poland 3–2 in the final tournament.
- March 14 – Carlo Biado wins the US Open 1-Pocket Championships after defeating Roland Garcia 5–1 in an all-Filipino final tournament.
- March 16 – Rubilen Amit finishes runner-up at the Raxx Mezz Olhausen Invitational held in West Hempstead, New York, United States after losing to Margaret Fefilova-Styer 1–8 in the final tournament.
- April 11 – Rhaki Roj Constantino wins the 2026 Asian HeyBall Women's Championship held in Selangor, Malaysia, after defeating Amee Kamani of India 6–3 in the final tournament.
- May 18 – Jeffrey Ignacio wins the 2026 World Nineball Tour held in Kuala Lumpur, Malaysia after defeating Sean Mark Malayan 13–1 in the final tournament.
- May 20 – Francisco Bustamante wins the Buffalo’s Pro Classic 1 Ball One Pocket Division held in Jefferson, Louisiana, United States after defeating Evan Lunda 4–0 in the final tournament.
- June 4 – The Negros Occidental Pillars win the 2025–26 SBA season after defeating the Manila MSW Mavericks 3–1 in a best-of-five game series.
- July 5 – Carlo Biado wins the 2026 International Indonesia 10-Ball Open held in Jakarta, Indonesia after defeating Paolo Gallito 10–9 in an all-Filipino final tournament.
- July 27 – Chezka Centeno wins the WPA Women’s World Eight-Ball Championship held in Green Bay, Wisconsin, United States after defeating Kelly Fisher 9–6 in the final tournament.
- September 21 – Anton Raga wins the 2026 Japan Men's Open held in Tokyo, Japan after defeating Antonio Lining 8–3 in the all-Filipino final tournament.
- October 5 – AJ Manas and Carlo Biado finish as runner-ups at the WPA World Ten-ball Doubles Championship held in Bali, Indonesia after losing to Francisco Sánchez Ruiz and David Alcaide 3–2 in the final.
- October 15–18 – The third edition of the Reyes Cup is held at Makati Coliseum in Makati. It concludes with Team Rest of the World win against Team Asia 11–4.
- October 24 – Johann Chua wins the 2026 Philippines Open after defeating Anton Raga 11–9 in the all-Filipino final.
- October 30 – AJ Manas finishes runner-up at the 2026 Qatar World Cup 10-ball in Doha, Qatar after losing to Joshua Filler 6–13 in the final.

=== Cycling ===
- February 7 – Mark Galedo wins the silver medal at the men's masters 40–44 age category of individual time trial (ITT) at the Asian Cycling Confederation Road Championships held in Phitsanulok, Thailand.
- March 25–31 – The 2026 Asian Track Cycling Championships is held at Tagaytay City Velodrome in Tagaytay.
- April 29 – May 13 – The Tour of Luzon is held beginning in Tagaytay, and finishing in Baguio.

=== Disc golf ===
- January 11 – Khevin Yu wins the mixed amateur category at the 2026 Asia Disc Golf Open – PDGA Asia Tour held in Kaohsiung, Taiwan after tallying 206 points.

=== Figure skating ===
- May 21 – Skye Patenia wins the bronze medal at the Oceania International Figure Skating Competition held in Auckland, New Zealand.

=== Floorball ===
- January 13–19 – The Philippines men's national team finishes fourth place at the 2026 Asia-Pacific Floorball Championship held in Wellington, New Zealand. The team, however, qualifies for the 2026 Men's World Floorball Championships in Finland.

=== Football ===
- March 1–21 – The Philippines women's national team participates at the 2026 AFC Women's Asian Cup in Australia. The team qualifies for the 2027 FIFA Women's World Cup in Brazil after defeating Uzbekistan 2–0 in the play-in tournament.
- May 1–17 – The Philippines women's national team participate at the 2026 AFC U-17 Women's Asian Cup in China.
- October 24–30 – The Philippines men's under-15 national team participate at the 2026 FIFA U-15 World Cup & Festival in Azerbaijan.

=== Gymnastics ===
- March 14 – Eldrew Yulo wins the gold medal in floor exercise at the 2026 FIG Artistic Gymnastics World Cup series in Antalya, Turkey after obtaining 14.100 points.
- April 5 – Eldrew Yulo wins the bronze medal in floor exercise at the 2026 FIG Artistic Gymnastics World Cup series in Cairo, Egypt after obtaining 14.000 points.
- April 6 – Eldrew Yulo wins the bronze medal in horizontal bar at the 2026 FIG Artistic Gymnastics World Cup series in Cairo, Egypt after obtaining 13.733 points.
- June 18–21 – Carlos Yulo and Eldrew Yulo win the gold and bronze medals in floor exercise at the 2026 Asian Men's Artistic Gymnastics Championships in Zunyi, China, after obtaining 14.700 and 14.300 points, respectively.
- August 4–7 – The 2026 Aerobic Gymnastics Asian Championships is held at Tagaytay City Velodrome in Tagaytay.
- September 24 – Carlos Yulo wins the gold medal in men's floor exercise at the 2026 Asian Games in Nagoya, Japan, after obtaining 14.666 points.
- September 25:
  - Carlos Yulo wins the gold medal in men's vault at the 2026 Asian Games in Nagoya, Japan, after obtaining 14.599 points.
  - Eldrew Yulo wins the bronze medal in men's horizontal bar at the 2026 Asian Games in Nagoya, Japan, after obtaining 13.666 points.

=== Handball ===
- June 23–28 – The Philippines women's national team participate in the 2026 Women's Beach Handball World Championships in Zagreb, Croatia.
- October 31 – The Philippines men's and women's national teams win bronze and silver medals at the IHF Nations Trophy – Asia Zone 1B held in Chonburi, Thailand.

=== Ice hockey ===
- February 28 – March 6 – The Philippines women's national team participates at the 2026 IIHF Women's World Championship Division III in Estonia.

=== Karate ===
- May 14–17 – The 2026 WKF Karate One–Youth League is held at SM Mall of Asia Arena in Pasay.

=== Lacrosse ===
- January 6–11 – The Philippines men's national team wins the silver medal at the 2026 Asia-Pacific Men's Lacrosse Championship held in New Zealand after losing to Australia 3–13 in the final tournament. The team, however, qualifies for the 2027 World Lacrosse Men's Championship.
- July 24 – August 2 – The Philippines women's national team participates at the 2026 World Lacrosse Women's Championship in Japan.

=== Mixed martial arts ===
- May 22–24 – The Philippine delegation wins two gold and three bronze medals at the 4th Asian MMA Championships held in Tashkent, Uzbekistan.
- June 23 – Denice Zamboanga relinquishes her ONE women's atomweight championship citing maternity leave.

=== Motorsport ===
- February 1 – A participant at the Boss Ironman Challenge Mindanao Cup 2026 dies in a traffic collision in Kibawe, Bukidnon.

=== Muay Thai ===
- June 16–22 – The Philippine delegation wins eleven gold, three silver, and five bronze medals at the IFMA Muaythai World School Championships held in Kuala Lumpur, Malaysia.

=== Rugby ===
- July 18 – The Philippines national team wins the Unions Cup held in Nonthaburi, Thailand after defeating Malaysia 39–18 in the final.

=== Sambo ===
- June 23–28 – The 2026 Asia-Oceania Sambo Championship is held at the Ninoy Aquino Stadium in Manila.

=== Skateboarding ===
- January 18 – Mazel Paris Alegado wins the women's park category at the DC Concert Line Pro Series held in Buenos Aires, Argentina.
- July 6 – Mazel Paris Alegado wins two gold medals at the Mystic Sk8 Cup held in Prague, Czech Republic.

=== Softball ===
- July 15–19 – The Philippines women's national team finishes fifth place at the 2026 Women's Softball World Cup held in Lima, Peru after defeating host team Peru 13–0 in fifth place playoff.

=== Soft tennis ===
- June 17–21 – The Philippine national team wins the gold medal at the NH Bank Korea Cup International Soft Tennis Tournament held in Incheon, South Korea.

=== Speed skating ===
- August 17–20 – The Philippine delegation wins two gold, one silver, and one bronze medal at the 2026 Asian Open Short Track Speed Skating Trophy held in Dehradun, India.

=== Speedcubing ===
- May 28 – Crimson Arradaza sets a new world record for the fastest 3x3x3 Rubik's Cube solved one-handed in a single solve of 5.335 seconds, held at Philippine National Speed Cubing Open in Tagaytay, beating the previous record by 5.66 seconds in a single solve set by Dhruva Sai Meruva of Switzerland.

=== Surfing ===
- August 9 – Jay-R Esquivel wins the Oceanside Longboard Surfing Club (OLSC) King of the Pier title at the at the 41st OLSC Contest and Beach Festival held in Oceanside, California, United States.
- October 31 – November 10 – The WSL Championship Tour is held in Siargao.

=== Swimming ===
- May 29–31 – The Philippine delegation win one gold, and two bronze medals at the Para Swimming World Series held in Fuji, Shizuoka, Japan.

=== Table tennis ===
- April 14–19 – The Philippine delegation finishes three bronze medals at the 2026 South East Asian Youth Table Tennis Championships held in Singapore.

=== Taekwondo ===
- May 19–20 – The Philippine delegation wins two silver and nine bronze medals at the 9th Asian Taekwondo Poomsae Championships held in Ulaanbaatar, Mongolia.
- October 2 – Jeus Gabriel Derick Yape wins the gold medal in mixed individual virtual taekwondo at the 2026 Asian Games in Nagoya, Japan, after defeating Châu Ngọc Tuyết Sang of Vietnam 2-0 in the final tournament.

=== Tennis ===
- January 26–31 – The inaugural Philippine Women's Open is held at the Rizal Memorial Sports Complex in Manila.
  - January 30 – Hong Kong's Eudice Chong and Chinese Taipei's Liang En-shuo win the doubles event, defeating the United States's Quinn Gleason and Sabrina Santamaria 2–6, 7–6^{(7–2)}, [10–6] in the final.
  - January 31 – Colombia's Camila Osorio wins the singles event, defeating Croatia's Donna Vekić 2–6, 6–3, 7–5 in the final.
- February 13 – Maristella Torrecampo wins the gold medal at the girls' singles final of the ITF Asia U14 Development Championships held in Phnom Penh, Cambodia after defeating Singapore's Zixi Wang 6–1, 6–1.
- May 28 – Alexandra Eala is included in this year's Forbes 30 Under 30 Asia list.
- June 7 – Alexandra Eala wins the women's singles of the 2026 Birmingham Open after defeating Nikola Bartůňková in three sets 5–7, 6–3, 7–5 in the final.
- August 4 – Alexandra Eala wins the women's singles of the 2026 Mubadala DC Open after defeating Jessica Pegula in three sets 4−6, 6−4, 6−0 in the final. She becomes the first Filipino player to win a WTA Tour title.
- October 1 – Alexandra Eala wins the bronze medal in women’s singles at the 2026 Asian Games in Nagoya, Japan, after losing to Wang Xiyu of China in three sets 3-6, 6-3, 6-2 in the semifinal.
- November 8 – Alexandra Eala finishes runner-up in women's singles at the 2026 Hong Kong Tennis Open after losing to Claire Liu in two sets, 3–6, 0–6 in the final.

=== Volleyball ===
- January 10 – The Petro Gazz Angels go on a leave of absence in the Premier Volleyball League.
- January 30 – The Cignal HD Spikers go on a leave of absence in the Spikers' Turf.
- February 6 – Tai Bundit is appointed as head coach of the Philippine women's national team.
- April 10:
  - The Letran Lady Knights win the NCAA Season 101 women's volleyball championship after defeating the Benilde Lady Blazers 3–2 in a best-of-three game series.
  - The Benilde Blazers win the NCAA Season 101 men's volleyball championship after defeating the Mapúa Cardinals 3–0 in a best-of-three game series.
- April 19 – The Criss Cross King Crunchers win the 2026 Spikers' Turf Open Conference after defeating the Savouge Spin Doctors 2–1 in a best-of-three game series.
- April 23 – The Creamline Cool Smashers win the 2026 Premier Volleyball League All-Filipino Conference after defeating the Cignal Super Spikers 3–2 in a best-of-three game series.
- April 28 – The Cignal Super Spikers go on a leave of absence in the Premier Volleyball League.
- May 9:
  - The De La Salle Lady Spikers win the UAAP Season 88 women's volleyball championship after defeating the NU Lady Bulldogs 3–0 in a best-of-three game series.
  - The NU Bulldogs win the UAAP Season 88 men's volleyball championship after defeating the FEU Tamaraws 3–0 in a best-of-three game series.
- May 29 – The Fédération Internationale de Volleyball (FIVB) suspends the Philippine National Volleyball Federation (PNVF) citing serious governance concerns and multiple purported violations of its organization's code of ethics.
- June 6–14 – The 2026 AVC Women's Volleyball Nations Cup is held in Candon, Ilocos Sur.
- June 7 – Sisi Rondina and Bernadeth Pons win the silver medal at the AVC Beach Tour Pingtung Open held in Pintung, Taiwan after losing to Australian duo Taliqua Clancy and Stefie Fejes 19–21, 12–21 in the final.
- June 17–21 – The Pool 5 of the 2026 FIVB Women's Volleyball Nations League is held at the PhilSports Arena in Pasig.
- August 9 – The Philippines women's national volleyball team wins the silver medal at the second leg of the 2026 SEA Women's V Cup in Chiang Mai, Thailand, after defeating Indonesia 3–1.
- August 5–15 – The Philippines women's national team participate at the 2026 FIVB Volleyball Girls' U17 World Championship in Santiago, Chile.
- August 10 – Frank Lao is elected president of the PNVF, ending the caretaker administrative role of the Philippine Olympic Committee over the body following its suspension by the FIVB in June.
- August 22 – Sofia Pagara and Khy Progella win the gold medal at the AVC Volleyball World Beach Pro Tour Futures held in Busan, South Korea after defeating Sisi Rondina and Bernadeth Pons in two sets 21–18, 21–13 in all-Filipino final tournament.
- September 8 – Thai side EST Cola win the 2026 Premier Volleyball League Invitational Conference after defeating the Nxled Chameleons 3–0 at the Araneta Coliseum in Quezon City, making them the second non-Filipino team to win a PVL championship.

=== Weightlifting ===
- May 2–8 – The Philippine delegation wins one gold, and one silver medals at the 2026 World Junior Weightlifting Championships held in Ismailia, Egypt.
- July 5–11 – The Philippine delegation wins four gold, six silver and one bronze medal at the 2026 World Youth Weightlifting Championships held in Cali, Colombia.
- August 7–14 – The Philippine delegation wins 16 gold, six silver, and nine bronze medals at the 2026 Asian Youth and Junior Weightlifting Championships held in Tashkent, Uzbekistan.

=== Wrestling ===
- August 31 – American-born player Matt Ramos obtain Filipino citizenship after Republic Act No. 12324 granting him respective naturalized status, lapses into law.

=== Wushu ===
- March 20–24 – The Philippine delegation wins 24 gold, three silver, and three bronze medals at the 21st Hong Kong International Wushu Championships held in Hong Kong, China.
- March 23–31 – The Philippine delegation wins three bronze medals at the 2026 World Junior Wushu Championships held in Tianjin, China.

=== Multi-sport events ===
- January 20–26 – The 211-strong Philippine delegation participates at the 2025 ASEAN Para Games held in Nakhon Ratchasima, Thailand, finishing fourth place overall after winning 45 gold, 37 silver, and 52 bronze medals.
- February 7–23 – The two-strong Philippine delegation participated at the 2026 Winter Olympics in Milan and Cortina d'Ampezzo, Italy.
- February 16 – The 2026 PSA Annual Awards are held at the Diamond Hotel in Manila, with gymnast Carlos Yulo and tennis player Alex Eala named as Athletes of the Year.
- March 20 – The 2026 PSC Women in Sports Awards are held at the Philippine International Convention Center in Pasay, with the Philippines women's national football team named as Athletes of the Year.
- April 12 – An 11 year-old competitor representing Lamitan at the Bangsamoro Autonomous Region in Muslim Mindanao Athletic Association (BARMMAA) Meet 2026 dies after choking during a meal at their designated accommodation in Parang, Maguindanao del Norte.
- April 22–30 – The 101-strong Philippine delegation participate at the 2026 Asian Beach Games in Sanya, China, finishing fifth overall after winning three gold, four silver, and two bronze medals.
- May 24–31 – The 66th edition of the Palarong Pambansa is held in Agusan del Sur. The National Capital Region emerges as the winner in the overall medal tally with 91 gold, 71 silver, and 71 bronze medals.
- June 20 – Seven athletes are inducted into the Philippine Sports Hall of Fame held at the Philippine Sports Commission House in Manila.
- September 19 – October 4 – The 443-strong Philippine delegation participates at the 2026 Asian Games in Aichi Prefecture, Japan. It finishes 17th overall after winning 4 gold, 9 silver, and 16 bronze medals.
- October 18–24 – The 69-strong Philippine delegation participates at the 2026 Asian Para Games in Aichi Prefecture in Japan. It finishes 17th overall after winning two gold, two silver, and three bronze medals.
- October 31 – November 13 – The 9-strong Philippine delegation participates at the 2026 Summer Youth Olympics in Dakar, Senegal. It finishes 54th overall after winning one silver and one bronze medals.

=== Predicted and scheduled ===
- December 4–13 – The Philippines men's national team will participate at the 2026 Men's World Floorball Championships in Finland.
- December 12–18 – The 17th edition of Batang Pinoy will be held in Bacolod.

== Deaths ==
- January 4 – Marissa Sanchez (b. 1956), tennis player
- February 7 – Sander Severino (b. 1985), chess player
- April 12 – Edgardo Roque (b. 1938), Olympic basketball player (1960)
- June 8:
  - Rene Baterbonia (b. 2008), basketball player (Ateneo Blue Eagles)
  - Divine Adili (b. 2005), Nigerian-born basketball player (Ateneo Blue Eagles)
- June 16 – Romy Guevarra (b. 1936 or 1937), basketball referee
- October 31 – Philip Juico (b. 1947), president of the Philippine Athletics Track and Field Association (2015–2022) and chairman of the Philippine Sports Commission (1996–1998)
- November 20 – PJ Simon (b. 1980), basketball player (Magnolia Hotshots, Davao Occidental Tigers)

== See also ==
- 2026 in the Philippines
- 2026 in sports
