= Handball at the 2025 SEA Games =

- Venue: Pattaya Chonburi Indoor Athletics Stadium, Chonburi
- Dates: 8–17 December 2025
- Nations: 6

The Handball tournaments at the 2025 SEA Games is taking place from 8 to 17 December 2025 in Chonburi, Thailand.

Last held in the 2021 edition, beach handball was not contested in the 2025 games.

== Participating nations ==
Nation	Men's	Women's
Indonesia	Yes	No
Malaysia	Yes	No
Philippines	Yes	Yes
Singapore	Yes	Yes
Thailand	Yes	Yes
Vietnam	Yes	Yes
Total: 6 NOCs	6	4

== Medal summary ==
=== Medal table ===
* Host nation (Thailand)

Rank	Nation	Gold	Silver	Bronze	Total
1	Thailand*	1	1	0	2
1	Vietnam	1	1	0	2
3	Singapore	0	0	2	2
4	Indonesia	0	0	1	1
4	Philippines	0	0	1	1
Totals (5 entries)		2	2	4	8

=== Medalist ===
Event	Gold	Silver	Bronze
Men's indoor	Thailand	Vietnam	Indonesia; Singapore
Women's indoor	Vietnam	Thailand	Philippines; Singapore

== Men's tournament ==
=== Preliminary round ===
Pos	Team	Pld	W	D	L	GF	GA	GD	Pts	Qualification
1	Thailand	5	5	0	0	173	105	+68	10	Semifinals
2	Vietnam	5	4	0	1	139	119	+20	8	Semifinals
3	Singapore	5	3	0	2	123	110	+13	6	Semifinals
4	Indonesia	5	2	0	3	112	135	−23	4	Semifinals
5	Philippines	5	1	0	4	116	138	−22	2	
6	Malaysia	5	0	0	5	101	157	−56	0	

Source: SEA Games 2025

8 December; 13:00	Philippines	25–27	Vietnam	Pattaya Chonburi Indoor Athletics Stadium, Chonburi
8 December; 13:00		Report		Pattaya Chonburi Indoor Athletics Stadium, Chonburi

8 December; 15:00	Malaysia	20–39	Thailand	Pattaya Chonburi Indoor Athletics Stadium, Chonburi
8 December; 15:00		Report		Pattaya Chonburi Indoor Athletics Stadium, Chonburi

8 December; 17:00	Indonesia	19–26	Singapore	Pattaya Chonburi Indoor Athletics Stadium, Chonburi
8 December; 17:00		Report		Pattaya Chonburi Indoor Athletics Stadium, Chonburi

10 December; 15:00	Indonesia	22–34	Thailand	Pattaya Chonburi Indoor Athletics Stadium, Chonburi
10 December; 15:00		Report		Pattaya Chonburi Indoor Athletics Stadium, Chonburi

10 December; 17:00	Singapore	19–26	Vietnam	Pattaya Chonburi Indoor Athletics Stadium, Chonburi
10 December; 17:00		Report		Pattaya Chonburi Indoor Athletics Stadium, Chonburi

11 December; 15:00	Malaysia	23–24	Philippines	Pattaya Chonburi Indoor Athletics Stadium, Chonburi
11 December; 15:00		Report		Pattaya Chonburi Indoor Athletics Stadium, Chonburi

11 December; 17:00	Thailand	30–25	Vietnam	Pattaya Chonburi Indoor Athletics Stadium, Chonburi
11 December; 17:00		Report		Pattaya Chonburi Indoor Athletics Stadium, Chonburi

12 December; 15:00	Singapore	24–23	Philippines	Pattaya Chonburi Indoor Athletics Stadium, Chonburi
12 December; 15:00		Report		Pattaya Chonburi Indoor Athletics Stadium, Chonburi

12 December; 17:00	Indonesia	27–21	Malaysia	Pattaya Chonburi Indoor Athletics Stadium, Chonburi
12 December; 17:00		Report		Pattaya Chonburi Indoor Athletics Stadium, Chonburi

13 December; 11:00	Thailand	33–20	Singapore	Pattaya Chonburi Indoor Athletics Stadium, Chonburi
13 December; 11:00		Report		Pattaya Chonburi Indoor Athletics Stadium, Chonburi

13 December; 15:00	Indonesia	27–26	Philippines	Pattaya Chonburi Indoor Athletics Stadium, Chonburi
13 December; 15:00		Report		Pattaya Chonburi Indoor Athletics Stadium, Chonburi

13 December; 17:00	Malaysia	28–33	Vietnam	Pattaya Chonburi Indoor Athletics Stadium, Chonburi
13 December; 17:00		Report		Pattaya Chonburi Indoor Athletics Stadium, Chonburi

14 December; 13:00	Thailand	37–18	Philippines	Pattaya Chonburi Indoor Athletics Stadium, Chonburi
14 December; 13:00		Report		Pattaya Chonburi Indoor Athletics Stadium, Chonburi

14 December; 15:00	Malaysia	9–34	Singapore	Pattaya Chonburi Indoor Athletics Stadium, Chonburi
14 December; 15:00		Report		Pattaya Chonburi Indoor Athletics Stadium, Chonburi

14 December; 17:00	Indonesia	17–28	Vietnam	Pattaya Chonburi Indoor Athletics Stadium, Chonburi
14 December; 17:00		Report		Pattaya Chonburi Indoor Athletics Stadium, Chonburi

=== Knockout stage ===
==== Bracket ====
Semifinals
15 December
Vietnam	27
Singapore	25
15 December
Thailand	35
Indonesia	32

Gold medal
17 December
Vietnam	35
Thailand	39

==== Semifinals ====
15 December; 17:00	Vietnam	27–25	Singapore	Pattaya Chonburi Indoor Athletics Stadium, Chonburi
15 December; 17:00		Report		Pattaya Chonburi Indoor Athletics Stadium, Chonburi

15 December; 15:00	Thailand	35–32	Indonesia	Pattaya Chonburi Indoor Athletics Stadium, Chonburi
15 December; 15:00		Report		Pattaya Chonburi Indoor Athletics Stadium, Chonburi

==== Gold medal game ====
17 December; 16:00	Vietnam	35–39	Thailand	Pattaya Chonburi Indoor Athletics Stadium, Chonburi
17 December; 16:00		Report		Pattaya Chonburi Indoor Athletics Stadium, Chonburi

== Women's tournament ==
Pos	Team	Pld	W	D	L	GF	GA	GD	Pts	Qualification
1	Vietnam	3	3	0	0	96	55	+41	6	Semifinals
2	Thailand	3	2	0	1	86	57	+29	4	Semifinals
3	Singapore	3	1	0	2	63	74	−11	2	Semifinals
4	Philippines	3	0	0	3	36	95	−59	0	Semifinals

Source: SEA Games 2025

8 December; 11:00	Thailand	31–17	Singapore	Pattaya Chonburi Indoor Athletics Stadium, Chonburi
8 December; 11:00		Report		Pattaya Chonburi Indoor Athletics Stadium, Chonburi

10 December; 13:00	Philippines	12–37	Vietnam	Pattaya Chonburi Indoor Athletics Stadium, Chonburi
10 December; 13:00		Report		Pattaya Chonburi Indoor Athletics Stadium, Chonburi

11 December; 13:00	Philippines	10–32	Thailand	Pattaya Chonburi Indoor Athletics Stadium, Chonburi
11 December; 13:00		Report		Pattaya Chonburi Indoor Athletics Stadium, Chonburi

12 December; 13:00	Philippines	14–26	Singapore	Pattaya Chonburi Indoor Athletics Stadium, Chonburi
12 December; 13:00		Report		Pattaya Chonburi Indoor Athletics Stadium, Chonburi

13 December; 13:00	Thailand	23–30	Vietnam	Pattaya Chonburi Indoor Athletics Stadium, Chonburi
13 December; 13:00		Report		Pattaya Chonburi Indoor Athletics Stadium, Chonburi

14 December; 11:00	Singapore	20–29	Vietnam	Pattaya Chonburi Indoor Athletics Stadium, Chonburi
14 December; 11:00		Report		Pattaya Chonburi Indoor Athletics Stadium, Chonburi

=== Knockout stage ===
==== Bracket ====
Semifinals
15 December
Vietnam	28
Philippines	8
15 December
Thailand	29
Singapore	23

Gold medal
17 December
Vietnam	24
Thailand	16

==== Semifinals ====
15 December; 11:00	Vietnam	28–8	Philippines	Pattaya Chonburi Indoor Athletics Stadium, Chonburi
15 December; 11:00		Report		Pattaya Chonburi Indoor Athletics Stadium, Chonburi

15 December; 13:00	Thailand	29–23	Singapore	Pattaya Chonburi Indoor Athletics Stadium, Chonburi
15 December; 13:00		Report		Pattaya Chonburi Indoor Athletics Stadium, Chonburi

==== Gold medal game ====
17 December; 14:00	Vietnam	24–16	Thailand	Pattaya Chonburi Indoor Athletics Stadium, Chonburi
17 December; 14:00		Report		Pattaya Chonburi Indoor Athletics Stadium, Chonburi
