= Philippines men's national junior handball team =

Philippines

Information
- Association: Philippine Handball Federation
- Coach: Joanna Franquelli

Colours
1st	2nd

Results

Summer Olympics
- Appearances: 0

World Championship
- Appearances: 0

Asian Championship
- Appearances: 0
- Last updated on Unknown.

The Philippines national junior handball team is the U-21 national team of the Philippines. It takes part in international handball competitions and is governed by the Philippine Handball Federation.

== History ==
The national team made its international debut at the 2014 IHF Trophy - Zone 1B (Southeast Asia) Zone which took place from 8-12 December, 2014 in Nusajaya, Malaysia. The tournament also saw the national teams of Brunei, Thailand, Singapore and the hosts Malaysia. The Philippines defeated Brunei, also making their debut in international handball, in their opening match with a score of 35-6 at the EduCity Indoor Stadium.

== Recent Fixtures and Results ==
December 8, 2014	Brunei	6 - 35	Philippines	EduCity Indoor Stadium, Nusajaya
December 8, 2014		Report		EduCity Indoor Stadium, Nusajaya

December 9, 2014	Philippines	9 - 29	Malaysia	EduCity Indoor Stadium, Nusajaya
December 9, 2014		Report		EduCity Indoor Stadium, Nusajaya

December 10, 2014	Indonesia	12 - 17	Philippines	EduCity Indoor Stadium, Nusajaya
December 10, 2014		Report		EduCity Indoor Stadium, Nusajaya

December 11, 2014	Thailand	20 - 25	Philippines	EduCity Indoor Stadium, Nusajaya
December 11, 2014		Report		EduCity Indoor Stadium, Nusajaya

December 12, 2014	Philippines	14 - 22	Singapore	EduCity Indoor Stadium, Nusajaya
December 12, 2014		Report		EduCity Indoor Stadium, Nusajaya
