= Steve Hontiveros =

Filipino sports executive

- Born: Stephen C. Hontiveros
- Occupation: Sports executive

Stephen C. Hontiveros is a Filipino sports executive who was President of the Fédération Internationale des Quilleur (FIQ) and is the current chairman of the Philippine Olympic Committee (POC).

== Background ==
Steve Hontiveros has attended the De La Salle University, graduating from the school's high school in 1963 and attained his college degree in 1968.

He has been involved in bowling in the Philippines since the 1980s and is a long-time member of the POC having been a member of the sports organization since 1977. He has served in the POC in various positions; treasurer, secretary-general, and chairman.

He was president of the Philippine Bowling Congress, and the Philippine Bowling Federation. He was the president of the Philippine Handball Federation from around the early 2010s until 2026.
