= Philippine Bowling Congress =

- IOC nation: Philippines
- Sport: Ten-pin bowling

History
- Year of formation: 1975
- Year of disbandment: 2016
- Superseded by: Philippine Bowling Federation

The Philippine Bowling Congress Inc. or more popularly known as Philippine Bowling Congress and PBC was the governing body for tenpin bowling in the Philippines from 1977 to 2016. The Philippine Bowling Federation Inc. PBF replaced it as the appointed member of the International Bowling Federation (IBF), Asian Bowling Federation (ABF), and Philippine Olympic Committee (POC). in 2016.

== History ==
The POC member organization PBC registered with the Securities Exchange Commission (SEC) on September 24, 1975, with a 25-year corporate term and Col. Nereo C. Andolong as its president and representative to the POC. He was elected the second president of the Philippine Olympic Committee in 1977. Col. Andolong became a director and president of PBC through Magallanes Bowling Association (MBA), founded with Vicente Sotto III.

Philippine Bowling Congress SEC registration was officially revoked in 2003 when it allowed its corporate term to expire without complying with law requirements to extend its corporate period of existence stated in the articles of incorporation. However, it continued its usual business as the member association recognized by the governing bodies. Despite this, a new organization bearing a confusingly similar name, Philippine Bowling Congress (PBCI) Inc., was registered with SEC in January 2009 and assumed the role of PBC without valid authorization. This confusingly similar corporation never applied for membership and was never officially recognized by any governing body; instead, only the original member, Philippine Bowling Congress, remained affiliated. POC identified the Officers of PBCI from 2009 to 2016 as that of PBC. Per Philippine law, these are two different entities. Philippine Bowling Congress membership with the POC was also eventually revoked.

In early 2016, after the resignation of the newly elected president and vice president of PBCI, the Philippine Olympic Committee established a caretaker body that will temporarily handle the affairs of Philippine bowling, and POC appointed secretary general Steve Hontiveros who was the last president of the defunct Philippine Bowling Congress Inc.

Presidents of PBC before POC Recognition

List of PBC presidents
President	Term	
President	From	To
Eduardo Limjuco	1966	1967
Bill Yvanovich	1967	1968
Jose "Dondoy" V. Del Rosario	1968	1969
Ernesto "Toti" Lopa	1969	1971
Arch. Edgar Reformado	1971	1973
Ren Silayan	1973	1975

Ernesto A. Lopa established the Philippine Bowling Federation in 1968 before co-founding the PBC in 1969. He was also Fédération Internationale des Quilleurs Asian Zone vice president from 1973-1976. He was also elected to the FIQ World Presidium in London England from 1975-1977.

PBC presidents while POC recognized

List of presidents original 1975 PBC
President	Term	
President	From	To
Col. Nereo C. Andolong	1975	1981
Pablo P. Carlos, Jr.	1981	1984
Col. Irwin Ver	1984	1986
Stephen C. Hontiveros	1986	1994
Col. Ceferino "Jun" Sarmenta	1994	1996
Admiral Reuben Lista PN (GSC)	1996	1998
Arch. Ricardo Poblete	1998	2001
Stephen C. Hontiveros	2001	2009

The Philippine Bowling Congress, Inc. was registered with the Securities Exchange Commission on September 24, 1975 S.E.C. Reg. No. 63697. Its first official president was Nereo C. Andolong who was also the second president of the Philippine Olympic Committee from 1977-1980.

- In 1985, PBC amended the composition of the Board of Directors;
- Col. Irwin Ver did not complete his term and was succeeded by his Vice President Stephen C. Hontiveros in 1986.
- In 1988 amended Art. III of the Articles of Incorporation;
- In 1993 amended the term of the president to four years, to synchronize it with the term of the POC election, all other officers were for two years and was scheduled after the 1994 term of three years. The position of Chairman was also added, the Chairmen who served in 1994 were Senator Franklin Drillon (then Justice Secretary) and former PSC Commissioner Philip Ella Juico (PBL Commissioner);
- In October 1997, the Amendment Committee headed by Arch. Edgar Reformado moved to change the manner of election in the By-Laws (to trustee election) among others and extension of corporate term in the Articles of Incorporation. However, PBC allowed its corporate term to expire without complying with the requirements provided by law for the extension of its corporate term of existence during the presidency of Arch. Ric Poblete.
- Stephen C. Hontiveros was elected president of Fédération Internationale des Quilleurs, the governing body of Tenpin Bowling, 2003-2007.

Presidents of PBCI recognized as PBC

List of presidents 2009 PBC (PBCI) Inc.
President	Term	
President	From	To
Mariano Tamayo	2009	2011
Ernesto Lopa	2011	2013
Dr. Ronaldo V. Mendoza	2013	2016
Engr. Mario G. Lualhati	2015	2016

== Athletes and their achievements ==
The Philippines has produced multi-world champions Paeng Nepomuceno, Lita dela Rosa and Bong Coo, world champions Oliver Ongtawco, Cj Suarrez, Biboy Rivera, Team Trios Gold medalists Liza Del Rosario, Liza Clutario and Cecilia Yap and Olympic Gold Medalist Arianne Cerdeña.

Paeng Nepomuceno and Bong Coo were inducted to the International Bowling Hall of Fame in 1993. Lita Dela Rosa was posthumously inducted in 2000. All three were elected to the Philippine Sports Hall of Fame in 2019.

=== 1988 Summer Olympic Games ===
Bowling at the 1988 Summer Olympics was a demonstration sport for the first, and so far only time. In all, a total of 20 nations competed in the exhibition, which was held on September 18 at the Seoul's Royal Bowling Center. Nonetheless, Arianne Cerdeña won for the Philippines its first gold medal in the Olympic Games.

==== Results ====
Games	Gold	Silver	Bronze
Men's tournament	Kwon Jong Yul; South Korea	Jack Wong Loke Chin; Singapore	Tapani Peltola; Finland
Women's tournament	Arianne Cerdeña; Philippines	Atsuko Asai; Japan	Annikki Maattola; Finland

=== WTBA World Tenpin Bowling Championship ===
The World Tenpin Bowling Championships is a global event that invites all countries that are members of the World Bowling to participate. This tournament is held every 4th year until 2006. It is the most prestigious tournament in the bowling world.

==== Men ====
Games	Gold	Silver	Bronze
1979 Manila; SINGLES	(Philippines) Ollie Ongtawco	(Venezuela) Rogelio Felice	(Japan) Michio Matsubara
1987 Helsinki; SINGLES	(France) Patrick Rolland	(Philippines) Paeng Nepomuceno	(United States) Rick Steelsmith
1991 Singapore; DOUBLES	USA; Pat Healey; Steve Kloempken	Japan; Kengo Tagata; HiroshiYamamoto	Philippines; Paeng Nepomuceno; Paulo Valdez
1983 Caracas; TRIOS	Sweden; Kenneth Andersson; Tony Rosenquist; Mats Karlsson	Philippines; Paeng Nepomuceno; Rauel Reformado; Oliver Ongtawco	USA; Toni Cariello; Darold Meisel; Ruch Wonders
1991 Singapore; 5 MAN TEAM	Chinese Taipei; Ying-Chieh Ma; Chien-Yi Tang; Cheng-Ming Yang; Te-Lin Lai; Chao-Hsiung Lin; Peng-Sheng Cheng	Philippines; Paeng Nepomuceno; Rudy Salazar; Paulo Valdez; Rene Reyes; Jing Sablan; Efren Guerrero	Netherlands; Erik Kok; Erwin Groen; Fedde de Boer; Marcel vd Bosch; Andre van Gurp; Bart Jan Boogaart
2006 Busan	(Philippines) Biboy Rivera	(Germany) Achim Grabowski	(Australia) Jason Belmonte
2006 Busan	(Philippines) Biboy Rivera	(Germany) Achim Grabowski	(United States) Rhino Page

==== Women ====
Games	Gold	Silver	Bronze
1979 Manila; SINGLES	(Philippines) Lita de la Rosa	(Sweden) Yvonne Nilsson	(Thailand) Orawan Nithinakakorn
1979 Manila; DOUBLES	Philippines; Lita De La Rosa; Bong Coo	Finland; Eija Krogerus; Tuula Kaartinen	Japan; Kyogo Yamaguchi; Harumi Morisaki
1979 Manila; TRIOS	USA; Annese Kelly; Cindy Schuble; Jackie Stormo	Philippines; Bong Coo; Nellie Castillo; Lita de la Rosa	Sweden; Ingrid Sellgren; Annette Hägre; Yvonne Nilsson
1983 Caracas; TRIOS	West Germany; Hani Hoplitchek; Christen Huesler; Gisela Lins	USA; Dixie Kirk; Yvonne Dowland; Janine DitchKirk Philippines; Bong Coo; Arianne Cerdeña; Lita de la Rosa	Not Awarded
2003 Kuala Lumpur; TRIOS	Philippines; Liza del Rosario; Liza Clutario; Cecilia Yap	England; Zara Glover; Kirsten Penny; Lisa John	USA; Lucy Sandelin; Diandra Hyman; Emma Rutten
1979 Manila; ALL EVENTS	(Philippines) Bong Coo	(Sweden) Yvonne Nilsson	(Philippines) Lita de la Rosa
1983 Caracas; ALL EVENTS	(Philippines) Bong Coo	(Sweden) Lena Sulkanen	(Sweden) Aasa Larsson
2003 Kuala Lumpur; ALL EVENTS	(England) Zara Glover	(United States) Diandra Hyman	(Philippines) Liza Clutario
1979 Manila; MASTERS	(Philippines) Lita de la Rosa	(West Germany) Daniela Gruber	(Sweden) Yvonne Nilsson

==== Women's medal table ====
As 2019

Rank	Nation	Gold	Silver	Bronze	Total
1	United States (USA)	29	26	28	83
2	South Korea (KOR)	16	9	15	40
3	Sweden (SWE)	7	14	9	30
4	Philippines (PHI)	6	3	2	11
5	Malaysia (MAS)	5	8	3	16
6	Japan (JPN)	5	4	5	14
7	Australia (AUS)	4	6	8	18
8	Finland (FIN)	4	6	6	16
8	Germany (GER)	4	6	6	16
10	Colombia (COL)	4	4	6	14
10	Mexico (MEX)	4	4	6	14
12	Chinese Taipei (TPE)	4	2	4	10
13	Canada (CAN)	3	4	0	7
14	Denmark (DEN)	3	2	9	14
15	England (ENG)	3	1	5	9
16	Singapore (SIN)	2	8	7	17
17	China (CHN)	1	1	0	2
18	Puerto Rico (PUR)	1	0	2	3
19	Thailand (THA)	1	0	1	2
20	Venezuela (VEN)	0	0	4	4
21	Hong Kong (HKG)	0	0	2	2
21	Indonesia (INA)	0	0	2	2
23	Austria (AUT)	0	0	1	1
23	Belgium (BEL)	0	0	1	1
23	France (FRA)	0	0	1	1
23	Latvia (LAT)	0	0	1	1
23	South Africa (SAF)	0	0	1	1
Totals (27 entries)		106	108	135	349

==== Men's medal table ====
As 2018

Rank	Nation	Gold	Silver	Bronze	Total
1	United States (USA)	32	26	23	81
2	Sweden (SWE)	19	12	12	43
3	Finland (FIN)	11	17	16	44
4	South Korea (KOR)	8	7	17	32
5	Chinese Taipei (TPE)	5	5	2	12
6	Canada (CAN)	5	4	6	15
7	England (ENG)	5	2	4	11
8	Australia (AUS)	5	1	6	12
9	Netherlands (NED)	4	2	5	11
10	Mexico (MEX)	3	7	7	17
11	Malaysia (MAS)	3	2	2	7
12	Germany (GER)	2	5	9	16
13	Philippines (PHI)	2	3	1	6
14	Belgium (BEL)	2	3	0	5
15	Singapore (SIN)	2	2	1	5
16	Venezuela (VEN)	1	3	6	10
17	Norway (NOR)	1	3	4	8
18	Colombia (COL)	1	1	4	6
18	France (FRA)	1	1	4	6
20	Denmark (DEN)	1	1	3	5
21	Puerto Rico (PUR)	1	1	1	3
22	Hong Kong (HKG)	1	1	0	2
23	Italy (ITA)	1	0	1	2
23	Qatar (QAT)	1	0	1	2
25	Japan (JPN)	0	6	4	10
26	United Arab Emirates (UAE)	0	1	3	4
27	Indonesia (INA)	0	1	0	1
28	Guam (GUM)	0	0	1	1
28	Ireland (IRL)	0	0	1	1
28	Kuwait (KUW)	0	0	1	1
Totals (30 entries)		117	117	145	379

=== World Games ===
Games	Gold	Silver	Bronze
1993 The Hague; SINGLES	Tomas Leandersson (SWE)	Yvan Augustin (FRA)	Paeng Nepomuceno (PHI)
1997 Lahti; SINGLES	Gery Verbruggen (BEL)	Vernon Peterson (USA)	Paeng Nepomuceno (PHI)
1989 Karlsruhe; SINGLES	Jane Amlinger (CAN)	Arianne Cerdeña (PHI)	Patty Ann (USA)
1985 London; MIXED DOUBLES	Belgium (BEL); Nora Haveneers; Dominique De Nolf	West Germany (FRG); Gisela Lins; Utz Dehler	Philippines (PHI); Bong Coo; Rene Reyes
1989 Karlsruhe; MIXED DOUBLES	Chinese Taipei (TPE); Ma Ying-Chieh; Huang Yuen-Yue	Philippines (PHI); Arianne Cerdeña; Jorge Fernández	West Germany (FRG); Michaela Viol; Wolfgang Strupf

=== QubicaAMF Bowling World Cup ===
Year	Location	Men	Women
1976	Tehran, Iran	(Philippines) Paeng Nepomuceno	(United States) Lucy Giovinco
1978	Bogotá, Colombia	(Thailand) Samran Banyen	(Philippines) Lita de la Rosa
1979	Bangkok, Thailand	(France) Philippe Dubois	(Philippines) Bong Coo
1980	Jakarta, Indonesia	(Philippines) Paeng Nepomuceno	(Canada) Jean Gordon
1992	Le Mans, France	(Philippines) Paeng Nepomuceno	(Germany) Martina Beckel
1996	Belfast, Northern Ireland	(Philippines) Paeng Nepomuceno	(Australia) Cara Honeychurch
2003	Tegucigalpa, Honduras	(Philippines) Christian Jan Suarez	(Canada) Kerrie Ryan-Ciach
2017	Hermosillo, Mexico	(United States) Jakob Butturff	(Philippines) Krizziah Tabora

=== World Youth Bowling Championships ===
The World Youth Bowling Championships was spearheaded by Philippine Junior Bowlers President Peping Cojuangco (now POC president) in 1991. The Cojuanco Cup is awarded each year to the winningest country. It is on its 13th edition held in Nebraska, United States in August 2016.

==== Boys ====
Games	Gold	Silver	Bronze
1st Manila, Philippines 1991; ALL EVENTS	Lasse Lintila (FIN)	Paulo Valdez (PHI)	Ahmed Shaheen (QAT)
2nd Caracas, Venezuela - 1992; SINGLES	Angelo Constantino (PHI)	Lee Dong-Hee (KOR)	Seo Kook (KOR)
DOUBLES	Philippines; Noberito Constantino; Angelo Constantino	Qatar; Khalid Al-Sada; Soud Al-Hajri	Korea; Lee Dong-Hee; Seo Kook
ALL EVENTS	Soud Al-Hajri (QAT)	Angelo Constantino (PHI)	Seo Kook (KOR)
MASTERS	Anthony Chapman (USA)	Seo Kook (KOR)	Angelo Constantino (PHI)
5th Inchon City, Korea - 1998; SINGLES	Shawn Evans (USA)	Tamman Sharif (KSA)	R.J. Bautista (PHI)

=== Asian Games ===
==== Men ====
Games	Gold	Silver	Bronze
1986 Seoul; SINGLES	(Japan) Masami Hirai	(Philippines) Renato Reyes	(Malaysia) Chee Meng Wang
1998 Bangkok; SINGLES	(Chinese Taipei) Wu Fulung	(Thailand) Kritchawat Jampakao	(Philippines) Virgilio Sablan
2010 Guangzhou; SINGLES	(Philippines) Engelberto Rivera	(Kuwait) Mohammed al-Rgeebah	(Philippines) Frederick Ong
1986 Seoul; DOUBLES	Japan; Kengo Tagata; Hiroshi Ishihara	Philippines; Delfin Garcia; Jorge Fernandez	Thailand; Montri Setvipisinee; Surachai Kasemsiriroj
2002 Busan	Philippines; Paeng Nepomuceno; Rowen Jay Bautista	Japan; Isao Yamamoto; Seiji Watanabe	South Korea; Kim Myoung-Jo; Jo Nam-Yi
1978 Bangkok; TRIOS	Thailand; Samran Banyen; Kasem Minalai; Montree Vipisini	Japan; Masami Hirai; Toshihiro Takahashi; Kiyoshi Taneda	Philippines; Vicente Tito Sotto; Emmanuel "Sonny" Sugatan; Jose Peping Santos
2002 Busan; TRIOS	Singapore; Goh Heng Soon; Lee Yu Wen; Ong Remy	Philippines; Christian Jan Suarez; Chester King; Leonardo Rey	Not awarded
2002 Busan; TRIOS	Singapore; Goh Heng Soon; Lee Yu Wen; Ong Remy	UAE; Mohamed Al Qubaisi; Shaker Al Hassan; Hulaiman Al Hamli	Not awarded
1994 Hiroshima; 5 MAN TEAM	South Korea; Min Cheol-ki; Seo Kook; Lee Yun-jae; Byun Ho-jin; Kim Sung-joo; Lee Jae-ho	Philippines; Jorge Fernandez; Paeng Nepomuceno; Renato Reyes; Paulo Valdez; Angelo Nathaniel Constantino	Japan; Kengo Tagata; Hiroshi Yamamoto; Nobuyuki Takahama; Kosei Wada; Kosaku Tatemoto

==== Women ====
Games	Gold	Silver	Bronze
1978 Bangkok; SINGLES	(Philippines) Bong Coo	(Philippines) Rosario de Leon	(Hong Kong) Catherin Che
2002 Busan; SINGLES	(South Korea) Kim Soo-Kyung	(Japan) Miyuki Kubotani	(Philippines) Liza Clutario
1978 Bangkok; DOUBLES	Thailand	Japan	Philippines
1986 Seoul; DOUBLES	Japan	Japan	Philippines; Arianne Cerdeña; Bong Coo
1978 Bangkok; TRIOS	Thailand	Philippines; Bong Coo; Lolita Reformado; Lita de la Rosa	Hong Kong
1978 Bangkok; 5 MAN TEAM	Philippines; Rosario de Leon; Lolita Reformado; Lita de la Rosa; Nellie Castillo; Bong Coo	Thailand	South Korea
1986 Seoul; 5 MAN TEAM	Philippines; Catalina Solis, Cecilia Gaffud, Rebecca Watanabe; Arianne Cerdeña; Bong Coo	Japan	South Korea
2002 Busan; 5 MAN TEAM	South Korea	Philippines	Chinese Taipei
1986 Seoul; ALL EVENTS	(Philippines) Bong Coo	(Japan) Mayumi Hayashi	(Indonesia) Poppy Marijke Tambis
1978 Bangkok; MASTERS MATCH PLAY	(Philippines) Bong Coo	(Philippines) Rosario de Leon	(Thailand) Anantita Hongsophon
1986 Seoul; MASTERS	(South Korea) Lee Ji-Yeon	(Hong Kong) Kuk Hung Che	(Philippines) Catalina Solis
1994 Hiroshima; MASTERS	(South Korea) Lee Ji-Yeon	(South Korea) Kim Sook-Young	(Philippines) Irene Garcia Benitez

==== Medal table ====
Rank	Nation	Gold	Silver	Bronze	Total
1	South Korea (KOR)	32	20	22	74
2	Japan (JPN)	16	15	8	39
3	Malaysia (MAS)	10	11	7	28
4	Chinese Taipei (TPE)	9	6	7	22
5	Philippines (PHI)	7	8	8	23
5	Singapore (SIN)	7	8	8	23
Totals (6 entries)		81	68	60	209

=== Southeast Asian Games ===
Upon the return of past PBC President Ernesto "Toti" Lopa, the Men's team medalled in all five events at the 26th Southeast Asian Games.

Event	Gold	Silver	Bronze
Men's singles	Frederick Ong; Philippines	Jeremy Posadas; Philippines	Adrian Ang Hsien Loong; Malaysia
Men's doubles	Malaysia (MAS); Adrian Ang Hsien Loong; Liew Kien Liang	Philippines (PHI); Engelberto Rivera; Frederick Ong	Malaysia (MAS); Muhamad Syafiq Ridhwan; Zulmazran Zulkifli
Men's trios	Malaysia (MAS); Adrian Ang Hsien Loong; Liew Kien Liang; Zulmazran Zulkifli	Malaysia (MAS); Aaron Kong Eng Chuan; Muhamad Syafiq Ridhwan; Muhammad Nur Aiman	Philippines (PHI); Engelberto Rivera; Frederick Ong; Raoul Miranda
Men's team of five	Malaysia (MAS); Adrian Ang Hsien Loong; Liew Kien Liang; Zulmazran Zulkifli; Aaron Kong Eng Chuan; Muhamad Syafiq Ridhwan; Muhammad Nur Aiman	Philippines (PHI); Engelberto Rivera; Frederick Ong; Raoul Miranda; Jeremy Posadas; Giancarlo Mansilungan; Rogelio Enriquez Jr.	Indonesia (INA); Ryan Leonard Lalisang; Oscar; Billy Muhammad Islam; Hardy Rachmadian; Yeri Ramadona
Men's masters	Adrian Ang Hsien Loong; Malaysia	Frederick Ong; Philippines	Muhamad Syafiq Ridhwan; Malaysia

Sources includes the European Bowling Federation, World Bowling, Asian Bowling Federation
