= Philippines women's national handball team =

Philippines

Information
- Association: Philippine Handball Federation
- Coach: Joanna Franquelli

Colours
1st	2nd

Results

Summer Olympics
- Appearances: 0

World Championship
- Appearances: 0

Asian Championship
- Appearances: 0
- Last updated on Unknown.

The Philippines women's national handball team is the national team of the Philippines. It takes part in international handball competitions and is governed by the Philippine Handball Federation. The team is also known by its moniker, Amigas.

== History ==
The national team made its international debut at the 2013 Southeast Asian Women's Handball Championships in Ubon Ratchathani, Thailand, which was held in December 2013. The team, coached by former national basketball and fencing champion Joanna Franquelli was formed just two months before the tournament.

The Philippines returned for the 2015 edition of the same tournament in Ho Chi Minh City, Vietnam.

In early 2025, the pre-existing beach handball squad was being prepared to participate at the 2025 SEA Games in Thailand.

== Competitive record ==
=== SEA Games ===
Games	Round	Position	Pld	W	D	L	GF	GA	GD
2021 Vietnam	did not enter								
2025 Thailand	to be determined								
Total	1/2	0 Titles	0	0	0	0	0	0	0
