= 2024 Asian Women's Handball Championship =

Tournament details
- Host country: India
- Venue: 1 (in 1 host city)
- Dates: 3–10 December
- Teams: 8 (from 1 confederation)

Final positions
- Champions: Japan (2nd title)
- Runners-up: South Korea
- Third place: Kazakhstan
- Fourth place: Iran

Tournament statistics
- Matches played: 20
- Goals scored: 1,061 (53.05 per match)

The 2024 Asian Women's Handball Championship was the 20th edition of the Asian Women's Handball Championship, which took place from 3 to 10 December 2024 in New Delhi, India. It was scheduled to be held in Almaty, Kazakhstan but later moved to India. The tournament was held under the aegis of Asian Handball Federation and acted as the Asian qualifying tournament for the 2025 World Women's Handball Championship, with the top four teams qualifying. If countries from Oceania (Australia) would have participated in the tournament finished in the top 5, they would have qualified for the World Championships.

Japan defeated title holders South Korea 25–24 to win their second title and their first since 2004.

== Draw ==
The draw was scheduled to be held on 22 September 2024, but later postponed. The draw took place on 18 October 2024.

=== Seeding ===
Pot 1	Pot 2	Pot 3	Pot 4	Pot 5
India; South Korea	Japan; China	Iran; Kazakhstan	~~Uzbekistan~~; Hong Kong	~~Australia~~; Singapore

- Australia and Uzbekistan withdrew before the tournament.

== Preliminary round ==
All times are local (UTC+5:30).

=== Group A ===
Pos	Team	Pld	W	D	L	GF	GA	GD	Pts	Qualification
1	South Korea	3	3	0	0	102	39	+63	6	Semifinals
2	Kazakhstan	3	2	0	1	86	63	+23	4	Semifinals
3	China	3	1	0	2	87	63	+24	2	5–8th place semifinals
4	Singapore	3	0	0	3	22	132	−110	0	5–8th place semifinals

Source: Asianhandball
Rules for classification: 1) points; 2) head-to-head points; 3) head-to-head goal difference; 4) head-to-head number of goals scored; 5) goal difference.

3 December 2024; 12:00	China	26–28	Kazakhstan	Indira Gandhi Arena, New Delhi; Referees: Gheisarian, Gheisarian (IRI)
3 December 2024; 12:00	Wang Jia. 7	(12–11)	Radayeva 9	Indira Gandhi Arena, New Delhi; Referees: Gheisarian, Gheisarian (IRI)
3 December 2024; 12:00	3× (suspension)	Report	1× (suspension)	Indira Gandhi Arena, New Delhi; Referees: Gheisarian, Gheisarian (IRI)

3 December 2024; 16:00	South Korea	47–5	Singapore	Indira Gandhi Arena, New Delhi; Referees: Mozafari, Mazaheri (IRI)
3 December 2024; 16:00	Jeon 11	(22–2)	K. Foo 2	Indira Gandhi Arena, New Delhi; Referees: Mozafari, Mazaheri (IRI)
3 December 2024; 16:00		Report	1× (suspension)	Indira Gandhi Arena, New Delhi; Referees: Mozafari, Mazaheri (IRI)

4 December 2024; 12:00	Singapore	10–47	China	Indira Gandhi Arena, New Delhi; Referees: Al-Wahibi, Al-Shahi (OMA)
4 December 2024; 12:00	Gan 5	(6–22)	Hou 8	Indira Gandhi Arena, New Delhi; Referees: Al-Wahibi, Al-Shahi (OMA)
4 December 2024; 12:00	1× (suspension)	Report	2× (suspension)	Indira Gandhi Arena, New Delhi; Referees: Al-Wahibi, Al-Shahi (OMA)

4 December 2024; 16:00	Kazakhstan	20–30	South Korea	Indira Gandhi Arena, New Delhi; Referees: Al-Naseem, Al-Enezi (KUW)
4 December 2024; 16:00	Khardina, Malysheva 5	(10–17)	Cha 7	Indira Gandhi Arena, New Delhi; Referees: Al-Naseem, Al-Enezi (KUW)
4 December 2024; 16:00	4× (suspension)	Report	3× (suspension)	Indira Gandhi Arena, New Delhi; Referees: Al-Naseem, Al-Enezi (KUW)

6 December 2024; 12:00	Kazakhstan	38–7	Singapore	Indira Gandhi Arena, New Delhi; Referees: Mozafari, Mazaheri (IRI)
6 December 2024; 12:00	Radayeva 6	(23–4)	three players 2	Indira Gandhi Arena, New Delhi; Referees: Mozafari, Mazaheri (IRI)
6 December 2024; 12:00	2× (suspension)	Report	2× (suspension)	Indira Gandhi Arena, New Delhi; Referees: Mozafari, Mazaheri (IRI)

6 December 2024; 16:00	South Korea	25–14	China	Indira Gandhi Arena, New Delhi; Referees: Gheisarian, Gheisarian (IRI)
6 December 2024; 16:00	Lee Y., Seo 6	(15–9)	Wang Jia. 4	Indira Gandhi Arena, New Delhi; Referees: Gheisarian, Gheisarian (IRI)
6 December 2024; 16:00	1× (yellow card) 1× (suspension)	Report	1× (yellow card) 2× (suspension)	Indira Gandhi Arena, New Delhi; Referees: Gheisarian, Gheisarian (IRI)

=== Group B ===
Pos	Team	Pld	W	D	L	GF	GA	GD	Pts	Qualification
1	Japan	3	3	0	0	129	35	+94	6	Semifinals
2	Iran	3	2	0	1	72	81	−9	4	Semifinals
3	India (H)	3	1	0	2	76	108	−32	2	5–8th place semifinals
4	Hong Kong	3	0	0	3	51	104	−53	0	5–8th place semifinals

Source: Asianhandball
Rules for classification: 1) points; 2) head-to-head points; 3) head-to-head goal difference; 4) head-to-head number of goals scored; 5) goal difference.
(H) Hosts

3 December 2024; 14:00	Japan	34–14	Iran	Indira Gandhi Arena, New Delhi; Referees: Al-Naseem, Al-Enezi (KUW)
3 December 2024; 14:00	Nakayama 6	(15–5)	Kiyaniara 4	Indira Gandhi Arena, New Delhi; Referees: Al-Naseem, Al-Enezi (KUW)
3 December 2024; 14:00	3× (suspension)	Report	2× (suspension)	Indira Gandhi Arena, New Delhi; Referees: Al-Naseem, Al-Enezi (KUW)

3 December 2024; 18:00	India	31–28	Hong Kong	Indira Gandhi Arena, New Delhi; Referees: Razakbergenova, Allayarova (UZB)
3 December 2024; 18:00	M. Thakur 9	(16–10)	Lo 7	Indira Gandhi Arena, New Delhi; Referees: Razakbergenova, Allayarova (UZB)
3 December 2024; 18:00	1× (suspension)	Report	1× (yellow card) 5× (suspension)	Indira Gandhi Arena, New Delhi; Referees: Razakbergenova, Allayarova (UZB)

4 December 2024; 14:00	Hong Kong	6–47	Japan	Indira Gandhi Arena, New Delhi; Referees: Kang, Li (CHN)
4 December 2024; 14:00	six players 1	(3–27)	three players 6	Indira Gandhi Arena, New Delhi; Referees: Kang, Li (CHN)
4 December 2024; 14:00	2× (suspension)	Report	1× (suspension)	Indira Gandhi Arena, New Delhi; Referees: Kang, Li (CHN)

4 December 2024; 18:00	Iran	32–30	India	Indira Gandhi Arena, New Delhi; Referees: Ismoilov, Ismoilov (UZB)
4 December 2024; 18:00	Koudzari 7	(16–15)	B. Sharma 7	Indira Gandhi Arena, New Delhi; Referees: Ismoilov, Ismoilov (UZB)
4 December 2024; 18:00	5× (suspension)	Report	2× (suspension)	Indira Gandhi Arena, New Delhi; Referees: Ismoilov, Ismoilov (UZB)

6 December 2024; 14:00	Iran	26–17	Hong Kong	Indira Gandhi Arena, New Delhi; Referees: Al-Wahibi, Al-Shahi (OMA)
6 December 2024; 14:00	Rajabi 6	(14–9)	Wong Y. 5	Indira Gandhi Arena, New Delhi; Referees: Al-Wahibi, Al-Shahi (OMA)
6 December 2024; 14:00	6× (suspension)	Report	2× (suspension)	Indira Gandhi Arena, New Delhi; Referees: Al-Wahibi, Al-Shahi (OMA)

6 December 2024; 18:00	India	15–48	Japan	Indira Gandhi Arena, New Delhi; Referees: Razakbergenova, Allayarova (UZB)
6 December 2024; 18:00	B. Sharma 7	(8–29)	Natsubori 8	Indira Gandhi Arena, New Delhi; Referees: Razakbergenova, Allayarova (UZB)
6 December 2024; 18:00	4× (suspension)	Report		Indira Gandhi Arena, New Delhi; Referees: Razakbergenova, Allayarova (UZB)

== Knockout stage ==
=== Bracket ===
Semi-finals
8 December
South Korea	33
Iran	20
8 December
Japan	30
Kazakhstan	23

Final
10 December
South Korea	24
Japan	25
Third place
10 December
Iran	22
Kazakhstan	28

5–8th place bracket

5–8th place semifinals
8 December
China	38
Hong Kong	14
8 December
India	35
Singapore	22

Fifth place
10 December
China	41
India	30
Seventh place
10 December
Hong Kong	33
Singapore	18

==== 5–8th place semifinals ====
8 December 2024; 12:00	China	38–14	Hong Kong	Indira Gandhi Arena, New Delhi; Referees: Mozafari, Mazaheri (IRI)
8 December 2024; 12:00	Zhuo 6	(19–7)	Chong 4	Indira Gandhi Arena, New Delhi; Referees: Mozafari, Mazaheri (IRI)
8 December 2024; 12:00	3× (suspension)	Report	1× (suspension)	Indira Gandhi Arena, New Delhi; Referees: Mozafari, Mazaheri (IRI)

8 December 2024; 14:00	India	35–22	Singapore	Indira Gandhi Arena, New Delhi; Referees: Razakbergenova, Allayarova (UZB)
8 December 2024; 14:00	three players 6	(20–14)	four players 4	Indira Gandhi Arena, New Delhi; Referees: Razakbergenova, Allayarova (UZB)
8 December 2024; 14:00	2× (suspension)	Report	1× (yellow card) 1× (suspension)	Indira Gandhi Arena, New Delhi; Referees: Razakbergenova, Allayarova (UZB)

==== Semifinals ====
8 December 2024; 16:00	South Korea	33–20	Iran	Indira Gandhi Arena, New Delhi; Referees: Kang, Li (CHN)
8 December 2024; 16:00	Seo 8	(16–8)	Faghihi 5	Indira Gandhi Arena, New Delhi; Referees: Kang, Li (CHN)
8 December 2024; 16:00	3× (suspension)	Report		Indira Gandhi Arena, New Delhi; Referees: Kang, Li (CHN)

8 December 2024; 18:00	Japan	30–23	Kazakhstan	Indira Gandhi Arena, New Delhi; Referees: Al-Wahibi, Al-Shahi (OMA)
8 December 2024; 18:00	three players 4	(15–14)	Khassakhanova 7	Indira Gandhi Arena, New Delhi; Referees: Al-Wahibi, Al-Shahi (OMA)
8 December 2024; 18:00	1× (suspension)	Report	1× (suspension)	Indira Gandhi Arena, New Delhi; Referees: Al-Wahibi, Al-Shahi (OMA)

==== Seventh place game ====
10 December 2024; 12:00	Hong Kong	33–18	Singapore	Indira Gandhi Arena, New Delhi; Referees: Kang, Li (CHN)
10 December 2024; 12:00	three players 6	(18–9)	Gan 6	Indira Gandhi Arena, New Delhi; Referees: Kang, Li (CHN)
10 December 2024; 12:00	3× (suspension)	Report	3× (suspension)	Indira Gandhi Arena, New Delhi; Referees: Kang, Li (CHN)

==== Fifth place game ====
10 December 2024; 14:00	China	41–30	India	Indira Gandhi Arena, New Delhi; Referees: Gheisarian, Gheisarian (IRI)
10 December 2024; 14:00	Qu 13	(23–15)	B. Sharma 9	Indira Gandhi Arena, New Delhi; Referees: Gheisarian, Gheisarian (IRI)
10 December 2024; 14:00	4× (suspension)	Report	2× (suspension)	Indira Gandhi Arena, New Delhi; Referees: Gheisarian, Gheisarian (IRI)

==== Third place game ====
10 December 2024; 16:00	Iran	22–28	Kazakhstan	Indira Gandhi Arena, New Delhi; Referees: Al-Naseem, Al-Enezi (KUW)
10 December 2024; 16:00	Rahmanian 7	(10–13)	Khassakhanova, Radayeva 7	Indira Gandhi Arena, New Delhi; Referees: Al-Naseem, Al-Enezi (KUW)
10 December 2024; 16:00	3× (suspension)	Report	3× (suspension)	Indira Gandhi Arena, New Delhi; Referees: Al-Naseem, Al-Enezi (KUW)

==== Final ====
10 December 2024; 18:00	South Korea	24–25	Japan	Indira Gandhi Arena, New Delhi; Referees: Ismoilov, Ismoilov (UZB)
10 December 2024; 18:00	four players 4	(12–9)	Nakayama 7	Indira Gandhi Arena, New Delhi; Referees: Ismoilov, Ismoilov (UZB)
10 December 2024; 18:00	3× (suspension)	Report		Indira Gandhi Arena, New Delhi; Referees: Ismoilov, Ismoilov (UZB)

== Final standing ==
Rank	Team
1st place, gold medalist(s)	Japan
2nd place, silver medalist(s)	South Korea
3rd place, bronze medalist(s)	Kazakhstan
4	Iran
5	China
6	India
7	Hong Kong
8	Singapore

Qualified for the 2025 World Women's Handball Championship
