= Julian Malonso =

Filipino military man, educator and sports executive

3rd President of the Philippine Olympic Committee (Provisional)
- In office 1980–1980
- Preceded by: Nereo Andolong
- Succeeded by: Michael Marcos Keon

Personal details
- Born: October 18, 1923 Binondo, Manila, Philippine Islands
- Died: May 12, 2013 (aged 89) Philippines
- Spouse: Honorata Aves Tan
- Military career
- Allegiance: Philippines
- Rank: Lieutenant-Colonel
- Basketball career

Personal information
- Listed height: 5 ft 10 in (1.78 m)

Career information
- High school: Letran (Manila)
- College: UST
- Position: Center

Julian Mota Malonso (1923–2013) was a Filipino military man, educator and sports executive.

== Early life ==
Julian M. Malonso was born on October 18, 1923, in Binondo, Manila to Arayat-native Hilario Umali Malonso (who changed his surname from 'Malonzo' to 'Malonso,' to distance himself from Kapampangan rebels) and Marcela Samonte Mota, granddaughter of Jose Mota, a former Dominican candidate who arrived from Spain. The couple had met at Binondo Church (Our Lady of the Most Holy Rosary), now the Minor Basilica and National Shrine of San Lorenzo Ruiz, a stone's throw from Marcela's ancestral home along Estrella Street.

As Dominicans of the Tertiary Order, Hilario and Marcela raised their children conservatively. Before break of dawn, the children were waiting at the church doors for mass. Everyone was expected for the Angelus and daily rosary. A life-long Marian devotee, Julian would pray while driving on his way to work.

Firstborn son Julian was the second of six children. Younger siblings were Jose, Vicente, Herminia, and Asuncion. Decades later Marcela remembered her difficult delivery. Described as 'niño bonito,' Julianing, as he was fondly called, was his parents' pride. A natural leader, he engaged his brothers in rough play in their house hold, once causing a heavy wooden aparador to come crashing down. After school, Julianing took charge of their studies; he would arrange them around the dining table, having assigned each brother to a younger sister for tutoring.

When the Japanese invaded, teenaged Julianing and Joseling wanted to join the army. Pointing out that someone had to look after their elderly parents and younger siblings, Joseling instructed his brother to remain at home. 'It is enough that I go.' (Tragically Joseling who had promoted to Sargent days before his discharge, had survived the war, only to be fatally shot by his roommate who was cleaning a rifle.)

This personal and family trauma must have weighed on Julian.

After their Binondo home was razed by bombings of the returning Americans, the family found refuge with their Dominican friends at UST. They transferred their few belongings to a classroom where they pushed together chairs to form makeshift beds. Several springs on campus provided fresh water. Their father Hilario continued seeing dental patients in Intramuros. The Japanese guards would close off the university and hospital grounds at four o'clock in the afternoon. Whoever was locked out met an uncertain fate that Hilario almost faced when he once came late and had barely made it through the closing gates.

Surrounded by the starving, sick, scavenging interns of different nationalities, the Malonso family narrowly escaped liquidation with the arrival of the US armored cavalry led by Captain Manuel Colayco who was mortally wounded by the retreating Japanese. They lived temporarily in quonset huts before Binondo was rebuilt.

== Education and basketball career ==
Malonso studied at Letran College for his high school where he played for the school's basketball team. For his college he initially enrolled for Dentistry at the University of the Philippines but moved to the University of Santo Tomas (UST) after he was approached by Father Agapio, then the Spanish athletic director of UST. Agapio urged him to try out for UST varsity basketball team. With a bevy of cousins who taught in various schools, Malonso himself pursued a course on Education at UST.

Left-handed, Malonso proved difficult to guard. With his slender build, agility, focus, he was born to play. He secured a place with the UST basketball team, serving as a center. He was part of the squad of the UST Glowing Goldies that won the University Athletic Association of the Philippines in 1946. At 5 ft 10 in (1.78 m), he was the second tallest player at that time in the country. (Standing at 6' Caloy Loyzaga, father of Chito and Joey Loyzaga, towered over everyone else.)

Malonso pursued a master's degree in education at the National University. He also played at the National Collegiate Athletic Association and the Manila Industrial and Commercial Athletic Association

== Career as an educator and sports official ==
Malonso worked as a Spanish educator at Cagayan Valley Atheneum, UST High School and Letran College and Physical Education teacher at Uson Colleges.

An engaging lecturer known for his anecdotes, Malonso also tried to instill in his students proper manners. And he famously had a temper and did not hold back. On one occasion, a tardy student tried to explain that he had been caught in traffic caused by an airplane landing on the highway. Malonso immediately sent him out of the classroom. Later on the news of the forced landing reached Malonso who allowed the student back.

The perennial tradition for graduating Letranites was to lift the Honda Minica of the Malonso couple from its parking space and deposit it elsewhere. Malonso relied on the security guard to tip him off and usually found his missing vehicle. But one successfully executed prank found him taking public transportation home. The Minica was carried by overenthusiastic students to Sta. Isabel which was blocks away.

Malonso served as two-time National Collegiate Athletic Association president and led the Gymnastics Association of the Philippines from 1963 to 1973. In 1997 he was named part of the Letran Sports Hall of Fame. He also served as the first president of the Metropolitan Basketball Association and secretary-general of the Asian Gymnastics Confederation.

As provisional president of the Philippine Olympic Committee in 1980 Malonso attended the Moscow Olympics which the US had boycotted. He was instrumental in cultivating many a Filipino sports talent, most notable was track-and-field star Lydia Vega.

Frustrated by the lack of funding, equipment, and scientific training, Malonso also deplored Filipino athletes' lapses. He recounted one training session wherein under rain, the Filipinos dashed for cover whereas the other nationalities continued their exercises.

Malonso worked primarily as an educator and dedicated his career to teaching physical education and managing collegiate sports programs.

During weekends, he reported to Camp Crame as a reservist. At JUSMAG, he enjoyed meeting fellow officers over steak dinners. He was finally accorded the rank of lieutenant-colonel.

== Later life and death ==
Upon retirement Malonso was honored by his alma mater Letran which recognized his decades of teaching and coaching. He wrote articles about sports legends like Primitivo 'Tibing' Martinez, Dionisio Calvo, and Caloy Loyzaga. By November 2008, Malonso is writing a book entitled The Malonso Memoirs. (published in January 2009). If the readers were disappointed that the much-anticipated contents were surprisingly tame, they need not look farther than Uring's circumspect editing.

Visited by Letran Alumni Association members in 2010, Malonso was experiencing a lack of appetite and difficulty in remembering names of people.

On May 12, 2013, Malonso died of a lingering illness.He will be remembered for living the Motto of his beloved school--Deus, Patria, Letran.

== Personal life ==
Malonso married fellow Letran educator, Honorata “Uring” Aves Tan. Tan is the aunt of Senator Tito Sotto and Vic Sotto. A religious aspirant, she was advised by the Mother Superior to take college courses at UST in order to enter the convent earlier. There she met and was charmed by the attentions of the varsity athlete.

Tan and Malonso got married in January 4, 1949. They spent their early career in Ateneo de Tugueguerao before returning to Manila. Both opted to teach in San Juan de Letran, Intramuros. He was the professor in Spanish and PE director, while she taught Filipino and Religion. She also held classes at the Far Eastern University.

Their circle of friends included Dominican priests, sports personalities, Letran alumni and former students, journalist and TV host Joe Quirino.

In January 4, 1999 they celebrated their Golden Anniversary at Mary the Queen, San Juan. Reception followed at Kalayaan Hall, Club Filipino. Ten years later, their Diamond Anniversary marked their lifelong devotion to one another.

Their resting place is at Loyola Memorial Park. His epitaph penned by Uring reads, MARIAN DEVOTEE.
