= Nereo Andolong =

Filipino official (1926/27–2001)

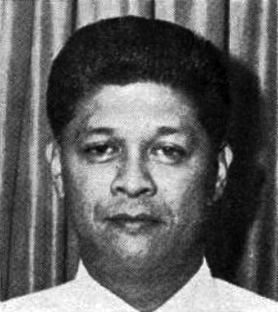

2nd President of the Philippine Olympic Committee
- In office 1977–1980
- Preceded by: Ambrosio Padilla
- Succeeded by: Julian Malonso (provisional)

Personal details
- Born: Nereo C. Andolong; 1926 or 1927
- Died: October 31, 2001 (aged 74)
- Resting place: Manila Memorial Park – Sucat, Parañaque
- Education: University of the Philippines
- Military career
- Allegiance: Philippines
- Branch: Philippine Constabulary
- Rank: Colonel

Nereo Coronel Andolong, also known by his nickname Nering, was a Filipino official, journalist, activist, and sports executive.

Andolong was a member of the Upsilon Sigma Phi fraternity. He served as chairman and general manager of the Philippine Charity Sweepstakes Office. As a journalist, he advocated community journalism and promoted the concerns of province-based journalists. He also served as president of the National Press Club of the Philippines. He also served as a reporter for Manila Chronicle and was awarded the NPC-Stanvac journalism award in 1958 for his work with the media outfit. He also held the rank of colonel at the Philippine Constabulary.

He led various national sports associations such as the Philippine Bowling Congress and later became the president of the Philippine Olympic Committee from 1977 to 1980. He was a sportsman himself playing various sports including bowling, golf, pistol-shooting, sky diving scuba-diving, horse racing, and water skiing.

Andolong retired in the 1980s but remained an enthusiast in golf and other sports. He died at age 74 due to a lingering illness on October 31, 2001 and his remains were interred at the Manila Memorial Park – Sucat in Parañaque.

Andolong received a posthumous award along with seven other sports personalities on January 11, 2002 at the 2001 PSA Annual Awards.

== Early life ==
Andolong grew up in Cotabato City. He left Mindanao to pursue a college education. He studied at the University of the Philippines (UP), and worked as a pin boy in a bowling alley on campus. He was also a member of the Upsilon Sigma Phi fraternity. During his time on campus, he became friends with notable people such as Ninoy Aquino and Estelito Mendoza.

== Journalism career ==
After studying at UP, Andolong returned to Mindanao, where he became a reporter for the Mindanao Cross, a small bi-weekly newspaper. After that stint, he began his career as a reporter for the Manila Chronicle. He started at first as a proofreader, then as a police reporter. He was then assigned to cover Manila City Hall back when the mayor was Arsenio Lacson, who he developed a friendship with. Later on, he also served as president of the National Press Club of the Philippines, and was awarded the NPC-Stanvac journalism award in 1958 for being an advocate of community journalism.

== Political and military career ==
When Ferdinand Marcos became president, Andolong was appointed chairman and general manager of the Philippine Charity Sweepstakes Office. During his term, he used the funds to support welfare operations of local governments and agencies, as well as funding sports programs. He also conceived and organized the Presidential Gold Cup horse race, one of the most prestigious horse racing events in the country. He also held the rank of colonel at the Philippine Constabulary.

In 1992, Andolong served as the public relations adviser to Vice President Salvador Laurel for a brief while.

== Involvement in sports ==
Andolong was a sportsman himself, playing various sports including bowling, golf, pistol-shooting, sky diving, scuba-diving, horse racing, and water skiing. He led seven national sports associations including the Philippine Bowling Congress, shooting, and golf, among others. He was elected president of the Philippine Olympic Committee (POC) from 1977 to 1980. He took over from Ambrosio Padilla, and was succeeded by Julian Malonso. In his term, the country did not win any Olympic medal. In 1994, he served as chairman of the POC screening committee for the 1994 Asian Games, sending 97 athletes to the Asiad. Three athletes won a gold medal, giving the Philippines a 13th place finish in that event.

Andolong was also the chairman of the organizing committee of the 1981 SEA Games. He then transitioned to become honorary chairman of the SEAG Federation Council. When the 1991 SEA Games were being considered for postponement due to the Gulf War and several calamities, he was one of the leading voices for pushing the games through, until President Cory Aquino declared that the games would go on.

== Personal life ==
Andolong married Florita "Arit" Pinga. They had many children, including journalist Popong Andolong, and actress Sandy Andolong.

Andolong was a smoker until he died. During the 90s, he suffered from a heart ailment and in 1993, underwent a successful heart bypass.

== Death ==
Andolong died at age 74 due to a lingering illness on October 31, 2001 and his remains were interred at the Manila Memorial Park – Sucat in Parañaque. He received a posthumous award along with seven other sports personalities on January 11, 2002 at the 2001 PSA Annual Awards. In 2021, Upsilon Sigma Phi honored him during its UNO awards.
