= Handball at the 2021 SEA Games – Women's tournament =

Women's Handball at the 2021 SEA Games
- Dates: 15–21 May 2022
- Nations: 3

Medalists
gold medal	Vietnam
silver medal	Thailand

Women's handball tournament at 31st SEA Games took place in Bac Ninh Sport University Indoor Stadium, Bac Ninh from 15 to 21 May 2022.

Follow the rule, third-place team wouldn't get the bronze medal.

== Team participate ==
- Vietnam
- Thailand
- Singapore

== Result ==
Pos	Team	Pld	W	D	L	GF	GA	GD	Pts
1	Vietnam	4	4	0	0	146	100	+46	8
2	Thailand	4	2	0	2	127	106	+21	4
3	Singapore	4	0	0	4	70	137	−67	0

Source: SEA Games

All times at UTC+7

15 May 2021; 15:00	Singapore	17–32	Vietnam	Bắc Ninh Sport University Hall; Referees: Jullawong, Jullawong (THA)
15 May 2021; 15:00	Wan 4	(6–16)	Đỗ Thị Như Quỳnh 5	Bắc Ninh Sport University Hall; Referees: Jullawong, Jullawong (THA)
15 May 2021; 15:00	2× (suspension)	Report	2× (suspension)	Bắc Ninh Sport University Hall; Referees: Jullawong, Jullawong (THA)

16 May 2021; 15:00	Thailand	34–13	Singapore	Bắc Ninh Sport University Hall; Referees: Lee, Lee (KOR)
16 May 2021; 15:00	Wichaisang 10	(14–9)	three players 2	Bắc Ninh Sport University Hall; Referees: Lee, Lee (KOR)
16 May 2021; 15:00	2× (yellow card) 3× (suspension)	Report	3× (suspension)	Bắc Ninh Sport University Hall; Referees: Lee, Lee (KOR)

17 May 2021; 15:00	Vietnam	40–30	Thailand	Bắc Ninh Sport University Hall; Referees: Lee, Lee (KOR)
17 May 2021; 15:00	Đỗ Thị Huyền Trà 9	(17–15)	Wichaisang 11	Bắc Ninh Sport University Hall; Referees: Lee, Lee (KOR)
17 May 2021; 15:00	5× (suspension)	Report	1× (suspension)	Bắc Ninh Sport University Hall; Referees: Lee, Lee (KOR)

19 May 2021; 15:00	Vietnam	35–26	Singapore	Bắc Ninh Sport University Hall; Referees: Jullawong, Jullawong (THA)
19 May 2021; 15:00	Hà Thị Hạnh, Nguyễn Thị Ánh Tuyết 8	(21–13)	Wan, Chan 6	Bắc Ninh Sport University Hall; Referees: Jullawong, Jullawong (THA)
19 May 2021; 15:00	1× (suspension)	Report		Bắc Ninh Sport University Hall; Referees: Jullawong, Jullawong (THA)

20 May 2021; 15:00	Singapore	14–36	Thailand	Bắc Ninh Sport University Hall; Referees: Nguyễn, Đặng (VIE)
20 May 2021; 15:00	Teo 4	(4–20)	Sripho, Saisod 5	Bắc Ninh Sport University Hall; Referees: Nguyễn, Đặng (VIE)
20 May 2021; 15:00	2× (suspension)	Report	2× (suspension)	Bắc Ninh Sport University Hall; Referees: Nguyễn, Đặng (VIE)

21 May 2021; 15:00	Thailand	27–39	Vietnam	Bắc Ninh Sport University Hall; Referees: Lee, Lee (KOR)
21 May 2021; 15:00	Saisod 9	(17–20)	three players 7	Bắc Ninh Sport University Hall; Referees: Lee, Lee (KOR)
21 May 2021; 15:00	1× (red card)	Report	2× (suspension)	Bắc Ninh Sport University Hall; Referees: Lee, Lee (KOR)
