= Romy Guevarra =

Filipino basketball referee (1936/1937–2026)

Personal information
- Born: 1936 or 1937
- Died: June 16, 2026 (aged 89)
- Position: Referee

Romeo "Romy" Guevarra (1936 or 1937 – June 16, 2026) was a Filipino basketball referee.

== Career ==
Romy Guevarra started his career as a basketball referee at the Manila Industrial and Commercial Athletic Association. He then became a referee in the Philippine Basketball Association, introducing the three-referee system in the league. He officiated in the PBA for 14 years.

He also officiated in the Philippine Basketball League where he was named best referee for two consecutive years and in the Philippines' two major collegiate leagues–the University Athletic Association of the Philippines and the National Collegiate Athletic Association.

Guevarra also noted to have officiated the final of the women's basketball tournament of the 1978 Asian Games. Guevarra was a supervisor for the Qatar Basketball Federation for six years in the 1980s.

He officiated in around 3,000 games and supervised around 17,000 matches both domestically and internationally.

== Death ==
Guevarra died on June 16, 2026, at the age of 89.

== Honors ==
Guevarra was conferred the Lifetime Achievement Award at the 2026 PSA Annual Awards.
