= Oliver Ongtawco =

Filipino bowler (1941–2020)

Personal information
- Full name: Oliver Opeda Ongtawco
- Nickname: Ollie
- Born: June 25, 1941
- Died: June 8, 2020 (aged 78)
- Years active: 1970s–1980s

Sport
- Country: Philippines
- Sport: Bowling
Medal record
Representing Philippines
Men's Bowling
World Tenpin Bowling Championships
Gold medal – first place	1979 Quezon City	Singles
Silver medal – second place	1983 Caracas	Trios
Southeast Asian Games
Silver medal – second place	1983 Singapore	Trios

Oliver "Ollie" Opeda Ongtawco (born June 25, 1941; died June 8, 2020) was a Filipino bowler who represented the Philippines in international tournaments from the 1970s to the 1980s. He was the gold medalist of the men's single event of the 1979 FIQ WTBA World Tenpin Bowling Championships held at the Celebrity Sports Plaza in Quezon City out-besting Rogelio Felice of Venezuela. He also clinched the silver medal in the 1983 edition of the same event in Caracas, Venezuela in the trio event with Paeng Nepomuceno and Rauel Reformado and was also a participant of 1975 World Cup in Makati.

He was named 1979 Philippine Sportswriters Association Bowler of the Year.

Ongtawco studied at the Colegio de San Juan de Letran.

He died on June 8, 2020, at age 78 due to a heart attack.

== Coaching career ==
Ollie served as national team coach. He received government incentives both as player and coach.
