= Philippine Handball Federation =

Governing body of handball in the Philippines

Philippine Handball Federation PHF
- IOC nation: Philippines
- Sport: Handball
- Other sports: Beach Handball; Wheelchair Handball

Affiliations
- International federation: International Handball Federation (IHF)
- IHF member since: 1990
- Continental association: Asian Handball Federation
- National Olympic Committee: Philippine Olympic Committee

Governing Body
- President: Jay Adalem
- Address: C5, Ugong, Pasig
- Country: Philippines
- Secretary General: Charlie Ho

The Philippine Handball Federation is the national governing body for handball in the Philippines.

== History ==
The Philippine Handball Federation is listed to have been accredited by the International Handball Federation since 1990.

The PHF became a voting member of the Philippine Olympic Committee in 2011. The federation has been fielding a women's beach handball team as early as the 2012 Asian Beach Games

== National teams ==
- Men's national handball team
- Women's national handball team
- Men's national beach handball team
- Women's national beach handball team

== Presidents ==
- Steve Hontiveros (2010s–2026)
- Jay Adalem (2026–present)
