= B.League Manila Games 2026 =

- Event logo
- Event: Pre-season exhibition games
| Levanga Hokkaido | Gunma Crane Thunders |
| Head coach: Torsten Loibl | Head coach: Kyle Milling |

First game
| Levanga Hokkaido | Gunma Crane Thunders |
|---|---|
| 81 | 98 |
- Date: 9 September 2026
- Venue: SM Mall of Asia Arena, Pasay, Philippines
- Network: YouTube (Japan)

Second game
| Gunma Crane Thunders | Levanga Hokkaido |
|---|---|
| 101 | 91 |
- Gunma wins in overtime
- Date: 10 September 2026
- Venue: SM Mall of Asia Arena, Pasay, Philippines

The B.League Manila Games 2026 (B.LEAGUE マニラゲーム 2026) was a two-game basketball exhibition event by the B.League of Japan. It was held on 9 and 10 September 2026 at the Mall of Asia Arena in Pasay, Metro Manila.

Held in the Philippines, the series is the first ever games between two teams of the B.League outside Japan. The Gunma Crane Thunders won both games against the Levanga Hokkaido.

== Background ==
The B.League Manila Games 2026 was first announced on 21 May 2026 in a press conference at the SM Megamall in Mandaluyong by officials of the Japan B.League. The venture is supported by the Samahang Basketbol ng Pilipinas and the Philippine Basketball Association, with support from the Embassy of Japan in the Philippines.

The Levanga Hokkaido and Gunma Crane Thunders were to play two games against each other on 9 and 10 September 2026 at the SM Mall of Asia Arena in Pasay. Both teams were selected for having Philippine national team players in their roster; Dwight Ramos for Levanga and A. J. Edu for the Crane Thunders. The Philippines is a popular overseas market, with the basketball organization citing a June 2025 survey that the B.League garnering 65.5 percent recognition in the Philippines.

This was the first time two clubs of the B.League played in games outside Japan with the sanction of the league management.

The games were held in commemoration of the 70th anniversary of the diplomatic relationship of the normalization of the Japan–Philippines relations and the 10th anniversary of the B.League.

Games will be streamed in Japan through the B.League's YouTube channel.

== Venue ==
| Pasay, Philippines | Venue of the B.League Manila Games 2026 |
|---|---|
| SM Mall of Asia Arena | Venue of the B.League Manila Games 2026 |
| Capacity: 15,000 | Venue of the B.League Manila Games 2026 |

== Games ==
The Levanga Hokkaido and Gunma Crane Thunders played against each other twice on 9 and 10 September 2026 at the SM Mall of Asia Arena in Pasay. Tip-off for both games were scheduled at 19:00 (UTC+8).

9 September 2026
19:00 (UTC+8)

Report

Levanga Hokkaido 81, Gunma Crane Thunders 98
Scoring by quarter: 19-29, 21–25, 20–27, 17–21
| Pts: Tominaga 19 | Pts: McKinney-Jones 23 |

SM Mall of Asia Arena, Pasay

10 September 2026
19:00 (UTC+8)

Report

Levanga Hokkaido 91, Gunma Crane Thunders 101 (OT)

SM Mall of Asia Arena, Pasay

== Rosters ==
Note: Flags indicate national team eligibility at FIBA-sanctioned events. Players may hold other non-FIBA nationalities not displayed.

=== Levanga Hokkaido ===
Levanga Hokkaido roster
Players
Coaches

| Pos. | No. | Nat. | Name | Ht. | Age |
|---|---|---|---|---|---|
| G/F | 1 | (Japan) | Kohei Sekino | 1.83 m (6 ft 0 in) | 32 – 1 August 1994 |
| G/F | 2 | (Philippines) | Dwight Ramos | 1.93 m (6 ft 4 in) | 28 – 2 September 1998 |
| F | 3 | (United States) | Gary Clark | 2.00 m (6 ft 7 in) | 31 – 16 November 1994 |
| G/F | 6 | (Japan) | Hiroto Kikuchi | 1.78 m (5 ft 10 in) | 24 – 5 October 2001 |
| F/C | 7 | (Indonesia) | Marques Bolden | 2.11 m (6 ft 11 in) | 28 – 17 April 1998 |
| F | 11 | (Japan) | Yu Kibayashi | 2.00 m (6 ft 7 in) | 24 – 30 March 2002 |
| G | 12 | (Japan) | Shuto Ichiba | 1.87 m (6 ft 2 in) | 23 – 14 February 2003 |
| G | 15 | (Japan) | Ren Shimatani | 1.75 m (5 ft 9 in) | 26 – 28 July 2000 |
| G | 16 | (Japan) | Yuta Osaki | 1.77 m (5 ft 10 in) | 32 – 1 June 1994 |
| F | 18 | (Japan) | Teruchika Naito | 1.91 m (6 ft 3 in) | 20 – 11 January 2006 |
| F/C | 21 | (United States) | John Harrar | 2.05 m (6 ft 9 in) | 27 – 13 July 1999 |
| G/F | 24 | (Japan) | Hiroki Matsuzaki | 1.92 m (6 ft 4 in) | 26 – 2 June 2000 |
| G | 30 | (Japan) | Keisei Tominaga | 1.88 m (6 ft 2 in) | 25 – 1 February 2001 |
| G/F | 40 | (Japan) | Yuma Nishimura | 1.92 m (6 ft 4 in) | 19 – 24 April 2007 |

Head coach

(Germany) Torsten Loibl

Legend

- (C) Team captain
- Injured

- Roster
Updated: 9 September 2026

=== Gunma Crane Thunders ===
Gunma Crane Thunders roster
Players
Coaches

| Pos. | No. | Nat. | Name | Ht. | Age |
|---|---|---|---|---|---|
| G | 0 | (Japan) | Yuma Fujii | 1.78 m (5 ft 10 in) | 34 – 23 December 1991 |
| G | 1 | (Japan) | Koh Flippin | 1.88 m (6 ft 2 in) | 30 – 20 May 1996 |
| G | 4 | (United States) | Trey McKinney-Jones | 1.96 m (6 ft 5 in) | 36 – 27 August 1990 |
| F | 6 | (Japan) | Takuto Nakamura | 1.84 m (6 ft 0 in) | 25 – 3 March 2001 |
| F/C | 8 | (United States) | Kerry Blackshear Jr. | 2.08 m (6 ft 10 in) | 29 – 28 January 1997 |
| G | 9 | (Japan) | Naoto Tsuji | 1.85 m (6 ft 1 in) | 37 – 8 September 1989 |
| F | 14 | (United States) | Stanley Johnson | 1.85 m (6 ft 1 in) | 30 – 29 May 1996 |
| F/C | 15 | (Philippines) | AJ Edu | 2.08 m (6 ft 10 in) | 26 – 1 January 2000 |
| F | 16 | (Japan) | Kenny Asano | 1.98 m (6 ft 6 in) | 24 – 16 August 2002 |
| G/F | 28 | (Japan) | Keita Tsurumaki | 1.90 m (6 ft 3 in) | 30 – 24 April 1996 |
| G | 29 | (Japan) | Kazuki Hosokawa | 1.87 m (6 ft 2 in) | 28 – 17 November 1997 |
| F/C | 55 | (Japan) | Daichi Taniguchi | 2.01 m (6 ft 7 in) | 36 – 15 April 1990 |

Head coach

(United States) Kyle Milling

Legend

- (C) Team captain
- Injured

- Roster
Updated: 9 September 2026
