= Philippines men's national handball team =

Philippines

Information
- Association: Philippine Handball Federation

Colours
1st	2nd
- Last updated on Unknown.

The Philippines national handball team represents the Philippines in international men's handball competitions and is governed by the Philippine Handball Federation.

== Background ==
The Philippines national handball team is known to have taken part at the 2025 Southeast Asian Men's Indoor Handball Championship where the team finished last at fifth place.

A squad was formed from the beach handball team and new players for the men's handball competition of the 2025 SEA Games in Thailand.

== Competitive record ==
=== SEA Games ===
Games	Round	Position	Pld	W	D	L	GF	GA	GD
2021 Vietnam	did not enter								
2025 Thailand	to be determined								
Total	1/2	0 Titles	0	0	0	0	0	0	0
