= Singapore women's national handball team =

Singapore

Information
- Association: Handball Federation Singapore
- Coach: Ko Tsz Yan

Colours
1st	2nd

Results

Asian Championship
- Appearances: 3 (First in 2018)
- Best result: 8th (2024)
- Last updated on Unknown.

The Singapore women's national handball team is the national team of Singapore. It is governed by the Handball Federation Singapore and takes part in international handball competitions.

== Asian Championship record ==
- 2018 – 9th
- 2021 – 9th
- 2024 – 8th
