= Evelyn Lim =

Dr. Evelyn Lim is the founding dean of the Singapore Chapter of the American Guild of Organists. She has been a key driver behind the renaissance of organ music, both sacred and secular, in Singapore.

== Education, awards and recognition ==
Lim holds the Bachelor's and Master's of Music in both Organ and Piano Performance from the University of Houston, and the Doctor of Musical Arts degree from the University of Michigan. She has previously received awards including the American Guild of Organists (Houston) Memorial Prize in Organ Performance, the Power Performing Arts Award (1995) and the Palmer Christian Award, and was a finalist at the Jean and Staley Brodus hymn playing competition in Houston.

Her notable teachers include Marilyn Mason and Robert Jones (organ), Michele Johns (church music), Betty Ruth Tomforhrde (piano), Edward Parmentier (harpsichord) and John Sharpley (piano, Singapore).

== Career ==
=== Organist ===
Besides being the pipe organ master at Singapore's state of the art Esplanade - Theatres on the Bay, she also performs both locally and internationally. Lim also frequently collaborates with the Singapore Symphony Orchestra and Victoria Concert Hall for musical outreach projects and concert programming.

As a freelance solo and collaborative musician, she has performed with the Singapore Symphony Orchestra, the Singapore Symphony Chorus, the Malaysian Philharmonic Orchestra, and various orchestras and choral groups. Lim also founded the Celebration Chorus in 2000, then directed by Tom Anderson.

Lim currently combines a busy schedule of teaching, performing, organising concerts and workshops, giving pipe organ demonstrations, musical outreach projects, as well as playing at church services.

=== Teaching positions ===
Music education has always been a major part of Lim's career, and is where her professional focus lies. In 1997, she accepted an offer to join the full time faculty of the-then fledgling Methodist School of Music to train church organists. The School has since become known as a major centre for organists' education in Singapore. Lim has also served as a part-time organ tutor at the Nanyang Academy of Fine Arts; at the Singapore Bible College where she taught organ and music history; and presently at Dulwich College, Singapore.
