= 2005 SEA Games =

Multi-sport event in the Philippines

XXIII Southeast Asian Games
- Host city: Manila, Philippines
- Motto: One Heritage, One Southeast Asia (or One ASEAN, One Heritage)
- Nations: 11
- Athletes: 5336
- Events: 443 in 40 sports
- Opening: 27 November 2005
- Closing: 5 December 2005
- Opened by: Gloria Macapagal Arroyo; President of the Philippines
- Athlete's Oath: Mikaela "Mikee" Cojuangco-Jaworski
- Judge's Oath: Caesar Mateo
- Torch lighter: Maria Antoinette Rivero
- Ceremony venue: Quirino Grandstand, Rizal Park
- Website: 2005 Southeast Asian Games

The 2005 Southeast Asian Games, officially known as the 23rd Southeast Asian Games, were a Southeast Asian multi-sport event held in Manila, Philippines.

This was the third time the Philippines hosted the games and its first time since 1991. Previously, Philippines also staged the games for the first time in 1981. Around 5336 athletes from 11 participating nations participated at the games which featured 443 events in 40 sports. The games was held from 27 November to 5 December 2005, although several events had commenced from 20 November 2005. The games was opened and closed by Gloria Macapagal-Arroyo, the President of the Philippines at the Quirino Grandstand, Rizal Park.

The final medal tally was led by host Philippines, followed by Thailand and Vietnam. Several Games and national records were broken during the games. Though there were several controversies, the games were deemed generally successful with the rising standard of competition amongst the Southeast Asian Nations.

14 years after the 2005 SEA Games, the Philippines hosted the 2019 edition of the Southeast Asian Games, which was decentralized with no designated host city. Although this edition was also held in different venues in the Philippines, Manila is officially designated as the host city.

== Organisation ==
=== Development and preparation ===
The Philippine SEA Games Organising Committee (PhilSOC) was formed to oversee the staging of the games.

=== Venues ===
Host cities / provinces of the 2005 Southeast Asian Games (Luzon).
Host cities / provinces of the 2005 Southeast Asian Games (Visayas).

The 23rd Southeast Asian Games had 38 venues for the games, 19 in Manila, 5 each in Cebu and Negros Occidental respectively, 4 in Zambales, 2 each in Cavite and Laguna respectively and 1 in Pampanga

City	Competition Venue	Sports
Manila	Emilio Aguinaldo College	Arnis, Wushu
Manila	Rizal Memorial Sports Complex	Athletics, Baseball, Gymnastics, Table tennis, Tennis
Manila	Diosdado Macapagal Boulevard	Athletics (Marathon)
Manila	PhilSports Arena	Badminton
Manila	Makati Coliseum	Billiards and snooker
Manila	Makati Sports Club	Squash
Manila	GSIS Theater	Bodybuilding, Muay
Manila	Pearl Bowling Center	Bowling
Manila	Roxas Boulevard	Cycling: Criterium
Manila	Amoranto Velodrome	Cycling: Track
Manila	Alabang Country Club	Equestrian
Manila	Pasig Sports Center	Fencing
Manila	Marikina Sports Complex	Football
Manila	La Mesa Ecopark	Rowing, Traditional boat race
Manila	PNSA Clay Target Range	Shooting (Trap and skeet)
Manila	PSC-PNSA Shooting Range BNS Fort Bonifacio	Shooting (Air Pistol, Rifle, Practical)
Manila	Rosario Sports Complex	Softball
Manila	Cuneta Astrodome	Taekwondo
Manila	San Andres Gymnasium	Wrestling
Cebu	Ramon M. Durano Sports Complex	Cycling (Mountain)
Cebu	Waterfront Hotel	Dancesport
Cebu	Mandaue Coliseum	Judo, Karate
Cebu	Cebu Coliseum	Pencak silat
Cebu	University of San Carlos	Sepak takraw
Bacolod	University of St. La Salle	Boxing
Bacolod	Paglaum Sports Complex	Football
Bacolod	Panaad Stadium	Football
Bacolod	Luxur Place	Weightlifting
Bacolod	West Negros University	Volleyball
Olongapo	Remy Baseball Field	Archery
Olongapo	Malawaan Fishing Area Subic Bay Freeport Zone	Canoeing
Olongapo	Subic Bay Yacht Club	Sailing
Olongapo	Boardwalk	Triathlon
Tagaytay	Tagaytay City Convention Center	Chess
Tagaytay	Tagaytay	Cycling (Road)
Laguna	Trace College Los Baños	Aquatics
Laguna	The Country Club	Golf
Pampanga	Hidden Vale Sports Club	Lawn bowls, Pétanque

=== Torch relay ===
A ceremony was held in Hanoi, Vietnam, the host of the 2003 Southeast Asian Games to pass the flame to 2005 edition's host, the Philippines. After the flame arrived in Cebu, it passed through several cities in the Philippines before it ended in Manila on 27 November 2005.

== Marketing ==
Gilas, the Philippine eagle, is the official mascot of the Games.

=== Logo ===
The logo of the 2005 Southeast Asian Games dubbed as the "Ethnic-Masked Athlete" which features an athlete wearing a gold festival mask, similar to those found in most Southeast Asian countries, and a headgear. The mask is meant to signify the different countries that gather together for the games as well as the exuberant spirit and hospitality of the Filipinos. The logo also was made to represent the athlete's mixed emotions in participating in the sporting event; pain, suffering, and anxiety which are downplayed by friendship and sportsmanship. The logo was inspired by the MassKara Festival held annually in Bacolod, one of the satellite venues of the event. The logo was designed by Filipino freelance graphic designer Joel Manalastas.

=== Mascot ===
The mascot of the 2005 Southeast Asian Games is a Philippine eagle named Gilas. The Philippine eagle is one of the world's largest eagles, distinct for its majestic plumage on its head. The eagle is a symbol of elegance, strength and pride and winning spirit of the athletes. Gilas was inspired by the Filipino words Maliksi (agile), Malakas (strong), Matalino (smart), Mataas (high), and Matalas (sharp). The SEA Games mascot was originally a Philippine tarsier until the Philippine SEA Games Organising Committee (PhilSOC) changed it to the Philippine eagle. The SEA Games mascot Gilas was designed by Filipino sportswriter/columnist Danny Simon.

=== Songs ===
The theme of the games was "One Heritage, One Southeast Asia". Highlighted during the games' opening ceremony, the theme emphasises unity and co-operation among the 11 member nations of the SEA Games Federation.

The official hymn was "We're All Just One." The hymn was composed by singer-composer Jose Mari Chan and lyricist Rene Nieva. It was sung by Julia Abueva, granddaughter of Philippine national artist Napoleon Abueva, and University of the Philippines President Dr. Emerlinda R. Roman. She was accompanied by the San Miguel Philharmonic Orchestra under the baton of Maestro Ryan Cayabyab.

=== Sponsors ===
A total of 27 sponsors sponsored the games.

- Nestle Milo
- Philippine Long Distance Telephone Company
- Globe Handyphone
- FBT
- Summit Drinking Water
- Microsoft
- Pinoy Stamps
- Yonex
- FedEx
- Revicon Forte
- Thunder Power Drink
- Ison Info Systems
- Philippine National Oil Company
- Cebgo
- Century Park Hotel
- Copylandia
- Molten
- Hapee
- Philippine Airlines
- Philippine Charity Sweepstakes Office
- Mabuhay Satellite Corporation
- Gatorade
- Canon Inc.
- Philips
- Glocal Media Networks
- Sports Central
- The SM Store

== The games ==
=== Opening ceremony ===
The opening ceremonies of the games were held at the Quirino Grandstand in Manila; the first time a park was utilised instead of a stadium which set a record for the world's largest live audience in an opening ceremony with 200,000 people. By doing so, it brought down costs, alleviating the need to spend millions of pesos just to upgrade existing facilities. It also accommodated audiences and is considered large in an opening ceremony, bigger than the openers of the Olympic Games. Among the audiences were the Moro Islamic Liberation Front (MILF), the Philippines' largest Islamic separatist group which sent representatives to attend the opening ceremonies as spectators. Renowned director Maria Montelibano was in charge of the overall program direction, while Ryan Cayabyab and Robert Tongco were in charge of musical and dance direction, respectively. Creative director Pogs Mendoza and assistant director Bebot Pondevida designed the stage. For the first time in the history of the Southeast Asian Games, the opening ceremony was held in an open-air location.

The Games opening started with the parade and entrance of the Philippine flag, carried by members of the Boy Scouts of the Philippines. Following the flag were Boy Scouts of the Philippines and Girl Scouts of the Philippines from Sienna College and some of the host country's best athletes and SEA Games alumni, basketball star Allan Caidic, sprinter Lydia de Vega-Mercado, boxer Mansueto "Onyok" Velasco, swimmer Akiko Thomson, sharpshooter Nathaniel "Tac" Padilla, taekwondo star Monsour del Rosario, equestrian champion Mikee Cojuangco-Jaworski, bowler Paeng Nepomuceno and world boxing champion Manny Pacquiao. The now defunct San Miguel Philharmonic Orchestra and the San Miguel Master Chorale, under the baton of Maestro Ryan Cayabyab, rendered "Sabihin Mo Ikaw Ay Pilipino" during the parade and entrance of the Philippine flag, and then the Philippine National Anthem during the flag raising ceremony. After the national anthem, a colourful cultural dance was presented by the world-renowned Bayanihan Dance Troupe and Jocson Tribe groups.

Leading the athletes was the SEA Games Federation Flag, carried by champion swimmer Eric Buhain, sprint queen Elma Muros-Posadas, badminton player Weena Lim, Mansueto Velasco, Monsour del Rosario and Paeng Nepomuceno. Brunei Darussalam led the Parade of Nations. After the entry of the delegation of Vietnam, Ati-Atihan dancers performed on stage and a large Philippine flag was unfurled by the volunteers from Gawad Kalinga to welcome Team Philippines, who wore stylized red and blue royal blue ramie linen barongs and salakot (A traditional wide-brimmed hat made of indigenous fibers, which is common in the region.) designed by international designer, Eric Pineda. Team Philippines was accompanied by then-Miss International 2005, Precious Lara Quigaman, then-WBC Lightweight Champion, Manny Pacquiao and local celebrity, Angel Locsin. Throughout the parade, the Orchestra and the Chorale provided the score. Each of the participating countries were honored when each of the flag bearers waived their colours in front of the stage one by one, a first in the opening ceremonies of the games. After the parade of nations, the San Miguel Philharmonic Orchestra and the San Miguel Master Chorale performed the SEA Games Overture to welcome the athletes. Bayang Barrios led the colorful song and dance number, "Ang Alamat ng Timog Silangan" ("The Legend of the Southeast"), signifying the theme for the games, "One Heritage, One Southeast Asia." The ten-minute number featured the talents of the Bayanihan Dance Troupe, Hot Legs and various volunteer dancers from different schools around the country. The number ended with a presentation of dances from different Southeast Asian countries and the entrance of the flags of the participating nations, to the delight of the crowd and the athletes.

Southeast Asian Games Federation Chairman and Philippine Olympic Committee President Jose Cojuangco then gave a keynote speech aimed to inspiring athletes to perform their best in their events states that the host country is not just aspiring to win as many medals as it could but to show its good hospitality among its guests. Despite his removal as chairman of the Philippine SEA Games Organizing Committee three months ago, Roberto Pagdanganan was given the task of introducing the guest of honour, President Gloria Macapagal Arroyo who entered the stage and formally declared the games open. To signify the opening of the games, fireworks lit the sky, and the SEA Games Flag was raised. Mikee Cojuangco-Jaworski led the oath of sportsmanship and Cesar Mateo, the pledge for officiating judges. Singapore-based Filipino singer, Julia Abueva sang the theme, "We're All Just One," composed by Jose Mari Chan and written by Rene Nieva. Equestrienne Toni Leviste, riding a horse, carried the torch in front of the Rizal Monument before passing it to Olympian Maria Antoinette Rivero. The flame came all the way from Vietnam, host of the previous games, while the torch came from the last Asian Games in Busan. Rivero then crossed the Roxas Boulevard by parting the crowd all the way to the Grandstand stage. She lit a small cauldron, extinguishing the torch. Then, the flame made its way to the large cauldron, signaling the start of the games. The opening ceremony ended with a 45-minute concert. Local band Rivermaya, together with the San Miguel Philharmonic Orchestra, played the SEA Games song, "Posible," which inspired athletes that a medal win is possible. A fireworks display was on show during the performance.

=== Closing ceremony ===
The closing ceremony of the Games was held at the Quirino Grandstand on 5 December at 20:00 PST.

The ceremony began with songs and dance performances by local artists and performers, followed by the parade of athletes by order of sports competed at the games. After President Gloria Macapagal Arroyo gave her speech, she declared the 23rd Southeast Asian games closed. The flame of the games' cauldron was extinguished and the Federation flag was lowered. Mike Arroyo, the Head of Mission of Team Philippines was accompanied by Philippine Olympic Committee (POC) president Jose 'Peping' Cojuangco Jr. to handed over the SEA Games Federation flag to Thailand's Deputy Prime Minister, Suwat Liptapanlop, a symbol of the SEA Games responsibilities being handed over to Thailand, host of the 2007 Southeast Asian Games. The Thai National Anthem was played as the National flag of Thailand was raised. A Thailand segment performance was performed by Thai dancers, who graced the stage to provide spectators with a glimpse of what the athletes would expect in Nakhon Ratchasima.

The ceremony concluded with a Filipino farewell segment performance, showing the culture of the Philippines.

=== Participating nations ===
All eleven nations in Southeast Asia participated with the Philippines having the largest delegation with 892 athletes as host country.

- Brunei (271)
- Cambodia (108)
- Indonesia (779)
- Laos (102)
- Malaysia (613)
- Myanmar (452)
- Philippines (892) (Host)
- Singapore (658)
- Thailand (780)
- Timor-Leste (29)
- Vietnam (652)

=== Sports ===
The 2005 SEA Games featured 40 sports. The 23rd edition of the games had the highest number of sporting events in the entire history of the SEAG at that time; more events than the Asian Games and the Olympic Games. The Southeast Asian Games Federation, through the recommendation of the Philippine SEA Games Organising Committee (PhilSOC), decided to exclude basketball, a popular sport in the Philippines, from the competitions due to the decision of FIBA to ban the host country to participate in any international competitions of the sport.

- Archery
- Arnis ³
- Aquatics
- Athletics
- Badminton
- Baseball °
- Billiards and snooker ¹
- Bodybuilding ¹
- Boxing
- Bowling ¹
- Canoeing
- Chess ¹
- Cycling
- Dancesport ³
- Equestrian
- Fencing
- Football
- Golf
- Gymnastics
- Judo
- Karate ¹
- Lawn bowls ³
- Muay ²
- Pencak silat ²
- Pétanque ²
- Rowing
- Sailing
- Sepak takraw ¹
- Shooting
- Softball °
- Squash ¹
- Table tennis
- Taekwondo
- Tennis
- Traditional boat race ¹
- Triathlon
- Volleyball
- Weightlifting
- Wrestling
- Wushu ¹

¹ - not an official Olympic Sport
² - sport played only in the SEA Games
³ - not a traditional Olympic nor SEA Games Sport and introduced only by the host country.
° - a former official Olympic Sport, not applied in previous host countries and was introduced only by the host country.

=== Medal table ===
A total of 1462 medals, comprising 444 gold medals, 434 silver medals, and 584 bronze medals were awarded to athletes. The Host Philippines performance was its best ever yet in Southeast Asian Games history, emerged as overall champion of the games.

* Host nation (Philippines)

Rank	Nation	Gold	Silver	Bronze	Total
1	Philippines*	112	85	93	290
2	Thailand	87	79	117	283
3	Vietnam	71	71	86	228
4	Malaysia	61	49	64	174
5	Indonesia	50	78	89	217
6	Singapore	42	32	55	129
7	Myanmar	17	34	48	99
8	Laos	3	3	12	18
9	Brunei	1	4	0	5
10	Cambodia	0	3	9	12
11	Timor-Leste	0	0	3	3
Totals (11 entries)		444	438	576	1,458

== Broadcasting ==
- The Games was broadcast live and uninterrupted in the Philippines, simultaneously by privately owned ABC 5, ABS-CBN and Studio 23, along with the government networks: National Broadcasting Network and the Intercontinental Broadcasting Corporation (both except Radio Philippines Network) that complete the local broadcast pool.
- In Singapore, the games was broadcast on Mediacorp Channel 5, in Thailand by Channel 5 and in Vietnam by VTV Channel 3. Mabuhay Satellite transmitted the ceremony to international broadcasters through the Filipino Aguila 2 satellite.

== Concerns and controversies ==
- The Philippines' decision to scatter the events in multiple cities across the country posed logistical problems for the athletes and officials.
- Thailand protested a boxing decision that favoured the host country to the International Boxing Association (AIBA).
- The 2005 SEA Games website was also criticised for its outdated tally of the medal standings.
- At the Opening Ceremony, President Arroyo was booed by the spectators due to the alleged cheating in the 2004 Philippine general election.
- Venues outside Manila actively prepared for welcoming the visiting athletes, except for organisers in the capital region had numerous problems drumming-up widespread support and exposure for the Games. Among the only visible indications of the Games, apart from the commercial sponsors' advertisements, were the welcome banners put up by the city government.
- Four Vietnamese pencak silat competitors, Nguyen Thi Thu Hong, Nguyen Van Hung, Le Anh Tuan and Nguyen Thi Phuong Thuy won gold medals despite had their schedules changed at the last minute and without due notification by the games organiser to the athletes involved. Nguyen Thi Thu Hong, for instance, discovered the change only by chance, and would have forfeited the game if she did not turn up during the rescheduled time.
- At the opening ceremonies in Cebu City, organizers were impressed over the sell-out crowd of 20,000 spectators. However, city officials were furious over how this was achieved after they discovered that the planning committee for the Cebu opening ceremonies heavily slashed ticket prices from 100 pesos to 20 pesos. Even at P20 per ticket, discounts were given further. Cebu City mayor Tomas Osmeña said that he was disappointed that the sell-out crowd was achieved by selling tickets with "dirt-cheapness" and was also furious over the organizers' overspending for the event.
- In table tennis, the Singaporean delegation, although widely expected to retain their titles, voiced objections over the change of tables used without informing the athletes prior to the competitions, a move that violates international rules.
- In marathon, both male and female athletes were scheduled to run on the same route. The women departed 10 minutes before the men did, which was against the rules. It is provided by the rules that if male and female runners are to be arranged in the same route, the females must depart at least 30 minutes before the males do. Because of this arrangement, this later broke out protest by the Vietnamese team. The judges argued that the Vietnamese male runner, Nguyen Van Khoa, was 'illegally pacing' his female teammate, Nguyen Thi Hoa, from the 28th kilometre to the finish line 'to assist her to win the medal'. Both competitors were disqualified. The Vietnamese team, however, defended that because male runners departure was just only 10 minutes after the females, they must catch up the females somewhere mid-way; and no regulations provide that the male runner must run faster than the female. The marshals' decision however remained unchanged.
- Thailand, through Jaruk Areerajakaran, the secretary-general of Thailand's Olympic Committee, claims that the Philippines was cheating throughout the course of the Games by rigging the results of the events, it being more concerned in winning gold medals rather than the spirit of the games. The scandal even prompted Thai Prime Minister Thaksin Shinawatra to consider bringing up the issue at the upcoming ASEAN summit in Malaysia and/or to hold a summit on fair play during the SEA Games. The Philippines has denied rigging the results of the sports mentioned by Thaksin, which include Aquatics, Athletics and Fencing. One protest filed by the Thai delegation was taken into action immediately after watching the video-finish of the 10,000 meter run. The Filipino winner returned the gold medal in exchange of the silver medal of the Thai runner. In a development of this scandal, Chaiyapak Siriwat, the vice-president of the Thailand Olympic Council, apologized to the Philippines for the report, claiming that it is "inappropriate and baseless". Confirmation is still pending over the comments of the Thai prime minister over his disappointment over the results of the SEA Games. In fact, he (Siriwat) has yet to receive any complaint from the Thai delegation about any judging irregularities. Despite the organizer's denial of rigging the results, President Gloria Macapagal Arroyo ordered an investigation into the controversy raised by Thaksin's remarks about officiating during the Games. The Thai Ministry of Foreign Affairs issued a statement apparently aimed at defusing the controversy, they said that Thaksin did not directly accuse the Philippines of favoring its athletes to win and blamed the media for taking the Prime Minister's remarks "out of context." Thailand's Deputy Prime Minister, Suwat Liptapanlop, arrived 3 December to personally witness the events in the games. After watching a tennis game finals between Thailand and the Philippines (lower seeded Philippines won), Suwat stressed that the Philippines and Thailand "have very good relations" and the controversy won' t destroy diplomatic relations between Philippines and Thailand. He also acknowledge the efforts made by Philippines of hosting the games. The allegations are no longer an issue for the ASEAN summit in Kuala Lumpur as the other nine ASEAN countries and East Timor congratulated the Philippines for its overall win.
- Two Thai aquatics officials have been sanctioned by FINA (International Aquatics Federation) for biased judging. One Thai diving judge was disciplined by the FINA neutral referee from New Zealand for "obviously favoring his own diver". Another Thai referee, in water polo, was banned from the deck because of "intentional bad calls and unfair player exclusions". The referee had the Vietnamese team lose points thus he was never allowed to be on the deck again according to a FINA neutral delegate from Iran.
- An emotional Filipino crowd threw coins into the boxing ring during the men's middleweight finals in Bacolod, forcing the referee to stop the fight in favor of Thai boxer Suriya Prasatinphimai who was leading in the first round. It was not clear what started the commotion, but ring announcers said the home crowd were angry that the judges were not scoring some of the punches being made by Filipino boxer Reynaldo Galido. The allegations nearly sparked riots.
- According to the Philippine Daily Inquirer, in track and field, the Philippine delegation's top distance runner, in a last-ditch attempt to win the gold, blocked the lane of his fast-approaching Thai counterpart. Because of this, he was promptly disqualified.
- After the Philippines lost to Myanmar in the women's sepak takraw final, a team manager immediately filed a protest and requested a gender test of three Myanmar players. The three were subjected to the mandatory doping test. The Philippines withdrew the protest on 4 December as a sign of friendship and sportsmanship. The decision came to defuse any controversy and to show its goodwill as hosts.
- Two Vietnamese men's football players, striker Pham Van Quyen and midfielder Le Quoc Vuong, were arrested in Hanoi for "indulging in betting on games and organising betting" (match-fixing). The scandal apparently took place in a match with Vietnam placed against Myanmar, with Vietnam winning 1–0. However, the results are disputed after allegations rose on state television state that some Vietnamese players appeared to slow down their play. It's also been alleged that Van Quyen received 23 million đồng from two women in Ho Chi Minh City on the way to Hanoi from Manila for the match-fix. Meanwhile, the Philippine government praised Vietnamese officials for the crackdown on football corruption and the arrest of the two players. Philippine Olympic Committee chairman Robert Aventajado said that the arrests were made to protect the sport and that Vietnam is working to stem further damage that the scandal has caused to it. Two more players, midfielder Huynh Quoc Anh and defender Le Bat Hieu, were arrested on the same charges over the same scandal. It is believed that these players also received twenty million đồng from local bookmakers to make sure that Vietnam won't win by more than one goal. The same accusation is also believed to be applied to the 23 million đồng payout to Van Quyen.

== See also ==
- 2005 ASEAN Para Games
- 2019 Southeast Asian Games

Preceded by Hanoi–Ho Chi Minh City	Southeast Asian Games; Manila; XXIII Southeast Asian Games (2005)	Succeeded by Nakhon Ratchasima
