= Bernard Tan =

Bernard Tan may refer to:

- Bernard Tan (composer)
- Bernard Tan (actor)
