= San Miguel Philharmonic Orchestra =

- SMPO logo

Background information
- Origin: Philippines
- Years active: 2001–2007

The San Miguel Philharmonic Orchestra (SMPO) was one of the two major performing arts groups (along with the San Miguel Master Chorale) under the San Miguel Foundation for the Performing Arts. As a young ensemble, its wide selection of works encompassing musical genres attests to its versatility and dynamism. Together with the SMMC, the SMPO aspired to produce and perform new orchestral works that will ensure the growth and development of Filipino music.

The SMPO, together with the San Miguel Master Chorale, was disbanded in late January 2007 by the San Miguel Corporation.

== Disbandment ==
In a swift and silent move, the big bosses of the San Miguel Corporation (SMC) have already disbanded the SMPO and the SMMC. Late January 2007, instrumentalists of the SMPO and SMMC were summoned one by one by the big bosses who informed them of the non-renewal of their contracts. Many of the performers did not get any separation pay. Insider reports say that the SMC was "more inclined" on supporting its four professional basketball teams. No word yet on what happened to Ryan Cayabyab, the SMFPA's Executive and artistic director.

== Discography ==
=== Great Filipino Love Songs ===
The SMPO has been featured in all the existing SMFPA albums to date, but its first solo album, Great Filipino Love Songs (GFLS), was a bestseller in major record bars and a certified gold record, thereby breaking records of sorts when it was released in 2004.

- GFLS was the first locally produced album to feature full-blown orchestral arrangements of well-known Filipino classics. It was produced and recorded in a span of 3 years.
- It emerged as No. 2 album in sales charts upon its release in 2004, and after a week became No. 1, surpassing the sales of contemporary mainstream artists like Usher, Josh Groban, Maroon 5, Beyoncé, and Evanescence.
- According to sales reports, the album has been bought by bulk by many customers as presents and give-aways among families and corporations for all occasions.
- The album earned phenomenal success despite minimal advertising.

Track List:

- Bato sa Buhangin
- Maalaala Mo Kaya
- Ikaw
- Minamahal Kita
- Dahil Sa Iyo
- Hindi Kita Malimot
- Ang Tangi Kong Pag-ibig
- Buhat
- Gaano Ko Ikaw Kamahal
- Ikaw ang Mahal Ko
- Katakataka
- Minamahal, Sinasamba
- Saan Ka Man Naroroon
- Lahat ng Araw

=== Great Original Pilipino Music ===
Created by Ryan Cayabyab. All songs in the album composed and arranged by Ryan Cayabyab. All songs recorded in 2001, except tracks 5, 8, and 9, which are SMMC a capella tracks and were recorded in 2004. This album received three nominations in the 18th Awit Awards aside from winning Best Musical Arrangement for Tuwing Umuulan at Kapiling Ka. Certified Gold Record.

- Tuwing Umuulan at Kapiling Ka (winner, 18th Awit Awards, Best Musical Arrangement)
- Iduyan Mo
- Kahit Ika'y Panaginip Lang
- Paraisong Parisukat
- Tunay na Ligaya
- Nais Ko
- Limandipang Tao
- Tsismis
- Da Coconut Nut
- Iniibig Kita
- Paraiso
- Awit ng Pagsinta (Epithalamium) - from Ryan Cayabyab and Bienvenido Lumbera's pop-ballet Rama Hari; lyrics by Lumbera
- Hibang sa Awit - lyrics by Jose Javier Reyes

=== Pasko I ===
Festive Filipino Christmas classics, all songs arranged & conducted by Ryan Cayabyab and performed by the SMPO and the SMMC. Certified Gold Record.

- Kampana ng Simbahan
- Heto na Naman - music and lyrics by Ryan Cayabyab
- Namamasko
- Tuloy na Tuloy pa rin ang Pasko
- Sa Paskong Darating
- Maligayang Pasko at Manigong Bagong Taon (Ang Pasko ay Sumapit)
- Kumukutikutitap*
- Mano Po Ninong, Mano Po Ninang
- Noche Buena
- Heto na Naman ang Pasko**
- Maligayang Pasko**
- Pasko na Naman

* from Ryan Cayabyab and Jose Javier Reyes's musical Bituin; lyrics by Reyes
** from Ryan Cayabyab and Jose Javier Reyes's musical teleplay Pasko sa Amin; lyrics by Reyes

=== Pasko II ===
Mellow Filipino Christmas classics, all songs arranged & conducted by Ryan Cayabyab and performed by the SMPO and the SMMC. Certified Gold Record. Isang Taong Lumipas won as Best Christmas Song during the 19th Awit Awards.

- Ngayong Pasko*
- Pasko Na Sinta Ko
- Paskong Walang Hanggan*
- Himig Pasko
- Miss Kita Kung Christmas
- Isang Taong Lumipas*
- Ang Aking Pamasko
- Ang Mahalin Ka**
- Anong Gagawin Mo Ngayong Pasko - music and lyrics by Ryan Cayabyab
- Ang Naaalala Ko**
- Munting Sanggol - music and lyrics by Ryan Cayabyab
- Payapang Daigdig

* music by Ryan Cayabyab, lyrics by Jose Javier Reyes
** from Ryan Cayabyab and Jose Javier Reyes's musical teleplay Pasko sa Amin; lyrics by Reyes

=== Spoliarium: The Opera ===
A neo-opera in three acts based on the life of renowned Filipino painter Juan Luna. Music by Ryan Cayabyab, libretto by Fides Cuyugan-Asensio.

=== The Filipino Classics ===
A collection of Filipino classics from the '20s up to the '60s. All songs arranged & conducted by Ryan Cayabyab and performed by Basil Valdez accompanied by the SMPO. Sequel albums 2 and 3 are said to be produced if this first album performs well in the market. This album became No. 1 at Tower Records in one month's time since it was released.

- Diyos Lamang ang Nakakaalam
- Babalik Ka Rin
- Dahil Sa Isang Bulaklak
- Bituing Marikit
- Kung Nagsasayaw Kita
- Madaling Araw
- Sa Ugoy ng Duyan
- Bakas ng Lumipas
- Sapagka't Kami ay Tao Lamang
- Lagi Kitang Naaalala
- Bayan Ko
- Mahiwaga

=== The Sacred Works of Ryan Cayabyab ===
Religious compositions of Cayabyab. Misa was his thesis composition for his graduation at the University of the Philippines College of Music. Misa 2000 was composed for and won as Original Music Composition for Dance in the 2000 Onassis International Cultural Competition in Greece. This album won as Best Religious Album in the 2004 Catholic Mass Media Awards.

Disc 1:

- Misa 2000
  - Kyrie
  - Gloria
  - Credo
  - Sanctus
  - Agnus Dei
- Te Deum

Disc 2:

- Misa
  - Kyrie
  - Gloria
  - Credo
  - Sanctus
  - Agnus Dei
- Aquesta Me Guiaba
- Aba Po, Santa Mariang Reyna
- Anima Christi

=== Beauty and the Beast ===
Songs from the Philippine run of the musical Beauty and the Beast, arranged and conducted by Ryan Cayabyab, performed by the musical's main cast with the SMPO and the SMMC.

- Home (KC Concepcion)
- Beauty and the Beast (show version by Pinky Marquez)
- A Change in Me (KC Concepcion)
- If I Can't Love Her (Jett Pangan)
- Beauty and the Beast (pop version by Luke Mijares)

=== Great Original Pilipino Music from the Movies ===
Famous theme songs from Filipino movies from 1977 to 2002. Recorded live in July 2006 and released December of that year. Mainly featuring the SMMC, accompanied by the SMPO. Choral arrangements by Ryan Cayabyab, Jesus Carlo Merino, Ed Nepomuceno and Nathanael Arnel de Pano (the latter 2 being section leaders of the SMMC Tenors and Basses, respectively), and Eudenice Palaruan (SMMC Principal Conductor). All orchestrations by Ryan Cayabyab.

- Sana'y Wala Nang Wakas
- Kahit Isang Saglit
- Pangako
- Pangarap Na Bituin
- Pagdating Ng Panahon
- Kailangan Kita
- Hanggang Sa Dulo Ng Walang Hanggan
- Kailangan Ko'y Ikaw
- Iduyan Mo - music and lyrics by Ryan Cayabyab, from the movie "Agila" (1980)
- Hanggang Ngayon
- Tanging Yaman
- Sinasamba Kita
- Ikaw Lang Ang Mamahalin
- Gaano Kadalas Ang Minsan
- Paraisong Parisukat - music and lyrics by Ryan Cayabyab, from the movie "Masikip, Maluwang...Paraisong Parisukat" (1977)

=== Dancing in the Rain ===
An album featuring Ryan Cayabyab's talent as a pianist in his own right, accompanied by the SMPO & SMMC. Recorded live in August 2006 and released December of that year. Entire track list composed, arranged, and produced by Ryan Cayabyab.

- First Glance
- Feels Like This Love Affair Is Gonna Last Forever
- Frap For Two On A Beach In Cebu
- Photographs Of You And Me, Together
- Like Children Dancing In The Rain With Nothing On
- Alone, Drenched In The Red, Orange and Gold Of A Manila Sunset
- Grey Clouds! Grey Clouds! Its Beginning To Drizzle
- Its Getting More Difficult To Explain Why I Do Things The Way That I Do
- Almost Sunup And I Haven't Slept
- Last Trip To Boracay
- This Is Beginning To Sound Like An Old Song
- It Isn't The First Time Someone Left Me
- Letting Go
- Last Look

=== Future albums ===
Other music albums are said to be in the pipeline, like:

- A compilation of popular folk songs representative of different regions in the Philippines; e.g., "Atin Cu Pung Singsing," "Usahay, "Ay, Kalisud," and "Sarungbanggi."
- A compilation of popular novelty songs including "Ocho-ocho," "Pito-pito," and possibly "Boom Tarat-Tarat," all to be performed in symphonic style.
