= Lynnette Seah =

Singaporean violinist (born 1957)

Lynnette Seah 佘美幸
- Born: Seah Mei Tsing (Chinese: 佘美幸; pinyin: Shé Měixìng); 1957 (age 67–68); Singapore
- Genres: Classical music
- Occupation(s): violinist, concertmistress
- Instrument: Violin

Lynnette Seah Mei Tsing (Chinese: 佘美幸; pinyin: Shé Měixìng, born 1957) is a Singaporean violinist. She retired after 41 years at the Singapore Symphony Orchestra (SSO) in 2019. She was awarded the Cultural Medallion for Music in 2006.

== Early life ==
Seah began her formal music education on the piano at the age of five under the guidance of her mother, Lau Biau Chin. At six years old, she began learning the violin with Goh Soon Tioe. Subsequently, she studied with violin teacher Alphonso Anthony. At 15, Seah was appointed Associate Concertmaster of the Bishop Symphony Orchestra at the International Music Camp in Adelaide, Australia. In the same year, she represented Singapore in the Southeast Asian Violin Competition and earned a scholarship to study at the Hannover Hochschule for Music in Germany.

Seah received instruction from multiple violin instructors, including David Mankowitz in Toronto, Professor Friedrich von Hausegger in Hanover, Professor Karel Sneberger in Prague, Yfrah Neaman in London, and Dorothy DeLay in New York.

== Musical career ==
As a violin soloist, Seah has performed with several orchestras around the world, such as the Janáček Philharmonic Orchestra, Gstaad Menuhin Festival Orchestra, Orebro Chamber Orchestra, Teplice Symphony Orchestra, and Zurich Symphony Orchestra. Seah has also played in several festivals, including the Bergen International Festival, Singapore Arts Festival, and the Swiss Festival. In 2005, Seah commissioned Singaporean composer Bernard Tan to compose a concerto, Violin Concerto, dedicated to her. The concerto premiered on 7 January 2006 at Singapore's Esplanade Concert Hall by Seah herself with the SSO and Chinese-American conductor Lan Shui.

Seah is active in the chamber music community. She is the leader and founder of the Jade String Quartet, a chamber music group in Singapore, as well as one of the founders of the Singapore Symphony Orchestra.

Seah (center)

Alongside her soloist and concertmaster work, Seah is a member of the Advisory Committee for the "Violin Loan Scheme" run by the Singapore National Arts Council. She is also a member of Singapore's Education Ministry's Arts Education Committee, which oversees various arts institutions such as the Nanyang Academy of Fine Arts, the Yong Siew Toh Conservatory of Music, and the LASALLE College of the Arts.

== Awards ==
In 1997, the Composers and Authors Society of Singapore conferred on Seah the Excellence Award in recognition of her contribution to Singapore's classical music scene.

In 2006, SSO nominated and awarded Seah with the Cultural Medallion for Music. Seah received the award from the then President of Singapore, S R Nathan, at the Istana.

== Personal life ==
Seah is divorced from her husband, Hans Simon. They have two sons.
