= Eudenice Palaruan =

Eudenice V. Palaruan
- Born: 3 July 1968 (age 57); Solano, Nueva Vizcaya, Philippines
- Occupations: Conductor, composer, music educator

Eudenice V. Palaruan is a Filipino conductor, composer, and music educator.

Palaruan is one of the Philippines' most esteemed church musicians in choral music. As a choral artist, he has worked with the Philippines' top groups. His compositions and arrangements are highly sought after.

He taught at the University of the Philippines College of Music in Diliman, Quezon City, and at St. Paul University Manila, and served as the music director at the Greenhills Christian Fellowship and the Union Church of Manila.

He was also involved in early music performance practice as a countertenor with the Berlin Monteverdi Chor in Germany and the Villancico Vocal Ensemble at the International Bamboo Organ Festival in the Philippines. As a conductor, he was a music director of the Ateneo de Manila College Glee Club, assistant choirmaster of the Philippine Madrigal Singers under Andrea Veneracion, principal conductor of the San Miguel Master Chorale and the Union Church of Manila Chancel Choir. He was the resident conductor of the International Bamboo Organ Festival, directing the Philippines’ leading choirs in the performance of early European music and the revival of Latin American baroque music. As a composer and arranger, Palaruan writes contest pieces for choral competitions, including the 2019 Andrea O. Veneracion International Choral Competition in Manila. His composition style uses vocal tapestry by incorporating Asian speech sounds. Some of his widely used works are Gapas (Harvest), Koyu No Tebulul (Bird Song), Pasigin (Fishing Song).

Eudenice is the Choral Director of the Singapore Symphony Chorus since 2017 and is concurrently an associate professor at the School of Church Music in the Singapore Bible College.

== Early life and education ==
Palaruan was born July 3, 1968, in his mother's home town in Solano, Nueva Vizcaya, in the Philippines. He grew up in his father's hometown in Lawig, Lamut, Ifugao, Philippines.

His music training formally began at the Philippine High School for the Arts where he majored in voice under the guidance of Andrea O. Veneracion, and piano under Nena Del Rosario Villanueva. He studied composition under the National Artist Ramon Santos, voice under National Artist Andrea O. Veneracion, and conducting under Joel Navarro graduated with a bachelor's degree in choral conducting at the University of the Philippines College of Music. From 1994 to 1997, he took further studies in conducting pedagogy at the Berliner Kirchenmusikschule in Germany under Martin Behrmann. In 2023, he finished his Doctor of Musical Arts in Choral Conducting at St. Paul University Manila College of Music and the Performing Arts.

== Career ==
Palaruan started taking his first major steps in his career at an early age. In his teenage years, he joined the Philippine Madrigal Singers, eventually becoming an assistant choirmaster. He also performed under Dr. Joel Navarro with the Ateneo College Glee Club where he also became assistant conductor and, from 1991 to 1994, served as music director.

From 1991 to 1993, he taught at the music department at Sta Isabel College.

He became a faculty member at the Asian Institute of Liturgy and Music (AILM) from 1990 to 1993 and 1998 to 2004 when he also handled the AILM Chorale – Asian Ensemble.

In 1992, he joined the World Youth Choir when the group performed in an Olympic Gala at the 1992 Summer Olympics in Barcelona, Spain.

In 2004, he was appointed principal conductor of the San Miguel Master Chorale, the Philippines' first professional choir. Under his direction, the choir performed at the 7th World Symposium on Choral Music (2005) in Kyoto, Japan. In the same critically acclaimed performance, the San Miguel Master Chorale also premiered Palaruan's compositions Gapas and Infaag of a Pundayaw (Praise) series.

== Personal life ==
Eudenice Palaruan is married to Emily Ann Palaruan with whom he has three children.
