= Daniel Schweizer =

Daniel Schweizer (November 6, 1953 – October 29. 2020), founded the Zurich Symphony Orchestra (S-O-Z) after his music study in violin, cello, and directing. He had his debut as a conductor in 1981. Today the S-O-Z belongs to the cultural life of the city Zurich. It survived mainly because the orchestra is able to offer a wide variety of music.

The formation and development of the orchestra has been achieved in his responsibility as chief conductor. He combined musical rarities and contemporary compositions with the classical repertoire of baroque, classical and romantic music. His works, dedicated to the premieres of contemporary composers, won widespread acclaim. Thus he was often invited to collaborate with other professional orchestras in Switzerland.

Daniel Schweizer approached the phenomenon music with a descriptive objectification of tunes. This provided him a conscious base for his praxis to build himself bridges to the various styles of the symphonic. Quintessential point of his criteria for practical conversion was not primarily historical environment, but musical essence.

As of today, the orchestra performs two regular concert series in the Tonhalle in Zurich besides many other performances all around Switzerland and abroad. Daniel Schweizer's international achievements cover concerts at festivals in Spain and Portugal, as well as invitations as guest conductor to orchestras all around the world. A broad range of CD-productions gives proof of his musical activities.

Major orchestras maestro Schweizer conducted are Orchestra Guido Cantelli Milano of Italy, Singapore Symphony Orchestra of Singapore, Seoul Philharmonic Orchestra of Korea and National Symphony Orchestra of Ukraine.

Personal Homepage: http://www.ds-m.com or http://www.danielschweizermusic.com Project Orchestra: http://www.ods-productions.com/
