= Singapore Symphony Chorus =

Choir of the Singapore Symphony Orchestra

The Singapore Symphony Chorus (SSC) is the performing choir of the Singapore Symphony Orchestra (SSO). The SSC performs solely with the SSO, presenting an average of three programmes a year.

The SSC's present chorus master is Eudenice Palaruan, who took over from Lim Yau. Most concerts are performed at Singapore's Esplanade Concert Hall and the Victoria Concert Hall.

The associated youth choirs are the Singapore Symphony Children's Choir (SSCC) and the Symphony Youth Choir (SSYC).

== History ==
In 1980, SSO's Music Director and Conductor, Choo Hoey, started the SSC and gave its first performance in 1980.

== Repertoire and Collaborations ==
The Chorus has performed under the baton of Choo Hoey, Lan Shui, Lim Yau, Okko Kamu, Gilbert Kaplan, Andrea Quinn, Justin Brown, George Cleve, Wang Jin and John Nelson. Vocal soloists that have appeared with the Chorus over the years include Sir Willard White, David Wilson Johnson, Michael George, Neil Mackie, Susan Chilcott and Nathan Berg.

The repertoire of the SSC includes Hindemith’s Requiem, Holst’s The Planets, Lambert’s Rio Grande, Orff’s Carmina Burana, Rachmaninov’s The Bells, Stravinsky’s Symphony of Psalms, Tippett’s A Child of Our Time, and the masses and oratorios of J. S. Bach, Beethoven, Haydn, Mozart, Berlioz, Gounod, Dvořák, Elgar, Fauré, Verdi and Mendelssohn.

The chorus has taken part in opera productions such as Carmen (1990), Cosi fan tutte (1999) and The Other Wise Man (2000), and is a regular feature in the Singapore Arts Festival.

Most recently, the SSC has performed Janáček's Glagolitic Mass (2004), Beethoven’s Symphony No. 9 in D minor "Choral" (2005), Mendelssohn's Elijah (2005), Beethoven’s Missa Solemnis in April 2006 and Haydn's The Creation later in 2006, followed by John Rutter works in the Christmas concert. In 2007, two particular highlights are Seven Last Words from the Cross by James MacMillan and Handel's The Messiah performed without scores!

For first half of 2008, works performed are Mahler's 3rd Symphony, Misa Tango by Luis Bacalov, and later in the year, Brahms Deutsche Requiem. In 2009, the chorus went on to perform Mahler's 2nd Symphony with John Nelson back as guest conductor, and later, under Lan Shui, Haydn's Nelson Mass and Beethoven’s Symphony No. 9 in D minor "Choral" together with the Singapore Symphony Children's Choir. Of special note in 2009 was Damnation of Faust by Berlioz.

In April 2010, the Chorus celebrated its 30th anniversary and invited old members to return to perform Verdi's Requiem - this time in the fantastic Esplanade - Theatres on the Bay, its performing home since 2002.

April 2013 saw the chorus perform Britten's War Requiem, together with the Singapore Bible College Chorale, the Hallelujah Chorus, The Philharmonic Chamber Choir, the NAFA Choir and the Singapore Symphony Children’s Choir.

In November 2017, as part of the SSO's tour to KL, the chorus performed Brahm's Gesang der Parzen and Schicksalslied at Petronas Philharmonic Hall, KL. Joining them on stage were members of the Singapore Symphony Youth Choir and the Transylvania State Philharmonic Choir.

== Chorus Masters ==
- 1980-1981 Susan Ashton
- 1981-1997 Lim Yau
- 1983 William Zimmerman (Caretaker)
- 1997 Robert Casteels (Caretaker)
- 1998-2000 Bart Folse
- 2001-2017 Lim Yau
- 2017- current Eudenice Palaruan
