= Joel P. Navarro =

Filipino-American conductor and music educator

Joel Magus P. Navarro
- Born: January 24, 1955 (age 71)
- Occupations: Conductor; music educator; composer; arranger

Joel Magus P. Navarro (born January 24, 1955) is a Filipino-American conductor and music educator. He is one of the Philippines' most esteemed choral conductors. He is also a composer, singer, arranger, choral clinician, writer, producer, music minister, author, and book editor.

Navarro is more popularly known as the former conductor of the Ateneo de Manila College Glee Club. Under his direction, the group gave acclaimed performances in international events, won top prizes in prestigious international choral competitions, and participated in the 2001 European Grand Prix for Choral Singing.

He specializes in 20th and 21st century choral music, but is adept in music of many epochs. An active performer of music from different eras and ethnic traditions, he takes an interest in post-modern music, Southeast Asian music traditions, and global hymnody.

== Early life and education ==
He was born to a musical family, the first grandchild to Dalmacio and Felipa Pizaña, who were one of the earliest converts to Evangelical Christianity in the Philippines when the Americans came in 1898. He is the eldest of three children to Jose Navarro Navarro Jr. (1928-1980), a former businessman, stage actor, and orator; and Angeles Pizaña (b. 1932), a mezzo-soprano, music educator, and choir conductor. His siblings are Jeriel David (1956-1974), and Arlene Grace (b. 1962), a clinical counselor in Philadelphia, Pennsylvania.

Navarro's training as a choral artist began in his grade school years when he sang as a choir boy, first with Prof. Flora Zarco Rivera, who conducted his grade school choir; and then with Dr. Romulo Pizaña, his maternal uncle, who conducted their church choir. He attributes his musical inclinations to the nurture of very musical parents and relatives.

As a person of faith, he remembers his childhood days when his relatives would often gather to discuss and debate theological issues at the dinner table. He became interested in theology and the intersection of faith and music as a young boy. He became involved with the Inter-School Christian Fellowship, the high school ministry of Inter-Varsity Christian Fellowship, as the president of his high school chapter. He considers Filipino theologian and pastor emeritus Rev. Dr. Isabelo F. Magalit and Filipino cultural anthropologist Dr. Melba Maggay as his early mentors in his Christian faith.

Admitted to the highly-prestigious Philippine Science High School on full scholarship, he was one of the young students groomed to be future scientists in the Philippines. Upon graduation from high school in 1971, he took up B.S. Mathematics at the University of the Philippines. There he became heavily involved with choral singing and became soloist, section leader, and choir board member of the University of the Philippines Concert Chorus, then under the direction of Prof. Reynaldo T. Paguio, a protege of Lloyd Pfautsch of Southern Methodist University, and a former Dean of the University of the Philippines College of Music.

Tragedy struck in his family in February 1974 when his younger brother, Jerry, died at the age of 18. To help the family heal from the emotional trauma, his family moved to Bacolod City in southern Philippines. Finding a second home in the friendly airs and artistic endeavors of that city, Joel continued his studies at the University of St. La Salle. There he met Peque Gallaga and joined his theater group, Maskara. Navarro appeared in the lead role as Francisco Pizarro in the Peter Shaffer play "The Royal Hunt of the Sun" which Gallaga directed. The play was entered as the university's entry to the Iloilo Drama Association drama competition. The play won 1st prize in all categories, including Best Actor for Navarro, except for Best Female Actor simply because there were no female speaking lines in the play.

Navarro finished a bachelor's degree in Mathematics from the University of St. La Salle, Bacolod in 1976. He had a brief stint in Bacolod working as Research Associate at the Sugar Industry Foundation and as Math instructor at the University of Negros Occidental-Recoletos. Navarro then returned to Manila in 1977 and entered the graduate program in Mathematics at the Ateneo de Manila University as a scholar of the Fund Assistance to Private Education. He became involved with the Ateneo College Glee Club, then conducted by the great Filipino tenor, Noel Velasco. He was then invited to become Velasco's successor when Velasco left for Boston in 1979 to pursue a voice scholarship. While conducting the Glee Club, Navarro pursued a B.M. in Choral Conducting at nearby University of the Philippines College of Music in 1979. There he studied under Reynaldo Paguio and Francisco Feliciano, and earning his Bachelor of Music (1985) and Master of Music (1993) degrees in Choral Conducting. Paguio was his college conductor at the University of the Philippine Concert Chorus. Feliciano was his composition and theory professor, and later became his administrator when Navarro joined the Asian Institute for Liturgy and Music from 1989 to 1995. He earned his Doctor of Musical Arts in Conducting at Michigan State University in 2005, studying with Drs. Charles H. Smith, Jonathan Reed, and David Rayl. His doctoral dissertation was "A Style Study of Selected Choral Works of Ramon Pagayon Santos." Prior to his move to the U.S., he took intensive conducting classes under renowned German pedagogue Martin Behrmann.

Navarro moved to the United States of America in 2001 to do his doctoral studies in music conducting at Michigan State University. He was subsequently hired by Calvin University in Grand Rapids, Michigan in 2002. He became tenured in 2007, and was promoted to full professor in September 2012. Concurrent with his teaching post at the college, he served part-time as Music Minister at Hope Reformed Church, Grand Rapids from 2002 to 2008. He served part-time as Music Minister of the Basic English Service at Church of the Servant Christian Reformed Church, Grand Rapids, Michigan from 2012 to 2014. He moved to Singapore in June 2014 to teach and administer the graduate choral conducting program in church music at Singapore Bible College. He retired from full-time teaching at S.B.C. last November 30, 2020 and moved back to Manila, Philippines where he will teach online courses as an adjunct lecturer.

== Personal life ==
He is married to the former Maria Divina Amor Pascual (Amy). They have three children: Katrina Rachel, a former English teacher, and works currently as a writer and content specialist in the Philippines; Paolo Emmanuel, an environmental graphic arts designer based in Calgary, Alberta (Canada); and Jerome David, a Civil and Environmental Engineering major at Calvin College in Grand Rapids, Michigan (U.S.A.). He has three grandchildren, Lucia Eliana, Penelope June, and Lily May.

== Career ==
=== Choral conductor ===
Navarro earned distinction as a choral conductor during his years with the Ateneo de Manila College Glee Club from 1979 to 2001. Under his direction, the choir rose to national prominence when they won First Prize in the College Choir category of the National Music Competitions for Young Artists (NAMCYA) in 1980. He led the choir in several European choral competitions from 1983 to 2001, garnered many top awards, and gave critically acclaimed performances around the world.

He has also earned honor with The Capella of Calvin University. Under his direction, The Capella gave many acclaimed performances regionally and internationally. In 2008, he led the choir to two 3rd prizes at the Florilège Vocal de Tours international choral competition in Tours, France. Since The Capella's inception in 1935, Navarro is only the fourth in the succession of full-time conductors of The Capella after Seymour Swets, Howard Slenk, and Merle Mustert. Dr. Pearl Shangkuan succeeded him in the Fall of 2014 as the fifth conductor and the first female conductor of The Capella.

At Calvin University, Navarro also directed the Campus Choir which partners yearly with The Women's Chorale (Pearl Shangkuan, director) in the Advent Service of Lessons and Carols held at the La Grave Christian Reformed Church in downtown Grand Rapids. The third choir he directed was the Calvin Oratorio Society, a community choir composed of students, faculty, alumni, and friends of Calvin College. From 2003 to 2014, Navarro conducted the annual Handel's Messiah, accompanied by the Calvin Orchestra and which featured professional soloists. He was succeeded by composer-conductor Sean Ivory in both choirs.

At S.B.C. he directed the SBC Canticorum (a community choir) and the SBC Chorale, succeeding his predecessors Rev. Lee Chong Min and Dr. Virginia Tsai. While at Singapore, he also conducted the PsalmiDeo Chorale, a choir of Filipino professionals. In 2017, he was selected to be the choirmaster of the Bandung Philharmonic under Maestro Robert Nordling.

=== Educator ===
Navarro was an assistant professor and a former chair of the Conducting and Choral Ensemble Department at the University of the Philippines College of Music. He served there from 1985 to 2001. He was also vice-chairman of the Philippine Federation for Choral Music, and was main consultant for the College Choir Category of the National Music Competitions for Young Artists Foundation, National Music Competitions for Young Artists. He also had brief several teaching stints at Santa Isabel University, FEBIAS College of Bible, and at the International School Manila. There, he conducted choirs and taught conducting, music theory, and I.B. Music subjects.

He is regularly invited in Southeast Asia to give workshops and seminars in choral conducting, church music and hymnody, Philippine choral music, and choral music in general. In August 2002, he gave a lecture at the World Symposium of Choral Music in Minneapolis, Minnesota. His article The State of Philippine Choral Music Today has been published on the International Choral Bulletin. He contributed a chapter in Dr. Anne Kwantes' book Chapters in Philippine Church History. In August 2020, his book, INSPIRARE: Breathing Life Into Our Music, A Manual for Church Choir Conductors in Asia, was published by Sonata Music of Singapore.

At Calvin University, Navarro was tenured in 2007 and was promoted to Full Professor of Music in 2012. There he has taught choirs, conducting, and Vocal-Choral Pedagogy.

At Singapore Bible College where his current post began in July 2014, Navarro was Professor and Lecturer and conducted the SBC Chorale and SBC Canticorum. He also taught graduate courses in advanced conducting, instrumental conducting, rehearsal technique, diction, choral literature, vocal literature, choral methods, vocal-choral pedagogy, score study and interpretation, and conducting studio, and conducting recital. Navarro also taught for the Bandung Theological Seminary which, in cooperation with SBC, offers the Master of Ministry in Worship and Music Leadership.

At St. Paul University Manila, he helped develop and teaches for the modular program for the Doctor of Musical Arts in Conducting which began in late 2017.

Since he arrived in Singapore in 2014, he was juror for two Arts Adjudications for the Singapore Youth Festival under the Ministry of Education, two international choral competitions, and a national competition for church choirs in Indonesia (PESPARAWI).

=== Pop music ===
Joel Navarro had a stint as a popular singer-songwriter. His song “Swerte-Swerte Lang” was one of the finalists at the First Metro Manila Popular Music Festival (1978), and is one of the Philippines' most popular contemporary songs to date. He has also contributed to and recorded many popular compositions for "Papuri!", a project of the Far East Broadcasting Company which promotes the best Filipino Christian contemporary songs each year.

=== Choral Composer ===
He has a few choral compositions and arrangements published (see listing at the end of this article).

His sabbatical project in the spring of 2011 was to collect and arrange 50 of the best-known Filipino hymns and translate them to English for use in the Filipino diaspora. With the help of Filipino scriptwriter Jacqueline Franquelli, the work, entitled SAMBA: Hymns and Songs of Worship, has been completed and is undergoing editing for future publication.

Here continues to write and arrange anthems for choirs. The last one, "In God Alone," written by Dodjie and Eliza Simon, was in celebration of 100 years of Filipino-American Methodism.

He was also one of twelve members of the Editorial Committee for hymnal Lift Up Your Hearts of the Christian Reformed Church in America and the Reformed Church in America. Released last May 2013, the hymnal contains more than 900 hymns selected from thousands of hymns reviewed from all over the world. Last September 13, 2013, the magazine Worship Leader judged the hymnal as "The Best New Music Pick," one of the leading publications for worship leaders and worship planners today. Recently, over 30,000 copies of the hymnal have already been sold.

=== Theater Acting ===
Navarro was also involved in drama, musical theater, and opera during his college days. He was Creon in Jean Anouilh's "Antigone" in a play directed by Behn Cervantes, professor of drama and theater at the University of the Philippines. In musical theater, he was arguably the first Joseph in Asia who played the title role in Webber and Rice's "Joseph and the Amazing Technicolor Dreamcoat" in 1972, a play directed by now famous off-Broadway director Loy Arcenas. He was also involved in many musical theater productions in the 70s which played at the Cultural Center of the Philippines and the Meralco Theater. These include acting stints with Lerner-Loewe's "My Fair Lady," Webber-Rice's "Jesus Christ Superstar," Leonard Bernstein's "Mass," and Schwartz's "Godspell." He also rose to become musical director in some musicals such as "The King and I," "The Great White Way," and "West Side Story." As an operatic baritone, he played the role of Mercutio in Gounod's "Romeo and Juliet" and the lead role in "Eugene Onegin."

== Awards and recognitions ==
=== Conductor ===
- Third Prize, Mixed Choir Category, Florilege Vocal de Tours, France, 2008.
- Third Prize, Free Category, Florilege Vocal de Tours, France, 2008.
- Grand Prix de la Ville Tours, Florilege Vocal de Tours, France, 2000.
- First Prize, Mixed Choir Category. Florilege Vocal de Tours, France, 2000.
- First Prize, Free Programme Category, Florilege Vocal de Tours, France, 2000.
- Special Prix 2000, for the best rendition of a 20th-century work, Florilege Vocal de Tours, France 2000.
- Prix de Public, Florilege Vocal de Tours, France, 2000.
- Best Choral Album, “Lahi”, KATHA Awards (Conductor of the Ateneo College Glee Club), 1997.
- First Prize, Folkloric Category, International Dia del Canto Coral, Cantonigros, Spain, 1983.
- Third Prize, Mixed Choir Category, International Dia del Canto Coral, Cantonigros, Spain, 1983.
- Fifth Prize, Mixed Choir Category, International Choral Competitions, Arezzo, Italy, 1983.
- National Champion, National Music Competitions for Young Artists, College Choir (Conductor of Ateneo College Glee Club), 1980.

=== Professor ===
- Fellow, Nagel Institute for World Christianity. Sabbatical Grant for Spring 2011.
- Sabbatical Grant, Calvin Alumni Association, Spring 2011.
- Professorial Chair, Ateneo Glee Club Alumni Batch 65–71, Ateneo de Manila University, 1999.
- Most Outstanding Male Faculty, Award granted by the University of the Philippines College of Music Student Council, 1999.
- Metro Manila Authority Professorial Chair in Choral Conducting, University of the Philippines, 1998.
- British Council Visitorship Grantee, 1985.

=== Undergraduate ===
- Full Scholar, Graduate School, University of the Philippines, 1985–1993.
- Departmental Awardee, Undergraduate Conducting, University of the Philippines, 1981.
- College Recognition for Outstanding Achievement as an Undergraduate, University of the Philippines College of Music, 1981.
- College Scholar, University of the Philippines College of Music, 1979–1982.
- Full Scholar, Bishop Julian M. Teodoro Foundation, 1979–85.

Singer

- Interpreter, Metro Manila Popular Song Festival. Song entry: “Manalig Ka.” Music and lyrics by Joel Navarro. 1984.
- Interpreter, Metro Manila Popular Song Festival. Song entry: “Larawan.” Music and lyrics by Thomas Santos. 1980.
- Interpreter, Metro Manila Popular Song Festival. Song entry: “Swerte-Swerte Lang.” Music by Joel Navarro, lyrics by Rolando Tinio. 1977.
- National Champion (Singer's Category), Paligsahan Sa Musika, Cultural Center of the Philippines, 1974.

Songwriter

- Finalist, Metro Manila Popular Song Festival. Song entry: “Swerte-Swerte Lang” 1977.
- Finalist, Metro Manila Popular Song Festival. Song entry: “Manalig Ka” 1980.

Choral Arranger

- Best Choral Arrangement of a Traditional Song, “Lagi Kitang Naaalala”, KATHA Awards, 1997.

Actor

- Best Actor, Francisco Pizarro, in Peter Shaffer's “Royal Hunt of the Sun,” Iloilo Drama Association, 1976.

== Published articles, compositions, arrangements ==
=== Articles ===
- Article, "The Gifting of Songs:What We Can Learn From Other Communities," Reformed Worship (http://www.reformedworship.org/article/june-2013/gifting-songs)
- Article, “Bridging the Gaps: The Conductor as Interconnector and Interlocutor.” Jeremiah's Dilemma. Issue 4, Nov. 2011.
- Contributor, Andre de Quadros’ article on Asian Choral Music for The Oxford Companion to Choral Music.
- Article, “Book Review on The Cambridge Companion to Conducting, Jose Antonio Bowen, Editor” Nineteenth Century Music, Dr. Anne Harwell Celenza, Book Review Editor, 2005.
- “Philippine Choral Music”, International Choral Bulletin, 1993.
- “Music in the Philippine Protestant Churches from 1960-2000” Chapters in Philippine Church History, edited by Anne C. Kwantes. OMF Literature, 2001.

=== Compositions (Published) ===
- Non Nobis Domine. For SSAATTBB a cappella choir. Composed in 2001. Published by Adoro Music Publishing, 2011. https://web.archive.org/web/20120408075851/http://www.adoromusicpub.com/catalog/item.xml?id=101
- Sing to the Lord a New Song. For SSAATTBB a cappella choir, 1993. Revised 2009. Published by Adoro Music Publishing, 2010.
- Lord Is My Shepherd. For SSAATTBB a cappella choir. 1995. Published by Musica Manila, 2005. http://www.musicamanila.com/#anchor_199
- God, You Spin the Whirling Planets. For SATB and organ, 2003. Published by GIA.

http://www.giamusic.com/search_details.cfm?title_id=1013

=== Arrangements (Published) ===
- Ososo: Come Now, O Prince of Piece. Music by Geonyong Lee. Text by Marion Pope, 2010. Published by GIA Publications. http://www.giamusic.com/search_details.cfm?title_id=11298
- Praise the Lord Who Heals. Melody and words by Norman Agatep. Published in Psalms for All Seasons, 2011. Published by Calvin Institute of Christian worship, Faith Alive Christian Resources, and Brazos Press.
- Miserere (Psalm 51). Melody by Jun-G Bargayo and Junjun Delmonte, 2011. Published in Psalms for All Seasons, 2011. Published by Calvin Institute of Christian worship, Faith Alive Christian Resources, and Brazos Press.
- In the Heavens Shone a Star. Words by Jonathan Malicsi and Ellsworth Chandlee © 1990, 2000, Christian Conference of Asia, admin. GIA Publications, Inc. Music: Traditional Kalinga melody, arr. Joel Navarro; © 2010 Faith Alive Christian Resources. Published in Global Songs for Worship.
- Far Beyond Our Mind's Grasp. Words by Francisco F. Feliciano © General Board of Global Ministries t/a GBGMusik. Music: Bicol folksong, arr. Joel Navarro © 2010 Faith Alive Christian Resources.
- Dios O Kayamanan. Words and music by Jungee Marcelo. Published by Institute for Studies in Asian Church and Culture, 1988.
- Sumasamba, Sumasamo. Words and music by Andrei Dionisio. Published by Institute for Studies in Asian Church and Culture, 1988.
- Buhay Mo ang Buhay Ko. Words and music by Jennys Cabaluna. Published by Institute for Studies in Asian Church and Culture, 1988.

=== Choral Compositions ===
- Palm. For SATB a cappella choir. Text by Otto Selles, 2009.
- In that Language of Languages. For SATB a cappella choir. Text by Thom Satterlee, 2008.
- Psalm 131: My Heart is not Proud, O Lord. For SATB a cappella choir. 2005.
- We Are His People. For SATB choir, with brass and organ, 2005.
- What Is My Only Comfort? For SSAA a cappella choir, 2003.
- A Song of Choices. For SATB choir divisi, 1998.
- Tatlong Salmong Awit. For SSA a cappella choir, 1993.
- Awit sa Intramuros, For SATB-SATB a cappella choir, 1995.
- Hanggang Langit. For SSAATTBB choir and baritone solo, 1982.

• To the Little Child. For SATB choir and piano, 1981.

=== Choral arrangements ===
- Dakilang Katapatan. Music and Tagalog Lyrics by Arnel De Pano, 2011.
- Swerte-Swerte Lang. Music by Joel Navarro. Tagalog Lyrics by Rolando S. Tinio, 2011.
- Advent Canticle, December, 2005.
- Mga Awiting Pamasko, 1998. Commissioned by the University of the Philippines Presidential Committee on Culture and the Arts.
- Mga Awiting Makabayan, a cappella choir, 1997.
- Nais Ko Medley, choir and orchestra, 1997.
- Lagi Kitang Naaalala, for 12-part male a choir, a cappella, 1997. Won KATHA Award for Best Recorded Choral Arrangement,
- Willy Cruz Medley, choir and orchestra, 1996.
- Prayer for Generosity, a cappella choir, 1995.
- Ateneo Graduation Hymn, SSAATTBB a cappella, 1982.

=== Hymn arrangements ===
- Kadakilaan Mo (Your Majesty, O God). Melody by Bernardo Custodio, Tagalog words by Serafin E. Ruperto, 2011.
- Ating Purihin (O Let Us Praise God). Melody by Eliseo M. Pajaro, Tagalog words by Danilo M. Sanchez, 2011.
- O Aming Dios (O God, We Come and Bring Our Praise to You). Melody and Tagalog words by Jun Castro, 2011.
- Purihin Dios na Dakila (Come Gather Together). Melody and Tagalog words by Raul Lantican, 2011.
- Dios ng Pag-ibig (God of Compassion). Melody and Tagalog words by Gary Granada, 2011.
- Dakilang Maylikha (Creation Calls You King). Melody and Tagalog words by Gary Granada, 2011.
- Ating Purihin ang Dios (Come Worship, Give Praise to the King). Melody and Tagalog words by Gary Granada, 2011.
- Purihin Natin Ang Dios ng Hiwaga (We Offer Our Praise). Melody and Tagalog words by Francisco F. Feliciano, 2011.
- Panaghoy (Lamentation). Melody and Tagalog words by Gary Granada, 2011.
- The Face of God. Melody and words by Manuel V. Francisco, SJ, 2011.
- Blessed are the Poor in Spirit. Melody and words by Raul Lantican, 2011.
- He is the Resurrection and the Life. Melody by Danilo M. Jorvina. Words by Nelson C. Tantoco, 2011.
- Tunay Kang Matapat (Faithful Are You, O God). Melody by Daniel S. Tan. Tagalog words by Roger J. Bolivar, 2011.
- Buhay Mo ang Buhay Ko (Your Life, O Lord). Melody and Tagalog words by Jennys Cabaluna, 2011.
- Di Mapapantayan (Matchless Love). Melody and Tagalog words by Jennys Cabaluna, 2011.
- Buhayin Kaming Muli (Revive Anew, We Pray). Melody and Tagalog words by Jennys Cabaluna, 2011.
- Sumasamba, Sumasamo (I Lift Your Name, I Bend My Knee). Melody and Tagalog words by Andrei Dionisio, 2011.
- Kunin Mo and Aking Puso (Take Our Hearts Which We Now Offer). Melody and Tagalog words by Teresita Valeriano, 2011.
- My Soul Finds Rest. Melody by Arnel dC Aquino, Words based on Psalm 62, 2011.
- I Love the Lord. Melody by Arnel dC Aquino, Words based on Psalm 116, 2011.
- In Him Alone. Melody and words by Manuel V. Francisco, SJ, 2011.
- Your Heart Today. Melody and words by Manuel V. Francisco, SJ, 2011.
- Thanks to God, Author of Living. Melody from a Samoan hymn. Words by Terry McArthur, 2011.
- Magpasalamat Sa Kanya (Offer a New Song unto the Lord). Melody by Norman Agatep. Tagalog words by Lui Morano, 2011.
- Di Ako Karapat-dapat (At Your Table, Lord, We Gather). Melody and Tagalog words by Francisco F. Feliciano, 2011.
- Hindi Ko Maisip (Far Beyond Our Mind's Grasp). Melody from a Bicolano folksong. Tagalog words by Francisco F. Feliciano, 2011.
- Sa Harap ng Pagkain (With the Grace of This Day's Food). Melody and Tagalog words by Francisco F. Feliciano, 2011.
- Hindi Kita Malilimutan (I'll Never Leave You nor Forsake You). Melody and Tagalog words by Manuel v. Francisco, 2011.
- Tanging Yaman (My Dearest Treasure). Melody and Tagalog words by Manuel v. Francisco, 2011.
- Sa Dulang ng Ama (Come, Gather at His Feast). Melody and Tagalog words by Gary Granada, 2011.
- Paglilingkod (What Service Can I Do?). Melody and Tagalog words by Samuel V. Guerrero, 2011.
- Pagsamba at Pakikibaka (Worship Your God and Defend All His People). Melody and Tagalo words by Gary Granada, 2011.
- Lord, You Give the Great Commission. Melody by Daniel P. Cariño. Words by Jeffrey Rowthorne, 2011.
- Iukit Ang ‘Yong Batas (Engrave Your Law in Our Hearts). Melody and Tagalog words by Manuel V. Francisco, SJ, 2011.
- At Home in Our Hearts. Melody and words by Manuel V. Francisco, SJ, 2011.
- Sapagkat ang Dios ay Pag-ibig (For God is Love). Melody and Tagalog words by Dave Magalong, 2011.
- I Have a Plan. Melody by Norman Agatep. Words based on Jeremiah 29:11, 2011.
- Humayo’t Ihayag (O Come Let Us Proclaim). Melody and Tagalog words by Manuel V. Francisco, SJ, 2011.

=== Hymn text translations ===
- Come Gather Together (Purihin Dios na Dakila). Melody and Tagalog words by Raul Lantican, 2011.
- We Offer Our Praise (Purihin Natin and Dios ng Hiwaga). Melody and Tagalog words by Francisco F. Feliciano, 2011.
- Lamentation (Panaghoy). Melody and Tagalog words by Gary Granada, 2011.
- Faithful Are You, O God (Tunay Kang Matapat). Melody by Daniel S. Tan. Tagalog words by Roger J. Bolivar, 2011.
- Your Life, O Lord (Buhay Mo ang Buhay Ko). Melody and Tagalog words by Jennys Cabaluna, 2011.
- Matchless Love (Di Mapapantayan). Melody and Tagalog words by Jennys Cabaluna, 2011.
- Revive Anew, We Pray (Buhayin Kaming Muli). Melody and Tagalog words by Jennys Cabaluna, 2011.
- At Your Table, Lord, We Gather (Di Ako Karapat-dapat). Melody and Tagalog words by Francisco F. Feliciano, 2011.

=== Song arrangements (recorded and released) ===
- When I Was a Child, (Recorded June 2006, For Release in November 2006)
- My God, My River, (Recorded June 2006, For Release in November 2006)
- The Assumption Medley, (Recorded June 2006, For Release in November 2006)
- The Earth Is the Place of God's Glory, (Recorded June 2006, For Release in November 2006)
- I See the Dawn, (Recorded June 2006, For Release in November 2006)
- Love's All We Have, (Recorded June 2006, For Release in November 2006)
- The Angelus, (Recorded June 2006, For Release in November 2006)
- Hymn Medley, 2000.
- Sapagka’t Ang Diyos Natin Ay Pag-ibig, 1990.

=== Recorded songs ===
- Swerte-Swerte Lang (Music by Joel Navarro, Filipino Lyrics by Rolando Tinio; Sung by Joel Navarro)
- Will It Ever Come to You (Music and Lyrics by Joel Navarro; Sung by Leah Navarro)
- Pagsinta'y Pang-Araw at Ulan (Music by Joel Navarro; Filipino Lyrics by Rolando Tinio; Sung by Basol Valdez)
- Hanggang Langit (Music by Joel Navarro, Lyrics by Jerry Uy; Sung by Nonoy Zuñiga and the Ateneo College Glee Club)
- Manalig Ka (Music by Joel Navarro, Lyrics by N. Arnel de Pano; Sung by Dio Marco)
- Larawan (Music and Lyrics by Thomas Santos; Sung by Joel Navarro)
- Bawat Hakbang (Music and Lyrics by Butch Charvet; Sung by Joel Navarro)
- Isang Salmo (Music and Lyrics by Joel Navarro; Sung by Joel Navarro)
- Kapuri-puri (Music and Lyrics by Joel Navarro; Sung by Joel Navarro)
- Kung Kapiling Ka (Music and Lyrics by Joel Navarro; Sung by Joel Navarro and Jai Sabas-Aracama)
- Questions (Music and Lyrics by Joel Navarro; Sung by Joel Navarro)
- Darkness Into Light (Music and Lyrics by N. Arnel de Pano; Sung by Joel Navarro)
- Dakilang Katapatan (Music and Lyrics by N. Arnel de Pano; Sung by Joel Navarro)
