= Örebro Chamber Orchestra =

Örebro Chamber Orchestra is the string section of the Scandinavia's only full-time professional chamber orchestra, the Swedish Chamber Orchestra (Svenska Kammarorkestern). The Swedish Chamber Orchestra, which was formed in 1995, is a result of merging the Örebro Chamber Orchestra and the Örebro Wind Ensemble. The home of the orchestra is the Örebro Konserthus (Örebro Concert Hall). The Örebro Chamber Orchestra has played with soloists around the world, which include Kerstin Svensson, Mats Widlund, Lynnette Seah, Mårten Larsson, and Marie Eriksson, just to name a few.
