= National Music Competitions for Young Artists =

Annual music competition in the Philippines

The National Music Competitions for Young Artists Foundation or NAMCYA was founded in the Philippines in 1973. It was created by virtue of President Ferdinand Marcos' Presidential Proclamation No. 1173, which declares the period between November 26 and December 12 every year as National Week for Young Artists.

The NAMCYA seeks to encourage young artists who excel in music composition and performance to preserve, develop, and promote Philippine music as an art and a handmaid of cultural development. The project aims to discover young artists in the field of choral singing, piano, chamber music, family ensemble, and indigenous instruments.

Since 1973, the main sponsoring institution of the annual events has been the Cultural Center of the Philippines (CCP) whose president sits as chairperson of the national committee which conducts the competitions. The CCP has also hosted the competitions and festivals in its venues.

The annual competition is rigid. The competitors must win in the district, provincial, then regional competitions to be able to compete on the national level. They are required to perform a cluster of works - classical and contemporary pieces, as well as works of leading Filipino composers.

== Eligibility ==
The competition is open to Filipino citizens and is divided into four categories:

- Senior Categories – 19 years old to not more than 30 years old
- Junior Categories – 13 years old to not more than 19 years old
- Children's Categories – Not more than 14 years old
- Open Categories – Not more than 30 years old

== Categories ==
- Senior Guitar
- Senior Rondalla
- Junior Piano
- Junior Strings
- Junior Voice
- Junior Choir (Mixed & Equal Voices)
- Junior Solo Rondalla
- Children's Rondalla
- Brass
- Traditional Music Expressions

== Notable winners ==
Many NAMCYA winners have become successful artists, like pianists, Rowena Arrieta, Jaime Bolipata, Charisse Baldoria, Aima Labra-Makk, Dionisia Fernandez, Jovianney Cruz, Ariel Dechosa, Zinorl Broñola; violinists, Orville Cerna, Hector Corpus-Aguilar, Hernan Constantino, Joseph Esmilla, Regina Buenaventura and Joey Corpus; tenor Noel Velasco; sopranos Andion Fernandez and Wilardena Misenas; cellists Ramon Bolipata; Renato Lucas and flautist Antonio Maigue.

Notable NAMCYA choral group winners include The University of the Philippines Singing Ambassadors, the Ateneo de Manila College Glee Club, The University of the Philippines Concert Chorus, The University of the Philippines Cherubims and Seraphims, Loboc Children's Choir, Saint Louis University, Baguio City Glee Club, PNU Chorale, the Boscorale, the Himig Singers, University of Mindanao Chorale of Davao City and UPLB Choral Ensemble. The children's choral group winners includes the AUP Young Voices, Laoag City Children's Choir, Baao District Children's Choir and many more.
