= Zurich Symphony Orchestra =

Swiss orchestra

- Orchestra
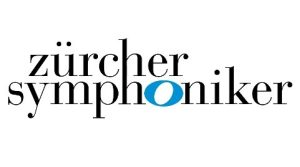
- Native name: Zürcher Symphoniker
- Founded: 1981; 45 years ago
- Location: Zurich, Switzerland
- Concert hall: Tonhalle, Zurich
- Website: zuercher-symphoniker.com

Zürcher Symphoniker (Zurich Symphony Orchestra) is a symphony orchestra made of up 72 professional freelance musicians, based in Zurich, Switzerland. It was founded in 1981 by music director, Daniel Schweizer. The orchestra performs approximately thirty-five concerts per year, with the Tonhalle as its resident concert hall. Some of the soloists which the orchestra has performed with include Brigitte Farner, Michiko Tsuda, Nina Karmon, Lynnette Seah, Ulrich Meldau, Raffael Gintoli, Oswaldo Souza and Michael Erni. The orchestra has toured Singapore, Germany, Italy, China and Spain.
