= Bernard Tan (composer) =

Singaporean composer (born 1943)

Bernard Tan Tiong Gie (born 18 May 1943 in Singapore) is a Singaporean musician, composer, physicist and engineer.

== Early life and education ==
Tan was educated at the Anglo-Chinese School, Singapore, the University of Singapore (Bachelor of Science with Honours in Physics, 1965) and Oxford University (Doctor of Philosophy in Engineering Science, 1968). He is a Chartered Engineer and Member of the Institution of Electrical Engineers (UK), Fellow of the Institute of Physics (U.K), Fellow of the Institute of Physics, Singapore, and Fellow of Trinity College of Music, London.

== Academic career ==
Tan joined the then University of Singapore (now the National University of Singapore) in 1968 as a lecturer in Physics and served first as Vice-Dean and then as Dean of Science of the Faculty of Science at NUS for 12 years from 1985 to 1997. He has also been Head of Physics, Acting Head of Music, and Associate Director of the Centre for Musical Activities and Dean of Students. Other appointments previously held by Tan are Chairman of the Centre for Remote Imaging, Sensing and Processing (CRISP) and the Singapore Synchrotron Light Source (SSLS).

Bernard Tan's current research interests are in microwave solid-state properties and devices, digital musical analysis and synthesis, and directional perception of multiple sound sources. He has published over 100 papers in international peer-reviewed journals.

== Musical career ==
As a composer, U.S. music publisher Neil Kjos has published a number of his choral works, and his Piano Concerto was premiered in January 2002 by the Singapore Symphony Orchestra (SSO). In 2006, the SSO performed the world premier of his new Violin Concerto with violinist Lynnette Seah as soloist.

== Other career ==
Tan also sits on the boards of k1 eBiz, the Singapore Symphonia Company and CSA Holdings, and is Chairman of Keppel Credit Union. He is Chairman of the Singapore Arts Festival Steering Committee, the Singapore Youth Awards Science and Technology Advisory Committee and Cadi Scientific. He was also a former independent non-executive director of Keppel Corporation from 2003 to 2015.

== Awards and honours ==
Tan has been awarded the Public Administration Medal (Silver), the Public Service Medal, the Public Service Star and the Public Service Star (Bar).
