= Ateneo de Manila College Glee Club =

Philippine choir

- Choir
- Origin: Quezon City, Philippines
- Founded: 1921
- Music director: Phoebe Bitoon
- Affiliation: Ateneo de Manila University

The Ateneo de Manila College Glee Club (ACGC), simply known as the Ateneo Glee Club, is a choir based in the Ateneo de Manila University, Philippines. It is distinguished as the oldest university chorale in the Philippines, celebrating its 98th season in 2018. It has held concerts internationally, and has released several albums with songs genres ranging from Classical, Negro spiritual, Sacred choral works, as well as Pop, and OPM. The glee club remains active internationally through the performances it stages and choral festivals it participates in.

== History ==
The glee club was started in 1921, the year the American Jesuits took over the administration of Ateneo Municipal de Manila. Its primary function was providing liturgical music at the San Ignacio Church in old Intramuros. Jose Mossesgeld Santiago, a 1911 graduate of the Ateneo who became the first Filipino to sing at La Scala de Milan, was appointed conductor.

Following a three-year hiatus, James B. Reuter restarted the glee club. In 1974, when the university turned co-educational, the choir became mixed.

In 1979 Joel Navarro joined up with the ACGC. A string of performances of the choir, including the Concert in Your Homes, TV and hotel shows and the 1980 National Music Competition for Young Artists (NAMCYA) where they won the First Prize in the College Division, followed. When the second International Choral Festival (ICF) was held in the Cultural Center of the Philippines the year after, the glee club was top-rated among the Philippine choirs that participated for "opening the gates of heaven with their moving rendition of Thompson's Alleluia" as a critic wrote.

In 1989, they went on a brief European tour and were cited Best Choir in the international festivals in Loreto, Italy and Nancy, France. A year later, Navarro took a 3-year leave due to the pressure of work from the University of the Philippines (UP), and the Asian Institute of Liturgy and Music (AILM). Eudenice Palaruan, Navarro's friend and replacement as the conductor, began North American and Guam concert tours, a national tour, and a concert with Lea Salonga in Manila.

Navarro's determination to eschew the lure of European tilts and steer his group toward a niche in the recording arena paid off in 1996 when the GC snared a couple of Katha awards: for Best rendition of a Traditional song "Lagi kitang Naaalala" and for Best Traditional Music Album for "Lahi". It was a first for any university-based chorale, and more importantly, Lahi became the first and by far the only classical, choral or traditional recording to be nominated Album of the Year competing against the country's mainstream commercial recordings. Then, he led them in successful concert tours in Guam and North America (1997), in a national tour (1998), and in Guam again (1999).

At the turn of the millennium, the glee club did very well. Under Navarro and Jonathan Velasco, they swept all the competitions they joined in two months in Slovenia, Italy, Ireland and France - and reached the apex by winning the Grand Prix in Tours, France. In less than a year they added more laurels to their credentials - top prizes in Tolosa, Spain. In 2001, they won First Prize in Marktoberdorf, Germany, under the leadership of Velasco.

The following year, the glee club embarked on a new paradigm in choral singing after Ramon Acoymo, alumnus of the Philippine Madrigal Singers, accomplished tenor soloist, and vocal pedagogue, took over as musical director. He led the new batch of the glee club and honed the raw but promising skills of the Katipunan-based singers. He culminated his term by commissioning new compositions of Marian songs set into choral idiom.

In 2002 the glee club had its first female conductor in the person, Ma. Lourdes Hermo, an alumna of the Philippine Madrigal Singers and the Philippine Youth Orchestra. Under Hermo, the choir went on a concert tour of the United States and Guam in 2004, performed in festivals, had a live recording in 2005, and celebrated its 85th year with a European competition-concert tour where they won all awards in Miltenberg, Germany and top prizes in Arezzo, Italy in 2006.

In celebration of its 90th year in 2011, the group embarked on another European tour. It won in the 33rd International May Choir Competition in Varna, Bulgaria, earning them the distinction to compete in the European Grand Prix for Choral Singing (GPE) in Maribor, Slovenia in April 2012.

== Notable music directors ==
- Eudenice V. Palaruan
- Joel Magus P. Navarro
- James B. Reuter, S.J.
- Antonio J. Molina

== Discography ==
- Langit: The Filipino Sings Of Faith (1994)
- Lahi: The Filipino Sings From The Heart (1995)
- An Offering (1999)
- European Tour 2000
- European Tour 2001
- ACGC Anthology (2004)
- Tagumpay Nating Lahat (2006)
- Tayo'y Mga Pinoy (2008)
- In Excelsis (2012)
