= Atin Cu Pung Singsing =

Filipino folk song

Atin Cu Pung Singsing is a traditional Filipino folk song from Central Luzon, Philippines in Kapampangan sung by adults and children. The precise origins of the song are unknown, and there is debate whether it was pre-historic or colonial. Its melody is most likely from the 18th century as it was similar to Spanish and Mexican folk songs of the period. The song has a woman as its main character and a man as a secondary character. The woman in the song was looking for a missing ring given by her mother and offers her love as a prize for the man who could find it.

Lyrics of the song "Atin Ku Pung Singsing"
Kapampangan (Original)	Tagalog Translation	English Translation
Atin ku pung singsing Metung yang timpukan Amana ke iti King indung ibatan Sangkan keng sininup King metung a kaban Mewala ya iti E ku kamalayan	Ako ay may singsing May batong kay inam Binigay sa akin Ng mahal kong nanay Sa tapat ng dibdib Iningat-ingatan; Kung sa'n nawaglit 'Di ko na nalaman Nawala ang singsing 'Di ko na nakita	I once had a ring With a beautiful gem I inherited this From my mother So I put it in chest But it was gone Without my notice
Ing sukal ning lub ku Susukdul king banwa Pikurus kung gamat Babo ning lamesa Ninu mang manakit King singsing kung mana Kalulung pusu ku Manginu ya keya	Ang hangarin ng puso ko'y umaabot sa langit Ipinatong ko ang aking mga braso sa mesa Sinumang makatagpo sa singsing na aking minana Ang kawawa kong puso ay nananabik sa kanya	My Heart aches As high as the sky I crossed my hands On the table Whoever finds my inherited ring My poor heart Will worship him/her

== In popular culture ==
The folk song was interpreted by Filipino popular artists such as Lea Salonga in Ryan Cayabyab's Bahaghari album, Freddie Aguilar and Nora Aunor. It was also performed by different orchestras and brass bands.

The 1985, film Virgin Forest directed by Peque Gallaga, has it sung by adventurers while sailing the Pampanga River.

The popular Filipino children’s song Ako ay May Lobo (literally: "I have a Balloon") borrows the melody of this folk song.

Michael Raymon Pangilinan, a Kapampangan language scholar, presented a paper titled “Atin ku pûng singsing: discussion on the mystical and anti-colonial symbolisms of an ancient Kapampangan song” at the 1st International Conference on Kapampángan Studies held in Angeles City in September 2001. Based on his paper, Atin Ku Pûng Singsing has a deeper meaning hidden in the words of the song, just like any other folk song back in the day.
