= One (Ryan Cayabyab album) =

Studio album by Ryan Cayabyab
- Released: 1981
- Genre: A cappella; pop rock; danza
- Language: Filipino
- Label: Jem Records
- Producer: Ryan Cayabyab

One is a 1981 a capella album by Filipino composer Ryan Cayabyab under Jem Records.

== Background ==
Ryan Cayabyab in 1981 was still in the process of getting a degree at the University of the Philippines' College of Music. He entered the college in 1973, but his studies have been placed on hold several times due to making music tours. By 1981, he had already accomplished all requirements needed to obtain the degree except for the recital which he would finish two years later.

Cayabyab initially considering to end his career in performing music after he was offered a job as a university lecturer by his theory teacher at the UP College of Music in 1981. He made an album as a "birthday gift" to himself and was supposed to be his swan song prior to shifting his music career to teaching.

He spent ₱43,000 (or US$5,440 in 1981; ₱842,000 or US$17,500 in 2022) to produce the album, entitled One. He decided to include Filipino songs in a capella due to his prior involvement in filmmaking years prior and experiment of using vocals instead of live instruments as part of the background music of the album's songs.

The album mostly contained classic Filipino songs with three original songs including "Kay Ganda Ng Ating Musika".

== Track listing ==
One contained ten songs both original compositions and cover songs. All songs were performed and arranged by Cayabyab himself. The a capella album was marketed as featuring Cayabyab's "16 different voices", reportedly ranged from bass to soprano — the first of its kind in Philippine recording industry. Among the songs featured are the Tagalog folk song "Bakya Mo Neneng"; a rendition of "Kay Ganda ng Ating Musika", which was an earlier work by Cayabyab and the winning entry of the inaugural Metro Pop Songwriting Competition in 1978; and "Tsismis", an original composition by Cayabyab.

Side A
No.	Title	Length
1.	"Bakya Mo Neneng"	3:21
2.	"Mamang Kutsero"	2:25
3.	"Hindi Kita Malimot"	3:28
4.	"Saan Ka Man Naroroon"	3:16
5.	"Tsismis"	2:22
Total length:		14:52

Side B
No.	Title	Length
1.	"Dahil Sa Iyo"	3:23
2.	"Liman-Dipang Tao"	3:54
3.	"Minamahal, Sinasamba"	3:28
4.	"Maalaala Mo Kaya"	3:04
5.	"Kay Ganda Ng Ating Musika"	2:58
Total length:		16:47
