= Ryan Ryan Musikahan =

- Title card
- Genre: Musical show
- Written by: Jim Paredes
- Directed by: Leo Rialp (1988-1989); Johnny Manahan (1990); Menchu Dalusong (1990-1995)
- Presented by: Ryan Cayabyab
- Country of origin: Philippines
- Original languages: Filipino; English
- No. of episodes: 364

Production
- Executive producer: Tammy Quirino-Reinoso
- Production locations: ABS-CBN Broadcasting Center, Quezon City, Philippines (1988-1993); Various Locations (1993-1995)
- Running time: 60 minutes
- Production company: ABS-CBN Studios

Original release
- Network: ABS-CBN
- Release: June 2, 1988 – July 6, 1995

Ryan Ryan Musikahan is a Philippine television variety show broadcast by ABS-CBN. Hosted by Ryan Cayabyab, it aired from June 2, 1988 to July 6, 1995.

== Format ==
The show featured some of the local and international artists thru musical numbers. The original version of the show was directed by Leo Rialp, then he replaced by Menchu Dalusong.

In 1993, the show was reformatted and was held at various locations outside the studio (e.g. hotels).

== Host ==
- Ryan Cayabyab

== Re-runs and specials ==
The show currently airs re-runs every Saturday evening, 10:00 PM on Jeepney TV until April 2024.

Since being reaired on the Jeepney TV, various specials have been produced by the channel such as "Ryan Ryan Musikahan: Home For Christmas", a 2015 Christmas special; and "Ryan Ryan Musikahan: Piyano At Gitara" which was aired on August 20, 2016, and was directed by Johnny Manahan. Other specials include "Para sa Bayan: A Ryan Ryan Musikahan Special" and "Ryan Ryan Musikahan: Christmas From the Heart".

== Accolades ==
Year	Award-giving body	Category	Recipient	Result
1992	PMPC Star Awards for Television	Best Musical Show	Ryan Ryan Musikahan	Won
1992	PMPC Star Awards for Television	Best Musical Show Host	Ryan Cayabyab	Won
1989	PMPC Star Awards for Television			
1989	PMPC Star Awards for Television	Best Musical Show	Ryan Ryan Musikahan	Won
1989	PMPC Star Awards for Television	Best Musical Show Host	Ryan Cayabyab	Won
