= San Miguel Foundation for the Performing Arts =

The San Miguel Foundation for the Performing Arts
- Origin: Philippines
- Genres: Filipino
- Years active: 2001–2007
- Website: www.sanmiguelperformingarts.com

The San Miguel Foundation for the Performing Arts was a multi-awarded performing arts group of the Philippines. It was founded in May 2001 by Eduardo "Danding" Cojuangco and musician Ryan Cayabyab and aims to be a staunch advocate in the preservation, performance, and development of Filipino music.

The foundation consists of two major performing groups: the San Miguel Philharmonic Orchestra and the San Miguel Master Chorale. These performing groups have premiered over a hundred Filipino compositions and arrangements in various concerts and recordings. The Foundation also undertakes co-production with other agencies to promote Filipino music.

== Disbandment ==
The SMFPA, together with the San Miguel Master Chorale and Philharmonic Orchestra, was disbanded in late January 2007 by the San Miguel Corporation.
