= San Miguel Master Chorale =

SMMC Logo

The San Miguel Master Chorale (SMMC), now non-existent, was the first professional choir in the Philippines. It was composed of an all-Filipino roster ranging from faculty members and honor graduates of music conservatories, alumni of various choirs, choral conductors, composers, arrangers, and soloists.

The SMMC, together with the San Miguel Philharmonic Orchestra, was disbanded in January 2007 by the San Miguel Corporation.

== Beginnings ==
The SMMC was established in 2001 by The San Miguel Foundation for the Performing Arts, an organization owned by the San Miguel Corporation and committed to the enrichment of arts and culture in the Philippines. Since the SMMC is backed by the largest food and beverage company in the Philippines, many singers from other music groups were lured into joining the SMMC. In 2000, close to 400 people underwent a rigorous series of auditions before an international panel of experts, but only the top 40 made it to the final roster.

== Performances ==
In 2002, the SMMC participated in the 4th Taipei International Choral Festival in Taipei, Taiwan, and the Jeonju Sound Festival in Jeonju, South Korea.

In 2004, the SMMC performed an all-Filipino repertoire in "Kayumanggi" and "Klasik Kayumanggi" at the Cultural Center of the Philippines.

In 2005 the SMMC was asked to perform at Kyoto, Japan in the prestigious 7th World Symposium on Choral Music. Brian Newhouse, an American music critic who watched the performances in Kyoto, has this to say about the SMMC:

I took notes on every choir and every piece of music, and as I look back in my Symposium program booklet there’s only one page that has the word 'Wow!' written across the top. No one knew – I sure as heck didn’t – that there is any kind of choir tradition in the Philippines. But the San Miguel Master Chorale came onstage last night and blew the doors down. Thirty-eight voices with all the polish and sophistication of Dale Warland Singers, but with repertoire and vocal techniques that tap deep Filipino tribal roots. Fabulous odd rhythms, guttural chants, exotic prayer calls – all of this interwoven into the most beautiful bel canto singing a Western ear ever wanted to hear. They’re the nugget of gold I found here in Kyoto and that I’ve dropped in my pocket as I turn and head for home.

— Brian Newhouse

Also, the SMMC regularly performs with the SMPO in selected malls across Metro Manila.

Higher-ups were often positive about the choir:

I can say we got the créme de la créme here. They cannot be part of the choir if they're not good. All are degree holders, graduates of music colleges.

— Ryan Cayabyab, SMFPA's Executive and Artistic Director

This is what you call a choir where nothing is impossible. It's easy. They know the rudiments. During the first rehearsal, we finished 10 pieces. Some choir will take a week to finish one or two songs. That's how quick they are.

— Eudenice Palaruan, SMMC Conductor

== Disbandment ==
The executives of the SMC had already disbanded the SMMC and the SMPO. Late January 2007, instrumentalists of the SMPO and SMMC were summoned one by one by the executives who informed them of the non-renewal of their contracts. Many of the musicians did not get any separation pay. Insider reports say that the SMC was "more inclined" to support its four professional basketball teams. No word yet on what happened to Ryan Cayabyab, the SMFPA Executive and artistic director.

== Discography ==
=== Great Original Pilipino Music by Ryan Cayabyab ===
All songs in the album composed and arranged by Ryan Cayabyab. All songs recorded in 2001, except tracks 5, 8, and 9, which are SMMC a capella tracks and were recorded in 2004. This album received three nominations in the 18th Awit Awards aside from winning Best Musical Arrangement for Tuwing Umuulan at Kapiling Ka.

- Tuwing Umuulan at Kapiling Ka (winner, 18th Awit Awards, Best Musical Arrangement)
- Iduyan Mo
- Kahit Ika'y Panaginip Lang
- Paraisong Parisukat
- Tunay na Ligaya
- Nais Ko
- Limandipang Tao
- Tsismis
- Da Coconut Nut
- Iniibig Kita
- Paraiso
- Awit ng Pagsinta (Epithalamium) – from Ryan Cayabyab and Bienvenido Lumbera's pop-ballet Rama Hari; lyrics by Lumbera
- Hibang sa Awit – lyrics by Jose Javier Reyes

=== PASKO I ===
Festive Filipino Christmas classics, all songs arranged & conducted by Ryan Cayabyab and performed by the SMPO and the SMMC. Certified Gold Record.

- Kampana ng Simbahan
- Heto na Naman – music and lyrics by Ryan Cayabyab
- Namamasko
- Tuloy na Tuloy pa rin ang Pasko
- Sa Paskong Darating
- Maligayang Pasko at Manigong Bagong Taon (Ang Pasko ay Sumapit)
- Kumukutikutitap*
- Mano Po Ninong, Mano Po Ninang
- Noche Buena
- Heto na Naman ang Pasko**
- Maligayang Pasko**
- Pasko na Naman

* from Ryan Cayabyab and Jose Javier Reyes's musical Bituin; lyrics by Reyes
** from Ryan Cayabyab and Jose Javier Reyes's musical teleplay Pasko sa Amin; lyrics by Reyes

=== PASKO II ===
Mellow Filipino Christmas classics, all songs arranged & conducted by Ryan Cayabyab and performed by the SMPO and the SMMC. Certified Gold Record. Isang Taong Lumipas won as Best Christmas Song during the 19th Awit Awards.

- Ngayong Pasko*
- Pasko Na Sinta Ko
- Paskong Walang Hanggan*
- Himig Pasko
- Miss Kita Kung Christmas
- Isang Taong Lumipas*
- Ang Aking Pamasko
- Ang Mahalin Ka**
- Anong Gagawin Mo Ngayong Pasko – music and lyrics by Ryan Cayabyab
- Ang Naaalala Ko**
- Munting Sanggol – music and lyrics by Ryan Cayabyab
- Payapang Daigdig

* Music by Ryan Cayabyab, lyrics by Jose Javier Reyes
** From Ryan Cayabyab and Jose Javier Reyes's musical teleplay Pasko sa Amin; lyrics by Reyes

=== Spoliarium: The Opera ===
A neo-opera in three acts based on the life of renowned Filipino painter Juan Luna. Music by Ryan Cayabyab, libretto by Fides Cuyugan-Asensio.

=== The Sacred Works Of Ryan Cayabyab ===
Religious compositions of Cayabyab. Misa was his thesis composition for his graduation at the University of the Philippines College of Music. Misa 2000 was composed for and won as Original Music Composition for Dance in the 2000 Onassis International Cultural Competition in Greece. This album won as Best Religious Album in the 2004 Catholic Mass Media Awards.

=== Disc 1 ===
- Misa 2000
  - Kyrie
  - Gloria
  - Credo
  - Sanctus
  - Agnus Dei
- Te Deum

=== Disc 2 ===
- Misa
  - Kyrie
  - Gloria
  - Credo
  - Sanctus
  - Agnus Dei
- Aquesta Me Guiaba
- Aba Po, Santa Mariang Reyna
- Anima Christi

=== Beauty and the Beast ===
Songs from the Philippine run of the musical Beauty and the Beast, arranged and conducted by Ryan Cayabyab, performed by the musical's main cast with the SMPO and the SMMC.

- Home (KC Concepcion)
- Beauty and the Beast (show version by Pinky Marquez)
- A Change in Me (KC Concepcion)
- If I Can't Love Her (Jett Pangan)
- Beauty and the Beast (pop version by Luke Mijares)

=== Great Original Filipino Music from the Movies ===
Theme songs from Filipino movies from 1977 to 2002. Recorded live in July 2006 and released December of that year. Mainly featuring the SMMC, accompanied by the SMPO. Choral arrangements by Ryan Cayabyab, Jesus Carlo Merino, Ed Nepomuceno and Nathanael Arnel de Pano (the latter 2 being section leaders of the SMMC Tenors and Basses, respectively), and Eudenice Palaruan (SMMC Principal Conductor). All orchestrations by Ryan Cayabyab.

- Sana'y Wala Nang Wakas
- Kahit Isang Saglit
- Pangako
- Pangarap Na Bituin
- Pagdating Ng Panahon
- Kailangan Kita
- Hanggang Sa Dulo Ng Walang Hanggan
- Kailangan Ko'y Ikaw
- Iduyan Mo – music and lyrics by Ryan Cayabyab, from the movie "Agila" (1980)
- Hanggang Ngayon
- Tanging Yaman
- Sinasamba Kita
- Ikaw Lang Ang Mamahalin
- Gaano Kadalas Ang Minsan
- Paraisong Parisukat – music and lyrics by Ryan Cayabyab, from the movie "Masikip, Maluwang...Paraisong Parisukat" (1977)

=== Dancing In The Rain ===
An album featuring Ryan Cayabyab's talent as a pianist in his own right, accompanied by the SMPO & SMMC. Recorded live in August 2006 and released December of that year. Entire tracklist composed, arranged, and produced by Ryan Cayabyab.

- First Glance
- Feels Like This Love Affair Is Gonna Last Forever
- Frap For Two On A Beach In Cebu
- Photographs Of You And Me, Together
- Like Children Dancing In The Rain With Nothing On
- Alone, Drenched In The Red, Orange and Gold Of A Manila Sunset
- Grey Clouds! Grey Clouds! Its Beginning To Drizzle
- Its Getting More Difficult To Explain Why I Do Things The Way That I Do
- Almost Sunup And I Haven't Slept
- Last Drip To Boracay
- This Is Beginning To Sound Like An Old Song
- It Isn't The First Time Someone Left Me
- Letting Go
- Last Look

=== Future Albums ===
Other music albums are said to be in the pipeline, such as:

- A compilation of popular folk songs representative of different regions in the Philippines; e.g., "Atin Cu Pung Singsing," "Usahay, "Ay, Kalisud," and "Sarungbanggi."
- A compilation of popular novelty songs including "Ocho-ocho," "Pito-pito," and possibly "Boom Tarat-Tarat," all to be performed in symphonic style.
