= Choo Hoey =

Singaporean musician and conductor (1934–2025)

Choo Hoey (朱暉, 20 October 1934 – 11 August 2025) was a Singaporean musician and conductor. Choo founded the Singapore Symphony Orchestra and was also its first resident conductor and music director. Choo was awarded Singapore's inaugural Cultural Medallion for music in 1979.

== Early life and education ==
Choo was born in Palembang, Sumatra, Dutch East Indies on 20 October 1934, to father, Choo Seng, a Chinese migrant from Chaojhou, Guangdong, China and his mother from Nanking, Jiangsu, China.

Choo's first encounter with classical music started from listening to his father's collection of records and was drawn to the violin. His father noticed his attraction and started his lessons in violin with a Teach Yourself book. After Choo Hoey's primary education in 1945, his family migrated to Singapore in 1946 and he continued his secondary education at The Chinese High School.

In 1947, Choo Hoey started his violin training under Goh Soon Tioe. Using only two years of study in Singapore, he obtained his Grade 8 with distinction from the Associated Board of the Royal Schools of Music in London, England. Upon completing his secondary education in 1951, Choo Hoey went to the Royal Academy of Music in London to study the violin under David Martin, the French horn under Aubrey Brain, and conducting under Maurice Miles.

In 1954, Choo Hoey studied conducting under Igor Markevitch and the violin under André Gertler. In 1955, he graduated from the Royal Academy of Music, awarded the Mann's Memorial Prize and the Ernest Read Prize for conducting. In 1957, he continued his violin training at the Royal Conservatory of Brussels in Belgium where he would later start his career in the Belgian National Orchestra.

== Career ==
In 1958, Choo Hoey began his career in the Belgian National Orchestra where his debut performances with Stravinsky's The Soldier's Tale met with critical acclaim and prompted a series of guest performances and a later career as visiting conductor across Europe and South America. Choo Hoey had guest performed with over sixty orchestras throughout the world including the London Symphony Orchestra, the London Philharmonic Orchestra, the Orchestre de la Société des Concerts du Conservatoire, Tonhalle Orchester Zürich, Oslo Philharmonic and the Orchestre de la Suisse Romande. From 1968 till 1977, he was named principal conductor of the Greek National Opera and became a frequent guest conductor in the four major symphony orchestras of Greece holding numerous world premieres of contemporary Greek works, many of which were recorded with the Hellenic Radio and Television Symphony Orchestra.

In 1978, Choo Hoey was invited by the Singapore government to set up the Singapore Symphony Orchestra and become its first music director and conductor from 1979 to 1996. Choo Hoey also proposed the creation of the Singapore Symphony Chorus and along with the Singapore Symphony Orchestra, led them to their 1980 international debut in Scandinavia. Upon his retirement as music director and conductor in the Singapore Symphony Orchestra, Choo Hoey was appointed conductor emeritus in honour of his contributions and service.

== Personal life and death ==
Choo Hoey was married to Alexandra, a Greek archaeologist, and had two sons; one of is Yen Choo, an associate professor at Nanyang Technological University’s Lee Kong Chian School of Medicine. He resided in London and Athens, where he died, at his summer house.

Known as a great spotter of young talent, he was not afraid to be outspoken. His phrase was, ‘I do what I know is right, and the consequences be damned.’ His job was not to please people or be politically correct, but to be true to the music. “He never cut corners, and was as tough on himself as he was with other musical professionals.”

Choo died on 11 August 2025, at the age of 90.

== Honours ==
For his contribution to music in Singapore, Choo Hoey was awarded the Republic's inaugural Cultural Medallion (1979). He was also conferred the Public Service Star in 1982, and was made an Honorary Doctor of Letters of the National University of Singapore in 1989. In 1997, Choo Hoey was knighted with the status of Chevalier des Arts et des Lettres by the Government of France.
