= Ryan Cayabyab =

Filipino musician and composer (born 1954)

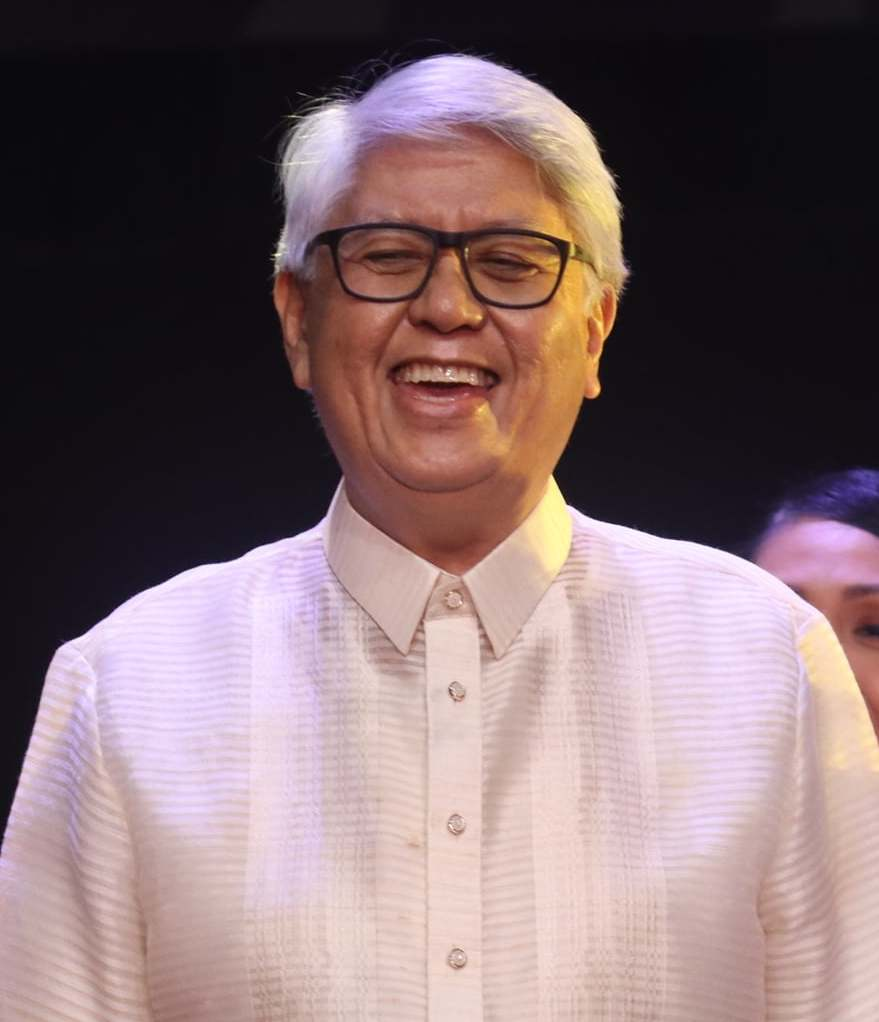
- Cayabyab in 2021
- Born: Raymundo Cipriano Pujante Cayabyab; May 4, 1954 (age 72); Santa Cruz, Manila, Philippines
- Other names: Mr. C; Maestro
- Occupations: Conductor, composer, arranger, pianist, singer
- Awards: Order of National Artists of the Philippines, Ramon Magsaysay Award
- Musical career
- Genres: OPM, chorale, musical theater, classical, sacred
- Instrument: Piano
- Years active: 1970–present

Raymundo Cipriano "Ryan" Pujante Cayabyab (Tagalog: [ˈɾajɐn kɐjɐbˈjab]; born May 4, 1954) is a Filipino musician, composer and conductor of Original Pilipino Music (OPM). He was the executive and artistic director for several years for the defunct San Miguel Foundation for the Performing Arts. He was named National Artist of the Philippines for Music in 2018.

His works range from commissioned full-length ballets, theater musicals, choral pieces, a Mass set to the unaccompanied chorus, and orchestral pieces, to commercial recordings of popular music, film scores and television specials.

He composed the Da Coconut Nut Song performed by his Smokey Mountain band, Cayabyab's current project includes the Ryan Cayabyab Singers (RCS), a group of seven singers comparable to Smokey Mountain in the early 1990s. After FreemantleMedia decided not to renew the Philippine Idol franchise, Cayabyab transferred to rival show Pinoy Dream Academy, replacing Jim Paredes as the show's headmaster. PDA 2 started on June 14, 2008. He also became the chairman of the board of judges for GMA Network's musical-reality show To The Top.

He is the executive director of the PhilPop MusicFest Foundation Inc., the organization behind the Philippine Popular Music Festival.

== Early life and education ==
Raymundo Cipriano Pujante Cayabyab was born on May 4, 1954, in Santa Cruz, Manila, Philippines. At age four, Cayabyab was learning piano from music students' boarders while accompanying his mother in the UP campus. He was also often brought to music rehearsals in the Abelardo Hall by his mother. When Cayabyab was six years old, his mother died due to cancer at the age of 43. According to Cayabyab later in life, that his mother discouraged him and his sibling from pursuing a musical career due to hardship his mother herself experienced as a musician.

After his mother's death, Cayabyab stumbled upon a box full of piano pieces left behind by UP music students, and used the manuscript to teach himself play the piano. By age 14, he was able to perform Johann Sebastian Bach's preludes and a solo piano reduction of George Gershwin's Rhapsody in Blue.

Graduating from high school, at age 15 he was able to secure a job as a pianist of a bank's chorale group. His earnings would later fund his collegiate studies. Cayabyab initially took up a bachelor's degree in business administration major in accounting at the University of the Philippines, Diliman, as a way to honor his mother's request.

In 1972, Cayabyab became involved with the Philippine Madrigal Singers and became acquainted with Victor Laurel, a film and theater actor at the time, who often worked with actress-singer Nora Aunor. Senator Salvador Laurel, taking notice of Cayabyab's talent, convinced him to pursue collegiate studies in music and offered him a scholarship. With the consent of his father, Cayabyab moved to the UP College of Music the following year.

Cayabyab took ten years to graduate from the UP College of Music due to doing tours within that period. He earned a Bachelor of Music, Major in Theory degree in 1983.

== Career ==
After graduating from college, he became a full-time professor for the Department of Composition and Music Theory in the UP Diliman for almost two decades. At the turn of the 21st century, Cayabyab was considering a move to migrate abroad with his family. Danding Cojuangco (President of the San Miguel Corporation) offered him a position to produce and perform new music to add to the Philippine music scene; Cayabyab accepted the offer as executive and artistic director of the San Miguel Foundation for the Performing Arts. He served there for several years until the sudden closure of the foundation.

As music director, conductor and accompanist, Cayabyab has performed in the United States with Philippine music figures, at venues including Avery Fisher Hall in the Lincoln Center in New York City; Carnegie Hall (both the Main and Recital halls) in New York; the Kennedy Center and the Washington Convention Center in Washington, D.C.; the Shrine in Los Angeles; the Orpheum in Vancouver; and Circus Maximus of Caesars Palace on the Las Vegas Strip.

He has traveled as music director in most of the Southeast Asian cities, in the cities of Australia as well as in Germany, France, Spain, the Netherlands, Japan, and the United States. He has worked in the same shows with Sammy Davis Jr. and Frank Sinatra, as well as conducted the Philippine Philharmonic Orchestra for special performances of American jazz singer Diane Schuur and pianist Jim Chappel.

He has performed as music director in command performances for King Hasan II in Rabat, Morocco, King Juan Carlos and Queen Sophia of Spain in Manila, King Fahd of Saudi Arabia in Tangiers, Queen Beatrix at the Noordeinde Palace in the Netherlands, and U.S. President Bill Clinton in Boston, Massachusetts.

In Manila, he has conducted the Philippine Philharmonic Orchestra, at the Cultural Center of the Philippines for a concert of Philippine and American contemporary music; and the Manila Chamber Orchestra for a concert of his original works.

Cayabyab only wrote three songs in the 2010s, due to focusing on promoting Original Pilipino Music for most of the period. In 2020, due to the idle time caused by the COVID-19 pandemic, Cayabyab was able to write at least ten songs in 2020 alone, two of which was made available in Spotify.

=== Advertising ===
Cayabyab composed a jingle for an advertisement of the soft drink brand Sarsi, entitled "Sarsi: Angat sa Iba" (Sarsi: Different from Others) in 1989.

Under collaboration with Philippine fruit juice brand Locally, Cayabyab did the composition for "Prutas Pilipinas" a 2020 contemporary folk song which featured fruits cultivated in the Philippines. The lyrics was written by Noel Ferrer and the song was performed by The Company.

=== Television ===
Ryan Ryan Musikahan, the television show, has won a total of fourteen awards as Best Television Musical Show and for Cayabyab, the Best Show Host in various television award-giving bodies. Likewise, as an artist, producer, arranger, and composer, he has won a total of eighteen awards from the recording industry for various commercial recordings. He has produced albums of the Filipino teen group Smokey Mountain, Broadway and West End's diva, Lea Salonga, and Spanish singer Julio Iglesias.

In 1987 he rearranged the classical tinged version of ABS-CBN jingle (composed by Dominic Salustiano), which was used in the network's Station ID from 1987 to 1995. He also composed the "ABS-CBN Millennium Overture", which was used in the ABS-CBN New Millennium Station ID in 2000.

=== Theater ===
His theater musicals El filibusterismo (1993) and Noli Me Tángere (1995) have won acclaim and have been performed extensively in the cities of Japan in 1994 and 1996. They received a special NHK broadcast in November 1996, and in Kuala Lumpur in the same year. Another musicale, Magnificat, has had nearly 200 performances.

His other musicals include Katy (words by Jose Javier Reyes), Alikabok, Ilustrado and the classic pop-ballet Rama Hari (words by 2006 National Artist for Literature Bienvenido Lumbera). Katy would become Caybyab's most famous musical in the 1980s.

His latest opera, Spoliarium (libretto by Fides Cuyugan-Asensio), premiered in February 2003 at the Tanghalang Nicanor Abelardo of the CCP, and is to be followed by another opera also with Asensio, Mariang Makiling at Ang Mga Nuno sa Punso (Maria Makiling and the Old Men on the Mound), with music also by Ryan Cayabyab.

In 2011, he composed for the concert Ageless Passion (libretto by Kristian Jeff Agustin), which was commissioned by the family of retired Chief Justice Artemio V. Panganiban, and staged at the Meralco theater. In 2016, "Ageless Passion" was staged as a full musical, reuniting Cayabyab and Agustin.

LORENZO, a musical on the life of St. Lorenzo Ruiz, also showcases music composed and arranged by Cayabyab. LORENZO started its runs in September 2013.

=== Other ===
Cayabyab composed "Mabuhay", the opening song of Miss Universe 1994 pageant, held in Manila, Philippines.

In 2005, Cayabyab composed the official soundtrack for the 23rd edition of the Southeast Asian Games in Manila.

In 2006, Cayabyab signed on as a resident judge for the first season of Philippine Idol, offering critiques for the contestants on the reality-talent show. He was chosen by the top guns of Philippine Idol, while the other two judges, Pilita Corrales and the late Francis Magalona, had to undergo auditions. He also composed the themes of TV Patrol and The World Tonight in 1993 and it was used until 1996 for TV Patrol (The World Tonight has since been using his composed theme from 1996).

In 2019, Cayabyab composed the theme song for the 30th edition of the Southeast Asian Games, "We Win as One"; with lyrics by playwright Floy Quintos, and sung by Lea Salonga.

=== Achievements ===
Ryan Cayabyab is 2004's Gawad CCP para sa Sining in Music. On February 2, 1999, he was selected as one of the 100 awardees of the CCP Centennial Honors for the Arts . He became the first recipient of the Antonio C. Barreiro Achievement Award on May 4, 1996, for significant and lasting contributions to the growth and development of Filipino music. Likewise, on June 18, 1996, Awit Awards, the recording industry awards, awarded him a Lifetime Achievement Award for "invaluable contribution and outstanding achievements in the promotion and development of Filipino music." The University of the Philippines Alumni Association has conferred upon him the Professional Award in music for the year 1998. In 2012, Ryan won the MYX Magna Award in the Myx Music Awards 2012 for his achievements in music and in the OPM industry.

The Music School of Ryan Cayabyab specializes in developing outstanding performance artists is run by Emmy Cayabyab, Ryan's wife. Established in 1986, the music studio has trained a whole generation of young singer-performers who have become nationally known Filipino performing artists.

=== SMFPA ===
Ryan Cayabyab was also the executive and artistic director of the San Miguel Foundation for the Performing Arts for several years. He was the conductor of the San Miguel Philharmonic Orchestra (SMPO) and the San Miguel Master Chorale (SMMC). Under his direction, the SMPO and the SMMC recorded seven albums to date: Great Filipino Love Songs (2004), Great Original Pilipino Music by Ryan Cayabyab (2004), The Sacred Works of Ryan Cayabyab (2004), Pasko I and Pasko II (2005), Great Original Pilipino Music from the Movies (2006), and Dancing in the Rain (2006).

=== National Artist of the Philippines ===
In 2018, Ryan Cayabyab was proclaimed National Artist of the Philippines for his contribution to Filipino music.

=== Ramon Magsaysay Award Foundation ===
In September 2019, the Ramon Magsaysay Award was presented to Cayabyab – the only Filipino among the honorees in 2019 – recognizing him for "showing us all that music can indeed instill pride and joy, and unify people across the many barriers that divide them."

== Personal life ==
Cayabyab married Emmy Punsalan in 1985. They have two children.

Cayabyab is a Roman Catholic, and has written various masses and other religious compositions throughout his career, including the song "Say Yes to Life" which he wrote with Steve Latorre and Louie C. Reyes for the Pro-Life Philippines advocacy group in 1988.

== Discography ==
=== As composer ===
Feature films

| Year | Title | Director | Notes | Ref |
|---|---|---|---|---|
| 1973 | Love Song | Zenaida Amador | | |
| 1973 | Ophelia and Paris | Celia Diaz-Laurel | | |
| 1977 | The Captive Virgins | Mario O'Hara | | |
| 1980 | Aguila | Eddie Romero | | |
| 1982 | Desire | Eddie Romero | | |
| 1983 | Of the Flesh | Marilou Diaz-Abaya | | |
| 1987 | Hari sa Hari, Lahi sa Lahi | Eddie Romero; Hsiao Lang; Lili Chou | With Wang Liping | |
| 1988 | Misis Mo, Misis Ko | Carlos Siguion-Reyna | | |
| 1988 | Whiteforce | Eddie Romero | | |
| 1991 | Hihintayin Kita sa Langit | Carlos Siguion-Reyna | | |
| 1992 | Ikaw Pa Lang ang Minahal | Carlos Siguion-Reyna | | |
| 1994 | The Maggie de la Riva Story (God... Why Me?) | Carlo J. Caparas | With Raul Mitra | |
| 1995 | Closer to Home | Joseph Nobile | | |
| 1995 | Harvest Home | Carlos Siguion-Reyna | | |
| 1997 | Ligaya ang Itawag Mo sa Akin | Carlos Siguion-Reyna | | |
| 2016 | Ignacio de Loyola | Paolo Dy | Score | |
| 2017 | Ang Larawan | Loy Arcenas | Full-length musical | |

Studio albums

| Year | Album | Label | Notes and remarks | Ref |
|---|---|---|---|---|
| 1981 | One | | Arranged by Ryan Cayabyab. Collection of Filipino song in a capella. Includes original composition "Kay Ganda Ng Ating Musika". | |
| 1991 | Paraiso | Sony BMG | Arranged by Ryan Cayabyab. Performed by Smokey Mountain | |
| 1991 | One Christmas | Ivory | Arranged by Ryan Cayabyab. Collection of Filipino Christmas songs and carols in a capella. Includes original Christmas composition "Kumukutikutitap" | |

== Filmography ==
=== Television ===
| Year | Title | Role | Network | Notes | Ref |
|---|---|---|---|---|---|
| 1988–1995 | Ryan Ryan Musikahan | Host | ABS-CBN | | |
| 2006 | Philippine Idol | Judge | ABC | | |
| 2008 | Pinoy Dream Academy Season Two | Headmaster | ABS-CBN | | |

== Awards ==
Ryan Cayabyab is a recipient of the Pro Ecclesia et Pontifice in 2013. Pope Francis awarded him the highest papal award for Laity for his many contributions in the field of religious-themed compositions and sacred works. Among his ecclesiastical works are, "Eclesiastes" for choir and piano, his first large religious composition; "Misa" for unaccompanied choir; stage musicals like "Magnificat," "Birhen ng Caysasay" and, "Lorenzo;" and church songs such as or "I Believe in Peace," "The Prophet," "Asin ng Pamayanan," "Live Christ, Share Christ," and "Icthus" in St. John's Mass.

He is also a TOYM (Ten Outstanding Young Men) awardee for contemporary Filipino music in 1978. He won the Grand Prize award at the first Metro Manila Popular Music Festival for the song "Kay Ganda ng Ating Musika".

- 2001, Ryan Cayabyab is a laureate of the Onassis International Cultural Competitions (2nd Prize), having won for original music composition for dance.
- As of 2006, he has won three international Grand Prix awards for his compositions; in the First Seoul Song Festival, in the Voice of Asia Song Festival in the former U.S.S.R., and in the Tokyo Music Festival. *He won the Jingle of the Year award from the Philippine advertising industry
- Bronze Awardee at the New York Film and Television Awards.
- He has won a total of ten best movie score awards from the various film award-giving bodies.

He received in September 2019 the prestigious Ramon Magsaysay Award, highlighting "his compositions and performances that have defined and inspired Filipino popular music across generations...", being cited, among other achievements, "that have defined and inspired Filipino popular music across generations."

| Year | Award giving body | Category | Nominated work | Results |
|---|---|---|---|---|
| 1980 | Gawad Urian | Best Music (Pinakamahusay na Musika) | "Iduyan Mo" (Aguila) | Nominated |
| 1983 | Gawad Urian | Best Musical Score | Of the Flesh | Won |
| 1988 | Gawad Urian | Best Musical Score | Misis Mo, Misis Ko | Won |
| 1991 | FAMAS Awards | Best Music | Hihintayin Kita sa Langit | Won |
| 1992 | Gawad Urian | Best Musical Score | Ikaw Pa Lang ang Minahal | Won |
| 1993 | Metro Manila Film Festival | Best Music | Kung Mawawala Ka Pa | Won |
| 1993 | Metro Manila Film Festival | Best Original Song | "Kung Mawawala Ka Pa" | Won |
| 2012 | MYX Music Awards | MYX Magna Award | —N/a | Won |
| 2018 | Asia Pacific Screen Awards | Best Original Score | Ang Larawan | Nominated |
| 2020 | 5th Wish 107.5 Music Awards | The KDR Icon of Musical Excellence Award | —N/a | Won |
