= Singapore Bible College =

Evangelical Bible college in Singapore

- Established: 1952
- Principal: Rev. Dr. Patrick Fung (Aug 2026)
- Students: 500
- Location: Singapore; 1.3255°N 103.8131°E
- Website: www.sbc.edu.sg

Singapore Bible College (SBC) is an evangelical Bible college in Singapore. SBC has over 500 students, representing 25 countries. The current principal is Rev. Dr. Patrick Fung.

== History ==
Singapore Bible College was established in 1952. It was founded by "pastors and leaders from Anglican, Baptist, Methodist, Presbyterian and independent churches, with the support of the Chinese Church Union, Christian Nationals Evangelism Commission (CNEC) and the Overseas Missionary Fellowship (OMF)." According to former principal Albert Ting, it was founded "to uphold the authority of God's Word at the time when the Scriptures were under severe attack from the liberals of that era." Ting asserts that SBC is a "living testimony to the effectiveness and authority of God's Word as we expound a Bible-based theological education."

SBC consists of four schools: two Schools of Theology in English and Chinese language respectively; a School of Church Music and a School of Counselling. The college has a vocal group, the Singapore Bible College Vox.

SBC is committed to being "Christ-centred," "Bible-based," "Church-oriented," "Missions-directed," and "Context-relevant".

== Accreditation ==
Singapore Bible College is accredited by the Asia Theological Association to offer the following degrees:

=== Chinese ===
- Master of Divinity
- Master of Arts
- Graduate Diploma in Christian Studies
- Diploma in Christian Studies

=== English ===
- Master of Divinity
- Master of Arts in Biblical Studies
- Master of Arts in Intercultural Studies
- Graduate Diploma in Intercultural Studies
- Graduate Diploma in Christian Studies
- Advanced Diploma in Ministry
- Featured Courses

=== Advanced Studies ===
- Doctor of Philosophy (bilingual)
- Doctor of Ministry (bilingual)
- Master of Theology (bilingual)

=== Counselling ===
- Master of Arts in Counselling (also accredited by Singapore Association for Counselling)
- Graduate Diploma in Counselling
