= Singapore Symphony Orchestra =

Symphony orchestra based in Singapore

- Founded: 1979; 47 years ago
- Location: Downtown Core, Singapore
- Concert hall: Esplanade – Theatres on the Bay; Victoria Theatre and Concert Hall
- Music director: Hannu Lintu
- Website: www.sso.org.sg

The Singapore Symphony Orchestra (SSO) is a symphony orchestra based in Singapore. Its principal concert venue is the Esplanade – Theatres on the Bay. The orchestra also gives concerts at the Victoria Theatre and Concert Hall, and performs over 60 concerts per year. The SSO was established in 1979 with Choo Hoey as its music director and resident conductor. Its current music director is Hannu Lintu. The orchestra is part of the Singapore Symphony Group, which also manages the Singapore Symphony Choruses, the Singapore National Youth Orchestra (SNYO), the Singapore International Piano Festival and the biennial National Piano and Violin Competition. It achieved third place in 2021 for Gramophone's Orchestra of the Year Award, and made the list of the BBC Music Magazine's Top 23 Best Orchestras in the World in 2022.

== History ==
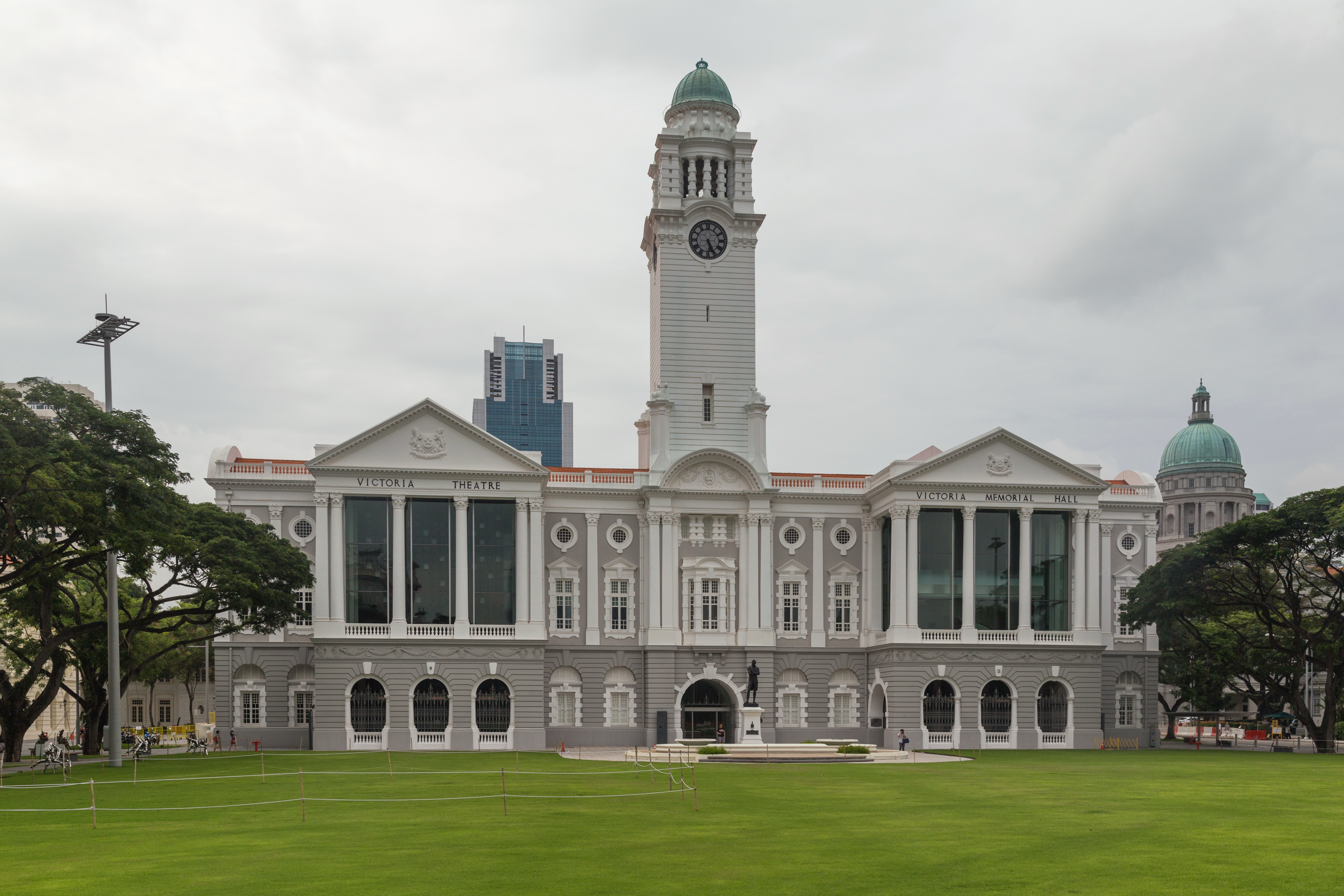
Victoria Theatre and Concert Hall, home of the Singapore Symphony Orchestra since 1980

Several orchestras were formed in Singapore in the colonial period and after independence. One of these, also named the Singapore Symphony Orchestra, was formed in 1945 by the Scottish composer Erik Chisholm in his capacity as Entertainments National Service Association (ENSA) music director for South East Asia. Some of its members were from the British army or air force bands, and though it was short-lived, it gave over fifty concerts and played with soloists such as the violinist Szymon Goldberg. Subsequently, until 1979, all orchestras in Singapore were composed largely of amateur musicians. Orchestras of the early periods included the orchestras of Singapore Musical Society, Singapore Chamber Ensemble, Singapore Youth Orchestra, as well as the short-lived Singapore National Orchestra formed by National Theatre Trust in the 1970s.

In 1973, at the opening ceremony of the Japanese Garden in Jurong, the then-defence minister Dr. Goh Keng Swee described the absence of a professional symphony orchestra in Singapore as "a minor scandal". An initial proposal to establish a national symphony orchestra was not accepted, as it did not plan for the inclusion of Singaporean musicians. In 1977, a largely amateur Singapore Philharmonic Orchestra was formed under the leadership of Yoshinao Osawa. Its success spurred further interest in the idea of a national symphony orchestra. After consulting with conductor Choo Hoey about the feasibility of setting up an orchestra that would include Singaporean musicians, Goh Keng Swee persuaded the Cabinet to support the establishment of a professional orchestra. The orchestra would be supported by public funds, and was intended to serve as a flagship arts company for the enrichment of the local culture scene. In 1978, with the support of the Cabinet, the Singapore Symphony Orchestra was registered as Singapore Symphonia Co. and rehearsals began in December, with 8 Singaporean members and 27 members from overseas.

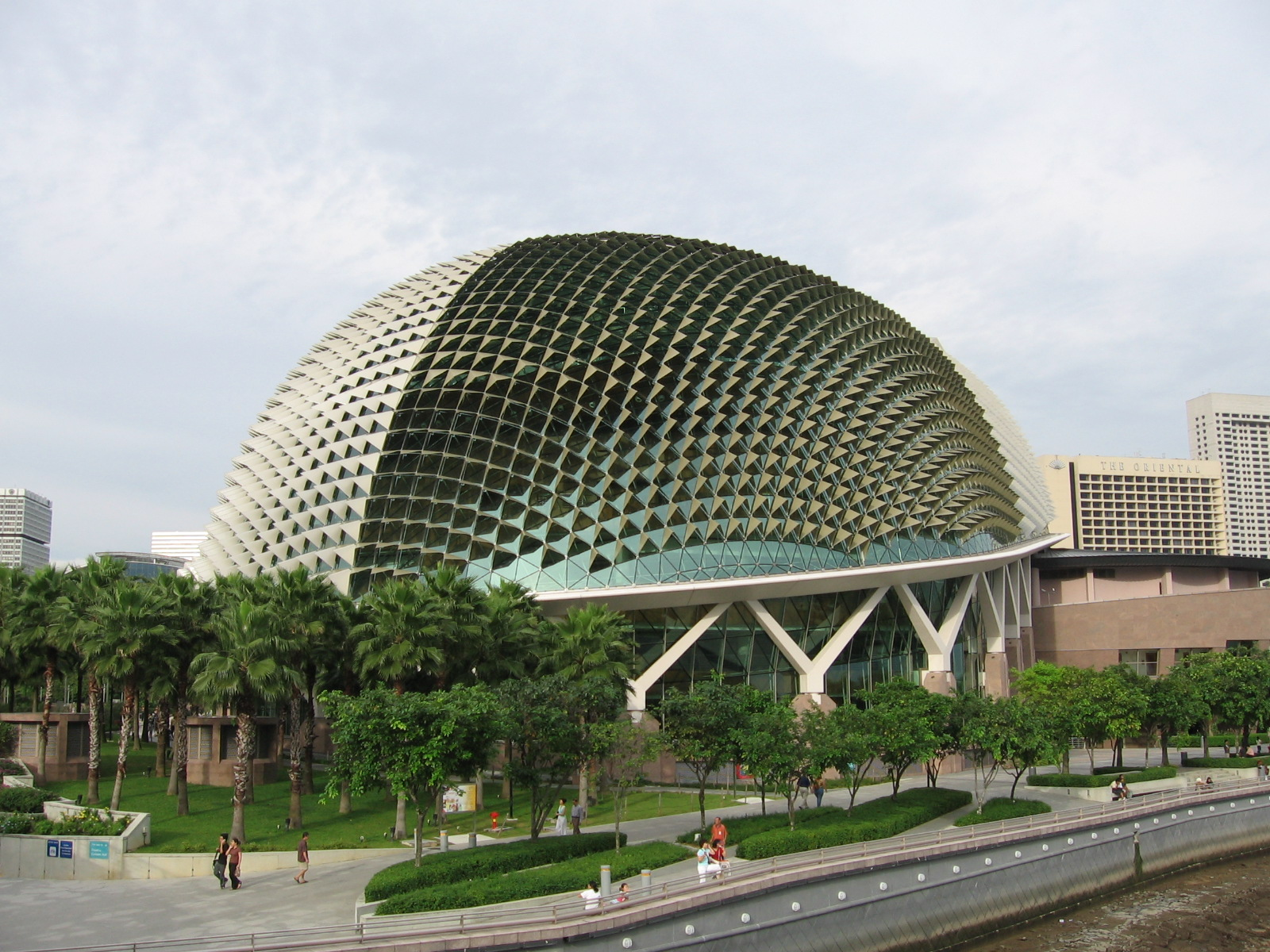
Esplanade, main performance venue for SSO since 2003

The SSO made its debut with its first performance at the Singapore Conference Hall on 24 January 1979. The first session it performed was the Singaporean national anthem "Majulah Singapura" with its first resident conductor Choo Hoey. The orchestra had 41 members, 14 of whom were Singaporean. The Singapore Symphony Chorus was then formed in 1980. In 1980, the Victoria Theatre and Concert Hall became home to the orchestra.

In 1983, the SSO gave its first outdoor concert at The Istana. Later, in 1985, the SSO made its first European tour, visiting ten cities within Scandinavia, and also performed at the Singapore Botanic Gardens for the first time, conducted by Lim Yau. From 1986 to 1991 (and briefly in 2001), the SSO also created a series of concerts entitled New Music Forum which focused on highlighting Singaporean composers. Additionally, in 1995, Okko Kamu was named principal guest conductor of the SSO. The SSO expanded to its target of about 90 musicians by the early 1990s.

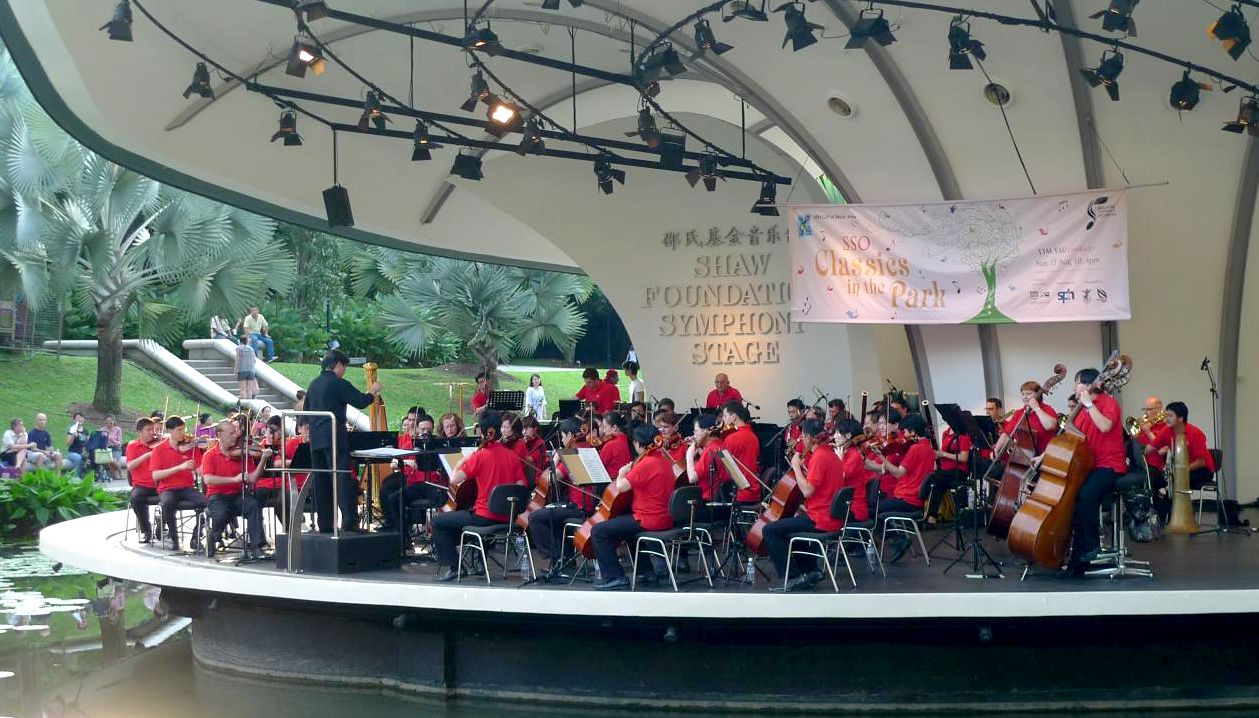
Singapore Symphony Orchestra concert at the Singapore Botanic Gardens

Choo Hoey stepped down as music director in July 1996 and took up the title of conductor emeritus, while Lan Shui became the orchestra's next music director in 1997. In 1999, the SSO performed at the Singapore National Day parade. In 2003, the orchestra moved to its current performance venue, the Esplanade.

In January 2016, the SSO took over management and operational responsibility for the Singapore National Youth Orchestra, which until then was managed by the Ministry of Education.

In January 2019, Lan Shui stood down as music director, and was given the title of conductor laureate. In 2019, the SSO celebrated its 40th anniversary with a gala concert.

Hans Graf first guest-conducted the SSO in 2015, and returned for a further guest engagement in 2018. In July 2019, the SSO announced the appointment of Graf as its new chief conductor, effective with the 2020/2021 season. The orchestra elevated Graf to the post of music director in 2022, which he held until the close of the 2025/2026 season.

As of the 2026/2027 season, Hannu Lintu is music director of the SSO. Lintu first guest-conducted the SSO in 2017

== Music directors / chief conductors ==
- Choo Hoey (music director, 1979–1996)
- Lan Shui (music director, 1997–2019)
- Hans Graf (chief conductor, 2020–2022; music director, 2022–2026)
- Hannu Lintu (music director, 2026–present)

== Concerts and repertoire ==
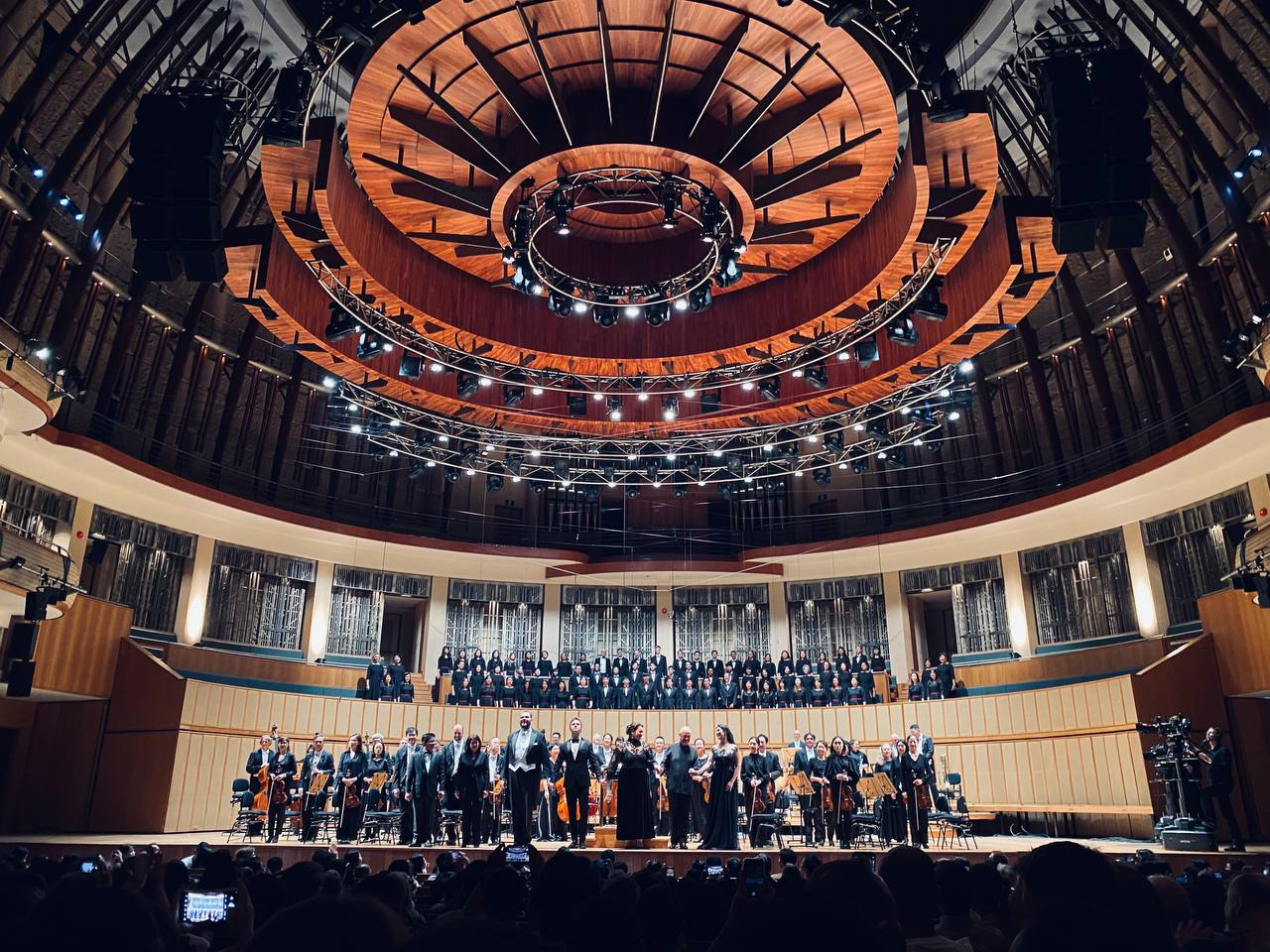
A concert at the Esplanade Concert Hall

The main performing venue for the orchestra is the Esplanade Concert Hall, but concerts are also regularly held at the Victoria Concert Hall. It gives regular free performances and lunch time concerts at venues such as the Botanic Gardens and Gardens by the Bay. It also performs in schools and colleges and has a Community Outreach programme to promote classical music to the wider community. The orchestra has toured around the world; notable concerts include performances at the Berliner Philharmonie, New York's Avery Fisher Hall, Beijing's Poly Theatre, and The Proms in London. The orchestra's debut tour of Australia in February 2025 consisted of concerts in Sydney, Melbourne and Brisbane.

The repertoire of the orchestra includes Western classical music ranging from early baroque to contemporary classical music as well as Chinese works composed or arranged for a Western orchestra. This is reflected in the program for its inaugural concert on 24 January 1979 that included Rossini's overture to The Barber of Seville, Beethoven's Piano Concerto No. 5 (soloist Ong Lip Tat), Charles Ives' The Unanswered Question, Schubert's Unfinished Symphony and the Chinese orchestral piece Dance of the Yao People.

== Recordings ==
The SSO has made many recordings with BIS Records and other labels. These include the first recording of the complete cycle of Alexander Tcherepnin's six piano concertos and four symphonies on BIS. Other releases include recordings of works by Rachmaninov released in 2012 and 2013 with Yevgeny Sudbin, and the 2007 recordings of Claude Debussy's La Mer.

Starting in 2023, the Singapore Symphony Orchestra (SSO) began collaborating with the Pentatone label, releasing albums such as Vivaldi: Four Seasons & Locatelli: Harmonic Labyrinth (2023), Butterfly Lovers & Paganini (2024) and Mozart: Violin Concertos with artist-in-residence Chloe Chua as soloist. Butterfly Lovers & Paganini and Mozart: Violin Concertos both reached the No. 1 spot of Apple Music's global Classical Top 100 chart after release.

Other notable recordings include Kozłowski: Requiem (2024) performed with the Singapore Symphony Chorus & Youth Choir, featuring a reconstructed version of Józef Kozłowski's Requiem from 1798 that was edited by conductor Hans Graf, and Bennett/Duke Violin Concertos (2025) with Chloë Hanslip and Andrew Litton featuring Robert Russell Bennett's Violin Concerto and Hexapoda as well as Vernon Duke's Violin Concerto.

In 2026, the orchestra released Symbiosis · Tribute to Bill Evans (2026), a Pentatone album recorded at the Esplanade Concert Hall in Singapore, featuring works by Palle Mikkelborg, Thomas Clausen, and Claus Ogerman, including a reconstructed version of Ogerman’s Symbiosis commissioned by the orchestra. With OUR Recordings, the SSO also released A Hero's Life, with Hans Graf conducting Richard Strauss's Don Juan and Ein Heldenleben.

== See also ==
- Music of Singapore
