= Singapore at the 2005 SEA Games =

Singapore at the 2005 Southeast Asian Games
- IOC code: SIN
- NOC: Singapore National Olympic Council
- Website: www.singaporeolympics.com (in English)

in the Manila
- Competitors: 363
- Flag bearer: Remy Ong
- Medals Ranked 6th: Gold 42 Silver 32 Bronze 55 Total 129

Southeast Asian Games appearances (overview)
- 1959; 1961; 1965; 1967; 1969; 1971; 1973; 1975; 1977; 1979; 1981; 1983; 1985; 1987; 1989; 1991; 1993; 1995; 1997; 1999; 2001; 2003; 2005; 2007; 2009; 2011; 2013; 2015; 2017; 2019; 2021; 2023; 2025; 2027; 2029

Singapore participated at the 2005 Southeast Asian Games in the Philippines under the IOC country code SIN. Sending a delegation of 658 athletes and 291 officials, the third largest it had ever sent to the games, the Singapore team set its target at 35 gold medals, five more than the haul won at the 2003 Southeast Asian Games held in Vietnam.

The selection criteria for participating in the games was set strictly based on their ability to win at least a bronze medal for the country. Hence, the Singapore National Olympic Council asked the various sporting federation bodies to nominate their candidates based on their performance between 1 March 2005 to 24 June 2005, with achievements above the bronze medal scores in previous games. While this process was relatively smooth for some sports such as swimming, table tennis and badminton, it raised issues on management and competence for others like athletics, chess and squash.

The Ministry of Community Development produced a theme song, Live Our Dreams, composed by Thomas Schönberg and sung by Kit Chan, to inspire the Singapore contingent in the games. The Chief of mission to the games was Oon Jin Teik.

== Medals ==
Rank	Nation	Gold	Silver	Bronze	Total
1	Aquatics – Swimming	13	9	11	33
2	Sailing	7	3	1	11
3	Table Tennis	6	2	2	10
4	Shooting	3	4	5	12
5	Athletics	3	1	4	8
6	Gymnastics	2	2	0	4
7	Bodybuilding	2	0	1	3
8	Pencak Silat	1	3	7	11
9	Billiards and Snooker	1	2	5	8
10	Wushu	1	1	2	4
11	Fencing	1	0	2	3
12	Triathlon	1	0	1	2
13	Aquatics – Water Polo	1	0	0	1
14	Bowling	0	2	2	4
15	Golf	0	1	1	2
15	Rowing	0	1	1	2
17	Badminton	0	1	0	1
18	Chess	0	0	3	3
19	Karatedo	0	0	2	2
19	Petanque	0	0	2	2
21	Archery	0	0	1	1
Totals (21 entries)		42	32	53	127

=== Gold ===
- Aquatics
  - Men's 400 m freestyle – Lee Jiann Yow Lionel (heats: 4:10.67, finals: 4:00.51)
  - Men's 4 × 100 m freestyle relay – Chay Jung Jun Mark, Su Shirong Jeffrey, Tan Lee Yu Gary, Tay Zhi Rong Bryan (3:27.56)
  - Men's 4 × 200 m freestyle relay – Chay Jung Jun Mark, Cheah Mingzhe Marcus, Tan Lee Yu Gary, Tay Zhi Rong Bryan (7:35.85, new games record)
  - Men's water polo team tops round-robin tournament with a full 10 points.
  - Women's 50 m freestyle – Joscelin Yeo (heats: 1:08.20, finals: 26.13, new games record)
  - Women's 100 m freestyle – Joscelin Yeo (heats: 1:00.48, finals: 56.41s)
  - Women's 100 m breaststroke – Joscelin Yeo (heats: 1:13.69, finals: 1:11.74)
  - Women's 100 m backstroke – Tao Li (heats: 1:08.20, finals: 1:03.83 new games record)
  - Women's 100 m butterfly – Joscelin Yeo (heats: 1:03.59, finals: 59.91 new games record)
  - Women's 200 m backstroke – Tao Li (heats: 2:25.53, finals: 2:17.55)
  - Women's 200 m breaststroke – Nicolette Teo (heats: 2:38.17, finals: 2:34.56)
  - Women's 200 m butterfly – Tao Li (heats: 2:21.96, finals: 2:14.11, new games record)
  - Women's 200 m individual medley – Joscelin Yeo (2:19.23)
  - Women's 4 × 100 m medley relay – Ho Shu Yong, Tao Li, Nicolette Teo, Joscelin Yeo (4:14.49, new games record)
- Athletics
  - Men's discus – Wong Tuck Yim James (55.11m)
  - Women's discus – Du Xianhui (49.48m)
  - Women's shot put – Zhang Guirong (17.40m)
- Billiards and Snooker
  - Men's 9-ball pool singles – Chan Keng Kwang (defeated ?)
- Bodybuilding
  - 65 kg – Ibrahim bin Sihat
  - 75 kg – Chua Ling Fung Simon
- Fencing
  - Women's foil team – Ng Yi Lin Ruth, Ser Xue Ling Serene, Tay Yu Ling and Wong Ye Han Cheryl (defeated Vietnam 44–39)
- Gymnastics
  - Women's artistic individual floor exercise – Tay Xi Hui Nicole
  - Women's artistic team – Lee Wen Ling, Lee Wen Si, Lim Heem Wei, Nur Atikah Nabilah Binte Muhammad Jufrie, Tay Jia Hui Tabitha, Tay Xi Hui Nicole
- Pencak silat
  - Men's tanding class H – Mohd Imran (defeated Indonesia 5–0)
- Sailing
  - Men's 420 open – Xu Yuan Zhen and Wong Ming Ho Justin
  - Men's 420 boys – Teo Wee Chin and Terence Koh
  - Men's laser – Soh Khyan Tat Maximillian
  - Men's laser radial – Lo Man Yi
  - Women's 420 girls – Tam Shiu Wun Siobhan and Liu Xiaodan Dawn
  - Women's 470 women – Toh Liying and Tok Lee Ching
  - Women's optimist girls – Griselda Khng
- Shooting
  - Men's trap – Choo Choon Seng
  - Men's trap team – Choo Choon Seng, Kwa Eng Cheong Michael, Lee Wung Yew
  - Men's double trap – Mohd Zain Amat (173)
- Table tennis
  - Men's doubles – Cai Xiaoli and Yang Zi (defeated Indonesia 3–0)
  - Men's team – Cai Xiaoli, Clarence Lee, Henry Seah, Jason Ho, Yang Zi (defeated Vietnam 3–2)
  - Women's singles – Zhang Xueling (defeated Singapore)
  - Women's doubles – Li Jiawei and Zhang Xueling (defeated Indonesia 3–0)
  - Women's team – Jenn Lim, Li Jiawei, Tan Paey Fern, Yan Xu, Zhang Xueling (defeated Thailand 3–1)
  - Mixed doubles – Yang Zi and Zhang Xueling (defeated Singapore 3–1)
- Triathlon
  - Men's 1.5 km Swim, 40 km Bike, 10 km Run – Cheng Jing Hean (1:58:41.14)
- Wushu
  - Taijiquan (taijijian) – Goh Qiu Bin (18.56)

=== Silver ===
- Aquatics
  - Men's 100 m backstroke – Chay Jung Jun Mark (heats: 1:00.69, finals: 58.49)
  - Men's 200 m backstroke – Tan Lee Yu Gary (heats: 2:10.15, finals: 2:07.26)
  - Women's 50 m freestyle – Ho Shu Yong (heats: 1:08.20, finals: 26.61)
  - Women's 800 m freestyle – Quah Ting Wen (heats: 1:00.69, finals: 9:02.20)
  - Women's 100 m breaststroke – Nicolette Teo (heats: 1:13.89, finals: 1:11.80)
  - Women's 200 m individual medley – Nicolette Teo (2:22.86)
  - Women's 400 m individual medley – Bernardette Lee (heats: 5:05.32, finals: 5:00.27)
  - Women's 4 × 100 m freestyle relay – Ruth Ho, Ho Shu Yong, Lynette Ng, Joscelin Yeo (3:55.53)
  - Women's 4 × 200 m freestyle relay – Ho Shu Yong, Mylene Ong, Quah Ting Wen, Joscelin Yeo (8:34.75)
- Athletics
  - Women's Shot put – Du Xianhui: 17.37m
- Badminton
  - Women's team – lost to Thailand 2–3
- Billiards and Snooker
  - Men's snooker doubles – E Boon Aun Keith and Puan Yi Wei Alex: lost to Thailand 1–3
  - Women's 8-Ball Pool Singles – Hoe Shu Wah
- Bowling
  - Men's singles – Remy Ong
  - Women's singles – Tan Shi Hua Jazreel (3689)
- Golf
  - Men's team – Choo Tze Huang, Goh Kun Yang, Leong Kit Wai and Quek Peng Xiang
- Gymnastics
  - Women's artistic individual balanced beam – Tay Jia Hui Tabitha (7.96)
  - Women's artistic individual uneven bars – Tay Xi Hui Nicole (7.937)
- Rowing
  - Men's single sculls – Elsie Lim
- Pencak Silat
  - Men's tanding class G – Abdul Kadir
  - Men's tanding class I – Mohd Yusoff (lost to Vietnam 1–4)
  - Women's regu – Fatmah Abdul Halid, Raden Mas and Nor Dianawati
- Sailing
  - Men's Hobie 16 – Huang Jinjie Melcom and Chung Pei Quan
  - Men's optimist Boys – Lee Teik Ren Sean
- Shooting
  - Men's practical pistol – Chow Wei An
  - Men's practical pump shotgun – Lawrence Wee
  - Men's trap – Lee Wung Yew
  - Women's 10m air rifle – Vanessa Yong
- Table tennis
  - Women's singles – Li Jiawei (lost to Singapore)
  - Mixed doubles – Cai Xiaoli and Li Jiawei (lost to Singapore 1–3)
- Wushu
  - Qiangshu – Khor Poh Chin (9.2)

=== Bronze ===
- Archery
  - Women's individual compound – Maryanne Gul (defeated Myanmar 107–104)
- Aquatics
  - Men's 50 m freestyle – Kwok Ying Wah Leslie (heats: 23.88, finals: 23.58)
  - Men's 100 m freestyle – Tay Zhi Rong Bryan (heats: 53.12, finals: 52.38)
  - Men's 200 m backstroke – Cheah Mingzhe Marcus (heats: 2:11.05, finals: 2:08.50)
  - Men's 200 m butterfly – Tan Lee Yu Gary (heats: 2:06.37, finals: 2:04.82)
  - Men's 200 m freestyle – Tay Zhi Rong Bryan (heats: 2:02.14, finals: 1:54.39)
  - Men's 200 m individual medley – Tan Lee Yu Gary (heats: 1:18.27, finals: 2:08.01)
  - Men's 400 m individual medley – Lee Jiann Yow Lionel (heats: 4:41.11, finals: 4:32.58)
  - Women's 100 m butterfly – Tao Li (heats: 1:04.15, finals: 1:01.53)
  - Women's 200 m butterfly – Bernardette Lee (heats: 2:20.02, finals: 2:18.81)
  - Women's 400 m freestyle – Quah Ting Wen (heats: 4:26.98, finals: 4:24.75)
  - Women's 400 m individual medley – Quah Ting Wen (heats: 5:04.09, finals: 5:01.57)
- Athletics
  - Men's 4 × 100 m freestyle relay – Erzalmaniq Fawy Rawi, Mohd Shameer Mohd Ayub, Poh Seng Song, UK Shyam (reserves: Muhd Firdaus Bin Juhari, Sim Chee Hao Alfred): 40.59s, awarded third position after Indonesia was disqualified
  - Men's Shot put – Wong Tuck Yim James: 12.66m
  - Women's Discus – Zhang Guirong: 48.62m
  - Women's Javelin – Zhang Guirong: 48.70m
- Billiards and Snooker
  - Men's 8-Ball Pool Singles – Tey Choon Kiat
  - Men's 8-Ball Pool Doubles – Chan Keng Kwang and Tey Choon Kiat (defeated Brunei Darussalam 9–6)
  - Men's 9-Ball Pool Doubles – Chan Keng Kwang and Toh Lian Han (defeated Thailand 11–8)
  - Women's 8-Ball Pool Singles – Chai Zeet Huey Charlene (defeated Indonesia 9–6)
  - Women's 9-Ball Pool Singles – Hoe Shu Wah (defeated ?)
- Bodybuilding
  - 55 kg – Ng Han Cheng Vincent
- Bowling
  - Men's team of 5 – Goh Heng Soon Sam, Kwang Kok Leong, Lee Yu Wen, Remy Ong, Tan Siong Kooi Terence and Yeong Nathan Jason (6385)
  - Women's team of 5 – Chan Lu Ee Evelyn, Kwang Tien Mei, Tan Bee Leng, Tan Shi Hua Jazreel, Tay Hong Keow and Teng Pei Ling Rena (6186)
- Chess
  - Men's Rapid Chess – Goh Koon Jong Jason
  - Men's Rapid Chess Team – Goh Koon Jong Jason, Goh Wei Ming, Wong Meng Kong, Wu Shaobin: Round 1: Bye, Round 2: defeated Myanmar 2.5 to 1.5, Round 3: defeated Indonesia 3 to 1, Semi finals: lost to the Philippines 1.5 to 2.5
  - Men's Standard Chess – Goh Wei Ming
- Fencing
  - Men's Épée Team – Ang Chez Yee, Fang Kuo Wei Nicholas, Leong Kok Seng and Lin Qinghui (lost to Thailand 36–44)
  - Women's Sabre – Lim Yean Hong Nona
- Golf
  - Men's singles – Choo Tze Huang
- Karatedo
  - Men's individual kumite (open weight) – Lee Chia Jun: defeated Thailand 6–3
  - Women's individual Kata – Ng Pei Yi
- Pencak Silat
  - Men's tanding class A – Mohd Asadullah (lost to Indonesia 0–5)
  - Men's tanding class D – Mohd Saifullah (drew with Malaysia 5–5)
  - Men's tanding class F – Mohd Iswandy (lost to Vietnam 0–5)
  - Women's artistic singles – Norishah binte Anuar
  - Women's tanding class A – Nur As'Ashikeen binte Amran (lost to Myanmar 1–4)
  - Women's tanding class B – Saiedah binte Said (lost to Vietnam 0–5)
  - Women's tanding class D – Zuhrah Sabri (lost to Vietnam 0–5)
- Petanque
  - Women's singles – Heo Boon Huay Vicki (lost to Thailand 10–13)
  - Women's pairs – Goh Heoi Bin and Heo Boon Huay Vicki (lost to Thailand 8–13)
- Rowing
  - Men's Lightweight Single Sculls – Roozaimy bin Omar
- Sailing
  - Men's 470 Men – Tay Jun Hao Roy and Chung Pei Ming
  - Men's Formula – Sailboard – Tan Wearn Haw
- Shooting
  - Men's 10m air rifle – Zhang Jin
  - Men's 50m Free Pistol – Poh Lip Meng
  - Men's practical semi-auto shotgun – Tan Guan Hua
  - Women's 10m air rifle – Zhang Jingna
  - Women's skeet – Ng Swee Theng (78)
- Table tennis
  - Men's singles – Yang Zi (lost to Indonesia 2–4)
  - Women's doubles – Yan Xu and Tan Paey Fern (lost to Indonesia 2–3)
- Triathlon
  - Women's 1.5 km Swim, 40 km Bike, 10 km Run – Ng Xinyi Alisa (2:21)
- Wushu
  - Duilian – Deng Yingzhi (9.13)
  - Taijiquan (taijijian) – Shen Pinxiu (18.36)

== Results by event ==
=== Archery ===
Men's individual recurve

- Loh Wen Liang (Long Distance Qualifiers: 592; Short Distance Qualifiers: 1243; Elimination Round 1/16: defeated Thailand 157–153; lost to Malaysia 154–162)
- Ong Chee Bin (Long Distance Qualifiers: 567; Short Distance Qualifiers: 1219; Elimination Round 1/16: defeated Indonesia 157–144; lost to Thailand 159–162)
- Soh Wee Peng (Long Distance Qualifiers: 528; Short Distance Qualifiers: 1156; Elimination Round 1/16: defeated the Philippines152–148)
- Woo Wei Leong (Long Distance Qualifiers: 569; Short Distance Qualifiers: 1202; Elimination Round 1/16: lost to Indonesia 152–153)

Men's individual compound

- Lee Siak Wan Ray (Long Distance Qualifiers: 642; Short Distance Qualifiers: 1316; Elimination Round 1/16: lost to Thailand 161–167)
- Heng Fook Hup Vinson (Long Distance Qualifiers: 649; Short Distance Qualifiers: 1320, seventh position; Elimination Round 1/16: lost to Thailand 158-1597)
- Kwong Kok Fong Eugene (Long Distance Qualifiers: 630; Short Distance Qualifiers: 1319; Elimination Round 1/16: defeated Malaysia 169–159; Elimination Round 1/8: lost to Myanmar 156–161)
- Ong Chong Soon Michael (Long Distance Qualifiers: 646, ninth position; Short Distance Qualifiers: 1322; Elimination Round 1/16: defeated Thailand 164–147; Elimination Round 1/8: lost to Myanmar 161–164)

Women's individual compound

- Lee Bee Teng Shirlene (Long Distance Qualifiers: 634; Short Distance Qualifiers: 1300; Elimination Round 1/16: defeated Vietnam 149–128; Elimination Round 1/8: lost to Singapore 153–171)
- Maryanne Gul (Long Distance Qualifiers: 660; Short Distance Qualifiers: 1328; Elimination Round 1/16: Bye; Elimination Round 1/8: defeated Singapore 171–153; Elimination Round 1/4: defeated the Philippines 105–100; Quarter-Finals: lost to the Philippines 99–114; Bronze Medal Match: defeated Myanmar 107–104. Finished third position)
- Leong Yoke Sim Janie (Long Distance Qualifiers: 627; Short Distance Qualifiers: 1283; Elimination Round 1/16: defeated Vietnam 158–151; Elimination Round 1/8: lost to Thailand 155–163)
- Tan Bee Wah Sharon (Long Distance Qualifiers: 590; Short Distance Qualifiers: 1711; Elimination Round 1/16: lost to Thailand 149–150)

Men's compound Team

- Lee Siak Wan, Heng Fook Hup, Kwong Kok Fong and Ong Chong Soon (Elimination: drew with Indonesia 233–233)

Men's recurve team

- Loh Wen Liang, Ong Chee Bin, Soh Wee Peng and Woo Wei Leong (Elimination: defeated Myanmar 222–230)

Women's compound Team

- Lee Bee Teng Shirlene, Leong Yoke Sim Janie, Maryanne Gul and Tan Bee Wah Sharon (Elimination: defeated Vietnam 234–214; Semi-finals: lost to Indonesia 219–222; Bronze Medal Match: lost to Myanmar 228–245, finished fourth position)

=== Aquatics ===
Men's swimming

- 50 m freestyle – Kwok Ying Wah Leslie (heats: 23.88, finals: 23.58. Finished third), Chay Jung Jun Mark (heats: 24.24, finals: 24.38. Finished sixth)
- 100 m freestyle – Chay Jung Jun Mark (heats: 53.20, finals: 52.61. Finished fourth), Tay Zhi Rong Bryan (heats: 53.12, finals: 52.38. Finished third)
- 200 m freestyle – Chay Jung Jun Mark (heats: 1:59.06, finals: 1:56.97. Finished sixth), Tay Zhi Rong Bryan (heats: 2:02.14, finals: 1:54.39. Finished third)
- 400 m freestyle – Cheah Mingzhe Marcus (heats: 4:13.64, finals: 4:02.56. Finished fourth), Lee Jiann Yow Lionel (heats: 4:10.67, finals: 4:00.51. Finished first)
- 1500 m freestyle – Cheah Mingzhe Marcus (heats: ?, finals: 16:35.14. Finished sixth), Lim Zhi Cong (heats: 16:36.21, finals: 16:35.21. Finished seventh)
- 100 m backstroke – Chay Jung Jun Mark (heats: 1:00.69, finals: 58.49. Finished second), Lim Zhi Cong (heats: 1:01.18, finals: 1:01.14. Finished ninth)
- 200 m backstroke – Cheah Mingzhe Marcus (heats: 2:11.05, finals: 2:08.50. Finished third), Tan Lee Yu Gary (heats: 2:10.15, finals: 2:07.26. Finished second)
- 100 m breaststroke – Lim Zhi Cong (heats: 1:07.94, did not advance), Tan Jinwen Mark (heats: 1:06.89, finals: 1:17.49)
- 200 m breaststroke – Lim Zhi Cong (heats: 2:29.03, finals: 2:30.08. Finished eighth), Tan Jinwen Mark (heats: 2:26.54, finals: 2:25.12. Finished seventh)
- 100 m butterfly – Ng Cheng Xun (heats: 57.14, finals: 56.63. Finished fifth), Tan Lee Yu Gary (heats: 57.38, did not advance)
- 200 m butterfly – Ng Cheng Xun (heats: 2:11.84, finals: ?), Tan Lee Yu Gary (heats: 2:06.37, finals: 2:04.82. Finished third)
- 200 m individual medley – Lee Jiann Yow Lionel, (heats: 2:11.24, finals: 2:09.56. Finished fifth), Tan Lee Yu Gary (heats: 1:18.27, finals: 2:08.01. Finished third)
- 400 m individual medley – Lee Jiann Yow Lionel (heats: 4:41.11, finals: 4:32.58. Finished third), Lim Zhi Cong (heats: 4:42.98, finals: 4:32.90. Finished fourth)
- 4 × 100 m freestyle relay
  - Chay Jung Jun Mark, Su Shirong Jeffrey, Tan Lee Yu Gary, Tay Zhi Rong Bryan (3:27.56, finished first)
- 4 × 200 m freestyle relay
  - Chay Jung Jun Mark, Cheah Mingzhe Marcus, Tan Lee Yu Gary, Tay Zhi Rong Bryan (7:35.85, finished first, new games record)
- 4 × 100 m medley relay
  - Chay Jung Jun Mark, Ng Cheng Xun, Tan Jinwen Mark, Tay Zhi Rong Bryan (3:52.70, finished fourth)

Women's swimming

- 50 m freestyle – Ho Shu Yong (heats: 27.06, finals: 26.61. Finished second), Joscelin Yeo (heats: 26.46, finals: 26.13. Finished first, new games record)
- 100 m freestyle – Ho Shu Yong (heats: 59.86, finals: 58.42s. Finished fourth), Joscelin Yeo (heats: 1:00.48, finals: 56.41s. Finished first)
- 200 m freestyle – Ho Shu Yong (heats: 2:21.70, did not advance), Mylene Ong (heats: 2:10.60, finals: 2:09.45. Finished sixth)
- 400 m freestyle – Goh Wan Ting (heats: 4:34.30, finals: 4:34.55.), Quah Ting Wen (heats: 4:26.98, finals: 4:24.75. Finished third)
- 800 m freestyle – Goh Wan Ting (finals: 9:25.75. Finished seventh), Quah Ting Wen (finals: 9:02.20. Finished second)
- 100 m backstroke – Bernardette Lee (heats: 1:08.50, finals: 1:07.93. Finished seventh), Tao Li (heats: 1:08.20, finals: 1:03.83. Finished first, new games record)
- 200 m backstroke – Bernardette Lee (heats: 2:25.19, finals: 2:23.21. Finished fourth), Tao Li (heats: 2:25.53, finals: 2:17.55. Finished first)
- 100 m breaststroke – Nicolette Teo (heats: 1:13.89, finals: 1:11.80. Finished second), Joscelin Yeo (heats: 1:13.69, finals: 1:11.74. Finished first)
- 200 m breaststroke – Mo Qiyu Sandy (heats: 2:46.19, finals: 2:43.48. Finished sixth), Nicolette Teo (heats: 2:38.17, finals: 2:34.56. Finished first)
- 100 m butterfly – Tao Li (heats: 1:04.15, finals: 1:01.53. Finished third), Joscelin Yeo (heats: 1:03.59, finals: 59.91. Finished first, new games record)
- 200 m butterfly – Bernardette Lee (heats: 2:20.02, finals: 2:18.81. Finished third), Tao Li (heats: 2:21.96, finals: 2:14.11. Finished first, new games record)
- 200 m individual medley – Nicolette Teo (2:22.86, finished second), Joscelin Yeo (2:19.23, finished first)
- 400 m individual medley – Bernardette Lee (heats: 5:05.32, finals: 5:00.27. Finished second), Quah Ting Wen (heats: 5:04.09, finals: 5:01.57. Finished third)
- 4 × 100 m freestyle relay
  - Ruth Ho, Ho Shu Yong, Lynette Ng, Joscelin Yeo (3:55.53, finished second)
- 4 × 200 m freestyle relay
  - Ho Shu Yong, Mylene Ong, Quah Ting Wen, Joscelin Yeo (8:34.75, finished second)
- 4 × 100 m medley relay
  - Ho Shu Yong, Tao Li, Nicolette Teo, Joscelin Yeo ( 4:14.49, finished first, new games record)

Men's water polo: 1st place

- Round-robin: defeated Malaysia, 21–3
- Round-robin: defeated Philippines, 7–6
- Round-robin: defeated Indonesia, 16–7
- Round-robin: defeated Thailand, 12–3
- Round-robin: defeated Vietnam, 15–4

=== Athletics ===
UK Shyam and Poh Seng Song qualification marked the first time in 12 years in which two Singaporean sprinters were featured in the 100 metres event.

Men

- 100 m – Poh Seng Song (heats 10.72, qualified; finals 10.58, fourth position), UK Shyam (heats: 10.74, qualified; finals: 10.83, seventh position)
- 200 m – Mohd Shameer bin Mohd Ayub (21.94s, sixth position)
- 400 m – Muhd Firdaus bin Juhari (49.78s, eighth position)
- 110 m Hurdles – Abdul Hakeem bin Abdul Halim (14.94, sixth position)
- Long jump – Kenneth Wang Kan (finals: 7.00m, seventh position)
- 4 × 100 m freestyle relay – Erzalmaniq Fawy Rawi, Mohd Shameer Mohd Ayub, Poh Seng Song, UK Shyam, reserves: Muhd Firdaus Bin Juhari, Sim Chee Hao Alfred (40.59s, fourth position, awarded third position after Indonesia was disqualified)
- Discus – Wong Tuck Yim James (55.11m, first position)
- Shot put – Wong Tuck Yim James (12.66m, third position)

Women

- Discus – Du Xianhui: 49.48m, first position, Zhang Guirong: 48.62m, third position
- Javelin – Zhang Guirong: 48.70m, third position
- Marathon – Tang Yoke Pin Vivian: 3:04.16, fifth position
- Shot put – Du Xianhui: 17.37m, second position, Zhang Guirong: 17.40m, first position

=== Badminton ===
Men's singles:

- Lee Yen Hui Kendrick (Preliminaries: lost to Vietnam 1–2)
- Tan Wei Kiat Aaron (Preliminaries: lost to Vietnam 1–2)

Women's singles:

- Li Li (Quarter-finals: defeated Indonesia 2–0)
- Xing Aiying (Quarter-finals: lost to Indonesia 0–2)

Men's doubles:

- Khoo Kian Teck and Fu Zhi Hui Alvin (Preliminaries: defeated the Philippines 2–1; Quarter-finals: lost to Indonesia 0–2)

Women's doubles:

- Liu Fan and Shinta (Preliminaries: lost to Vietnam 0–2)
- Jiang Yanmei and Li Yujia

Mixed doubles:

- Azlin and Vaness Neo (Preliminaries: lost to Vietnam 0–2)
- Hendri Saputra and Li Yujia (Quarter-finals: defeated ? 2–1)

Men's team

- Lee Yen Hui Kendrick won 15–1, 15–5
- Tan Wei Kiat Aaron lost 3–15, 7–15
- Chew Swee Hau lost 10–15, 1–15
- Khoo Kian Teck and Fu Zhi Hui Alvin lost 5–15, 15–9, 9–15
- Hendri Kurniawan Saputra and Lee Yen Hui Kendrick won 15–3, 15–13

(lost to Vietnam 2–3, did not advance)

Women's team:

- Li Li lost 7–11, 7–11
- Xing Ai Ying won 13–12, 11–2
- Jiang Yanmei won 10–13, 11–7, 11–5
- Liu Fan Frances and Shinta Mulia Sari lost 2–15, 10–15
- Jiang Yanmei and Li Yujia lost 15–12, 6–15, 2–15

(lost to Thailand 2–3, finished second position)

=== Billiards and Snooker ===
Men's 1 Cushion Carom Singles

- Freddie Soh (lost to Thailand 112–117, did not advance)

Men's 8-Ball Pool Singles

- Chan Keng Kwang (Preliminary rounds: lost to the Philippines 5–9, did not advance)
- Tey Choon Kiat (Preliminary rounds: defeated Indonesia 9–6; Semi-finals: finished third position)

Men's 8-Ball Pool Doubles

- Chan Keng Kwang and Tey Choon Kiat (Semi Finals: lost to Vietnam 3–9; Bronze medal match: defeated Brunei Darussalam 9–6, finished third position)

Men's 9-Ball Pool Singles

- Chan Keng Kwang (Semi Finals: defeated Vietnam 11–6; Finals: defeated ?, finished first position)
- Toh Lian Han

Men's 9-Ball Pool Doubles

- Chan Keng Kwang and Toh Lian Han (Preliminary rounds: defeated Malaysia 11–10; Semi-Finals: lost to the Philippines 9–11; Bronze medal match: defeated Thailand 11–8, finished third position)

Men's 15-Ball Pool Singles

- Chan Keng Kwang (Preliminary rounds: lost to the Philippines 1–5, did not advance)
- Tan Tiong Boon (Preliminary rounds: defeated Malaysia 5–1; Quarter finals: lost to Muhamad Junarto (Indonesia) 3–5)

Men's 15-Ball Pool Doubles

- Chan Keng Kwang and Tan Tiong Boon (*Qualifiers: lost to the Philippines 4–5, did not advance)
- English Billiards Singles – Puan Teik Chuan Alan and Yeo Teck Shin
- English Billiards Doubles – Soh Chye Hian Freddie and Yeo Teck Shin
- Snooker Singles – E Boon Aun Keith, Puan Yi Wei Alex

Men's snooker doubles

- E Boon Aun Keith and Puan Yi Wei Alex (Qualifiers: defeated Myanmar 3–1; Semi finals: defeated the Philippines 3–1; Finals: lost to Thailand 1–3)

Men's Snooker Team

- Quarter finals:
  - Chan Keng Kwang, E Boon Aun Keith and Puan Yi Wei Alex: defeated Malaysia 3–1
- Semi finals:
  - Chan Keng Kwang, E Boon Aun Keith and Puan Yi Wei Alex: lost to the Philippines 1–3
- Bronze medal match:
  - Chew Kok Hwa Ricky, E Boon Aun Keith and Puan Yi Wei Alex: lost to Indonesia 2–3, finished fourth position

Women's 8-Ball Pool Singles

- Chai Zeet Huey Charlene (Bronze medal match: defeated Indonesia 9–6, finished third position)
- Hoe Shu Wah (finished second position)

Women's 9-Ball Pool Singles

- Hoe Shu Wah (Bronze medal match: defeated ?, finished third position)
- Tan Bee Yen

=== Bodybuilding ===
- 55 kg – Ng Han Cheng Vincent (finished third position)
- 60 kg – Amir bin Zainal (did not compete)
- 65 kg – Ibrahim bin Sihat (finished first position)
- 70 kg – Abdul Halim bin Haron (lost)
- 75 kg – Chua Ling Fung Simon (finished first position)
- 80 kg – Mohd Ismail Mohd (lost)

=== Bowling ===
Men's singles

- Remy Ong (1st Block: 1261, 13th position, second position)
- Yeong Nathan Jason (1st Block: 1276, 10th position)
- Kwang Kok Leong (1st Block: 1132, 30th position)
- Tan Siong Kooi Terence (11th Block: 218, 21st position)
- Goh Heng Soon Sam (1st Block: 1307, 8th position)
- Lee Yu Wen (1st Block: 1268, 11th position)

Men's doubles

- Remy Ong and Yeong Nathan Jason (2646, sixth position)
- Kwang Kok Leong and Lee Yu Wen (2577, seventh position)
- Goh Heng Soon and Tan Siong Kooi Terence (2439, fifteenth position)

Men's trios

- Lee Yu Wen, Remy Ong and Yeong Nathan Jason (3907, fourth position)
- Kwang Kok Leong, Goh Heng Soon Sam and Tan Siong Kooi Terence (3715, seventh position)

Men's team of 5

- Goh Heng Soon Sam, Kwang Kok Leong, Lee Yu Wen, Remy Ong, Tan Siong Kooi Terence and Yeong Nathan Jason (6385, third position)

Women's singles

- Chan Lu Ee Evelyn (1st Block: 1203, 17th position; 2nd Block: 3216, sixteenth position)
- Tan Shi Hua Jazreel (1st Block: 1167, 11th position; 2nd Block: 3689, second position)
- Tan Bee Leng (1st Block: 1210, 16th position)
- Tay Hong Keow (1st Block: 1270, 9th position; 2nd Block: 3414, twelfth position)
- Kwang Tien Mei (1st Block: 1198, 19th position; 2nd Block: 3484, eighth position)
- Teng Pei Ling Rena (1st Block: 1124, 24th position)

Women's doubles

- Chan Lu Ee Evelyn and Kwang Tien Mei (2536, seventh position)
- Tan Shi Hua Jazreel and Teng Pei Ling Rena (2511, eighth position)
- Tan Bee Leng and Tay Hong Keow (2492, eleventh position)

Women's trios

- Kwang Tien Mei, Tan Bee Leng and Tay Hong Keow (3825, fourth position)
- Chan Lu Ee Evelyn, Tan Shi Hua Jazreel and Teng Pei Ling Rena (3683, sixth position)

Women's team of 5

- Chan Lu Ee Evelyn, Kwang Tien Mei, Tan Bee Leng, Tan Shi Hua Jazreel, Tay Hong Keow and Teng Pei Ling Rena (6186, third position)

=== Canoeing/Kayaking ===
- 500m (K1) – Lim Ling Min (Heats:second position; Semi-Finals:third position; Finals B: first position)
- 500m (K2) – Chen Jiewen Andrea and Yong Shiyun (Finals: fourth position)
- 500m (K4) – Teo Hui Lin, Chen Jiewen Andrea, Yong Shiyun and Lim Ling Min (Finals: fourth position)

=== Chess ===
Men's Blitz Chess

- Goh Koon Jong Jason (Qualifiers: 6, twelfth position)
- Goh Wei Ming (Qualifiers: 5.5, fifteenth position)
- Wong Meng Kong (Qualifiers: 3.5, twenty-sixth position)
- Wu Shaobin (Qualifiers: 6, eleventh position)

Men's Rapid Chess

- Goh Koon Jong Jason (Preliminary rounds: defeated Indonesia 2.5 to 1.5; Semi-finals: placed third)
- Wu Shaobin (Preliminary rounds: defeated Malaysia 1.5 to 0.5; Semi-finals: lost to Vietnam)

Men's Rapid Chess Team

- Goh Koon Jong Jason, Goh Wei Ming, Wong Meng Kong, Wu Shaobin (Round 1: Bye, Round 2: defeated Myanmar 2.5 to 1.5, Round 3: defeated Indonesia 3 to 1, Semi finals: lost to the Philippines 1.5 to 2.5, finished third)

Men's Standard Chess

- Goh Koon Jong Jason (Round 1: defeated Brunei Darussalam; Round 2: drew with Malaysia; Round 3: lost to the Philippines; Round 4: drew with Vietnam; Round 5: lost Vietnam; Round 6: drew with Indonesia)
- Goh Wei Ming (Round 1: drew with Vietnam; Round 2: defeated Vietnam; Round 3: defeated Indonesia; Round 4: lost to the Philippines; Round 5: drew with the Philippines; Round 6: defeated Malaysia, finished third position)
- Wong Meng Kong (Round 1: drew with Vietnam; Round 2: drew with Vietnam; Round 3: drew with ?; Round 4: drew with Indonesia; Round 5: drew with Indonesia; Round 6: drew with Malaysia)
- Wu Shaobin (Round 1: defeated Malaysia; Round 2: defeated Indonesia; Round 3: lost to the Philippines; Round 4: lost to Vietnam; Round 5: drew with Malaysia; Round 6: lost to Vietnam)

Women's Blitz Chess

- Hui Sau Mun Dawn (Qualifiers: 4, twenty first position)
- Liu Yang (Qualifiers: 5, eighteenth position)
- Tay Li jin Jeslin (Qualifiers: 5.5, fourteenth position)
- Sia Xin Yun Suzanna (Qualifiers: 3.5, twenty fourth position)

Women's Standard Chess

- Hui Sau Mun Dawn (Round 1: defeated Myanmar; Round 2: lost to Myanmar; Round 3: lost to the Philippines; Round 4: defeated Myanmar; Round 5: lost to Vietnam; Round 6: lost to Malaysia)
- Liu Yang (Round 1: defeated Myanmar; Round 2: lost to the Philippines; Round 3: drew with Indonesia; Round 4: drew with the Philippines; Round 5: drew with Indonesia; Round 6: lost to Malaysia)
- Sia Xin Yun Suzanna (Round 1: defeated Indonesia, Round 2: drew with Vietnam; Round 3: lost to Vietnam; Round 4: lost to Vietnam; Round 5: lost to the Philippines; Round 6: defeated Myanmar)
- Tay Li jin Jeslin (Round 1: lost to Vietnam; Round 2: lost to Indonesia; Round 3: lost to Vietnam; Round 4: lost to Myanmar; Round 5: drew with Malaysia; Round 6: drew with Myanmar)

=== Cycling ===
Cross Country (Men)

- Yang Wei Sheng Samuel (eighth position)
- Junaidi bin Hashim (fifth position)

Downhill (Men / Women)

- Mohd Herman bin Mohd Arsek (fifth position)

40 km Individual

- Firdaus bin Hamzah

160 km Masses Start (Team)

- Seah Teck Wee, Firdaus bin Hamzah, Teo Woon Lip and Cheah Hwee Ping Eddie

Criterium Race

- Seah Teck Wee (fourth position)

=== Dancesport ===
Latin American Dances

- Preliminary rounds:
- Roger Kwa and Tan Huey Kuan Connie: Failed to qualify
- Finals:
- Tan Joon Ping Melvin and Tan Huey Boon Sharon: finished fourth

Standard

- Finals:
- Toh Kian Heng Kelvin, Chong Min Min Rosanne: finished sixth

=== Equestrian ===
Showjumping

- Alla Poloumieva (1st Qualifier: third position)
- Nadia Chen (1st Qualifier: first position)
- Catherine Chew (1st Qualifier: fifth position)

Showjumping Team

- Alla Poloumieva, Nadia Chen, Catherine Chew and Monique Heah (1st round: 62 Faults, fourth position; Finals: fourth position)

=== Fencing ===
Men's Épée

- Fang Kuo Wei Nicholas
- Lin Qinghui

Men's Épée Team

- Ang Chez Yee, Fang Kuo Wei Nicholas, Leong Kok Seng and Lin Qinghui (Elimination: defeated Indonesia 45–33, Finals: lost to Thailand 36–44, finished third)

Men's Foil

- Sng Chong Guo Eddie (Preliminaries: fifth position)
- Tsang Chi Yin Anthony (Preliminaries: eleventh position)

Men's Foil Team

- Chua Wee Hong Eugene, Sng Chong Guo Eddie, Tan Yiheng Benjamin and Tsang Chi Yin Anthony

Men's Sabre

- Derrick Liao (Preliminaries: eighth position)
- Mark Dhinesh Muthiah (Preliminaries: eleventh position)

Men's Sabre Team

- Chan Wei Ren David, Foo Chuan Ai Jay Joel, Liao Siyuan Derrick and Mark Dhinesh Muthiah (Elimination: lost to Indonesia 40–45, did not advance)

Women's Épée

- Teng Nan See (finished tenth position)
- Villacellino Aurora Yingchun (finished eighth position)

Women's Épée Team

- Huang Xinen Magdelene, Ngo Ruo Shi Ruth, Teng Nan See and Villacellino Aurora Yingchun (Elimination: lost to Indonesia 33–45, did not advance)

Women's Foil

- Ng Yi Lin Ruth (Preliminaries: eight position)
- Ser Xue Ling Serene (Preliminaries: fifth position)

Women's Foil Team

- Ng Yi Lin Ruth, Ser Xue Ling Serene, Tay Yu Ling and Wong Ye Han Cheryl (Elimination: defeated Indonesia 45–34, Finals: defeated Vietnam 44–39, finished first)

Women's Sabre

- Lim Yean Hong Nona (finished third position)

=== Football ===
Men's:

- Elimination round: lost to Vietnam, 1–2
- Elimination round: tied with Indonesia, 0–0
- Elimination round: defeated Laos, 1–0
- Elimination round: defeated Myanmar, 1–0

Finished at third position in Group B and failed to advance to next stage.

=== Golf ===
Men's singles

- Choo Tze Huang (Round 1: 67, joint first position; Round 3: second position, finished third position)
- Goh Kun Yang (Round 1: Unranked)
- Leong Kit Wai (Round 1: 70, joint fifth position)
- Quek Peng Xiang (Round 1: 73, twelfth position)

Men's team

- Choo Tze Huang, Goh Kun Yang, Leong Kit Wai and Quek Peng Xiang (Round 2: joint first position; Round 3: second position; finished second position)

Women's singles

- Goh Simin Christabel (Round 1: twelfth position, Round 2: 82, thirteenth position, Finals: twelfth position)
- Heng Su-Ann (Round 1: eleventh position, Round 2: 72, tenth position, Finals: tenth position)
- Koh Sock Hwee (Round 1: ninth position, Round 2: 76, eleventh position, Finals: eleventh position)

Women's team

- Goh Simin Christabel, Heng Su-Ann and Koh Sock Hwee (finished fourth position)

=== Gymnastics ===
Men's:

- Artistic Individual All Round
  - Ho Wah Toon

Women's:

- Artistic team: Lee Wen Ling, Lee Wen Si, Lim Heem Wei, Nur Atikah Nabilah Binte Muhammad Jufrie, Tay Jia Hui Tabitha, Tay Xi Hui Nicole: first position
- Artistic Individual All Round
  - Tay Jia Hui Tabitha (32.299, fourth position)
  - Tay Xi Hui Nicole (31.750, sixth position)
- Artistic Individual Balanced Beam
  - Tay Jia Hui Tabitha (7.96, second position)
  - Tay Xi Hui Nicole (6.825, sixth position)
- Artistic Individual Floor Exercise
  - Tay Xi Hui Nicole (first position)
  - Lee Wen Ling (fourth position)
- Artistic Individual Uneven bars
  - Tay Xi Hui Nicole (7.937, second position)
  - Lee Wen Si (7.575, sixth position)
- Artistic Individual Vault
  - Tay Xi Hui Nicole (8.468, sixth position)
  - Nur Atikah Nabilah Binte Muhammad Jufrie (8.4, eighth position)

=== Judo ===
Men's:

- 55 kg – Ng Jin Wen (Elimination: lost to Thailand)
- 60 kg – Ong Wei Lon (Elimination: lost to Myanmar)
- 66 kg – Eugene Tan Chern-Chue (Elimination: defeated Laos, lost to Indonesia)
- 73 kg – Yin Shanyang (Elimination: lost to Indonesia; 1st Repecharge: defeated Cambodia; 2nd Repecharge: lost to Vietnam, finished fifth position)
- 90 kg – Wee Pui Seng (Elimination: defeated Thailand 1–0; 1st Repecharge: lost to Indonesia; 2nd Repecharge: lost to Malaysia, finished fifth position)

=== Karatedo ===
Men's:

- Individual Kata – Teo Heng Bin (finished fifth)
- Individual Kumite (55 kg) – Jeremy Aruldoss Bronze match (withdraw due to rib injury)1st rd- Win 6–5 to Myanmar, Quarter-final Win 12–5 to Cambodia, Semis Lost to Malaysia (Asian Games Gold) 1–9
- Individual Kumite (75 kg) – Lee Chia Jun (Disqualified) Technical Fault
- Individual Kumite (open weight) – Lee Chia Jun (defeated Thailand 6–3, placed third)

Women's:

- Individual Kata – Ng Pei Yi: finished third

=== Lawn Bowls ===
Men's pairs

- Lee Eng Huat and Tan Kah Hock (Round 1: lost to Thailand 19–20; Round 2: ?; Round 3: defeated Brunei Darussalam 18–16; Round 4: lost to the Philippines 15–21)

Men's triples

- Foo Meng Yin, Ho Kia Nan and Soo Cheong Kwai (Round 1: lost to Thailand 3–7?; Round 3: lost to Brunei Darussalam 11–17; Round 4: lost to the Philippines 11–17)

Women's singles

- Tan Bee Yian (Round 1: lost to Thailand 7–21; Round 2: ?; Round 3: lost to the Philippines 12–21; Round 4: lost to the Philippines 12–21, Finals: lost to Malaysia 10–21)

=== Pencak Silat ===
Men's:

- Tanding Class A – Mohd Asadullah (Semi Finals: lost to Indonesia 0–5, finished third position)
- Tanding Class B – Muhamed Nor Sarhan bin Hamzah (Preliminaries: lost to Thailand 0–5, did not advance)
- Tanding Class C – Mohd Zulfakar (Disqualified for foul kick, did not advance)
- Tanding Class D – Mohd Saifullah (Preliminaries: defeated the Philippines 4–1, Semi-Finals: drew with Malaysia 5–5, finished third position)
- Tanding Class E – Mohd Saifuddin (Preliminaries: lost to Malaysia 0–5, did not advance)
- Tanding Class F – Mohd Iswandy (Preliminaries: defeated Malaysia 3–2, Round 2: lost to Vietnam 0–5, finished third position)
- Tanding Class G – Abdul Kadir (Preliminaries: defeated Myanmar 4–1; defeated Thailand 4–1; Finals: finished second position)
- Tanding Class H – Mohd Imran (Preliminaries: defeated the Philippines 5–0; Semi-Finals: defeated Vietnam 5–0; Finals: defeated Indonesia 5–0, finished first position)
- Tanding Class I – Mohd Yusoff (Preliminaries: defeated Indonesia 5–0; Finals: lost to Vietnam 1–4, finished second position)
- Tunggal Single Artistic – Dzulkarnian Abdul Raziz (Fourth position)

Women's:

- Artistic Singles – Norishah binte Anuar (Third position)
- Regu – Fatmah Abdul Halid, Raden Mas and Nor Dianawati (Second position)
- Tanding Class A – Nur As'Ashikeen binte Amran (Preliminaries: defeated Thailand 5–0; Round 2: lost to Myanmar 1–4, finished third position)
- Tanding Class B – Nur Dinniyati binte Mohamad Julami (Preliminaries: lost to Vietnam 0–5, did not advance), Saiedah binte Said (Preliminaries: lost to Vietnam 0–5, finished third position)
- Tanding Class C – Nor Dinniyati (Disqualified)
- Tanding Class D – Zuhrah Sabri (Preliminaries: lost to Vietnam 0–5, finished third position)
- Tunggal – Norishah bte Anwar (Preliminaries):

=== Petanque ===
Women's singles

- Goh Heoi Bin
- Heo Boon Huay Vicki (lost to Thailand 10–13, finished third)

Women's pairs

- Goh Heoi Bin and Heo Boon Huay Vicki (Semin-finals: lost to Thailand 8–13, finished third)

=== Rowing ===
Men's single sculls

- Heats Group A
  - Elsie Lim (third position)
- Repecharge
  - Elsie Lim:
- Finals
  - Elsie Lim (second Position)

Men's Lightweight Single Sculls

- Heats Group A
  - Roozaimy bin Omar (Proceed to Repecharge)
- Repecharge
  - Roozaimy bin Omar (Proceed to finals)
- Finals
  - Roozaimy bin Omar (third Position)

Men's lightweight double sculls

- Heats Group B
  - Lee Yee Fan Ivan and Kumaresan s/o Jayakrishnan (second position)
- Repecharge
  - Lee Yee Fan Ivan and Kumaresan s/o Jayakrishnan (Proceed to finals)
- Finals
  - Lee Yee Fan Ivan and Kumaresan s/o Jayakrishnan (7:48.79, sixth position)

Women's pairs

- Lane Race
  - Saiyidah Aisyah bte Mohamed Rafaee and Ong Shu Ying (third position)
- Finals
  - Saiyidah Aisyah bte Mohamed Rafaee and Ong Shu Ying:

=== Sailing ===
Men's:

- 420 Open – Xu Yuan Zhen and Wong Ming Ho Justin (Race 1: 1st, Race 2: 1st, Race 3: 1st, finished first position)
- 420 Boys – Teo Wee Chin and Terence Koh (Race 1: 1st, Race 2: 2nd, Race 3: 2nd, finished first position)
- 470 Men – Tay Jun Hao Roy and Chung Pei Ming (Race 1: 1st, Race 2: 4th, Race 3: 3rd, finished third position)
- Laser – Soh Khyan Tat Maximillian (finished first position)
- Laser Radial – Lo Man Yi (finished first position)
- Hobie 16 – Huang Jinjie Melcom and Chung Pei Quan (Race 1: 1st, Race 2: 2nd, Race 3: 1st, finished second position)
- RSX – Sailboard – Goh Thye Hock (finished fourth position)
- Formula – Sailboard – Tan Wearn Haw (finished third position)
- Optimist Boys – Lee Teik Ren Sean (finished second position)

Women's:

- 420 Girls – Tam Shiu Wun Siobhan and Liu Xiaodan Dawn (Race 1: 1st, Race 2: 1st, Race 3: 1st, finished first position)
- 470 Women – Toh Liying and Tok Lee Ching (Race 1: 1st, Race 2: 1st, Race 3: 1st, finished first position)
- Optimist Girls – Griselda Khng (finished first position)

=== Sepak Takraw ===
Men's:

- Regu – (Elimination: lost to Vietnam 0–2)
- Doubles – (Elimination: lost to the Philippines 1–2, lost to Thailand 0–2)

=== Shooting ===
Men's 10m air rifle

- Ong Jun Hong
- Zhang Jin (finished third position)

Men's 50m Free Pistol

- Poh Lip Meng (finished third position)

Men's 50m Free Rifle Prone

- Ong Jun Hong (Preliminaries: ninth position)

Men's practical pump shotgun

- Lawrence Wee (finished second position)

Men's practical semi-auto shotgun

- Tan Guan Hua (finished third position)

Men's skeet

- Cheang Eng Cheng Joseph
- Lee Yi
- Ng Chee Keong

Men's trap

- Choo Choon Seng (Preliminaries: 69 shots, second position, finished first position)
- Kwa Eng Cheong Michael (Preliminaries: 63 shots, did not advance)
- Lee Wung Yew (Preliminaries: 72 shots, first position, finished second position)

Men's trap Team

- Choo Choon Seng, Kwa Eng Cheong Michael, Lee Wung Yew (first position)

Men's Double Trap

- Lee Wung Yew (143, finished sixth position)
- Mohd Zain Amat (173, finished first position)

Men's practical pistol

- Chow Wei An (finished second position)
- Sivakumar Velayudhan (finished seventh position)

Women's 10m air pistol

- Zhao Hui Jing (finished fourth)

Women's 10m air rifle

- Vanessa Yong (finished second position)
- Zhang Jingna (finished third position)

Women's 50m Free Rifle 3-Position

- Lim Chea Rong
- Zhang Jingna

Women's 50m Free Rifle Prone

- Lim Chea Rong (Preliminaries: 9576, ninth position)

Women's skeet

- Ng Lee Ling (finished fourth)
- Ng Swee Theng (78, finished third position)

Women's trap

- Goh Chung Wei (finished fourth position)

=== Softball ===
Women's team

- First round: defeated Thailand 5–0
- First round: lost to the Philippines 0–3
- Second round: defeated Indonesia 8–7
- Semi finals: lost to the Philippines 1–2
- Finals: defeated Thailand 0–10

=== Table tennis ===
Men's singles

- Cai Xiaoli (Stage 1: defeated Cambodia 3–0; Stage 1: lost to the Philippines 2–3; Stage 1: defeated Malaysia 3–1)
- Yang Zi (Stage 1: defeated Myanmar 3–0; Stage 1: defeated Thailand 3–1; Stage 1: defeated Malaysia 3–0; Semi Finals: lost to Indonesia 2–4, finished third position)

Men's doubles

- Cai Xiaoli and Yang Zi (Stage 1: defeated the Philippines 3–0; Semi-finals: defeated Indonesia 3–1; Finals: defeated Indonesia 3–0, finished first position)
- Jason Ho and Lee Tien Hoe Clarence (Stage 1: lost to Indonesia 0–3, did not advance)

Men's team

- Cai Xiaoli, Lee Tien Hoe Clarence, Henry Seah, Jason Ho, Yang Zi
  - Stage 1: defeated Myanmar 3–0
  - Stage 1: lost to Vietnam 0–3
  - Stage 1: defeated Indonesia 3–1
  - Finals: defeated Vietnam 3–2, finished first position

Women's singles

- Li Jiawei (Stage 1: Bye; Stage 1: defeated Vietnam 3–0; Semi finals: defeated Thailand 4–3; Finals: lost to Singapore, finished second position)
- Zhang Xueling (Stage 1: defeated IMyanmar 3–2; Stage 1: defeated Vietnam 3–0; Semi finals: defeated Indonesia 4–0; Finals: defeated Singapore, finished first position)

Women's doubles

- Li Jiawei and Zhang Xueling (Stage 1: defeated Indonesia 3–1; Semi-finals: defeated Thailand 3–0; Finals: defeated Indonesia 3–0, finished first position)
- Yan Xu and Tan Paey Fern (Stage 1: defeated the Philippines 3–0; Semi-finals: lost to Indonesia 2–3, finished third position)

Women's team

- Jenn Lim, Li Jiawei, Tan Paey Fern, Yan Xu, Zhang Xueling
  - Stage 1: defeated Vietnam 3–0
  - Stage 1: defeated Indonesia 3–1
  - Stage 1: defeated Myanmar 3–0
  - Finals: defeated Thailand 3–1, finished first position

Mixed doubles

- Cai Xiaoli and Li Jiawei (Stage 1: defeated Vietnam 3–1; Semi-finals: defeated Malaysia 3–2; Finals: lost to Singapore 1–3, finished second position)
- Yang Zi and Zhang Xueling (Stage 1: defeated Indonesia 3–0; Semi-finals: defeated Thailand 3–0; Finals: defeated Singapore 3–1, finished first position)

=== Taekwondo ===
Men's

- Featherweight (62 to 67 kg) – Khor Huat Peng (Elimination: lost to Malaysia 1–4
- Middleweight (78 to 84 kg) – Poh Tze Chap (Quarter finals: lost to Vietnam 1–5

Women's

- Featherweight (55 to 59 kg) – Lim Soon Yi Joyce (Elimination: lost to Laos 1–5
- Welterweight (63 to 67 kg) – Ang Kai Ying Dawn (Elimination: lost to Indonesia 2–3

=== Traditional Boat Race ===
Men's

- 500m (10 a side) team – (Heats: 2:09.96, fifth position; Repechage: third position, did not advance)
- 1000m (10 a side) team – (Heats: 4:43.68; Repechage: 4:28.25; Finals: 4:36.33, finished fourth position)

Women's

- 500m (10 a side) team – (Heats: 2:24.86, fourth position; Repechage: third position, did not advance)
- 1000m (10 a side) team – (Heats: 5:08.56; Repechage: 5:03.11; Finals: 4:56.52, finished fourth position)

=== Triathlon ===
Men's

- 1.5 km Swim, 40 km Bike, 10 km Run – Cheng Jing Hean (1:58:41.14, first position), Ng Ernest Gino (2:05:00.00, fourth position)

Women's

- 1.5 km Swim, 40 km Bike, 10 km Run – Chan Meixian Elaine, Ng Xinyi Alisa (2:21, third position)

=== Volleyball ===
Women's:

- Elimination round: lost to the Philippines, 0–3
- Elimination round: lost to Indonesia, 0–3
- Elimination round: lost to Thailand, 0–3

=== Wushu ===
- Changquan – Khor Poh Chin (Finals: 9.10, sixth position), Seet Wee Key (Finals: 9.15, seventh position), Siow Kin Yan (Finals: 9.05, eleventh position)
- Duilian – Deng Yingzhi (Finals: 9.13, third position), Ng Xin Ni
- Gunshu – Ng Xin Ni (Elimination: 9.05, fifth position)
- Jianshu – Khor Poh Chin (Finals: 9.18, fifth position), Seet Wey Key (Elimination: 9.10, fourth position), Siow Kin Yan (Elimination: 9.00, ninth position)
- Nanquan – Deng Yingzhi (Elimination: 9.13, fourth position)
- Qiangshu – Khor Poh Chin (Finals: 9.2, second position), Seet Wee Key, Siow Kin Yan
- Taijiquan (taijijian) – Goh Qiu Bin (Elimination: 9.18, first position; finals: 18.56, first position), Shen Pinxiu (Finals: 18.36, third position), Yang Yong Kai (Elimination: 9.16, sixth position)
