= Malaysia at the 2005 SEA Games =

Malaysia at the 2005 Southeast Asian Games
- IOC code: MAS
- NOC: Olympic Council of Malaysia
- Website: www.olympic.org.my (in English)

in the Manila
- Competitors: 415 in 35 sports
- Flag bearers: Ho Ro Bin; S. Ravichandran; Nabihah Ali
- Officials: 301
- Medals Ranked 4th: Gold 61 Silver 49 Bronze 65 Total 175

Southeast Asian Games appearances (overview)
- 1959; 1961; 1965; 1967; 1969; 1971; 1973; 1975; 1977; 1979; 1981; 1983; 1985; 1987; 1989; 1991; 1993; 1995; 1997; 1999; 2001; 2003; 2005; 2007; 2009; 2011; 2013; 2015; 2017; 2019; 2021; 2023; 2025; 2027; 2029

Malaysia competed in the 2005 Southeast Asian Games held in multiple venues in the Philippines from 27 November to 5 December 2005. The Chief of mission to the games was Low Beng Choo. At the opening ceremony, The three flagbearers, Ho Ro Bin, S. Ravichandran, Nabihah Ali represents the country's three major ethnic groups, Malay, Chinese, and Indian.

== Medal summary ==
=== Medals by sport ===
Sport	Gold	Silver	Bronze	Total	Rank
Archery	3	2	1	6	2
Athletics	8	3	3	14	3
Badminton	2	1	6	9	2
Billiards and snooker	0	1	4	5	6
Bodybuilding	0	1	0	1	6
Bowling	3	3	3	9	2
Boxing	0	0	3	3	6
Cycling	4	2	1	7	1
Diving	5	4	2	11	1
Equestrian	1	1	0	2	2
Football	0	0	1	1	4
Gymnastics	10	8	4	22	1
Judo	0	0	3	3	
Karate	4	7	4	15	3
Lawn bowls	3	2	1	6	1
Pencak silat	3	2	3	8	2
Pétanque	0	1	1	2	4
Sailing	1	3	0	4	3
Sepaktakraw	1	0	0	1	3
Shooting	3	3	2	8	4
Softball	0	0	1	1	3
Squash	2	1	1	4	1
Swimming	4	3	1	8	4
Table tennis	0	0	1	1	6
Taekwondo	2	0	6	8	4
Triathlon	1	1	0	2	1
Water polo	0	0	1	1	3
Weightlifting	1	0	2	3	4
Wushu	0	2	3	5	7
Total	61	49	65	175	4

=== Medallists ===
Medal	Name	Sport	Event	Date
Gold	Anbarasi Subramaniam; Fairuz Hanisah Che Ibrahim; Mon Redee Sut Tzi; Siti Sholeha Yusof	Archery	Women's team recurve	5 Dec
Gold	Lang Hon Keong	Archery	Men's individual compound	4 Dec
Gold	Lang Hon Keong; Ng Poh Khoon; Soo Teck Tim; Ting Leong Fong	Archery	Men's team compound	5 Dec
Gold	Mohd Robani Hassan	Athletics	Men's 110 metres hurdles	29 Nov
Gold	Shahadan Jamaludin	Athletics	Men's 400 metres hurdles	30 Nov
Gold	Mohd Sharrulhaizy Abdul Rahman	Athletics	Men's 20 kilometres walk	1 Dec
Gold	Moh Siew Wei	Athletics	Women's 100 metres hurdles	29 Nov
Gold	Yuan Yufang	Athletics	Women's 20 kilometres walk	30 Nov
Gold	Ngew Sin Mei	Athletics	Women's triple jump	30 Nov
Gold	Roslinda Samsu	Athletics	Women's pole vault	28 Nov
Gold	Siti Shahida Abdullah	Athletics	Women's hammer throw	1 Dec
Gold	Chin Eei Hui; Wong Pei Tty	Badminton	Women's doubles	4 Dec
Gold	Malaysia national badminton team: Chan Chong Ming; Choong Tan Fook; Koo Kien Keat; Kuan Beng Hong; Lee Wan Wah; Lee Chong Wei; Muhammad Hafiz Hashim; Wong Choong Hann	Badminton	Men's team	30 Nov
Gold	Aaron Kong Eng Chuan; Daniel Lim Tow Chuang; Zulmazran Zulkifli	Bowling	Men's trios	2 Dec
Gold	Aaron Kong Eng Chuan; Alex Liew Kien Liang; Ben Heng Boon Hian; Daniel Lim Tow Chuang; Zulmazran Zulkifli	Bowling	Men's team of five	3 Dec
Gold	Crystal Choy Poh Lai; Esther Cheah Mei Lan; Lai Kin Ngoh; Wendy Chai De Choo; Zandra Aziela Ibrahim	Bowling	Women's team of five	3 Dec
Gold	Mohd Sayuti Mohd Zahit; Mohd Jasmin Ruslan; Thum Weng Kin; Muhammad Fauzan Ahmad Lutfi	Cycling	Men's team pursuit	4 Dec
Gold	Junaidi Mohamad Nasir; Mohd Rizal Tisin; Mohd Faizal Mohd Noh	Cycling	Men's team sprint	4 Dec
Gold	Suhardi Hassan	Cycling	Men's massed start race	3 Dec
Gold	Noor Azian Alias	Cycling	Women's massed start race	3 Dec
Gold	Yeoh Ken Nee	Diving	Men's 1 metre springboard	28 Nov
Gold	Yeoh Ken Nee	Diving	Men's 3 metre springboard	30 Nov
Gold	Bryan Nickson Lomas	Diving	Men's 10 metre platform	1 Dec
Gold	Leong Mun Yee	Diving	Women's 10 metre platform	30 Nov
Gold	Cheong Jun Hoong; Leong Mun Yee	Diving	Women's synchronised 10 metre platform	28 Nov
Gold	Qabil Ambak Mahamad Fathil	Equestrian	Men's individual show jumping	5 Dec
Gold	Ng Shu Wai	Gymnastics	Men's artistic individual all-around	1 Dec
Gold	Ng Shu Wai	Gymnastics	Men's floor	2 Dec
Gold	Ng Shu Wai	Gymnastics	Men's horizontal bar	2 Dec
Gold	Lum Wan Foong; Mohd Azzam Azmi; Ng Shu Mun; Ng Shu Wai; Ooi Wei Siang; Yap Kiam Bun	Gymnastics	Men's artistic team all-around	30 Nov
Gold	Nurul Fatiha Abdul Hamid	Gymnastics	Women's uneven bars	2 Dec
Gold	Chrystal Lim Wen Chean; Durratun Nasihin Rosli; Foong Seow Ting; See Hui Yee	Gymnastics	Women's rhythmic team all-around	3 Dec
Gold	Foong Seow Ting	Gymnastics	Women's rhythmic individual all-around	4 Dec
Gold	See Hui Yee	Gymnastics	Women's rhythmic rope	5 Dec
Gold	Foong Seow Ting	Gymnastics	Women's rhythmic ribbon	5 Dec
Gold	Foong Seow Ting	Gymnastics	Women's rhythmic clubs	5 Dec
Gold	Ku Jin Keat	Karate	Men's individual kata	28 Nov
Gold	Puvaneswaran Ramasamy	Karate	Men's individual kumite -55 kg	30 Nov
Gold	Kunasilan Lakanathan	Karate	Men's individual kumite -60 kg	30 Nov
Gold	Lim Lee Lee	Karate	Women's individual kata	28 Nov
Gold	Fairul Izwan Abdul Muin; Safuan Said	Lawn bowls	Men's pairs	5 Dec
Gold	Bah Chui Mei; Nor Hashimah Ismail	Lawn bowls	Women's pairs	5 Dec
Gold	Azlina Arshad; Haslah Hassan; Nor Iryani Azmi	Lawn bowls	Women's triples	5 Dec
Gold	Abang Erdie Fauzerul Abang Fauzan	Pencak silat	Men's 45−50 kg	5 Dec
Gold	Ahmad Shahril Zailudin	Pencak silat	Men's 60−65 kg	5 Dec
Gold	Suzy Mohd Sulaiman	Pencak silat	Women's artistic singles	2 Dec
Gold	Alvin Yeow Jian Shing	Sailing	Men's optimist	
Gold	Mohamad Normanizan Ahmad; Mohd Putra Abdul Ghani; Mohd Zulkarnain Arif	Sepaktakraw	Men's regu	3 Dec
Gold	Hasli Izwan Amir Hasan	Shooting	Men's 25 metre rapid fire pistol	3 Dec
Gold	Bibiana Ng Pei Chin	Shooting	Women's 25 metre pistol	30 Nov
Gold	Nur Suryani Taibi	Shooting	Women's 50 metre rifle prone	3 Dec
Gold	Mohd Nafiizwan Adnan	Squash	Men's singles	2 Dec
Gold	Sharon Wee	Squash	Women's singles	2 Dec
Gold	Daniel Bego	Swimming	Men's 200 metre freestyle	4 Dec
Gold	Alex Lim Keng Liat	Swimming	Men's 100 metre backstroke	2 Dec
Gold	Alex Lim Keng Liat	Swimming	Men's 200 metre backstroke	30 Nov
Gold	Daniel Bego	Swimming	Men's 100 metre butterfly	2 Dec
Gold	Rusfredy Tokan Petrus	Taekwondo	Men's flyweight (54−58 kg)	30 Nov
Gold	Che Chew Chan	Taekwondo	Women's middleweight (67−72 kg)	1 Dec
Gold	Kimberley Yap	Triathlon	Women's individual	2 Dec
Gold	Che Mohd Azrul Che Mat	Weightlifting	Men's +105 kg	5 Dec
Silver	Wan Khalmizam	Archery	Men's individual recurve	4 Dec
Silver	Ting Leong Fong	Archery	Men's individual compound	4 Dec
Silver	Mohd Faiz Mohamed	Athletics	Men's 110 metres hurdles	29 Nov
Silver	Thiru Kumaran Balay Sendram	Athletics	Men's 20 kilometres walk	1 Dec
Silver	Mohd Syahrul Amri Md Suhaimi	Athletics	Men's long jump	29 Nov
Silver	Wong Mew Choo	Badminton	Women's singles	4 Dec
Silver	Suhana Dewi Sabtu	Billiards and snooker	Women's nine-ball singles	5 Dec
Silver	Sazali Samad	Bodybuilding	Men's bantamweight (65 kg)	5 Dec
Silver	Alex Liew Kien Liang; Ben Heng Boon Hian	Bowling	Men's doubles	1 Dec
Silver	Zandra Aziela Ibrahim	Bowling	Women's singles	30 Nov
Silver	Wendy Chai De Choo; Zandra Aziela Ibrahim	Bowling	Women's doubles	1 Dec
Silver	Amiruddin Jamaluddin	Cycling	Men's individual pursuit	4 Dec
Silver	Anuar Manan	Cycling	Men's individual criterium	5 Dec
Silver	Rossharisham Roslan; Yeoh Ken Nee	Diving	Men's synchronised 3 metre springboard	29 Nov
Silver	Bryan Nickson Lomas; James Sandayud	Diving	Men's synchronised 10 metre platform	29 Nov
Silver	Leong Mun Yee	Diving	Women's 1 metre springboard	1 Dec
Silver	Leong Mun Yee	Diving	Women's 3 metre springboard	28 Nov
Silver	Emma Tan Hsieh Lea; Qabil Ambak Mahamad Fathil; Quzier Ambak Mahamad Fathil; Syed Omar Al-Mohdzar	Equestrian	Men's team show jumping	3 Dec
Silver	Ooi Wei Siang	Gymnastics	Men's artistic individual all-around	1 Dec
Silver	Ooi Wei Siang	Gymnastics	Men's horizontal bar	2 Dec
Silver	Ng Shu Wai	Gymnastics	Men's vault	2 Dec
Silver	Yap Kiam Bun	Gymnastics	Men's pommel horse	2 Dec
Silver	Nurul Fatiha Abdul Hamid	Gymnastics	Women's floor	2 Dec
Silver	Foong Seow Ting	Gymnastics	Women's rhythmic ball	5 Dec
Silver	Foong Seow Ting	Gymnastics	Women's rhythmic rope	5 Dec
Silver	Durratun Nasihin Rosli	Gymnastics	Women's rhythmic clubs	5 Dec
Silver	Rayner Kinsiong	Karate	Men's individual kumite -75 kg	29 Nov
Silver	Jarvis Julian	Karate	Men's individual kumite +75 kg	29 Nov
Silver	Danny Fredoline; Jarvis Julian; Kelvin Henry; Lim Yoke Wai; Mahendran Supremaniam; Puvaneswaran Ramasamy; Rayner Kinsiong	Karate	Men's team kumite	28 Nov
Silver	Jamalliah Jamaluddin	Karate	Women's individual kumite +60 kg	29 Nov
Silver	Yamini Gopalasamy	Karate	Women's individual kumite open weight	30 Nov
Silver	Thoe Ai Poh; Lim Lee Lee; Chin Fang Yin	Karate	Women's team kata	29 Nov
Silver	Jamalliah Jamaluddin; Lee Phei Sze; Vasantha Marial Anthony; Vathana Gopalasamy; Yamini Gopalasamy	Karate	Women's team kumite	28 Nov
Silver	Syed Mohammad Syed Akil	Lawn bowls	Men's singles	4 Dec
Silver	Khairul Anuar Abid Kadir; Megat Mohammad Nazim Zainuddin; Mohammad Azwan Shuhaimi	Lawn bowls	Men's triples	4 Dec
Silver	Norhasmizan Abdullah	Pencak silat	Men's 65−70 kg	5 Dec
Silver	Emy Latip	Pencak silat	Women's 60−65 kg	5 Dec
Silver	Mohd. Firdaus Adli Bakri	Pétanque	Men's singles	
Silver	Mohamed Romzi Mahamad	Sailing	Men's laser	
Silver	Tiffany Koo Yee Chin	Sailing	Open laser radial	
Silver	Rufina Tan Hong Mui	Sailing	Women's optimist	
Silver	Mohamed Hameleay Abdul Mutalib	Shooting	Men's 50 metre rifle prone	4 Dec
Silver	Cheong Yew Kwan	Shooting	Men's individual skeet	3 Dec
Silver	Amran Risman; Cheong Yew Kwan; Teh Chee Fei	Shooting	Men's team skeet	
Silver	Tricia Chuah	Squash	Women's singles	2 Dec
Silver	Daniel Bego	Swimming	Men's 100 metre freestyle	1 Dec
Silver	Ong Ming Xiu	Swimming	Women's 400 metre freestyle	
Silver	Chui Lai Kwan	Swimming	Women's 100 metre backstroke	2 Dec
Silver	Loh Yeong Shang	Triathlon	Men's individual	3 Dec
Silver	Ho Ro Bin	Wushu	Men's nanquan	29 Nov
Silver	Ang Eng Chong	Wushu	Men's daoshu	
Bronze	Cheng Chu Sian; Mohd Kaharuddin Ashah; Muhamad Marbawi Sulaiman; Wan Khalmizam	Archery	Men's team recurve	5 Dec
Bronze	Mohd Zafril Mohd Zuslaini	Athletics	Men's 400 metres	30 Nov
Bronze	Amran Raj Krishnan; Jayakumar Dewarajoo; Mohd Zafril Mohd Zuslaini; Shahadan Jamaludin	Athletics	Men's 4 × 400 m relay	1 Dec
Bronze	Ngew Sin Mei	Athletics	Women's long jump	28 Nov
Bronze	Lee Chong Wei	Badminton	Men's singles	4 Dec
Bronze	Muhammad Hafiz Hashim	Badminton	Men's singles	4 Dec
Bronze	Choong Tan Fook; Wong Choong Hann	Badminton	Men's doubles	4 Dec
Bronze	Chan Chong Ming; Koo Kien Keat	Badminton	Men's doubles	4 Dec
Bronze	Koo Kien Keat; Wong Pei Tty	Badminton	Mixed doubles	4 Dec
Bronze	Malaysia national badminton team: Chin Eei Hui; Wong Mew Choo; Wong Pei Tty; Sutheaswari Mudukasan; Ooi Sock Ai; Mooi Hing Yau; Julia Wong Pei Xian	Badminton	Women's team	30 Nov
Bronze	Moh Keen Hoo	Billiards and snooker	Men's snooker singles	
Bronze	Lean Kam Beng; Roslan Yurnalis	Billiards and snooker	Men's English billiards doubles	
Bronze	Ooi Fook Yuen	Billiards and snooker	Men's nine-ball singles	5 Dec
Bronze	Ibrahim Amir; Ooi Fook Yuen	Billiards and snooker	Men's fifteen-ball doubles	
Bronze	Daniel Lim Tow Chuang; Aaron Kong Eng Chuan	Bowling	Men's doubles	1 Dec
Bronze	Alex Liew Kien Liang; Ameran Zaidi; Ben Heng Boon Hian	Bowling	Men's trios	2 Dec
Bronze	Esther Cheah Mei Lan; Wendy Chai De Choo; Zandra Aziela Ibrahim	Bowling	Women's trios	2 Dec
Bronze	Zamzai Azizi Mohamad	Boxing	Men's light flyweight (48 kg)	3 Dec
Bronze	Eddey Kalai	Boxing	Men's featherweight (57 kg)	3 Dec
Bronze	Paunandes Paulus	Boxing	Men's lightweight (60 kg)	3 Dec
Bronze	Shahrulneeza Razali	Cycling	Men's individual time trial	2 Dec
Bronze	Cheong Jun Hoong	Diving	Women's 10 metre platform	29 Nov
Bronze	Cheong Jun Hoong; Leong Mun Yee	Diving	Women's synchronised 3 metre springboard	28 Nov
Bronze	Malaysia national under-23 football team: Saiful Amar Sudar; Mat Saiful Mohamad; Ahmad Azlan Zainal; Ronny Harun; Mohd Munir Amran; Mohd Fadzli Saari; Tengku Hasbullah Raja Hassan; Surendren Rasiah; Azlan Ismail; Sathia Kumaran Subramaniam; Zairo Anuar Zalani; Harizul Izuan Abdul Rani; Azi Shahril Azmi; Linggam Krishnan; Rudie Ramli; Thirumurugan Veeran; Muhammad Al-Hafiz Hamzah; Mohd Nor Farhan Muhammad; Mohd Badrul Azam Mohd Zamri; Mohd Nor Ismail; Amir Shahreen Abd Mubin; Muhd Zulkiffli Mohd Yusoff; Sumardi Hajalan; Mohamad Aslam Haja Najumudeen; Mohd Remezey Che Ros	Football	Men's tournament	5 Dec
Bronze	Chan Sau Wah; Nabihah Ali; Noor Hasleen Fatihin Binti Hasnan; Nurul Fatiha Abdul Hamid; Tan Kai Ling; Tracie Ang	Gymnastics	Women's artistic team all-around	30 Nov
Bronze	Durratun Nasihin Rosli	Gymnastics	Women's rhythmic individual all-around	4 Dec
Bronze	See Hui Yee	Gymnastics	Women's rhythmic ball	5 Dec
Bronze	Durratun Nasihin Rosli	Gymnastics	Women's rhythmic ribbon	5 Dec
Bronze	Chong Wei Keat	Judo	Men's 73 kg	3 Dec
Bronze	Tan Chee Keong	Judo	Men's 81 kg	3 Dec
Bronze	Md Nashriq Md Nassir	Judo	Men's 100 kg	2 Dec
Bronze	Ku Su Yin	Judo	Men's +100 kg	2 Dec
Bronze	Noor Maizura Zainon	Judo	Women's 48 kg	3 Dec
Bronze	Lim Yoke Wai	Karate	Men's individual kumite -65 kg	30 Nov
Bronze	Mahendran Supremaniam	Karate	Men's individual kumite open-weight	30 Nov
Bronze	Ku Jin Keat; Cheah Boon Chong; Tan Chee Seng	Karate	Men's team kata	29 Nov
Bronze	Yamini Gopalasamy	Karate	Women's individual kumite -60 kg	29 Nov
Bronze	Siti Zalina Ahmad	Lawn bowls	Women's singles	5 Dec
Bronze	Zamri Matnor	Pencak silat	Men's 80−85 kg	
Bronze	Siti Jameelah Mohammad Japilus	Pencak silat	Women's 50−55 kg	
Bronze	Malini Mohamad	Pencak silat	Women's 55−60 kg	5 Dec
Bronze	Mohd Faiza Mohamad; Shaari Hassan	Pétanque	Men's doubles	5 Dec
Bronze	Khor Seng Chye	Shooting	Men's double trap	5 Dec
Bronze	Teh Chee Fei	Shooting	Men's individual skeet	3 Dec
Bronze	Malaysia national softball team Ahmad Hafeez Hamdan; Zakaria Hamzah; Alvin Lee Softball Player; Mohd Khairmizi; Izat	Softball	Men's tournament	3 Dec
Bronze	Timothy Arnold	Squash	Men's singles	2 Dec
Bronze	Alex Lim Keng Liat	Swimming	Men's 100 metre butterfly	2 Dec
Bronze	Muhd Shakirin Ibrahim; Beh Lee Wei	Table tennis	Mixed doubles	2 Dec
Bronze	Mohd Afifuddin Omar Sidek	Taekwondo	Men's bantamweight (58−62 kg)	29 Nov
Bronze	Syed Taufiq Abd Hamid	Taekwondo	Men's featherweight (62−67 kg)	30 Nov
Bronze	Wong Kai Meng	Taekwondo	Men's welterweight (72−78 kg)	30 Nov
Bronze	Reig Lim	Taekwondo	Men's welterweight (+84 kg)	
Bronze	Noornadia Norrizan	Taekwondo	Women's flyweight (47−51 kg)	30 Nov
Bronze	Gayathri Arumugam	Taekwondo	Women's welterweight (63−67 kg)	30 Nov
Bronze	Malaysia national water polo team: Loo Jih Sheng; Albert Yeap Jin Teik; Danny Ng Chin Han; Teo Peng Jiew; Wong Khar Munn; Wong Khar Leon; Jimmy Shim Wai Chong; Lim How Jit; Kee Zhen Hao; Madhusudhan Varavindhakshan; Abdul Hafiz Salleh; Lai Cheng Loke; Kee Dow Liang	Water polo	Men's tournament	
Bronze	Muhamad Hidayat Hamidon	Weightlifting	Men's 77 kg	2 Dec
Bronze	Edmund Yeo Thien Chuan	Weightlifting	Men's 94 kg	
Bronze	Lim Yew Fai	Wushu	Men's jianshu	
Bronze	Chai Fong Wei	Wushu	Women's changquan	
Bronze	Chai Fong Wei	Wushu	Women's daoshu	

== Aquatics ==
=== Diving ===
Men

Athlete	Event	Preliminary		Final	
Athlete	Event	Score	Rank	Score	Rank
Yeoh Ken Nee	1 m springboard	—N/a		387.99	1st place, gold medalist(s)
Yeoh Ken Nee	3 m springboard	—N/a		676.41	1st place, gold medalist(s)
Bryan Nickson Lomas	10 m platform	—N/a		580.20	1st place, gold medalist(s)
Rossharisham Roslan; Yeoh Ken Nee	3 m synchronized springboard	—N/a		283.50	2nd place, silver medalist(s)
Bryan Nickson Lomas; James Sandayud	10 m synchronized platform	—N/a		299.94	2nd place, silver medalist(s)

Women

Athlete	Event	Preliminary		Final	
Athlete	Event	Score	Rank	Score	Rank
Leong Mun Yee	1 m springboard	—N/a		266.34	2nd place, silver medalist(s)
Leong Mun Yee	3 m springboard	—N/a		198.99	2nd place, silver medalist(s)
Cheong Jun Hoong	10 m platform	—N/a		440.43	3rd place, bronze medalist(s)
Leong Mun Yee	10 m platform	—N/a		472.86	1st place, gold medalist(s)
Cheong Jun Hoong; Leong Mun Yee	3 m synchronized springboard	—N/a		238.11	3rd place, bronze medalist(s)
Cheong Jun Hoong; Leong Mun Yee	10 m synchronized platform	—N/a		258.99	1st place, gold medalist(s)

=== Swimming ===
Men

Athlete	Event	Heats		Final	
Athlete	Event	Time	Overall rank	Time	Rank
Daniel Bego	100 m freestyle			52.35	2nd place, silver medalist(s)
Daniel Bego	200 m freestyle			1:52.67	1st place, gold medalist(s)
Alex Lim	100 m backstroke			56.97	1st place, gold medalist(s)
Alex Lim	200 m backstroke			2:03.48	1st place, gold medalist(s)
Alex Lim	100 m butterfly			56.26	3rd place, bronze medalist(s)
Daniel Bego	100 m butterfly			55.84	1st place, gold medalist(s)

Women

Athlete	Event	Heats		Final	
Athlete	Event	Time	Overall rank	Time	Rank
Ong Ming Xiu	400 m freestyle			4:23.76	2nd place, silver medalist(s)
Chui Lai Kwan	100 m backstroke			1:05.27	2nd place, silver medalist(s)

== Football ==
=== Men's tournament ===
Group A

Team	Pld	W	D	L	GF	GA	GD	Pts
Thailand	3	3	0	0	4	1	+3	9
Malaysia	3	2	0	1	10	4	+6	6
Philippines	3	1	0	2	6	7	−1	3
Cambodia	3	0	0	3	2	10	−8	0

21 November 2005
16:00

Malaysia	5 – 0	Cambodia

Panaad Stadium, Bacolod

27 November 2005
16:30

Thailand	2 – 1	Malaysia

Panaad Stadium, Bacolod

29 November 2005
17:00

Philippines	2 – 4	Malaysia

Panaad Stadium, Bacolod

Semifinal

2 December 2005
19:00

Vietnam	2 – 1	Malaysia
Pham Van Quyen 40'; Le Cong Vinh 56'	Report	Mohamad Nor Ismail 34'

Panaad Stadium, Bacolod

Bronze medal match

4 December 2005
16:00

Malaysia	1 – 0	Indonesia
Mohd. Khairul Azmi

Panaad Stadium, Bacolod
