= Karate at the 2005 SEA Games =

Karate competition

- Venue: Mandaue Coliseum
- Location: Mandaue City, Cebu
- Date: November 27–29

Karate at the 2005 SEA Games took place in the Mandaue Coliseum, Mandaue City, Cebu, Philippines. The participants competed in different weight categories in both the men's and women's competitions. The event was held from November 27–29.

== Medal table ==
* Host nation (Philippines)

Rank	Nation	Gold	Silver	Bronze	Total
1	Indonesia (INA)	5	5	4	14
2	Vietnam (VIE)	5	3	8	16
3	Malaysia (MAS)	4	6	4	14
4	Philippines (PHI)*	3	0	9	12
5	Thailand (THA)	1	1	4	6
6	Brunei (BRU)	0	3	1	4
7	Myanmar (MYA)	0	0	3	3
8	Singapore (SIN)	0	0	2	2
9	Laos (LAO)	0	0	1	1
Totals (9 entries)		18	18	36	72

== Medalists ==
=== Kata ===
Event	Gold	Silver	Bronze
Men's individual	Ku Jin Keat; Malaysia	Faizal Zainuddin; Indonesia	Noel Espinosa; Philippines
Men's individual	Ku Jin Keat; Malaysia	Faizal Zainuddin; Indonesia	Lê Xuân Hùng; Vietnam
Women's individual	Lim Lee Lee; Malaysia	Nguyễn Hoàng Ngân; Vietnam	Stephanie Lim; Philippines
Women's individual	Lim Lee Lee; Malaysia	Nguyễn Hoàng Ngân; Vietnam	Ng Pei Yi; Singapore
Men's team	Vietnam	Indonesia	Philippines
Men's team	Vietnam	Indonesia	Malaysia
Women's team	Vietnam	Malaysia	Indonesia
Women's team	Vietnam	Malaysia	Myanmar

=== Men's kumite ===
Event	Gold	Silver	Bronze
55 kg	Puvaneswaran Ramasamy; Malaysia	Eddie Jofriani Johari; Brunei	Phạm Trần Nguyên; Vietnam
55 kg	Puvaneswaran Ramasamy; Malaysia	Eddie Jofriani Johari; Brunei	Bambang Maulidin; Indonesia
60 kg	Kunasilan Lakanathan; Malaysia	Donny Dharmawan; Indonesia	Sein Win; Myanmar
60 kg	Kunasilan Lakanathan; Malaysia	Donny Dharmawan; Indonesia	P. Phouthvoung; Laos
65 kg	Nelson Pacalso; Philippines	Nguyễn Bảo Toàn; Vietnam	Ly Wai; Malaysia
65 kg	Nelson Pacalso; Philippines	Nguyễn Bảo Toàn; Vietnam	W. Kuaphol; Thailand
70 kg	Bùi Việt Bằng; Vietnam	Sim Chung Hiang; Brunei	Junel Perania; Philippines
70 kg	Bùi Việt Bằng; Vietnam	Sim Chung Hiang; Brunei	S. Suwam; Thailand
75 kg	Christo Mondolu; Indonesia	Rayner Kin Siong; Malaysia	Mai Xuân Lượng; Vietnam
75 kg	Christo Mondolu; Indonesia	Rayner Kin Siong; Malaysia	Tong Kit Siong; Brunei
+75 kg	Umar Syarief; Indonesia	Jarvis Julian; Malaysia	Joey Pabillore; Philippines
+75 kg	Umar Syarief; Indonesia	Jarvis Julian; Malaysia	Sanphasit Chonlaphan; Thailand
Open weight	Umar Syarief; Indonesia	Nguyễn Ngọc Thành; Vietnam	Mahendran Supremaniam; Malaysia
Open weight	Umar Syarief; Indonesia	Nguyễn Ngọc Thành; Vietnam	L. C. Jun; Singapore
Team	Indonesia	Malaysia	Philippines
Team	Indonesia	Malaysia	Vietnam

=== Women's kumite ===
Event	Gold	Silver	Bronze
48 kg	Vũ Thị Nguyệt Ánh; Vietnam	Telly Melinda; Indonesia	Mae Eso Soriano; Philippines
48 kg	Vũ Thị Nguyệt Ánh; Vietnam	Telly Melinda; Indonesia	Jittikan Tiemsurakan; Thailand
53 kg	Maria Marna Pabillore; Philippines	Yanisa Torrattanawathana; Thailand	Jenny Zeannet; Indonesia
53 kg	Maria Marna Pabillore; Philippines	Yanisa Torrattanawathana; Thailand	Đào Thị Tú Anh; Vietnam
60 kg	Nguyễn Thị Hải Yến; Vietnam	Puspa Meonk; Indonesia	Cherli Tugday; Philippines
60 kg	Nguyễn Thị Hải Yến; Vietnam	Puspa Meonk; Indonesia	Yamini Gopalasamy; Malaysia
+60 kg	Gretchen Malalad; Philippines	Jamaliah Jamaluddin; Malaysia	Nguyễn Thị Nga; Vietnam
+60 kg	Gretchen Malalad; Philippines	Jamaliah Jamaluddin; Malaysia	Puspita Triana Gustin; Indonesia
Open weight	Yanisa Torrattanawathana; Thailand	Yamini Gopalasamy; Malaysia	Nguyễn Thị Hải Yến; Vietnam
Open weight	Yanisa Torrattanawathana; Thailand	Yamini Gopalasamy; Malaysia	Gretchen Malalad; Philippines
Team	Indonesia	Malaysia	Myanmar
Team	Indonesia	Malaysia	Vietnam
