= Squash at the 2005 SEA Games =

Squash at the 2005 Southeast Asian Games
- Venue: Makati Sports Club
- Location: Makati, Metro Manila
- Date: November 29 – December 1

Squash at the 2005 Southeast Asian Games took place in the Makati Sports Club in Makati, Metro Manila, Philippines.

The event was held from November 29 to December 1.

Squash is an indoor racquet sport which was, until recently, called "Squash Rackets", a reference to the 'squashable' soft ball used in the game (compared with the harder ball used in its parent game Racquets or Rackets).

The game is played by two players, with 'standard' rackets (or occasionally four players for doubles) in a four-walled court with a small, hollow rubber ball.

== Medal table ==
* Host nation (Malaysia)

Rank	Nation	Gold	Silver	Bronze	Total
1	Malaysia (MAS)*	2	1	1	4
2	Indonesia (INA)	0	1	2	3
3	Philippines (PHI)	0	0	1	1
Totals (3 entries)		2	2	4	8

== Medalists ==
Event	Gold	Silver	Bronze
Men's singles	Mohd Nafiizwan Adnan; Malaysia	Borman Subroto; Indonesia	Robert Garcia; Philippines
Men's singles	Mohd Nafiizwan Adnan; Malaysia	Borman Subroto; Indonesia	Timothy Arnold; Malaysia
Women's singles	Sharon Wee; Malaysia	Tricia Chuah; Malaysia	Fanny Mokalu; Indonesia
Women's singles	Sharon Wee; Malaysia	Tricia Chuah; Malaysia	Junieta Mokalu; Indonesia
