= Bodybuilding at the 2005 SEA Games =

Bodybuilding at the 2005 Southeast Asian Games
- Venue: GSIS Building
- Location: Pasay, Metro Manila
- Date: December 1–4

Bodybuilding at the 2005 Southeast Asian Games was held at the Government Service Insurance System Theater in Pasay, Philippines. This sport is not included in the Olympic Games but is included as one of the events in the SEA Games since 2003.

As a sport, called competitive bodybuilding, bodybuilders display their physiques to a panel of judges, who assign points based on their aesthetic appearance.

== Medal table ==
* Host nation (Philippines)

Rank	Nation	Gold	Silver	Bronze	Total
1	Singapore	2	0	1	3
2	Philippines*	2	0	0	2
3	Thailand	1	1	2	4
3	Vietnam	1	1	2	4
5	Myanmar	0	3	0	3
6	Malaysia	0	1	0	1
7	Indonesia	0	0	1	1
Totals (7 entries)		6	6	6	18

== Medalists ==
=== Men ===
Event	Gold	Silver	Bronze
Light flyweight 55 kg	Phạm Văn Mách; Vietnam	Zaw Wan; Myanmar	Vincent Ng Han Cheng; Singapore
Flyweight; 60 kg	Ibrahim Sihat; Singapore	Somsri Turinthaisong; Thailand	Andy Arselawandi; Indonesia
Bantamweight; 65 kg	Michael Borenaga; Philippines	Sazali Abd Samad; Malaysia	Thongpan Lammana; Thailand
Lightweight; 70 kg	Simon Chua Ling Fung; Singapore	Aung Khaing Win; Myanmar	Cao Quốc Phú; Vietnam
Welterweight; 75 kg	Alfredo Trazona; Philippines	Giáp Trí Dũng; Vietnam	Panupong Prapteep; Thailand
Light middleweight 80 kg	Sitthi Charoenrith; Thailand	Min Zaw Oo; Myanmar	Lý Đức; Vietnam
