= Athletics at the 2005 SEA Games =

- Venue: Rizal Memorial Sports Complex
- Location: Malate, Manila, Philippines
- Date: 27–30 November 2005
- Nations: 11

The athletics events at the 2005 SEA Games were held at the Rizal Memorial Sports Complex in Malate, Manila, Philippines. The Marathon event was run from the Diosdado Macapagal Boulevard, Pasay, Philippines on December 4, 2005.

== Medal table ==
* Host nation (Philippines)

Rank	Nation	Gold	Silver	Bronze	Total
1	Thailand	12	13	19	44
2	Philippines*	9	11	9	29
3	Vietnam	8	8	4	20
4	Malaysia	8	3	3	14
5	Myanmar	4	3	1	8
6	Singapore	3	1	4	8
7	Indonesia	1	6	5	12
Totals (7 entries)		45	45	45	135

== Medalists ==
=== Men ===
Event	Gold		Silver		Bronze	
100 m	Wachara Sondee; Thailand	10.47	Sompote Suwannarangsri; Thailand	10.52	Suryo Agung Wibowo; Indonesia	10.57
200 m	Sittichai Suwonprateep; Thailand	20.94	John Herman Muray; Indonesia	21.27	Sompote Suwannarangsri; Thailand	21.40
400 m	Jimar Aing; Philippines	47.03	Ernie Candelario; Philippines	47.06	Mohd Zafril Mohd Zuslaini; Malaysia	47.25
800 m	Lê Văn Dương; Vietnam	1:51.15	Midel Dique; Philippines	1:51.53	John Lozada; Philippines	1:51.57
1500 m	Aung Thi Ha; Myanmar	3:49.25	Hariyono; Indonesia	3:50.40	Rene Herrera; Philippines	3:50.89
5000 m	Boonthung Srisung; Thailand	14:15.09	Julius Sermona; Philippines	14:45.44	Amnuay Tongmit; Thailand	15:24.05
10000 m	Boonthung Srisung; Thailand	29:29.59 (NR)	Eduardo Buenavista; Philippines	29:49.77	Julius Sermona; Philippines	30:45.45
110 m hurdles	Mohd Robani Hassan; Malaysia	14.08	Muhd Faiz Mohammad; Malaysia	14.16	Narongdech Janjai; Thailand	14.22
400 m hurdles	Shahadan Jamaludin; Malaysia	51.28; NR	Apisit Kuttiyawan; Thailand	51.54	Zulkarnain Purba; Indonesia	51.61
3000 m steeplechase	Rene Herrera; Philippines	8:56.14	Trần Văn Thắng; Vietnam	9:07.89	Patikarn Pechsricha; Thailand	9:13.27
4 × 100 m relay	Thailand; Wachara Sondee; Sompote Suwannarangsri; Ekkachai Janthana; Sittichai Suwonprateep	39.74	Philippines; Arnold Villarube; Ralph Waldy Soguilon; Albert Salcedo; Henry Dagmil	40.55 (NR)	Singapore; Mohd Shameer Mohd Ayub; Erzalmaniq Fawy Rawi; Poh Seng Song; Umagua Kancanangai Shaym	40.59
4 × 400 m relay	Philippines; Kashus Perona; Jimar Aing; Julius Nieras; Ernie Candelario	3:09.15	Thailand; Supachi Phachsay; Banjong Lachua; Jukkatip Pojaroen; Apisit Kuttiyawan	3:10.53	Malaysia; Jayakumar Dewarajoo; Shahadan Jamaludin; Amran Raj Krishnan; Mohd Zafril Mohd Zuslaini	3:23.27
Marathon	Boonchoo Jandacha; Thailand	2:29:27	Roy Vence; Philippines	2:30:11	Allan Ballester; Philippines	2:32:25
20 km walk	Mohd Sharrulhaizy Abdul Rahman; Malaysia	1:35:45.1	Thiru Kumaran Balay Sendram; Malaysia	1:36:27.4	Veerapun Anunchai; Thailand	1:42:39.7
High jump	Nguyễn Duy Bằng; Vietnam	2.14 m	Nguyễn Thành Phong; Vietnam	2.11 m	Chokchai Jirasukrujee; Thailand	2.11 m
Pole vault	Amnat Kunpadit; Thailand	4.90 m	Sompong Saombankuay; Thailand	4.80 m	Emerson Obiena; Philippines	4.60 m
Long jump	Henry Dagmil; Philippines	7.81 m	Mohd Syahrul Amri Md Suhaimi; Malaysia	7.69 m	Kittisak Sukon; Thailand	7.54 m
Triple jump	Theerayut Philakong; Thailand	16.00 m	Joebert Delicano; Philippines	15.92 m	Nattaporn Nomkanha; Thailand	15.75 m
Shot put	Chatchawal Polyeng; Thailand	17.06 m	Sarayudh Pinitjit; Thailand	16.66 m	James Wong Tuck Yim; Singapore	12.66 m
Discus throw	James Wong Tuck Yim; Singapore	55.11 m	Wansawang Sawasdee; Thailand	52.51 m	Kvanchai Numsomboon; Thailand	51.31 m
Hammer throw	Arniel Ferrera; Philippines	60.47 m CR	Jerro Perater; Philippines	53.44 m	Yongjaros Kanju; Thailand	52.74 m
Javelin throw	Danilo Fresnido; Philippines	70.20 m	Sanya Buathong; Thailand	66.09 m	Dandy Gallenero; Philippines	65.80 m
Decathlon	Vũ Văn Huyện; Vietnam	7139 pts	Boonkete Chalon; Thailand	7034 pts	Bùi Văn Hà; Vietnam	6937 pts

=== Women ===
Event	Gold		Silver		Bronze	
100 m	Vũ Thị Hương; Vietnam	11.49	Nongnuch Sanrat; Thailand	11.63	Orranut Klomdee; Thailand	11.66
200 m	Kay Khine Lwin; Myanmar	23.77	Vũ Thị Hương; Vietnam	23.86	Jutamass Thavoncharoen; Thailand	23.97
400 m	Yin Yin Khine; Myanmar	52.69; NR	Kay Khine Lwin; Myanmar	54.10	Saowalee Kaewchuy; Thailand	54.88
800 m	Đỗ Thị Bông; Vietnam	2:03.65	Yin Yin Khine; Myanmar	2:04.11	Trương Thanh Hằng; Vietnam	2:04.60
1500 m	Trương Thanh Hằng; Vietnam	4:18.50	Đỗ Thị Bông; Vietnam	4:21.46	Olivia Sadi; Indonesia	4:22.39
5000 m	Olivia Sadi; Indonesia	16:34.94	Mercedita Manipol; Philippines	16:42.17	Rini Budiarti; Indonesia	16:43.82
10000 m	Mercedita Manipol; Philippines	35.38.04	Pa Pa; Myanmar	35.39.08	Trương Thị Mai; Vietnam	37.00.82
100 m hurdles	Moh Siew Wei; Malaysia	13.54	Dedeh Erawati; Indonesia	13.58	Trecia Roberts; Thailand	14.25
400 m hurdles	Wassana Winatho; Thailand	57.20	Nguyễn Thị Nụ; Vietnam	1:00.37	Mary Grace Melgar; Philippines	1:01.37
4 × 100 m relay	Thailand; Orranut Klomdee; Jutamass Thavoncharoen; Sangwan Jaksunin; Nongnuch Sanrat	44.30	Vietnam; Lê Ngọc Phượng; Vũ Thị Hương; Hoàng Thị Thu Hương; Mai Thị Phương	45.11; NR	Indonesia; Deysie Natalia Sumigar; Irene Truitje Joseph; Serafi Anelies Unani; Supiati	46.01
4 × 400 m relay	Myanmar; Yin Yin Khine; Myint Myint Aye; Kyaw Swar Moe; Kay Khine Lwin	3:35.68	Thailand; Yuangjan Panthakarn; Wassana Winatho; Sunantha Kinnareewong; Saowalee Kaewchuy	3:39.49	Vietnam; Lê Thị Hồng Anh; Nguyễn Thị Thắm; Nguyễn Thị Nụ; Nguyễn Thị Bắc	3:43.91
Marathon	Christabel Martes; Philippines	2:47:07	Feri Marince Subnafeu; Indonesia	2:54:23	Pa Pa; Myanmar	2:54:55
20 km walk	Yuan Yufang; Malaysia	1:42:52.2	Darwati; Indonesia	1:52:13.4	Tanaphon Peamsakun; Thailand	1:53:52.6
High jump	Bùi Thị Nhung; Vietnam	1.89 m	Nguyễn Thị Ngọc Thy; Vietnam	1.86 m	Noengrothai Chaipetch; Thailand	1.83 m
Pole vault	Rosalinda Samsu; Malaysia	4.10 m	Lê Thị Phương; Vietnam	4.00 m	Sanisa Kao-iad; Thailand	3.60 m
Long jump	Marestella Torres; Philippines	6.47 m	Lerma Elmira Gabito; Philippines	6.45 m	Sin Mei Ngew; Malaysia	6.27 m NR
Triple jump	Sin Mei Ngew; Malaysia	13.61 m	Wacharee Ritthiwat; Thailand	13.20 m	Thitima Muangjan; Thailand	13.00 m
Shot put	Zhang Guirong; Singapore	17.40 m	Du Xianhui; Singapore	17.37 m	Juthaporn Krasaeyan; Thailand	14.15 m
Discus throw	Du Xianhui; Singapore	49.48 m	Juthaporn Krasaeyan; Thailand	48.93 m	Zhang Guirong; Singapore	48.62 m
Hammer throw	Siti Shahidah Abdullah; Malaysia	53.35 m CR	Yurita Arianny Arsyad; Indonesia	49.75 m	Loralie Amahit; Philippines	48.63 m
Javelin throw	Buoban Pamang; Thailand	55.06 m	Rosie Villarito; Philippines	49.43 m	Zhang Guirong; Singapore	48.70 m
Heptathlon	Nguyễn Thị Thu Cúc; Vietnam	5350 pts	Watchaporn Masin; Thailand	5327 pts	Narcisa Atienza; Philippines	5231 pts

== Games Records ==
- Women's High Jump: Vietnam's Bui Thi Nhung, 1.89m

(previous record of 1.88m was set in 1997 by Thailand's Achalach Kerdchang)

- Women's Pole Vault: Malaysia's Rosalinda Samsu, 4.1m

(previous record of ? was set in ? by ?)

- Women's 800m: Vietnam's Do Thi Bong - 2’03’’65

(previous record of 2’03’’75 was set in 1985 by Thailand's Sasithorn Chanthanuhong.)

- Women's 1500m: Vietnam's Truong Thanh Hang - 4'18’’50

(previous record of 4'19’’42 was set in 2003 by Vietnam's Nguyen Lan Anh.)

- Men's Long Jump: Philippines' Henry Dagmil, 7.81m

(previous record of 7.79m was set in 1997 by Malaysia's Mohd Zaki Sadri)

- Men's hammer Throw: Philippines' Arniel Ferrera, Score:60.47

(previous record of 58.80 s was set in 1993 by Indonesia's Dudung Suhendri)

== See also ==
- 2005 in athletics (track and field)
