= Vietnam at the 2005 SEA Games =

Vietnam at the 2005 Southeast Asian Games
- IOC code: VIE
- NOC: Vietnam Olympic Committee
- Website: www.voc.org.vn (in Vietnamese and English)

in the Manila
- Competitors: 516
- Flag bearer: Nguyet Van Hung
- Medals Ranked 3rd: Gold 71 Silver 68 Bronze 89 Total 228

Southeast Asian Games appearances (overview)
- 1989; 1991; 1993; 1995; 1997; 1999; 2001; 2003; 2005; 2007; 2009; 2011; 2013; 2015; 2017; 2019; 2021; 2023; 2025; 2027; 2029

Vietnam competed at the 2005 Southeast Asian Games in the Philippines under the IOC country code VIE. By sending a delegation of 516 athletes and competing in 33 out of 40 sports and in 352 out of a total of 439 events, it aimed for a top three placing in the medals table. The final result showed that the Vietnamese team has attained its goal by ranking first in the medal tally with 18 gold, 24 silver and 11 bronze medals. The chief of mission to the games was Nguyen Hong Minh.

== Medals ==
Rank	Sport	Gold	Silver	Bronze	Total
1	Athletics	8	8	3	19
2	Chess	8	2	2	12
3	Wushu	7	9	4	20
4	Pencak Silat	7	3	2	12
5	Wrestling	6	4	0	10
6	Gymnastics	5	4	5	14
7	Karatedo	5	3	9	17
8	Judo	4	2	8	14
9	Taekwondo	4	1	8	13
10	Shooting	3	5	6	14
11	Arnis	3	3	0	6
12	Fencing	2	4	7	13
13	Billiards and Snooker	2	4	0	6
14	Cycling	2	0	3	5
15	Rowing	1	2	1	4
16	Canoeing	1	1	3	5
17	Body building	1	1	2	4
18	Football	1	1	0	2
19	Swimming	1	0	0	1
20	Boxing	0	3	4	7
21	Aquatics - Diving	0	3	0	3
22	Sepak takraw	0	2	0	2
23	Petanque	0	1	4	5
23	Weightlifting	0	1	4	5
25	Table tennis	0	1	2	3
26	Volleyball	0	1	1	2
27	Tennis	0	0	2	2
28	Badminton	0	0	1	1
Totals (28 entries)		71	69	81	221

=== Gold ===
- Athletics
  - Women high-jump: Bui Thi Nhung - 1.89 m - New Southeast Asian Games record.
  - Women 100 m: Vu Thi Huong
  - Men 800 m: Le Van Duong
  - Women 800 m: Do Thi Bong - 2’03’’65 - New Southeast Asian Games record
  - Men high-jump: Nguyen Duy Bang - 2.14 m
  - Women 1500 m: Truong Thanh Hang - 4'18’’50 - New Southeast Asian Games record
  - Men decathlon: Vu Van Huyen
  - Women Heptathlon: Nguyen Thi Thu Cuc
- Karatedo
  - Women Team Kata
  - Men Team Kata
  - Men Individual Kumite -70 kg: Bui Viet Bang
  - Women Individual Kumite -60 kg: Nguyen Thi Hai Yen
  - Women Individual Kumite -48 kg: Vu Thi Nguyet Anh
- Wushu
  - Women Taolu - Gunshu: Dam Thanh Xuan
  - Women Taolu - Quingshu: Nguyen Thi My Duc
  - Women Taolu - Changquan: Nguyen Thi My Duc
  - Men Taolu - Changquan: Nguyen Tien Dat
  - Women Taolu - Taijiquan - Taijijan: Bui Mai Phuong
  - Women Shanshu -45 kg: Bui Thi Nhu Trang
  - Men Shanshu -56 kg: Tran Nhat Huy
- Cycling
  - Women - Mountain - Downhill: Phan Thi Thuy Trang
  - Men 40 km time trial: Mai Cong Hieu
- Shooting
  - Men 50 m pistol (60 shots): Nguyen Manh Tuong
  - Women 10 m Air Pistol (40 Shots): Dam Thi Nga
  - Men 50 m Rifle Prone (60 shots): ?
- Fencing:
  - Women Individual Sabre: Nguyen Thi Le Dung
  - Women Team Sabre
- Chess
  - Men Individual Rapid chess: GM Nguyen Ngoc Truong Son
  - Men Team Rapid chess
  - Men Individual 'Blitz' chess: GM Nguyen Anh Dung
  - Women Individual 'Blitz' chess: Nguyen Quynh Anh
  - Men standard chess: GM Nguyen Ngoc Truong Son
  - Women standard chess: Nguyen Thi Thanh An
  - Men standard chess team
  - Women standard chess team
- Wrestling
  - Men -55 kg: Nguyen Van Hop
  - Men -84 kg: Man Ba Xuan
  - Women -55 kg: Nghiem Thi Giang
  - Men -60 kg: Doi Dang Hy
  - Men -74 kg: Le Duy Hoi
  - Women -63 kg: Luong Thi Quyen
- Taekwondo:
  - Women -51 kg: Do Thi Bich Hanh
  - Women -47 kg: Nguyen Thi Huyen Dieu (her 4th gold medal in a row since 1999)
  - Men -84 kg: Nguyen Trong Cuong
  - Men +84: Nguyen Van Hung (his 4th Gold medal in a row since 1999)
- Gymnastics
  - Women artistic individual - all round: Do Thi Ngan Thuong
  - Women balance beam: Do Thi Ngan Thuong
  - Men Pommel Horse: Truong Minh Sang
  - Men's Rings: Nguyen Minh Tuan
  - Men Parallel Bars: Pham Phuoc Hung
- Swimming:
  - Men 100 m breast stroke: Nguyen Huu Viet
- Billiards and Snooker:
  - Men's English Billiards Single: Nguyen Thanh Long
  - Men billiards caroom: Nguyen Thanh Binh
- Rowing:
  - Women double sculls: Mai Thi Dung & Dang Thi Tham
- Judo:
  - Women -48 kg: Van Ngoc Tu
  - Women -63 kg: Nguyen Thi Nhu Y
  - Men -55 kg: Nguyen Duy Khanh
  - Men -60 kg: Tran Van Doat
- Arnis:
  - Men Individual: Nguyen Quang Tung
  - Women Individual: Nguyen Thi My
  - Men -71 kg: Nguyen Thanh Quyen
- Football:
  - Women team
- Pencak silat:
  - Men -55 kg: Tran Van Toan
  - Women -65 kg: Nguyen Thi Phuong Thuy
  - Men -60 kg: Nguyen Ba Trinh
  - Women -60 kg: Trinh Thi Nga
  - Women -55 kg: Huynh Thi Thu Hong
  - Women -50 kg: Le Thi Hang
  - Men +90 kg: Nguyen Van Hung
- Canoeing:
  - Men 500 m C1: Nguyen Duc Canh
- Bodybuilding:
  - Men -55 kg: Pham Van Mach
- Tennis
  - ?

=== Silver ===
- Athletics
  - Women high-jump: Nguyen Thi Ngoc Tam - 1.86 m.
  - Women pole vault: Le Thi Phuong - 4.00 m
  - Men high-jump: Nguyen Thanh Phong - 2.11 m
  - Men 3000 m Steeplechase: Tran Van Thang
  - Women 400 m hurdle: Nguyen Thi Nu
  - Women 1500 m: Do Thi Bong
  - Women 4 × 100 m relay
  - Women 200 m: Vu Thi Huong
- Diving
  - Women’s 10-meter synchronized platform: Hoang Thanh Tra & Nguyen Hoai Anh
  - Women’s 3-meter springboard individual: Hoang Thanh Tra
  - Women's 3 meter synchronized springboard
- Karatedo
  - Women Individual kata: Nguyen Hoang Ngan
  - Men Individual Kumite -65 kg: Nguyen Bao Toan
  - Men Individual Kumite (open weight): Nguyen Ngoc Thach
- Taekwondo:
  - Men’s -58 kg: Vu Anh Tuan
- Fencing:
  - Women Individual Épée: Nguyen Thi Nhu Hoa
  - Men Individual Épée: Do Huu Cuong
  - Women Team Foil
  - Men’s foil team
- Wushu
  - Women Taolu - Nanquan: Nguyen Thi Ngoc Oanh
  - Men Taolu - Gunshu: Nguyen Tien Dat
  - Men Taolu - Qiangshu: Nguyen Van Cuong
  - Men Taolu - Diaullien/Duel Event: Nguyen Tien Dat & Tran Duc Trong
  - Women Sanshou -52 kg: Ngo Thi Ha
  - Men Sanshou -48 kg: Le Minh Tung
  - Men Sanshou -70 kg: Nguyen Duc Trung
  - Women Taolu - Daoshu: Dam Thanh Xuan
  - Women Taolu - Diaullien/Duel Event: Nguyen Thi My Duc & Vu Tra My
- Billiards and Snooker
  - Men 8 Ball Pool Doubles: Nguyen Phuoc Long & Nguyen Thanh Nam
  - Men 9 Ball Doubles: Nguyen Thanh Nam & Luong Chi Dung
  - Men billiards caroom: Le Phuoc Loi
  - Men individual 9-ball billiard: Luong Tri Dung
- Gymnastics:
  - Women Artistic Team
  - Women Artistic Individual all round: Nguyen Thuy Duong
  - Men Parallel Bars: Nguyen Ha Thanh
  - Sport Aerobics: Mixed doubles: Nguyen Tan Thanh & Nguyen Thi Thanh Hien
- Wrestling
  - Men -66 kg: Phan Duc Thang
  - Women -48 kg: Nguyen Thi Hang
  - Women -51 kg: Nguyen Thi Thu
  - Men -96 kg: Nguyen Van Duc
- Rowing:
  - Women double sculls: Pham Thi Hien & Nguyen Thi Thi
  - Men single sculls: Phan Thanh Hao
- Table tennis:
  - Men Team
- Shooting:
  - Men 10 m air rifle: Nguyen Tan Nam
  - Men 25 m standard pistol: Nguyen Manh Tuong
  - Women Skeet Individual - Shotgun (75 Targets): Nguyen Thi Duc Hanh
  - Women 50 m Rifle 3-Position: Nguyen Thi Hang
  - Women double trap: Hoang Thi Tuat
- Sepak Takraw:
  - Women Hoop Team
  - Women Regu team
- Pencak Silat:
  - Men team performance: Nguyen Huy Bao, Nguyen Dang Linh and Le Quang Dung
  - Men individual performance: Nguyen Viet Anh
  - Men -75 kg: Dinh Cong Son
- Weightlifting:
  - Women -63 kg: Nguyen Thi Thiet
- Judo:
  - Women -52 kg: Do Khanh Van
  - Women -57 kg: Nguyen Thi Kieu
- Arnis:
  - Men team: Nguyen Thanh Tung, Tran Thanh Tung & Tran Duc Nghia
  - Women team: Nguyen Thu Ha, Vu Thi Thao & Nguyen Thi Loan
  - Women -52 kg: Nguyen Thi Thanh Huyen
- Boxing:
  - Women -50 kg: Vu Thi Hai Yen
  - Women -54 kg: Ta Thi Minh Nghia
  - Men -51 kg: Tran Quoc Viet
- Canoeing:
  - Men 500 m MK2: Tran Huu Tri & Nguyen Khanh Thanh
- Bodybuilding:
  - Men -75 kg: Giap Tri Dung
- Football:
  - Men football team
- Petanque:
  - Women team
- Volleyball:
  - Women team
- Chess:
  - Women individual standard chess: Le Thanh Tu
  - Men Individual standard chess: Le Quang Liem

=== Bronze ===
- Karatedo
  - Men Individual Kata: Le Xuan Hung
  - Men Team kumite
  - Women Team kumite
  - Women Individual Kumite +60 kg: Nguyen Thi Nga
  - Men Individual Kumite -55 kg: Pham Tran Nguyen
  - Men Individual Kumite -60 kg: Vo Manh Tuan
  - Men Individual Kumite -75 kg: Mai Xuan Luong
  - Women Individual Kumite -53 kg: Dao Tu Anh
  - Women Individual Kumite (open weight): Nguyen Thi Hai Yen
- Tennis
  - Men Team
  - Women Team
- Wushu
  - Women Taolu - Gunshu: Lam Kieu My Dung
  - Women Taolu - Nanquan: Nguyen Thi Thuy Duong
  - Women Taolu - Quingshu: Vu Tra My
  - Men Taolu - Gunshu: Truong Quoc Chi
- Athletics
  - Women 10,000 m: Truong Thi Mai
  - Men decathlon: Bui Van Ha
  - Women 4 × 400 m Relay
- Fencing:
  - Women Individual Épée: Ha Thi Sen
  - Men’s individual sabre: Nguyen Van Que
  - Women's individual foil: Nguyen Thi Tuoi
  - Men's individual foil: Bui Van Thai
  - Men Team Épée
  - Women Team Épée
  - Men Team Sabre
- Taekwondo:
  - Men's -72 kg: Cao Trong Chinh
  - Women -63 kg: Bui Thu Hien
  - Women -55 kg: Le Thi Thu Nguyet
  - Men -58 kg: Dinh Thanh Long
  - Women -59 kg: Nguyen Thi Hoai Thu
  - Women -67 kg: Nguyen Thi Ngoc Tram
  - Women -72 kg: Tran Thi Ngoc Tram
  - Women +72 kg: Tran Thi Ngoc Bich
- Cycling:
  - Women cross-country: Nguyen Thanh Dam
  - Women 27 km time trial: Nguyen Thi Hoang Oanh
  - Men 170 km: Trinh Phat Dat
- Shooting
  - Men trap team
  - Men 10 m Air Pistol (60 Shots): Hoang Xuan Vinh
  - Women 25 m pistol (30+30): Pham Thi Ha
  - Men 25 m standard pistol: Pham Cao Son
  - Men 25 m Center Fire Pistol (30+30): Nguyen Manh Tuong
  - Women 50 m Rifle 3-Position: Nguyen Thi Hoa
- Gymnastics:
  - Men Artistic Team
  - Women Uneven Bars: Nguyen Thuy Duong
  - Women Floor exercise: Phan Thi Ha Thanh
  - Women Balance beam: Phan Thi Ha Thanh
  - Women Rhythmic - Team Championship
- Rowing:
  - Men double sculls: Hoang Duc Tan & Nguyen Hoang Anh
- Badminton
  - Men Team
- Volleyball:
  - Men Indoor Team
- Judo:
  - Men -100 kg: Ly Huynh Long
  - Men +100 kg: Dang Hao
  - Women -45 kg: Dang Le Bich Van
  - Women -70 kg: Nguyen Thi Dinh
  - Men -73 kg: Nguyen Tran Minh Nhut
  - Men -66 kg: Nguyen Quoc Hung
  - Women +78 kg: Dinh Thi Diem Tuyen
  - Women -78 kg: Nguyen Thi Anh Ngoc
- Weightlifting:
  - Women -48 kg: Nguyen Thi Bich Ha
  - Men -85 kg: Luu Van Thang
  - Men -94 kg: Vu Hong Phong
  - Women -69 kg: Khuat Minh Hai
- Pencak Silat:
  - Women team performance
  - Women individual performance
- Table tennis:
  - Men doubles: Tran Tuan Quynh & Nguyen Nam Hai
  - Men single: Doan Kien Quoc
- Chess:
  - Men 'blitz' individual: Nguyen Ngoc Truong Son
  - Women 'blitz' individual: Hoang Thi Bao Tram
- Canoeing:
  - Women 500 Meter K1: Doan Thi Cach
  - Women 500 m WK4: Doan Thi Cach, Bui Thi Phuong, Nguyen Thi Loan & Nguyen Thi Hoa
  - Women 500 m WK2: Nguyen Thi Ha & Nguyen Thi Loan
- Bodybuilding:
  - Men -70 kg: Cao Quoc Phu
  - Men -80 kg: Ly Duc
- Petanque:
  - Women individual
  - Women doubles
  - Men doubles
  - Men team
- Boxing:
  - Men -60 kg: Do Duc Thanh
  - Women -60 kg: Dinh Thi Phuong Thanh
  - Men ?
  - Men ?
