= Nur Atikah Nabilah =

Singaporean artistic gymnast

- Born: November 27, 1991 (age 34) Singapore

Gymnastics career
- Discipline: Women's artistic gymnastics
- Country represented: Singapore
- Head coach: GIMSPORTS Pte Ltd (2017,2018)
Medal record
Southeast Asian Games
Gold medal – first place	2005 Manila	Team
Gold medal – first place	2007 Thailand	Team
Gold medal – first place	2011 Jakarta	Team

Nur Atikah Nabilah (born 27 November 1991, in Singapore), is a gymnast. Nabilah was part of the team that won the team gold medal at the 2005, 2007 & 2011 Southeast Asian Games.
