= Lawn bowls at the 2005 SEA Games =

Lawn bowls competition

Lawn bowls at the 2005 Southeast Asian Games
- Venue: Hidden Vale Sports Club
- Location: Clark Special Economic Zone, Angeles City
- Date: December 1–4

Lawn bowls at the 2005 Southeast Asian Games took place in the Hidden Vale Sports Club in Angeles City, Philippines.

The event was held from December 1–4.

== Rules ==
Lawn bowls is a precision sport where the goal is to roll slightly radially asymmetrical balls (called bowls) closer to a smaller white ball (the "jack" or "kitty") than one's opponent is able to do. It is related to bocce and pétanque.

The game is usually played on a large, rectangular, precisely levelled and manicured grass or synthetic surface known as a bowling green, but an indoor variation on carpet is also played. In the simplest competition, singles, one of the two opponents begins a segment of the competition (in bowling parlance, an "end"), by placing the mat and rolling the jack to the other end of the green as a target. Once it has come to rest, the players take turns to roll their bowls from the mat towards the jack and thereby build up the "head". Bowls reaching the ditch are dead and removed from play, except in the event when one has "touched" the jack on its way. "Touchers" are marked with chalk and remain alive in play even though they are in the ditch. Similarly if the jack is knocked into the ditch it is still alive unless it is out of bounds to the side resulting in a "dead" end which is replayed. After each competitor has delivered all of their bowls (four each in singles), the distance of the closest bowls to the jack is determined (the jack may have been displaced) and points are awarded for each bowl which a competitor has closer than the opponent's nearest to the jack. For instance, if a competitor has bowled two bowls closer to the jack than their competitor's nearest, they are awarded two points. The exercise is then repeated for the next end.

== Medal table ==
* Host nation (Philippines)

Rank	Nation	Gold	Silver	Bronze	Total
1	Malaysia (MAS)	3	2	1	6
2	Philippines (PHI)*	1	3	2	6
3	Thailand (THA)	1	1	3	5
4	Brunei (BRU)	1	0	0	1
Totals (4 entries)		6	6	6	18

== Medalists ==
=== Men ===
Event	Gold	Silver	Bronze
Singles	Ronald Lising; Philippines	Syed Mohamad Syed Akil; Malaysia	Sakprasert Mitsaha; Thailand
Pairs	Malaysia; Fairul Izwan Abd Muin; Safuan Said	Philippines; Leo Carreon; Christopher Dagpin	Thailand; Thira Maithai; Sudharm Phonghanyudh
Triples	Brunei; Pg Md Salleh Chuchu Pg Hj Tuah; Haji Naim Brahim; Lokman Mohammad Salleh	Malaysia; Khairul Annuar Abdul Kadir; Megat Mohammad Nazim Zainuddin; Azwan Shuhaimi	Philippines; Reynaldo Samia; Angelo Morales; Herminio Dagpin

=== Women ===
Event	Gold	Silver	Bronze
Singles	Songsin Tsao; Thailand	Paula Francisco; Philippines	Siti Zalina Ahmad; Malaysia
Pairs	Malaysia; Bah Chu Mei; Haslah Hassan	Thailand; Kornkamon Phonghanyudh; Vivatana Vudhadhirom	Philippines; Ronalyn Greenlees; Amy Gardoce
Triples	Malaysia; Nor Iryani Azmi; Azlina Arshad; Nor Hashimah Ismail	Philippines; Ellenita Atkins; Sonia Bruce; Rosita Bradborn	Thailand; Thong Oomen; Saengjan Wareeram; Netnadha Lapchareon
