= Brunei at the SEA Games =

Brunei at the Southeast Asian Games
- IOC code: BRU
- NOC: Brunei Darussalam National Olympic Council
- Website: www.bruneiolympic.org (in English)
- Medals Ranked 10th: Gold 17 Silver 57 Bronze 170 Total 244

Southeast Asian Games appearances (overview)
- 1977; 1979; 1981; 1983; 1985; 1987; 1989; 1991; 1993; 1995; 1997; 1999; 2001; 2003; 2005; 2007; 2009; 2011; 2013; 2015; 2017; 2019; 2021; 2023; 2025; 2027; 2029

Brunei Darussalam competes in the Southeast Asian Games since the 1977 edition of the games in Kuala Lumpur, Malaysia where they won their first 3 Bronze Medals. Brunei hosted and competed in the 1999 Southeast Asian Games in Bandar Seri Begawan and finished tenth in the overall total rankings with 4 Gold Medals, 12 Silver Medals and 31 Bronze Medals and is their current best performance in the games.

== Medal tally ==
All-time Medal tally
Games	Athletes	1st place, gold medalist(s)	2nd place, silver medalist(s)	3rd place, bronze medalist(s)	Total	Rank
(Malaysia) 1977 Kuala Lumpur	?	0	0	3	3	7th
(Indonesia) 1979 Jakarta	?	0	1	0	1	7th
(Philippines) 1981 Manila	?	0	0	0	0	7th
1983 Singapore	?	0	0	5	5	7th
(Thailand) 1985 Bangkok	?	0	0	3	3	7th
(Indonesia) 1987 Jakarta	?	1	5	17	23	7th
(Malaysia) 1989 Kuala Lumpur	?	1	2	4	7	8th
(Philippines) 1991 Manila	?	0	0	8	8	8th
1993 Singapore	?	0	0	0	0	9th
(Thailand) 1995 Chiang Mai	?	0	2	6	8	8th
(Indonesia) 1997 Jakarta	?	0	2	8	10	8th
(Brunei) 1999 Bandar Seri Begawan	370	4	12	31	47	7th
(Malaysia) 2001 Kuala Lumpur	147	0	5	6	11	10th
(Vietnam) 2003 Ho Chi Minh	?	1	1	8	10	10th
(Philippines) 2005 Manila	271	1	2	2	5	9th
(Thailand) 2007 Nakhon Ratchasima	61	1	1	4	6	10th
(Laos) 2009 Vientiane	74	1	1	8	10	10th
(Indonesia) 2011 Jakarta and Palembang	60	0	4	7	11	11th
(Myanmar) 2013 Nay Pyi Taw	72	1	1	6	10	11th
2015 Singapore	82	0	1	6	7	10th
(Malaysia) 2017 Kuala Lumpur	105	0	5	9	14	10th
2019 Philippines	87	2	5	6	13	9th
2021 Vietnam	24	1	1	1	3	10th
2023 Cambodia	65	2	1	6	9	10th
2025 Thailand	65	1	3	5	9	9th
Total		17	55	159	231	10th

== Medal summary ==
=== Medal by sport ===
Medals by sport
Sport	1st place, gold medalist(s)	2nd place, silver medalist(s)	3rd place, bronze medalist(s)	Total
Athletics	0	0	1	1
Boxing	0	0	1	1
Fencing	0	0	1	1
Karate	0	4	17	21
Karate-Do	0	1	2	3
Lawn Bowls	2	9	2	13
Netball	0	0	3	3
Polo	1	0	2	3
Pencak Silat	2	3	16	21
Sepak takraw	0	0	8	8
Shorinji Kempo	0	2	0	2
Taekwondo	0	0	3	3
Wushu	2	6	7	15
Total	7	25	63	95

== See also ==
- Brunei at the Asian Games
