= Pencak silat at the 2005 SEA Games =

Pencak Silat at the 2005 SEA Games
- Venue: Cebu Coliseum
- Location: Cebu City
- Date: November 30 – December 4

Pencak Silat at the 2005 SEA Games took place in the Cebu Coliseum, Cebu City, Philippines.

The event was held from November 30 to December 4.

== Medal table ==
* Host nation (Philippines)

Rank	Nation	Gold	Silver	Bronze	Total
1	Vietnam	7	3	2	12
2	Indonesia	5	4	2	11
3	Malaysia	3	2	7	12
4	Singapore	1	3	7	11
5	Philippines*	1	2	5	8
6	Thailand	0	2	5	7
7	Myanmar	0	1	2	3
Totals (7 entries)		17	17	30	64

== Medalists ==
=== Art ===
Event	Gold	Silver	Bronze
Men's singles	Eko Wahyudi; Indonesia	Nguyễn Việt Anh; Vietnam	Habizan Othman; Malaysia
Women's singles	Suzy Sulaiman; Malaysia	Tuti Winarni; Indonesia	Norisha Anwar; Singapore
Men's team	Indonesia; Achmad Rizanul Wahyudi; Agus Lamun; Nuryudha Bijak Imansyah	Vietnam; Lê Quang Dũng; Nguyễn Đăng Linh; Nguyễn Huy Bảo	Malaysia; Hafiz Abu Hasan; Marzuki Moktar; Mohd Fauzi Latif
Women's team	Indonesia; Mila Lusiana; Pudji Dwiriyanti; Suryani	Singapore; Fatma Abdul Halid; Nordianawati Sadali; Raden Mas Ayu Ali	Philippines; Ameraida Asmad; Carla Arang; Donabel Galera

=== Combat ===
==== Men ====
Event	Gold	Silver	Bronze
Class A 45−50 kg	Abang Erdie Abang Pauzan; Malaysia	Dian Kristanto; Indonesia	Jul Omar Abdulhakim; Philippines
Class A 45−50 kg	Abang Erdie Abang Pauzan; Malaysia	Dian Kristanto; Indonesia	Mohd Asadullah; Singapore
Class B 50−55 kg	Trần Văn Toàn; Vietnam	Christopher Yabut; Philippines	Tin Oo; Myanmar
Class B 50−55 kg	Trần Văn Toàn; Vietnam	Christopher Yabut; Philippines	Yutano Bairaman; Thailand
Class C 55−60 kg	Nguyễn Bá Trình; Vietnam	Nakin Kumsree; Thailand	Adzhar Abdurazad; Philippines
Class C 55−60 kg	Nguyễn Bá Trình; Vietnam	Nakin Kumsree; Thailand	Amir Ikram Rahim; Malaysia
Class D 60−65 kg	Ahmad Sharil Zailudin; Malaysia	Abdulloh Mahlee; Thailand	Abdul Raimi; Singapore
Class D 60−65 kg	Ahmad Sharil Zailudin; Malaysia	Abdulloh Mahlee; Thailand	Yohanes Edison Buru; Indonesia
Class E 65−70 kg	Haris Nugroho; Indonesia	Norhasmizan Abdullah; Malaysia	Thin Lin Aung; Myanmar
Class E 65−70 kg	Haris Nugroho; Indonesia	Norhasmizan Abdullah; Malaysia	Lê Anh Tuấn; Vietnam
Class F 70−75 kg	Marniel Dimla; Philippines	Đinh Công Sơn; Vietnam	Iswandy Safie; Singapore
Class F 70−75 kg	Marniel Dimla; Philippines	Đinh Công Sơn; Vietnam	Pojanan Satha; Thailand
Class G 75−80 kg	Rony Syaifullah; Indonesia	Abdul Kadir Mohd Ibrahim; Singapore	Nirun Markpech; Thailand
Class G 75−80 kg	Rony Syaifullah; Indonesia	Abdul Kadir Mohd Ibrahim; Singapore	Mohd Zuber Ismail; Malaysia
Class H 80−85 kg	Muhammad Imran Abdul Rahman; Singapore	Andy Zulkarnaen; Indonesia	? Malaysia
Class H 80−85 kg	Muhammad Imran Abdul Rahman; Singapore	Andy Zulkarnaen; Indonesia	? Vietnam
Class I 85−90 kg	Nguyễn Văn Hùng; Vietnam	Mohd Yusof Shan Kamarudin; Singapore	Niwat Phuangphaka; Thailand
Class I 85−90 kg	Nguyễn Văn Hùng; Vietnam	Mohd Yusof Shan Kamarudin; Singapore	Herihono; Indonesia

==== Women ====
Event	Gold	Silver	Bronze
Class A 45−50 kg	Lê Thị Hằng; Vietnam	Nyien Nyien Aung; Myanmar	Nur As'Shiken Amran; Singapore
Class A 45−50 kg	Lê Thị Hằng; Vietnam	Nyien Nyien Aung; Myanmar	Nerlyn Huinda; Philippines
Class B 50−55 kg	Huỳnh Thị Thu Hồng; Vietnam	Annaliza Bea; Philippines	Sitti Gameela Japilus; Malaysia
Class B 50−55 kg	Huỳnh Thị Thu Hồng; Vietnam	Annaliza Bea; Philippines	Saida Said; Singapore
Class C 55−60 kg	Trịnh Thị Ngà; Vietnam	Rosmiati; Indonesia	Juvy Jumuad; Philippines
Class C 55−60 kg	Trịnh Thị Ngà; Vietnam	Rosmiati; Indonesia	Malini Mohamad; Malaysia
Class D 60−65 kg	Nguyễn Thị Phương Thúy; Vietnam	Emy Latif; Malaysia	Zuhrah Sabri; Singapore
Class D 60−65 kg	Nguyễn Thị Phương Thúy; Vietnam	Emy Latif; Malaysia	Mayura Kamchote; Thailand
