= Gymnastics at the 2005 SEA Games =

- Venue: Rizal Memorial Coliseum
- Location: RMSC, Malate, Manila
- Date: November 29 – December 5

Gymnastics at the 2005 SEA Games was divided into three sub-categories: artistic gymnastics, rhythmic gymnastics, and aerobics. The artistic gymnastics was held from November 29 to December 1, the rhythmic gymnastics from December 2 to December 3, and the aerobics from December 4 to December 5. All events were held at the Rizal Memorial Stadium at the Rizal Memorial Sports Complex, in Malate, Manila, Philippines.

== Medal table ==
* Host nation (Philippines)

| Rank | Nation | Gold | Silver | Bronze | Total |
|---|---|---|---|---|---|
| 1 | Malaysia (MAS) | 10 | 8 | 4 | 22 |
| 2 | Thailand (THA) | 7 | 2 | 5 | 14 |
| 3 | Vietnam (VIE) | 5 | 4 | 9 | 18 |
| 4 | Indonesia (INA) | 2 | 5 | 4 | 11 |
| 5 | Singapore (SIN) | 2 | 2 | 0 | 4 |
| 6 | Philippines (PHI)* | 2 | 1 | 7 | 10 |
| Totals (6 entries) | | 28 | 22 | 29 | 79 |

== Medalists ==
=== Artistic ===

Men

| Event | Gold | Silver | Bronze |
|---|---|---|---|
| Team all-around | Malaysia; Mohd Azzam Azmi; Yap Kiam Bun; Ng Shu Mun; Ng Shu Wai; Ooi Wei Siang; Wan Foong Lum | Thailand; Apichart Charoenrattanakul; Aekaraj Chankroong; Kittipong Yudee; Natthaphong Changphrak; Rartchawat Kaewpanya; Thitipong Sukdee | Philippines; Al Ramirez; Brydon Sy; Neil Faustino; Roel Ramirez; Ronnie Ramirez |
| Team all-around | Malaysia; Mohd Azzam Azmi; Yap Kiam Bun; Ng Shu Mun; Ng Shu Wai; Ooi Wei Siang; Wan Foong Lum | Thailand; Apichart Charoenrattanakul; Aekaraj Chankroong; Kittipong Yudee; Natthaphong Changphrak; Rartchawat Kaewpanya; Thitipong Sukdee | Vietnam; Trương Minh Sang; Hầu Trung Linh; Hoàng Cường; Nguyễn Hà Thanh; Nguyễn Minh Tuấn; Phạm Phước Hưng |
| Individual all-around | Ng Shu Wai; Malaysia | Ooi Wei Siang; Malaysia | Roel Ramirez; Philippines |
| Floor | Roel Ramirez; Philippines | not awarded | not awarded |
| Floor | Ng Shu Wai; Malaysia | not awarded | not awarded |
| Floor | Mohammad Aldilla Akbar; Indonesia | not awarded | not awarded |
| Horizontal bar | Ng Shu Wai; Malaysia | Roel Ramirez; Philippines | Ooi Wei Siang; Malaysia |
| Parallel bars | Phạm Phước Hưng; Vietnam | Nguyễn Hà Thanh; Vietnam | Brydon Sy; Philippines |
| Pommel horse | Trương Minh Sang; Vietnam | Yap Kiam Bun; Malaysia | Thitipong Sukdee; Thailand |
| Rings | Thitipong Sukdee; Thailand | not awarded | Aekaraj Chankroong; Thailand |
| Rings | Nguyễn Minh Tuấn; Vietnam | not awarded | Aekaraj Chankroong; Thailand |
| Vault | Roel Ramirez; Philippines | Ng Shu Wai; Malaysia | not awarded |
| Vault | Roel Ramirez; Philippines | Mohammad Aldilla Akbar; Indonesia | not awarded |

Women

| Event | Gold | Silver | Bronze |
|---|---|---|---|
| Team all-around | Singapore; Lee Wen Ling; Nicole Tay Xi Hui; Lee Wen Si; Lim Heem Wei; Tabitha Tay Jia Hui; Nur Atikah Nabilah | Vietnam; Đặng Thị Thu Thủy; Dương Minh Hằng; Trần Thị Phương Thảo; Nguyễn Thùy Dương; Đỗ Thị Ngân Thương; Phan Thị Hà Thanh | Malaysia; Kai Ling Tan; Tracie Ang; Nurul Fatiha Abd Hamid; Nabihah Ali; Sau Wah Chan |
| Individual all-around | Đỗ Thị Ngân Thương; Vietnam | Nguyễn Thùy Dương; Vietnam | Dewi Prahara; Indonesia |
| Balance beam | Đỗ Thị Ngân Thương; Vietnam | Tabitha Tay Jia Hui; Singapore | Phan Thị Hà Thanh; Vietnam |
| Floor | Nicole Tay Xi Hui; Singapore | Nurul Fatiha Abd Hamid; Malaysia | Phan Thị Hà Thanh; Vietnam |
| Uneven bars | Nurul Fatiha Abd Hamid; Malaysia | Nicole Tay Xi Hui; Singapore | Nguyễn Thùy Dương; Vietnam |
| Vault | Adelina Riri Wulandari; Indonesia | Dewi Prahara; Indonesia | Kaissa Saguisag; Philippines |

=== Rhythmic ===

Women

| Event | Gold | Silver | Bronze |
|---|---|---|---|
| Team all-around | Malaysia; Foong Seow Ting; Durratun Nashihin Rosli; Wen Chean Lim; See Hui Yee | Thailand; Tharatip Sridee; Ploychompoo Payonrat; Thanattra Limpasin; Surutchana Parapho | Vietnam; Lưu Hoài Thu; Nguyễn Thu Hà; Trần Thị Minh Thu |
| Team all-around | Malaysia; Foong Seow Ting; Durratun Nashihin Rosli; Wen Chean Lim; See Hui Yee | Thailand; Tharatip Sridee; Ploychompoo Payonrat; Thanattra Limpasin; Surutchana Parapho | Indonesia; Putri Sari Fatimah; Cici Mitasari; Nathalia Winindo; Windy Yofilia |
| Individual all-around | Foong Seow Ting; Malaysia | Wen Chean Lim; Malaysia | Lưu Hoài Thu; Vietnam |
| Ball | Tharatip Sridee; Thailand | Foong Seow Ting; Malaysia | See Hui Yee; Malaysia |
| Ball | Tharatip Sridee; Thailand | Foong Seow Ting; Malaysia | Nathalia Winindo; Indonesia |
| Ball | Tharatip Sridee; Thailand | Foong Seow Ting; Malaysia | Trần Thị Minh Thu; Vietnam |
| Clubs | Foong Seow Ting; Malaysia | Durratun Nashihin Rosli; Malaysia | Danica Calapatan; Philippines |
| Clubs | Foong Seow Ting; Malaysia | Durratun Nashihin Rosli; Malaysia | Tharatip Sridee; Thailand |
| Ribbon | Foong Seow Ting; Malaysia | not awarded | Thanattra Limpasin; Thailand |
| Ribbon | Tharatip Sridee; Thailand | not awarded | Durratun Nashihin Rosli; Malaysia |
| Rope | See Hui Yee; Malaysia | Foong Seow Ting; Malaysia | Tharatip Sridee; Thailand |
| Rope | See Hui Yee; Malaysia | Foong Seow Ting; Malaysia | Danica Calapatan; Philippines |

=== Aerobic ===

| Event | Gold | Silver | Bronze |
|---|---|---|---|
| Men's individual | Nattawut Pimpa; Thailand | Lody Lontoh; Indonesia | Brian Peralta; Philippines |
| Women's individual | Roypim Ngampeerapong; Thailand | Tyana Dewi Koesumawati; Indonesia | Nguyễn Thị Thanh Hiền; Vietnam |
| Mixed pair | Thailand; Nattawut Pimpa; Suwadee Phrutichai | Vietnam; Nguyễn Tấn Thành; Nguyễn Thị Thanh Hiền | Indonesia; Yuanita Mailusia; Sugianto |
| Men's trios | Thailand; Kittipong Tawinun; Phairach Thotkhamchai; Chanchalak Yiammit | Indonesia; Lody Lontoh; Faizal Amirullah; Fahmy Fachrezzy | Vietnam; Nguyễn Thanh Huy; Nguyễn Tấn Thành; Thai Anh Tuan |
