= Canoeing at the 2005 SEA Games =

Event of Canoeing & Kayaking held at Philippines during 2005 southeast Asian Games

Canoe and Kayak at the 2005 SEA Games
- Venue: Malawaan Fishing Area
- Location: Subic Bay Freeport Zone, Olongapo City, Zambales
- Date: December 2–4

Canoeing and Kayaking at the 2005 SEA Games was held at the Malawaan Fishing Area of the Subic Bay Freeport Zone in Zambales, Philippines.

The participants competed for 7 gold medals.

== Medal table ==
* Host nation (Philippines)

Rank	Nation	Gold	Silver	Bronze	Total
1	Indonesia	4	3	0	7
2	Myanmar	2	2	1	5
3	Vietnam	1	1	3	5
4	Philippines*	0	1	2	3
5	Thailand	0	0	1	1
Totals (5 entries)		7	7	7	21

== Medalists ==
=== Men ===
Event	Gold	Silver	Bronze
C-1 500 m	Nguyễn Đức Cảnh; Vietnam	Yuyu Fernando; Indonesia	Norwell Cajes; Philippines
C-2 500 m	Indonesia; Asnawir; Roinadi	Philippines; Jeremiah Tambor; John Oliver Victorio	Myanmar; Aung Lin; Win Htike
K-1 500 m	Myint Tayzar Phone; Myanmar	Sayadin; Indonesia	Marvin Amposta; Philippines
K-2 500 m	Indonesia; Silo; Laode Hadi	Vietnam; Trần Hữu Trí; Nguyễn Khánh Thành	Thailand; Piyaphan Phaophat; Anusorn Sommit

=== Women ===
Event	Gold	Silver	Bronze
K-1 500 m	Sarce Aronggear; Indonesia	Naw Ahle Lashe; Myanmar	Đoàn Thị Cách; Vietnam
K-2 500 m	Indonesia; Sarce Aronggear; Rasima	Myanmar; Krin Mar Oo; Aye Mi Khaing	Vietnam; Nguyễn Thị Loan; Nguyễn Thị Hoa
K-4 500 m	Myanmar; Thei Htay Win; Khin Mar Oo; Aye Mi Khaing; Naw Ahle Lashe	Indonesia; Sarce Aronggear; Rasima; Yohana Yoce Yom; Royadin Rais	Vietnam; Đoàn Thị Cách; Bùi Thị Phương; Nguyễn Thị Loan; Nguyễn Thị Hoa
