= Sharon Wee =

Malaysian squash player (born 1977)

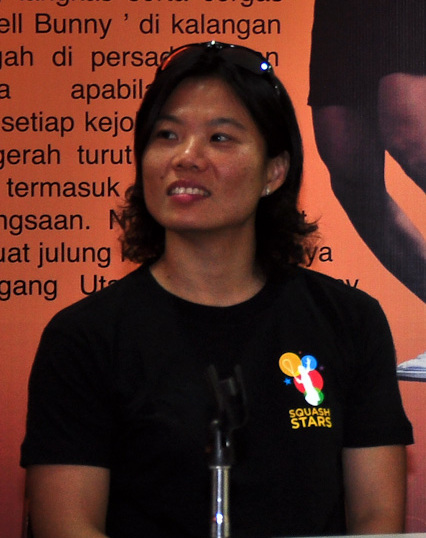
- Sharon Wee during the Squash Stars Meet the Stars session in 2010

Personal information
- Full name: Sharon Wee Ee Lin
- Born: 5 October 1977 (age 48) Melaka, Malaysia

Sport
- Country: Malaysia
- Handedness: Right Handed
- Turned pro: 1997
- Coached by: Shaun Moxham
- Retired: 2012
- Racquet used: Dunlop

Women's singles
- Highest ranking: No. 18 (December 2006)
Medal record
Women's squash
Representing Malaysia
World Team Championships
Bronze medal – third place	2006 Edmonton	Team
Bronze medal – third place	2008 Cairo	Team
Bronze medal – third place	2010 Palmerston	Team
Asian Games
Gold medal – first place	2010 Guangzhou	Team
Southeast Asian Games
Gold medal – first place	2005 Manila	Singles
- Updated on 15 January 2018

Sharon Wee Ee Lin (born 5 October 1977 in Melaka) is a former professional squash player who represented Malaysia.

== Career ==
During 2007, she reached the finals of four events and won her first WISPA title in November in the NSC Tour 10 No. 2 in Kuala Lumpur. She reached a career-high world ranking of World No. 18 in December 2006. She retired as a professional player in 2012.

In 2010, she was part of the team that won a third consecutive bronze medal for Malaysia at the 2010 Women's World Team Squash Championships.

== Personal life ==
Sharon is a Peranakan descendant. She is now doing her part to promote squash. She has set up an academy – Sharon Wee Squash Pro-in Kuala Lumpur to work closely with university students and young players.

Sharon is currently a TV presenter and sports commentator on Astro Arena, the Malaysian sports channel.

== Awards ==
- Melaka Sportswomen of The Year 1994, 1995 & 1999
- National Sports Awards Best Women's Team 1995, 2000 & 2008
