= Safuan Said =

Malaysian international Lawn bowler (born 1982)

Personal information
- Nationality: Malaysian
- Born: 3 August 1982 (age 43)
Medal record
Representing Malaysia
World Outdoor Championships
Gold medal – first place	2008 Christchurch	Men's singles
Bronze medal – third place	2008 Christchurch	Men's pairs
Bronze medal – third place	2008 Christchurch	Men's team
World Cup Singles
Silver medal – second place	2006 Warilla	singles
Gold medal – first place	2008 Warilla	singles
Silver medal – second place	2009 Warilla	singles
Asia Pacific Bowls Championships
Gold medal – first place	2005 Melbourne	pairs
Bronze medal – third place	2007 Christchurch	singles
Bronze medal – third place	2009 Kuala Lumpur	singles
Bronze medal – third place	2009 Kuala Lumpur	pairs
Gold medal – first place	2011 Adelaide	singles
Southeast Asian Games
Gold medal – first place	2005 Angeles City	pairs
Asian Lawn Bowls Championship
Gold medal – first place	2003 Kuala Lumpur	pairs
Gold medal – first place	2005 Kuala Lumpur	pairs
Gold medal – first place	2005 Kuala Lumpur	fours

Safuan Said (born 1982) is a Malaysian international Lawn bowler.

== Bowls career ==
He won the lawn bowls gold medal in the singles competition at the 2008 World Outdoor Bowls Championship in Christchurch, New Zealand and a bronze medal in the pairs with Fairul Izwan Abd Muin.

He has also won five medals at the Asia Pacific Bowls Championships including two singles gold medals in 2005 and 2011 and a gold medal in the pairs event at the 2005 Southeast Asian Games in Angeles City.

Indoors, he won the 2005 World Junior Cup and also won the gold medal at the 2008 World Cup Singles in Warilla, New South Wales, Australia.
