= Nor Iryani Azmi =

Malaysian lawn bowler

Personal information
- Nationality: Malaysian
- Born: 8 April 1986 (age 40)
Medal record
Representing Malaysia
Commonwealth Games
Gold medal – first place	2006 Melbourne	triples
World Singles Champion of Champions
Gold medal – first place	2005 Christchurch	Women's event
Asia Pacific Bowls Championships
Silver medal – second place	2005 Melbourne	triples
Southeast Asian Games
Gold medal – first place	2005 Angeles City	triples
Asian Lawn Bowls Championship
Gold medal – first place	2005 Kuala Lumpur	fours
Gold medal – first place	2006 Brunei	fours

Nor Iryani Azmi (born 8 April 1986) is an international Malaysian lawn bowler.

== Bowls career ==
In 2004, she made her international debut and then in 2005 became the first Malaysian woman to win the World Singles Champion of Champions title.

She won the triples silver medal at the 2005 Asia Pacific Bowls Championships in Melbourne and also in 2005, she won the gold medal in the triples event at the 2005 Southeast Asian Games in Angeles City.

She won a gold medal in the women's triples with Nor Hashimah Ismail and Azlina Arshad at the 2006 Commonwealth Games in Melbourne.

From 2007 to 2010 she did not compete whilst she studied but returned for the 2010 Commonwealth Games.
