= Brunei at the 2005 SEA Games =

Brunei at the 2005 Southeast Asian Games
- IOC code: BRU
- NOC: Brunei Darussalam National Olympic Council
- Website: www.bruneiolympic.org (in English)

in the Manila
- Competitors: 109
- Flag bearer: Yunus Hamid
- Medals Ranked 9th: Gold 1 Silver 3 Bronze 2 Total 6

Southeast Asian Games appearances (overview)
- 1977; 1979; 1981; 1983; 1985; 1987; 1989; 1991; 1993; 1995; 1997; 1999; 2001; 2003; 2005; 2007; 2009; 2011; 2013; 2015; 2017; 2019; 2021; 2023; 2025; 2027; 2029

Brunei Darussalam participated in the 2005 Southeast Asian Games held in multiple venues in the Philippines from November 27, 2005 to December 5, 2005. The chief of mission to the games was Japar Bangkol. It won 1 gold, 3 silver and 2 bronze medals at the games.

== Medalists ==
| Medal | Name | Sport | Event |
|---|---|---|---|
| Gold | PG Moh Salfh Chuchu PG HJ Tuah; Haji Naim Brahim; Lokman Mohammad Salleh | Lawn bowls | Men's triples |
| Silver | Haji Tengah Masdiana | Karate | Men's individual kumite (< 55 kg.) |
| Silver | Sim Chung Hlang | Karate | Men's individual kumite (< 70 kg.) |
| Bronze | Tong Kit Siong | Karate | Men's individual kumite (< 75 kg.) |
