= Pétanque at the 2005 SEA Games =

- Venue: Hidden Vale Sports Club
- Location: Clark Special Economic Zone, Angeles City
- Start date: December 1, 2005
- End date: December 4, 2005

Pétanque at the 2005 Southeast Asian Games logo

Pétanque at the 2005 SEA Games took place in the Hidden Vale Sports Club in Angeles City, Philippines.

The event was held from December 1–4.

Pétanque is a form of boules where the goal is to throw metal balls as close as possible to a jack (a small wooden ball called a cochonnet in French, which means piglet). The game is normally played on hard sand or gravel, but can also be played on grass or any other surface. Similar games are bocce and bowls.

== Medal winners ==
Event		Gold	Silver	Bronze
MEN	Single	Laos	Malaysia	Thailand Vietnam
MEN	Double	Thailand	Laos	Vietnam Malaysia
MEN	Triple	LaosPhoneopaseuth Soukkhapone - Saysamone Sengdao - Phonexay Douangmisy - Ounkeo Lienkeo	CambodiaOr Chandaren - Yin Sophorn - Khen Sopheak - Chhoeup Setha	ThailandThaleungkiat Phusa-ad - Pakin Phukram - Virapong Wanta - Siripong Ratana VietnamDanh Sa Phanl - Thach Huutan - Thach Duong - Nguyen Heiu Phuc
WOMEN	Singles	Thailand	Cambodia	Philippines Singapore
WOMEN	Double	Thailand	Cambodia	Vietnam Singapore
WOMEN	Triple	Thailand	Vietnam	Cambodia Malaysia

== Petanque Medals Ranking by country at 2005 SEA Games ==
Rank	Country	Gold	Silver	Bronze	Total
Rank	Country	^{6}	^{6}	^{12}	^{44}
1	Thailand	4	0	2	6
4	Laos	2	1	-	3
3	Cambodia	-	3	1	4
2	Vietnam	-	1	4	5
5	Malaysia	-	1	2	3
6	Singapore	-	-	2	2
7	Philippines	-	-	1	1
