= Indonesia at the 2005 SEA Games =

Indonesia at the 2005 Southeast Asian Games
- IOC code: INA
- NOC: Indonesian Olympic Committee
- Website: www.nocindonesia.or.id (in English)

in the Manila 27 November - 5 December 2005
- Competitors: 633
- Flag bearer: Hendrawan (badminton)
- Medals Ranked 5th: Gold 50 Silver 78 Bronze 89 Total 217

Southeast Asian Games appearances (overview)
- 1977; 1979; 1981; 1983; 1985; 1987; 1989; 1991; 1993; 1995; 1997; 1999; 2001; 2003; 2005; 2007; 2009; 2011; 2013; 2015; 2017; 2019; 2021; 2023; 2025; 2027; 2029

Indonesia participated in the 2005 Southeast Asian Games held in multiple venues in the Philippines from November 27, 2005 to December 5, 2005. The chief of mission to the games was Joko Pramono.

== Medalists ==
Medal	Name	Sport	Event
Gold	Sony Dwi Kuncoro	Badminton	Men's singles
Gold	Adriyanti Firdasari	Badminton	Women's singles
Gold	Markis Kido; Hendra Setiawan	Badminton	Men's doubles
Gold	Nova Widianto; Liliyana Natsir	Badminton	Mixed doubles
Gold	Silo; Laode Hadi	Canoeing	Men's K-2 500 m
Gold	Sarce Aronggear	Canoeing	Women's K-1 500 m
Gold	Sarce Aronggear; Rasima	Canoeing	Women's K-2 500 m
Gold	Mohammad Aldilla Akbar	Gymnastics	Men's floor
Gold	Adelina Riri Wulandari	Gymnastics	Women's vault
Gold	Peter Taslim	Judo	Men's 66 kg
Gold	Endang Sri Lestari Nugrohowati	Judo	Women's 57 kg
Gold	Eko Wahyudi	Pencak silat	Men's singles
Gold	Mila Lusiana Pudji Dwiriyanti; Suryani	Pencak silat	Women's team
Gold	Haris Nugroho	Pencak silat	Men's combat class E 65–70 kg
Gold	Rony Syaifullah	Pencak silat	Men's combat class G 75–80 kg
Gold	Richard Sam Bera	Swimming	Men's 100 m freestyle
Gold	Donny Utomo	Swimming	Men's 200 m butterfly
Gold	Felix Sutanto; Albert Sutanto; Herry Yudhianto; Richard Sam Bera	Swimming	Men's 4x100 m medley relay
Gold	Juana Wangsa Putri	Taekwondo	Women's bantamweight 55 kg
Gold	Wynne Prakusya	Tennis	Women's singles
Gold	Wynne Prakusya; Romana Tedjakusuma	Tennis	Women's doubles
Gold	Wynne Prakusya; Romana Tedjakusuma; Ayu Fani Damayanti; Septi Mende	Tennis	Women's team

== See also ==
- 2005 Southeast Asian Games
- Indonesia
