= Philippines at the 2005 SEA Games =

Philippines at the 2005 Southeast Asian Games
- IOC code: PHI
- NOC: Philippine Olympic Committee
- Website: www.olympic.ph (in English)

in the Manila
- Competitors: 892
- Flag bearer: Mikee Cojuangco-Jaworski
- Officials: 308
- Medals Ranked 1st: Gold 112 Silver 84 Bronze 94 Total 290

Southeast Asian Games appearances (overview)
- 1977; 1979; 1981; 1983; 1985; 1987; 1989; 1991; 1993; 1995; 1997; 1999; 2001; 2003; 2005; 2007; 2009; 2011; 2013; 2015; 2017; 2019; 2021; 2023; 2025; 2027; 2029

The Philippines hosted the 23rd Southeast Asian Games in 2005, marking the third time the biennial event was held in the country. Filipino athletes achieved significant success, initially securing 113 gold medals, leading to their position as overall champions in the medal tally, surpassing Thailand by 26 golds. However, this count was later revised to 112 gold medals following the disqualification of a Taekwondo gold medalist.

A delegation of 892 athletes represented the Philippines, supported by 308 officials. The team's chief of mission for the games was Jose Miguel Arroyo. During the opening ceremony, the Philippine delegation included notable figures such as Miss International 2005 Precious Lara Quigaman, WBC Lightweight Champion Manny Pacquiao, and actress Angel Locsin.

== Sports and athlete development ==
Most of the athletes were sent to China for a five-month training process. Innovations in terms of the acquisition of new facilities and proper budget allocation were the main concerns of the Philippine Sports Commission in cooperation with the Philippine Olympic Committee (POC).

The POC awarded all medalists cash incentives.

== Medalists ==
=== Gold ===
No.	Medal	Name	Sport	Event
1	Gold	Mark Javier; Christian Cubilla; Florante Matan	Archery	Men's team recurve
2	Gold	Amaya Paz	Archery	Women's individual compound
3	Gold	Abigail Tindugan; Amaya Paz; Jennifer Chan	Archery	Women's team compound
4	Gold	Peter Kevin Celis; Glenn Llamador; Nathan Ben Dominguez	Arnis	Men's Synchronized Anyo Forms
5	Gold	Rochelle Quirol; Catherine Ballenas; Aireen Parong	Arnis	Women's Synchronized Anyo Forms
6	Gold	Anna Joy Fernandez	Arnis	Women's sparring 52kg Full Contact
7	Gold	Jimar Aing	Athletics	Men's 400m
8	Gold	Rene Herrera	Athletics	Men's 3000m Steeplechase
9	Gold	Kashus Perona; Jimar Aing; Julius Nieras; Ernie Candelario	Athletics	Men's 4 × 400 m Relay
10	Gold	Henry Dagmil	Athletics	Men's long jump
11	Gold	Arniel Ferrera	Athletics	Men's hammer throw
12	Gold	Danilo Fresnido	Athletics	Men's javelin throw
13	Gold	Mercedita Manipol	Athletics	Women's 10000m
14	Gold	Christabel Martes	Athletics	Women's Marathon
15	Gold	Marestella Torres	Athletics	Women's long jump
16	Gold	Philippines	Baseball	Men's team
17	Gold	Alex Pagulayan	Billiards	Men's 8-Ball Pool Singles
18	Gold	Lee Vann Corteza; Antonio Gabica	Billiards	Men's 8-Ball Pool Doubles
19	Gold	Alex Pagulayan; Dennis Orcollo	Billiards	Men's 9-Ball Pool Doubles
20	Gold	Ronato Alcano	Billiards	Men's 15-Ball Pool Singles
21	Gold	Ronato Alcano; Leonardo Andam	Billiards	Men's 15-Ball Pool Doubles
22	Gold	Rubilen Amit	Billiards	Women's 8-Ball Pool Singles
23	Gold	Rubilen Amit	Billiards	Women's 9-Ball Pool Singles
24	Gold	Alex Pagulayan; Joven Alba; Leonardo Andam	Billiards	Men's Snooker Team
25	Gold	Michael Borenaga	Bodybuilding	Men's Bantamweight 65kg
26	Gold	Alfredo Trazona	Bodybuilding	Men's welterweight 75kg
27	Gold	Christian Jan Suarez; Ernesto Gatchalian Jr.	Bowling	Men's doubles
28	Gold	Markwin Tee	Bowling	Men's masters
29	Gold	Maria Cecilia Yap	Bowling	Women's singles
30	Gold	Liza Clutario	Bowling	Women's masters
31	Gold	Juanito Magliquian Jr.	Boxing	Men's Pinweight 45kg
32	Gold	Harry Tañamor	Boxing	Men's light flyweight 48kg
33	Gold	Joan Tipon	Boxing	Men's Bantamweight 54kg
34	Gold	Genebert Basadre	Boxing	Men's Lightweight 60kg
35	Gold	Alice Aparri	Boxing	Women's Pinweight 46kg
36	Gold	Annie Albania	Boxing	Women's Flyweight 50kg
37	Gold	Jouvilet Chilem	Boxing	Women's Bantamweight 54kg
38	Gold	Mitchel Martinez	Boxing	Women's Lightweight 60kg
39	Gold	Alfie Catalan	Cycling	Men's 4km Track Racing Individual Pursuit
40	Gold	Baby Marites Bitbit	Cycling	Women's cross country MTB
41	Gold	Rico Rosima; Filomena Salvador	Dancesport	Standard
42	Gold	Michael Mendoza; Belinda Adora	Dancesport	Latin
43	Gold	Zardo Domenios; Niño Carog	Diving	Men's Synchronized 3m springboard
44	Gold	Rexel Ryan Fabriga; Kevin Kromwel Kong	Diving	Men's synchronized 10m platform
45	Gold	Sheila Mae Perez	Diving	Women's 1m springboard
46	Gold	Sheila Mae Perez	Diving	Women's 3m springboard
47	Gold	Sheila Mae Perez; Ceseil Domenios	Diving	Women's Synchronized 3m springboard
48	Gold	Joker Arroyo; Mikee Conjuangco-Jaworski; Juan Ramon Lanza; Toni Leviste	Equestrian	Team Jumping
49	Gold	Walbert Mendoza	Fencing	Men's individual Sabre
50	Gold	Rolando Canlas; Emerson Segui; Ramil Endriano; Mark Denver Atienza	Fencing	Men's team Foil
51	Gold	Richard Gomez; Avelino Victorino Jr. Wilfredo Vizcayno; Armando Bernal	Fencing	Men's team Épée
52	Gold	Veena Tessa Nuestro	Fencing	Women's individual Foil
53	Gold	Melly Joyce Angeles	Fencing	Women's individual Épée
54	Gold	Juvic Pagunsan	Golf	Men's individual
55	Gold	Juvic Pagunsan; Jay Baron; Michael Eric Bibat; Marvin Dumandan	Golf	Men's team
56	Gold	Roel Ramirez	Gymnastics	Men's floor Exercis
57	Gold	Roel Ramirez	Gymnastics	Men's vault
58	Gold	Gilbert Ramirez	Judo	Men's 73kg
59	Gold	John Baylon	Judo	Men's 81kg
60	Gold	Helen Dawa	Judo	Women's 45kg
61	Gold	Karen Solomon	Judo	Women's 70kg
62	Gold	Nelson Pacalso	Karate	Men's kumite 65kg
63	Gold	Maria Marna Pabillore	Karate	Women's kumite 53kg
64	Gold	Gretchen Malalad	Karate	Women's kumite +60kg
65	Gold	Ronald Lising	Lawn bowls	Men's singles
66	Gold	Claire Cadampong; Lianne Flameno	Muay Thai	Women's Waikru 51-54kg
67	Gold	Victoria Agbayani; Cristina Custodio	Muay Thai	Women's Waikru 57-54kg
68	Gold	Roland Claro	Muay Thai	Men's light flyweight Combat 45-48kg
69	Gold	Marniel Dimia	Pencak Silat	Women's Combat Class F 70-75kg
70	Gold	Benjamin Tolentino Jr. Jose Rodriguez	Rowing	Men's Coxless Pair
71	Gold	Benjamin Tolentino Jr.	Rowing	Men's Lightweight Single Sculls
72	Gold	Benjamin Tolentino Jr. Alvin Amposta	Rowing	Men's lightweight double sculls
73	Gold	German Paz	Sailing	Men's RS: X
74	Gold	Paul Brian Rosario	Shooting	Men's skeet
75	Gold	Paul Brian Rosario; Darius Alexis Hizon; Nonoy Bernardo	Shooting	Men's skeet team
76	Gold	Juanito Angeles	Shooting	Men's Practical Shotgun Events
77	Gold	Philippines	Softball	Men's team
78	Gold	Philippines	Softball	Women's team
79	Gold	Miguel Mendoza	Swimming	Men's 1500m freestyle
80	Gold	Miguel Molina	Swimming	Men's 200m breaststroke
81	Gold	Miguel Molina	Swimming	Men's 200m individual medley
82	Gold	Miguel Molina	Swimming	Men's 400m individual medley
83	Gold	John Paul Lizardo	Taekwondo	Men's finweight 54kg
84	Gold	Tshomlee Go	Taekwondo	Men's Bantamweight 62kg
85	Gold	Donald Geisler	Taekwondo	Men's Lightweight 72kg
86	Gold	Kirstie Alora	Taekwondo	Women's Featherweight 59kg
87	Gold	Toni Rivero	Taekwondo	Women's Lightweight 63kg
88	Gold	Cecil Mamiit	Tennis	Men's singles
89	Gold	Cecil Mamiit; Eric Taino; Johnny Arcilla; Patrick John Tierro	Tennis	Men's team
90	Gold	Cecil Mamiit; Riza Zalameda	Tennis	Mixed doubles
91	Gold	Philippines	Traditional Boat Race	Men's 500m 10A-Side
92	Gold	Philippines	Traditional Boat Race	Men's 1000m 10A-Side
93	Gold	Philippines	Traditional Boat Race	Men's 500m 20A-Side
94	Gold	Philippines	Traditional Boat Race	Men's 1000m 20A-Side
95	Gold	Philippines	Traditional Boat Race	Women's 500m 10A-Side
96	Gold	Philippines	Traditional Boat Race	Women's 1000m 10A-Side
97	Gold	Jimmy Angana	Wrestling	Men's 60-66kg
98	Gold	Marcus Valda	Wrestling	Men's 84-96kg
99	Gold	Francis Villanueva	Wrestling	Men's 96-120kg
100	Gold	Cristina Villanueva	Wrestling	Women's 48-51kg
101	Gold	Gemma Silverio	Wrestling	Women's 55-59kg
102	Gold	Arvin Ting	Wushu	Men's taolu Daoshu
103	Gold	Willy Wang	Wushu	Men's taolu Jianshu
104	Gold	Pedro Quina	Wushu	Men's taolu Nanquan
105	Gold	Willy Wang	Wushu	Men's taolu qiangshu
106	Gold	Lester Pimentel; Richard Ng	Wushu	Men's taolu duilian
107	Gold	Rene Catalan	Wushu	Men's sanda 48kg
108	Gold	Eduard Folayang	Wushu	Men's sanda 70kg
109	Gold	Aida Yang	Wushu	Women's taolu Daoshu
110	Gold	Vicky Ting	Wushu	Women's taolu Jianshu
111	Gold	Vicky Ting; Aida Yang	Wushu	Women's taolu duilian
112	Gold	Rhea May Rifani	Wushu	Women's sanda 52kg

=== Silver ===
No.	Medal	Name	Sport	Event
1	Silver	Jennifer Chan	Archery	Women's individual compound
2	Silver	Adam Jimenez III; Earl Benjamin Yap; Gil Gabriel	Archery	Men's team compound
3	Silver	Regie Sanchez	Arnis	Men's individual Anyo Forms
4	Silver	Mylen Garson	Arnis	Women's individual Anyo Forms
5	Silver	Renato Tuñacao	Arnis	Men's sparring 71kg Full Contact
6	Silver	Ernie Candelario	Athletics	Men's 400m
7	Silver	Midel Dique	Athletics	Men's 800m
8	Silver	Julius Sermona	Athletics	Men's 5000m
9	Silver	Eduardo Buenavista	Athletics	Men's 10000m
10	Silver	Arnold Villarube; Ralph Waldy Soguilon; Albert Salcedo; Henry Dagmil	Athletics	Men's 4 × 100 m Relay
11	Silver	Roy Vence	Athletics	Men's Marathon
12	Silver	Joebert Delicano	Athletics	Men's triple jump
13	Silver	Jerro Perater	Athletics	Men's hammer throw
14	Silver	Mercedita Manipol	Athletics	Women's 5000m
15	Silver	Lerma Elmira Gabito	Athletics	Women's long jump
16	Silver	Rosie Villarito	Athletics	Women's javelin throw
17	Silver	Lee Vann Corteza	Billiards	Men's 8-Ball Pool Singles
18	Silver	Antonio Gabica	Billiards	Men's 15-Ball Pool Singles
19	Silver	Markwin Tee	Bowling	Men's singles
20	Silver	Christian Jan Suarez; Ernesto Gatchalian Jr. Constantine Chester King	Bowling	Men's trios
21	Silver	Christian Jan Suarez; Ernesto Gatchalian Jr. Constantine Chester King; Markwin Tee; Tyrone Christopher Ongpauco	Bowling	Men's team of Five
22	Silver	Maria Cecilia Yap; Liza Clutario	Bowling	Women's doubles
23	Silver	Maria Cecilia Yap; Liza Clutario; Maria Liza del Rosario	Bowling	Women's trios
24	Silver	Maria Cecilia Yap; Liza Clutario; Maria Liza del Rosario; Elaine Florencio; Josephine Canare	Bowling	Women's team of Five
25	Silver	Joegin Ladon	Boxing	Men's Featherweight 57kg
26	Silver	Romeo Brin	Boxing	Men's Light Welterweight 64kg
27	Silver	Mark Melligen	Boxing	Men's welterweight 69kg
28	Silver	Reynaldo Galido	Boxing	Men's Middleweight 75kg
29	Silver	Jeremiah Tambor; John Oliver Victorio	Canoeing	Men's C2 500m
30	Silver	Oliver Dimakiling	Chess	Men's Blitz
31	Silver	Eugene Torre; Rogelio Antonio Jr. Nelson Mariano II; Petronio Roca; Barlo Nadera	Chess	Men's Rapid Team
32	Silver	Eugenio Torre; Rogelio Antonio Jr. Oliver Barbosa; Ronald Dableo	Chess	Men's Standard Team
33	Silver	Sheerie Joy Lomibao; Beverly Mendoza; Enerose Magno; Shercila Cua	Chess	Women's Standard Team
34	Silver	Philippines	Cycling	Men's 4km Track Racing Team Pursuit
35	Silver	Baby Marites Bitbit	Cycling	Women's Road Individual Time Trial
36	Silver	Joey Barba	Cycling	Men's Mountain Downhill
37	Silver	Frederick Feliciano	Cycling	Men's cross country MTB
38	Silver	Emmanuel Reyes; Maira Rosete	Dancesport	Standard
39	Silver	John Erolle Melencio; Dearlie Gerodias	Dancesport	Latin
40	Silver	Rexel Ryan Fabriga	Diving	Men's 10m platform
41	Silver	Toni Leviste	Equestrian	Individual Jumping
42	Silver	Nathaniel San Juan	Fencing	Men's individual Épée
43	Silver	Gian Carlo Nocom; Walbert Mendoza; Edward Daliva; Edmon Valdez	Fencing	Men's team sabre
44	Silver	Joanna Franquelli	Fencing	Women's individual Sabre
45	Silver	Czarinah Buenviaje	Golf	Women's individual
46	Silver	Jayvie Marie Agojo; Frances Noelle Bondad; Ana Imelda Tanpinco	Golf	Women's team
47	Silver	Roel Ramirez	Gymnastics	Horizontal Bar
48	Silver	Nancy Quillotes	Judo	Women's 48kg
49	Silver	Ruth Dugaduga	Judo	Women's 78kg
50	Silver	Lloncio Carreon; Christopher Dagpin	Lawn bowls	Men's pairs
51	Silver	Paula Francisco	Lawn bowls	Women's singles
52	Silver	Ellenita Atkins; Sonia Bruce; Rosita Bradborn	Lawn bowls	Women's triples
53	Silver	Rogelio Garganera; Davis Panisigan	Muay Thai	Men's Waikru 57-60kg
54	Silver	Zaidi Laruan	Muay Thai	Men's Flyweight Combat 48-51kg
55	Silver	Brent Velasco	Muay Thai	Men's Bantamweight Combat 51-54kg
56	Silver	Christopher Yabut	Pencak Silat	Men's Combat Class B 50-55kg
57	Silver	Annaliza Bea	Pencak Silat	Women's Combat Class B 50-55kg
58	Silver	Joel Bagsabas; Nilo Cordova; Alvin Amposta; Nestor Cordova	Rowing	Men's Coxless Four
59	Silver	Reneric Moreno	Sailing	Men's Formula
60	Silver	Deseree Autor; Eden Bernardo; Gelyn Evora; Irene Apdon; Rhea Padrigo; Sarah Catain	Sepak Takraw	Women's Hoop
61	Silver	Nathaniel Padilla	Shooting	Men's 25m Standard Pistol
62	Silver	Ariel Santos	Shooting	Men's Practical Shotgun Events
63	Silver	Marly Llorito	Shooting	Women's Modified Practical Shotgun Pistol
64	Silver	Miguel Molina	Swimming	Men's 200m freestyle
65	Silver	James Walsh	Swimming	Men's 200m butterfly
66	Silver	Erica Totten	Swimming	Women's 200m freestyle
67	Silver	Jaclyn Pangilinan	Swimming	Women's 200m Breastrstroke
68	Silver	Lizza Danila; Jaclyn Pangilinan; Erica Totten; Heidi Gem	Swimming	Women's 4 × 100 m Medley Relay
69	Silver	Richard Gonzales	Table Tennis	Men's singles
70	Silver	Alexander Briones	Taekwondo	Men's welterweight 78kg
71	Silver	Dax Alberto Morte	Taekwondo	Men's Middleweight 84kg
72	Silver	Michael Alejandrino	Taekwondo	Men's Heavyweight +84kg
73	Silver	Maria Criselda Roxas	Taekwondo	Women's welterweight 67kg
74	Silver	Veronica Domingo	Taekwondo	Women's Middleweight 72kg
75	Silver	Cecil Mamiit; Eric Taino	Tennis	Men's doubles
76	Silver	Alessandra Araullo	Triathlon	Women's Triathlon
77	Silver	Alan Cesar Payawal; Sherwin Dela Paz; Michael Jorolan; Ricardo Dilap Dilap; Norton Alcantara; Almax Laurel; Frazier Alamara; Teodoro Roy Cañete; Ali Alamara; Dale Evangelista; Danny Dela Torre; Monsuito Pelenio; Tani Gomez	Water Polo	Men's team
78	Silver	Aldonsito Aldanete	Weightlifting	Men's 94kg
79	Silver	Margarito Angana	Wrestling	Men's -55kg
80	Silver	Belinda Lapuente	Wrestling	Women's 51-55kg
81	Silver	Cherry Matriz	Wrestling	Women's 59-63kg
82	Silver	Kenneth Lim	Wushu	Men's taolu Taijiquan/Taijijian
83	Silver	Rexel Nganhayna	Wushu	Men's sanda 56kg
84	Silver	Janice Hung	Wushu	Women's taolu Taijiquan/Taijijian
85	Silver	Jennifer Lagilag	Wushu	Women's sanda 45kg

=== Bronze ===
No.	Medal	Name	Sport	Event
1	Bronze	Marvin Cordero	Archery	Men's individual recurve
2	Bronze	Rachelle Anne Cabral	Archery	Women's individual recurve
3	Bronze	John Lozada	Athletics	Men's 800m
4	Bronze	Rene Herrera	Athletics	Men's 1500m
5	Bronze	Julius Sermona	Athletics	Men's 10000m
6	Bronze	Allan Ballester	Athletics	Men's Marathon
7	Bronze	Emerson Obiena	Athletics	Men's pole vault
8	Bronze	Dandy Gallenero	Athletics	Men's javelin throw
9	Bronze	Mary Grace Melgar	Athletics	Women's 400m hurdles
10	Bronze	Loralie Amahit	Athletics	Women's hammer throw
11	Bronze	Narcisa Atienza	Athletics	Women's Heptathlon
12	Bronze	Reynaldo Grandea	Billiards	Men's One-Cushion Carom
13	Bronze	Warlito Parrenas	Boxing	Men's Flyweight 51kg
14	Bronze	Analiza Crus	Boxing	Women's light flyweight 48kg
15	Bronze	Norwll Cajes	Canoeing	Men's C1 500m
16	Bronze	Marvin Amposta	Canoeing	Men's K1 500m
17	Bronze	Rogelio Antonio Jr.	Chess	Men's Blitz
18	Bronze	Eugenio Torre	Chess	Men's Rapid
19	Bronze	Catherine Perena	Chess	Women's Blitz
20	Bronze	Philippines	Cycling	Men's 4km Track Racing Sprint
21	Bronze	Michael Borja	Cycling	Men's Mountain Downhill
22	Bronze	Eusedio Quinones	Cycling	Men's cross country MTB
23	Bronze	Zardo Domenios	Diving	Men's 1m springboard
24	Bronze	Zardo Domenios	Diving	Men's 3m springboard
25	Bronze	Juan Ramon Lanza	Equestrian	Individual Jumping
26	Bronze	Carlo Gian Nocom	Fencing	Men's individual Sabre
27	Bronze	Ramil Endriano	Fencing	Men's individual Foil
28	Bronze	Avelino Victorino Jr.	Fencing	Men's individual Épée
29	Bronze	Ma. Wendylene Mendoza; Jocelyn Naval; Joanna Franquelli; Lenita Reyes	Fencing	Women's team sabre
30	Bronze	Ma. Wendylene Mendoza; Veena Tessa Nuestro; Michelle Mancenido; Lenita Reyes	Fencing	Women's team Foil
31	Bronze	Melly Joyce Angeles; Mary Catherine Kong; Harlene Orendain; Michelle Mancenido	Fencing	Women's team Épée
32	Bronze	Al Ramirez; Brydon Sy; Roel Ramirez; Neil Faustino; Ronnie Ramirez	Gymnastics	Men's team All-Around
33	Bronze	Roel Ramirez	Gymnastics	Men's individual all-around
34	Bronze	Brydon Sy	Gymnastics	Parallel Bars
35	Bronze	Kaissa Saguisag	Gymnastics	Women's vault
36	Bronze	Danica Calapatan	Gymnastics	Rhythmic Clubs
37	Bronze	Danica Calapatan	Gymnastics	Rhythmic Rope
38	Bronze	Brian Peralta	Gymnastics	Men's Aerobic Individual
39	Bronze	Franco Teves	Judo	Men's 55kg
40	Bronze	Daniel Pedro	Judo	Men's 60kg
41	Bronze	Aristotle Lucero	Judo	Men's 66kg
42	Bronze	Tomohiko Hoshina	Judo	Men's +100kg
43	Bronze	Elmarie Malasan	Judo	Women's 52kg
44	Bronze	Esty Gay Liwanen	Judo	Women's 63kg
45	Bronze	Noel Espinosa	Karate	Men's individual Kata
46	Bronze	Stephanie Lim	Karate	Women's individual Kata
47	Bronze	Philippines	Karate	Men's team Kata
48	Bronze	Junel Perania	Karate	Men's kumite 70kg
49	Bronze	Joey Pabillore	Karate	Men's kumite +75kg
50	Bronze	Philippines	Karate	Men's team kumite
51	Bronze	Mae Eso Soriano	Karate	Women's kumite 48kg
52	Bronze	Cherli Tugday	Karate	Women's kumite 60kg
53	Bronze	Gretchen Malalad	Karate	Women's kumite Open Weight
54	Bronze	Reynaldo Samia; Angelo Morales; Herminio Dagpin	Lawn bowls	Men's triples
55	Bronze	Ronalyn Greenless; Amy Gardoce	Lawn bowls	Women's pairs
56	Bronze	Reynold Tresmonte	Muay Thai	Men's Featherweight Combat 54-57kg
57	Bronze	Ameraida Asmad; Carla Arang; Donabel Galera	Pencak Silat	Women's Art Team
58	Bronze	Jul Omar Abdulhakim	Pencak Silat	Men's Combat Class A 45-50kg
59	Bronze	Adzhar Abdurazad	Pencak Silat	Men's Combat Class C 55-60kg
60	Bronze	Nerlyn Huinda	Pencak Silat	Women's Combat Class A 45-50kg
61	Bronze	Juvy Jumuad	Pencak Silat	Women's Combat Class C 55-60kg
62	Bronze	Philippines	Petanque	Women's singles
63	Bronze	Jose Rodriguez	Rowing	Men's single sculls
64	Bronze	Nida Cordova	Rowing	Women's single sculls
65	Bronze	Nida Cordova; Maria Concepcion Fornea	Rowing	Women's Coxless Pair
66	Bronze	Ridgely Balladares; Rommel Chavez	Sailing	Men's 470
67	Bronze	Rafael Buitre; Richly Magsanay	Sailing	Men's Open 420
68	Bronze	Louie Perfectua; Mark Gil Francisco	Sailing	Men's Hobie 16
69	Bronze	Danilo Apilan; Harrison Castanares; Hector Mamarion; Joel Carbonilla; Metodio Suico; Michael Jose	Sepak Takraw	Men's Hoop
70	Bronze	Eric Ang	Shooting	Men's Trap
71	Bronze	Anna Maria Gana	Shooting	Women's Trap
72	Bronze	Robert Garcia	Squash	Men's singles
73	Bronze	Ryan Arabejo	Swimming	Men's 1500m freestyle
74	Bronze	Raphael Matthew Chua	Swimming	Men's 100m breaststroke
75	Bronze	Evan Grabador; Raphael Matthew Chua; James Walsh; Miguel Molina	Swimming	Men's 4 × 100 m Medley Relay
76	Bronze	Jaclyn Pangilinan	Swimming	Women's 100m breaststroke
77	Bronze	Lizza Danila; Heidi Gem; Bianca Uy; Erica Totten	Swimming	Women's 4 × 100 m freestyle relay
78	Bronze	Marichi Gandionco; Chrizel Lagunday; Nichole Santiago; Erica Totten	Swimming	Women's 4 × 200 m freestyle relay
79	Bronze	Richard Gonzales; Julius Esposo; Ernesto Ebuen	Table Tennis	Men's team
80	Bronze	Sally Solis	Taekwondo	Women's Heavyweight +72kg
81	Bronze	Eric Taino	Tennis	Men's singles
82	Bronze	Denise Dy; Riza Zalameda	Tennis	Women's doubles
83	Bronze	Denise Dy; Riza Zalameda; Czarina Arevalo	Tennis	Women's team
84	Bronze	Arland Macasieb	Triathlon	Men's Triathlon
85	Bronze	Philippines	Volleyball	Women's Indoor Team
86	Bronze	Heidi Illustre; Diane Pascua	Volleyball	Women's Beach Team
87	Bronze	Renante Briones	Weightlifting	Men's 105kg
88	Bronze	Arvin delos Santos	Weightlifting	Men's +105kg
89	Bronze	Cecilia Atilano	Weightlifting	Women's 63kg
90	Bronze	Melchor Tumasis	Wrestling	Men's 55-60kg
91	Bronze	Michael Baletin	Wrestling	Men's 66-74kg
92	Bronze	Alvin Ting	Wushu	Men's taolu Changquan
93	Bronze	Mark Eddiva	Wushu	Men's sanda 60kg

=== Multiple ===
Name	Sport	1st place, gold medalist(s)	2nd place, silver medalist(s)	3rd place, bronze medalist(s)	Total
Miguel Molina	Swimming	3	1	1	5
Cecil Mamiit	Tennis	3	1	0	4
Alex Pagulayan	Billiards	3	0	0	3
Benjamin Tolentino Jr.	Rowing	3	0	0	3
Sheila Mae Perez	Diving	3	0	0	3
Roel Ramirez	Gymnastics	2	1	2	5
Aida Yang	Wushu	2	0	0	2
Amaya Paz	Archery	2	0	0	2
Jimar Aing	Athletics	2	0	0	2
Juvic Pagunsan	Golf	2	0	0	2
Leonardo Andam	Billiards	2	0	0	2
Paul Brian Rosario	Shooting	2	0	0	2
Renato Alcano	Billiards	2	0	0	2
Rubilen Amit	Billiards	2	0	0	2
Vicky Ting	Wushu	2	0	0	2
Willy Wang	Wushu	2	0	0	2
Liza Clutario	Bowling	1	3	0	4
Maria Cecilia Yap	Bowling	1	3	0	4
Ernesto Gatchalian Jr.	Bowling	1	2	0	2
Markwin Tee	Bowling	1	2	0	3
Eric Taino	Tennis	1	1	1	3
Antonio Gabica	Billiards	1	1	0	2
Baby Marites Bitbit	Cycling	1	1	0	2
Christian Jan Suarez	Bowling	1	1	0	2
Ernie Candelario	Athletics	1	1	0	2
Henry Dagmil	Athletics	1	1	0	2
Jennifer Chan	Archery	1	1	0	2
Lee Vann Corteza	Billiards	1	1	0	2
Mercidita Manipol	Athletics	1	1	0	2
Rexel Ryan Fabriga	Diving	1	1	0	2
Toni Leviste	Equestrian	1	1	0	2
Walbert Mendoza	Fencing	1	1	0	2
Riza Zalameda	Tennis	1	0	2	3
Zardo Domenios	Diving	1	0	2	3
Gretchen Malalad	Karate	1	0	1	2
Veena Tessa Nuestro	Fencing	1	0	1	2
Juan Ramon Lanza	Equestrian	1	0	1	2
Rene Herrera	Athletics	1	0	1	2
Erica Totten	Swimming	0	2	2	4
Eugene Torre	Chess	0	2	1	3
Jaclyn Pangilinan	Swimming	0	2	1	3
Rogelio Antonio Jr.	Chess	0	2	1	3
Constantine Chester King	Bowling	0	2	0	2
Maria Liza del Rosario	Bowling	0	2	0	2
Heidi Gem	Swimming	0	1	1	2
James Walsh	Swimming	0	1	1	2
Joanna Franquelli	Fencing	0	1	1	2
Julius Sermona	Athletics	0	1	1	2
Lizza Danila	Swimming	0	1	1	2
Richard Gonzales	Table Tennis	0	1	1	2
Denise Dy	Tennis	0	0	2	2
Nida Cordova	Rowing	0	0	2	2
Raphael Matthew Chua	Swimming	0	0	2	2

== Medal summary ==
=== By sports ===
Sport	Gold	Silver	Bronze	Total
Wushu	11	4	2	17
Athletics	9	11	9	29
Aquatics	9	7	8	24
Boxing	8	4	2	14
Billiards and snooker	8	2	1	11
Traditional boat race	6	0	0	6
Taekwondo	5	5	1	11
Fencing	5	3	6	14
Wrestling	5	3	2	10
Bowling	4	6	0	10
Judo	4	2	6	12
Shooting	3	3	2	8
Muay	3	3	1	7
Arnis	3	3	0	6
Archery	3	2	2	7
Rowing	3	1	3	7
Tennis	3	1	3	7
Karate	3	0	9	12
Cycling	2	4	3	9
Dancesport	2	2	0	4
Golf	2	2	0	4
Gymnastics	2	1	7	10
Bodybuilding	2	0	0	2
Softball	2	0	0	2
Lawn bowls	1	3	2	6
Pencak silat	1	2	5	8
Sailing	1	1	3	5
Equestrian	1	1	1	3
Baseball	1	0	0	1
Chess	0	4	3	7
Weightlifting	0	1	3	4
Canoeing	0	1	2	3
Sepak takraw	0	1	1	2
Table tennis	0	1	1	2
Triathlon	0	1	1	2
Volleyball	0	0	2	2
Pétanque	0	0	1	1
Squash	0	0	1	1
Totals (38 entries)	112	85	93	290
