= Taekwondo at the 2005 SEA Games =

Taekwondo competition

- Venue: Cuneta Astrodome
- Location: Pasay, Metro Manila
- Date: November 28–30

Taekwondo at the 2005 SEA Games were held in the Cuneta Astrodome in Roxas Boulevard, Pasay, Metro Manila, Philippines. The participants competed for one of sixteen gold medals, eight each for men and women.

== Medal table ==
* Host nation (Philippines)

Rank	Nation	Gold	Silver	Bronze	Total
1	Philippines (PHI)*	5	5	1	11
2	Vietnam (VIE)	4	3	6	13
3	Thailand (THA)	3	4	1	8
4	Indonesia (INA)	2	3	6	11
5	Malaysia (MAS)	2	0	5	7
6	Myanmar (MYA)	0	1	4	5
7	Laos (LAO)	0	1	3	4
8	Brunei (BRU)	0	1	0	1
9	Cambodia (CAM)	0	0	1	1
Totals (9 entries)		16	18	27	61

== Medalists ==
=== Men ===
Event	Gold	Silver	Bronze
Finweight; 54 kg	Japoy Lizardo; Philippines	Chutchawal Khawlaor; Thailand	Kyaw Kyaw Htoo; Myanmar
Finweight; 54 kg	Japoy Lizardo; Philippines	Chutchawal Khawlaor; Thailand	Thongkamh Vongphakdy; Laos
Flyweight; 58 kg	Rusfredy Tokan Petrus; Malaysia	Ussadate Sutthikunkarn; Thailand	Đinh Thành Long; Vietnam
Flyweight; 58 kg	Rusfredy Tokan Petrus; Malaysia	Ussadate Sutthikunkarn; Thailand	Soe Moe Lwin; Myanmar
Bantamweight; 62 kg	Tshomlee Go; Philippines	Vũ Anh Tuấn; Vietnam	Mohd Afifuddin Omar Sidek; Malaysia
Bantamweight; 62 kg	Tshomlee Go; Philippines	Vũ Anh Tuấn; Vietnam	Thongsavay Phommachanh; Laos
Featherweight; 67 kg	Chanatha Thanaroekchai; Thailand	Taufik Krisna Nugraha; Indonesia	Syed Taufiq Abd Hamid; Malaysia
Featherweight; 67 kg	Chanatha Thanaroekchai; Thailand	Taufik Krisna Nugraha; Indonesia	Bout Vichet; Cambodia
Lightweight; 72 kg	Donald Geisler; Philippines	Patiwat Thongsalap; Thailand	Sawatvilay Phimmasone; Laos
Lightweight; 72 kg	Donald Geisler; Philippines	Patiwat Thongsalap; Thailand	Cao Trọng Chinh; Vietnam
Welterweight; 78 kg	Basuki Nugroho; Indonesia	Alexander Briones; Philippines	Le Phi Long; Vietnam
Welterweight; 78 kg	Basuki Nugroho; Indonesia	Alexander Briones; Philippines	Wong Kai Meng; Malaysia
Middleweight; 84 kg	Nguyễn Trọng Cường; Vietnam	Dax Alberto Morte; Philippines	Kanjanabhaj Radanasoongnoen; Thailand
Middleweight; 84 kg	Nguyễn Trọng Cường; Vietnam	Dax Alberto Morte; Philippines	Rosandi; Indonesia
Heavyweight +84 kg	Nguyễn Văn Hùng; Vietnam	Michael Alejandrino; Philippines	Teguh Waskito; Indonesia

=== Women ===
Event	Gold	Silver	Bronze
Finweight; 47 kg	Nguyễn Thị Huyền Diệu; Vietnam	Sadavanh Khounviseth; Laos	Thiri Tint Lwin; Myanmar
Finweight; 47 kg	Nguyễn Thị Huyền Diệu; Vietnam	Sadavanh Khounviseth; Laos	Fransisca Valentina; Indonesia
Flyweight; 51 kg	Đỗ Thị Bích Hạnh; Vietnam	Soe Soe Myar; Myanmar	Noornadia Norrizan; Malaysia
Flyweight; 51 kg	Đỗ Thị Bích Hạnh; Vietnam	Soe Soe Myar; Myanmar	Rahadewi Neta; Indonesia
Bantamweight; 55 kg	Juana Wangsa Putri; Indonesia	Farrahwaheeda Haji Bujang; Brunei	not awarded
Bantamweight; 55 kg	Juana Wangsa Putri; Indonesia	Lê Thị Thu Nguyệt; Vietnam	not awarded
Featherweight; 59 kg	Kirstie Alora; Philippines	Kanyarat Mathurakarn; Thailand	not awarded
Featherweight; 59 kg	Kirstie Alora; Philippines	Nguyễn Thị Hoài Thu; Vietnam	not awarded
Lightweight; 63 kg	Toni Rivero; Philippines	Voppy Trisnawati; Indonesia	Bùi Thu Hiền; Vietnam
Lightweight; 63 kg	Toni Rivero; Philippines	Voppy Trisnawati; Indonesia	San Ngu Wah Sue; Myanmar
Welterweight; 67 kg	Chonnapas Premwaew; Thailand	Maria Criselda Roxas; Philippines	Gayathri Arumugam; Malaysia
Welterweight; 67 kg	Chonnapas Premwaew; Thailand	Maria Criselda Roxas; Philippines	Eka Sahara; Indonesia
Middleweight; 72 kg	Che Chew Chan; Malaysia	Veronica Domingo; Philippines	Iin Retno Famulat; Indonesia
Middleweight; 72 kg	Che Chew Chan; Malaysia	Veronica Domingo; Philippines	Trần Thị Ngọc Trâm; Vietnam
Heavyweight +72 kg	Rapatkorn Prasopsuk; Thailand	Amalia Kurniasih Palupi; Indonesia	Sally Solis; Philippines
Heavyweight +72 kg	Rapatkorn Prasopsuk; Thailand	Amalia Kurniasih Palupi; Indonesia	Trần Thị Ngọc Bích; Vietnam

== See also ==
- Taekwondo in the Philippines
