= Boxing at the 2005 SEA Games =

Boxing competitions

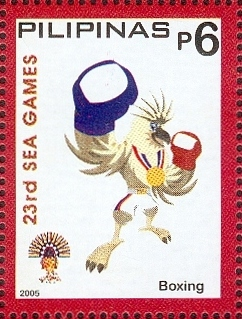
- Logo of boxing at the 2005 Southeast Asian Games on a 2005 stamp of the Philippines
- Venue: USLS Coliseum
- Location: Bacolod, Negros Occidental
- Date: November 28 – December 4

Boxing at the 2005 SEA Games took place in the University of St. La Salle Coliseum in Bacolod, Negros Occidental, Philippines.

The event traditionally was only open to males in the Olympic Games. In the 2005 edition of the games women compete in some selected events. Bouts were contested over four rounds of two minutes each. Five judges score the fighters and the boxer with the most points at the end was the winner.

== Medal table ==
* Host nation (Philippines)

Rank	Nation	Gold	Silver	Bronze	Total
1	Philippines (PHI)*	8	4	2	14
2	Thailand (THA)	6	2	2	10
3	Myanmar (MYA)	0	4	2	6
4	Vietnam (VIE)	0	3	4	7
5	Indonesia (INA)	0	1	10	11
6	Laos (LAO)	0	0	3	3
6	Malaysia (MAS)	0	0	3	3
8	Cambodia (CAM)	0	0	2	2
Totals (8 entries)		14	14	28	56

== Medalists ==
=== Men ===
Event	Gold	Silver	Bronze
Pinweight; 45 kg	Juanito Magliquian Jr. Philippines	Zaw Myo Min; Myanmar	Kaeo Pongprayoon; Thailand
Pinweight; 45 kg	Juanito Magliquian Jr. Philippines	Zaw Myo Min; Myanmar	Sikham Vongphaoune; Laos
Light flyweight 48 kg	Harry Tañamor; Philippines	Kyan Shan Aung; Myanmar	Zamzadi Azizi Bin Mohammad; Malaysia
Light flyweight 48 kg	Harry Tañamor; Philippines	Kyan Shan Aung; Myanmar	Romando Butar Butar; Indonesia
Flyweight; 51 kg	Somjit Jongjohor; Thailand	Trần Quốc Việt; Vietnam	Warlito Parrenas; Philippines
Flyweight; 51 kg	Somjit Jongjohor; Thailand	Trần Quốc Việt; Vietnam	Dastena Moniaga; Indonesia
Bantamweight; 54 kg	Joan Tipon; Philippines	Thangthong Klongjan; Thailand	Sayyalak Chatasone; Laos
Bantamweight; 54 kg	Joan Tipon; Philippines	Thangthong Klongjan; Thailand	Dadan Amanda; Indonesia
Featherweight; 57 kg	Worapoj Petchkoom; Thailand	Joegin Ladon; Philippines	Nguyễn Trung Kiên; Vietnam
Featherweight; 57 kg	Worapoj Petchkoom; Thailand	Joegin Ladon; Philippines	Eddey Kalai; Malaysia
Lightweight; 60 kg	Genebert Basadre; Philippines	Miftah Rifai Lubis; Indonesia	Đỗ Đức Thành; Vietnam
Lightweight; 60 kg	Genebert Basadre; Philippines	Miftah Rifai Lubis; Indonesia	Paunandes Paulus; Malaysia
Light welterweight 64 kg	Pichai Sayota; Thailand	Romeo Brin; Philippines	Aung Thura; Myanmar
Light welterweight 64 kg	Pichai Sayota; Thailand	Romeo Brin; Philippines	Cao Văn Trưởng; Vietnam
Welterweight; 69 kg	Non Boonjumnong; Thailand	Mark Melligen; Philippines	Min Saiheng; Cambodia
Welterweight; 69 kg	Non Boonjumnong; Thailand	Mark Melligen; Philippines	Toar Sompotan; Indonesia
Middleweight; 75 kg	Suriya Prasathinphimai; Thailand	Reynaldo Galido; Philippines	Ath Samreth; Cambodia
Middleweight; 75 kg	Suriya Prasathinphimai; Thailand	Reynaldo Galido; Philippines	Bara Gommies; Indonesia

=== Women ===
Event	Gold	Silver	Bronze
Pinweight; 46 kg	Alice Aparri; Philippines	Kyu Kyu Thi; Myanmar	Sein Gereta; Indonesia
Pinweight; 46 kg	Alice Aparri; Philippines	Kyu Kyu Thi; Myanmar	Ranjana Thongtaisong; Thailand
Light flyweight 48 kg	Usanakorn Thawilsuhannawang; Thailand	Naw Mu Chay; Myanmar	Analiza Cruz; Philippines
Light flyweight 48 kg	Usanakorn Thawilsuhannawang; Thailand	Naw Mu Chay; Myanmar	Rumyris Simarmata; Indonesia
Flyweight; 50 kg	Annie Albania; Philippines	Vũ Thị Hải Yến; Vietnam	Nilar; Myanmar
Flyweight; 50 kg	Annie Albania; Philippines	Vũ Thị Hải Yến; Vietnam	Veronica Nicolas; Indonesia
Bantamweight; 54 kg	Jouvilet Chilem; Philippines	Tạ Thị Minh Nghĩa; Vietnam	Marivone Phimsompttu; Laos
Bantamweight; 54 kg	Jouvilet Chilem; Philippines	Tạ Thị Minh Nghĩa; Vietnam	Eliza Wati; Indonesia
Lightweight; 60 kg	Mitchel Martinez; Philippines	Ratree Kruake; Thailand	Đinh Thị Phương Thanh; Vietnam
Lightweight; 60 kg	Mitchel Martinez; Philippines	Ratree Kruake; Thailand	Agnes Datunsolung; Indonesia
