= Muay Thai at the 2005 SEA Games =

Muay Thai at the 2005 Southeast Asian Games
- Venue: GSIS Bldg.
- Location: Pasay, Metro Manila
- Date: December 1–4

Muay Thai at the 2005 Southeast Asian Games took place in the Government Service Insurance System Assembly Hall in Pasay, Metro Manila, Philippines.

The event was held from December 1–4.

== Medal table ==
* Host nation (Philippines)

Rank	Nation	Gold	Silver	Bronze	Total
1	Philippines*	3	3	1	7
2	Thailand	3	2	0	5
3	Laos	1	0	4	5
4	Myanmar	0	0	4	4
Totals (4 entries)		7	5	9	21

== Medalists ==
=== Wai Kru ===
Event	Gold	Silver	Bronze
Men's 57−60 kg	Thailand; Opas Sualek; Taweesak Mennoi	Philippines; Rogelio Garganera; Davis Panisigan	Laos; Langsanh Masopha; Khammouane Khonovanh
Women's 51−54 kg	Philippines; Claire Cadampong; Lianne Flameno	not awarded	not awarded
Women's 54−57 kg	Philippines; Victoria Agbayani; Cristina Custodio	not awarded	not awarded

=== Combat ===
Event	Gold	Silver	Bronze
Light flyweight 45−48 kg	Roland Claro; Philippines	Uchaim Yingram; Thailand	Khammouane Khonovanh; Laos
Light flyweight 45−48 kg	Roland Claro; Philippines	Uchaim Yingram; Thailand	Thu Ra Lin Htut; Myanmar
Flyweight; 48−51 kg	Virapong Nonting; Thailand	Zaidi Laruan; Philippines	Phanvilay Rattanabounmy; Laos
Flyweight; 48−51 kg	Virapong Nonting; Thailand	Zaidi Laruan; Philippines	Kyaw Min Htike; Myanmar
Bantamweight; 51−54 kg	Mongkhom Punpiboon; Thailand	Brent Velaco; Philippines	Xanxia Boonthavy; Laos
Bantamweight; 51−54 kg	Mongkhom Punpiboon; Thailand	Brent Velaco; Philippines	Saw Kyaw Aye; Myanmar
Featherweight; 54−57 kg	Langsanh Masopha; Laos	Weerapol Nonting; Thailand	Reynold Tresmonte; Philippines
Featherweight; 54−57 kg	Langsanh Masopha; Laos	Weerapol Nonting; Thailand	Tun Lin; Myanmar
