= Shooting at the 2005 SEA Games =

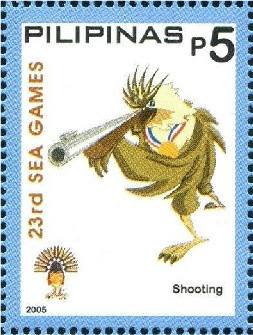
- Logo of shooting at the 2005 Southeast Asian Games on a 2005 stamp of the Philippines
- Venue: PSC-PNSA Shooting Range BNS; PNSA Clay Target Range (trap & skeet)
- Location: Fort Bonifacio, Taguig City, Metro Manila; Muntinlupa, Metro Manila (trap & skeet)
- Start date: November 28, 2005
- End date: December 4, 2005

Shooting at the 2005 SEA Games was split into two venues:

- Trap and Skeet in PNSA Clay Target Range, Muntinlupa, Metro Manila, Philippines.
- Air Pistol, Rifle, Practical in the PSC-PNSA Shooting Range BNS in Fort Bonifacio, Taguig City, Metro Manila, Philippines.

== Medal table ==
* Host nation (Philippines)

| Rank | Nation | Gold | Silver | Bronze | Total |
|---|---|---|---|---|---|
| 1 | Thailand (THA) | 9 | 7 | 6 | 22 |
| 2 | Vietnam (VIE) | 3 | 4 | 5 | 12 |
| 3 | Philippines (PHI)* | 3 | 3 | 2 | 8 |
| 4 | Malaysia (MAS) | 3 | 2 | 2 | 7 |
| 5 | Singapore (SIN) | 2 | 4 | 4 | 10 |
| 6 | Myanmar (MYA) | 1 | 2 | 2 | 5 |
| 7 | Indonesia (INA) | 1 | 0 | 1 | 2 |
| Totals (7 entries) | | 22 | 22 | 22 | 66 |

== Medalists ==
=== International Shooting Sport Federation ===
==== Men ====
| Event | Gold | Silver | Bronze |
|---|---|---|---|
| 10 m air pistol | Maung Kyu; Myanmar | Jakkrit Panichpatikum; Thailand | Hoàng Xuân Vinh; Vietnam |
| 25 m standard pistol | Jakkrit Panichpatikum; Thailand | Nguyễn Mạnh Tường; Vietnam | Phạm Cao Sơn; Vietnam |
| 25 m rapid fire pistol | Hasli Izwan; Malaysia | Nathaniel Padilla; Philippines | Jakkrit Panichpatikum; Thailand |
| 25 m center fire pistol | Jakkrit Panichpatikum; Thailand | Opas Ruengpanyawut; Thailand | Nguyễn Mạnh Tường; Vietnam |
| 50 m free pistol | Nguyễn Mạnh Tường; Vietnam | Maung Kyu; Myanmar | Poh Lip Meng; Singapore |
| 10 m air rifle | Tevarit Majchacheep; Thailand | Nguyễn Tấn Nam; Vietnam | Zhang Jin; Singapore |
| 50 m rifle prone | Nguyễn Tấn Nam; Vietnam | Suphakorn Wisetchai; Thailand | Khin Maung Htoo; Myanmar |
| Skeet | Paul Brian Rosario; Philippines | Cheong Yew Kwan; Malaysia | The Chee Fei; Malaysia |
| Skeet team | Philippines; Paul Brian Rosario; Darius Alexis Hizon; Nonoy Bernardo | Malaysia; Cheong Yew Kwan; The Chee Fei; Amran Risman | Thailand; Krisada Varadharmapinich; Jiranunt Hathaichukiat; Pongstorn Bholganist |
| Trap | Choo Choon Seng; Singapore | Lee Wung Yew; Singapore | Eric Ang; Philippines |
| Double trap | Zain Amat; Singapore | Puai Khamgasem; Thailand | Khor Seng Chye; Malaysia |

==== Women ====
| Event | Gold | Silver | Bronze |
|---|---|---|---|
| 10 m air pistol | Bary Agustini Said; Indonesia | Panchang Chisa-ard; Thailand | Khin Soe Thaike; Myanmar |
| 25 m pistol | Bibiana Ng; Malaysia | Khin Soe Thaike; Myanmar | Phạm Thị Hà; Vietnam |
| 10 m air rifle | Đàm Thị Nga; Vietnam | Vanessa Yong Yu Zhen; Singapore | Zhang Jingna; Singapore |
| 50 m rifle prone | Nur Suryani Taibi; Malaysia | Paramapon Ponglaokham; Thailand | Supamas Wankaew; Thailand |
| 50 m rifle 3 positions | Paramapon Ponglaokham; Thailand | Nguyễn Thị Hằng; Vietnam | Nguyễn Thị Hòa; Vietnam |
| Trap | Supawan Karjaejuntasak; Thailand | Nanpapas Viravaidya; Thailand | Anna Maria Gana; Philippines |
| Double trap | Janejira Srisongkram; Thailand | Hoàng Thị Tuất; Vietnam | Chattaya Kitcharoen; Thailand |

=== International Practical Shooting Confederation ===
==== Men ====
| Event | Gold | Silver | Bronze |
|---|---|---|---|
| Modified practical pistol | Kasem Khamhaeng; Thailand | Chow Wei An; Singapore | Frans Paul; Indonesia |
| Practical shotgun events | Juanito Angeles; Philippines | Ariel Santos; Philippines | Tan Guan Hua; Singapore |
| Practical shotgun pump | Patrachatra Vichiensun; Thailand | Laurence John Wee Ewe Lay; Singapore | Pitipoom Phasee; Thailand |

==== Women ====
| Event | Gold | Silver | Bronze |
|---|---|---|---|
| Modified practical pistol | Phaviga Thangsuk; Thailand | Marly Llorito; Philippines | Pyathida Aroonsakul; Thailand |
