= Fencing at the 2005 SEA Games =

- Venue: Pasig Sports Center
- Location: Pasig, Metro Manila
- Start date: November 28, 2005
- End date: December 1, 2005

Fencing at the 2005 SEA Games logo

Fencing at the 2005 SEA Games took place at the Pasig Sports Center at the City Hall Complex in Pasig, Metro Manila, Philippines. Ten gold medals were awarded in individual and team events further divided into three separate categories: Épée, Foil and Sabre.

== Summary ==
* Host nation (Philippines)

Rank	Nation	Gold	Silver	Bronze	Total
1	Philippines (PHI)*	5	3	6	14
2	Thailand (THA)	3	5	4	12
3	Vietnam (VIE)	2	4	7	13
4	Indonesia (INA)	1	1	5	7
5	Singapore (SIN)	1	0	2	3
Totals (5 entries)		12	13	24	49

== Medal winners ==
Event	Gold	Silver	Bronze
Men's Individual Sabre	Walbert Mendoza (Philippines)	Wiradech Kothny (Thailand)	Nguyen Van Que (Vietnam) Carlo Gian Nocom (Philippines)
Men's Individual Foil	Nontapat Panchan (Thailand)	Elvizar (Indonesia)	Bui Van Thai (Vietnam) Ramil Endriano (Philippines)
Men's Individual Épée	Siriroj Rathprasert (Thailand)	Nathaniel San Juan (Philippines)	Avelino Victorino Jr. (Philippines) INA
Men's Team Sabre	Thailand	Philippines Gian Carlo Nocom; Walbert Mendoza; Edward Daliva; Edmon Velez	Vietnam Indonesia
Men's Team Foil	Philippines Rolando Canlas; Emerson Segui; Ramil Endriano; Mark Denver Atienza	Vietnam	Indonesia Thailand
Men's Team Épée	Philippines Richard Gomez; Avelino Victorino Jr. Wilfredo Vizcayno; Armando Bernal	Thailand	Vietnam Singapore Lin Qinghui; Nicholas Fang; Ang Chez Yee; Leong Kok Seng
Women's Individual Sabre	Nguyen Thi Le Dung (Vietnam)	Joanna Franquelli (Philippines)	Sirawalai Starrat (Thailand) Nona Lim Yean Hong (Singapore)
Women's Individual Foil	Veena Tessa Nuestro (Philippines)	Nu Chantasuvannasin (Thailand)	Candraeni (Indonesia) Nguyen Thi Tuoi (Vietnam)
Women's Individual Épée	Melly Joyce Angeles (Philippines)	Nguyen Thi Nhu Hoa (Vietnam)	Siritda Choochokkul (Thailand) Ha Thi Sen (Vietnam)
Women's Team Sabre	Vietnam	Thailand	Indonesia Philippines Ma. Wendylene Mendoza; Jocelyn Naval; Joanna Franquelli; Lenita Reyes
Women's Team Foil	Singapore Ruth Ng; Serene Ser; Tay Yu Ling; Cheryl Wong	Vietnam	Thailand Philippines> Ma. Wendylene Mendoza; Veena Tessa Nuestro; Lenita Reyes; Michelle Mancenido
Women's Team Épée	Indonesia	Thailand	Vietnam Philippines; Melly Joyce Angeles; Mary Catherine Kong; Harlene Orendain; Michelle Mancenido
