= Dancesport at the 2005 SEA Games =

DanceSport at the 2005 SEA Games
- Venue: Main Hall, Waterfront Cebu City Hotel & Casino
- Location: Cebu City, Cebu
- Date: November 27

Dancesport was an event at the 2005 SEA Games. The competition took place on November 27, 2005 in the Main Hall of the Waterfront Cebu City Hotel & Casino in Cebu City, Philippines.

Medals were contested in 2 dance categories.

- Latin American dances
- Standard dances

Dancesport was one of the new disciplines introduced in the 23rd SEA Games due to its popularity to the host country.

== Medal table ==
* Host nation (Philippines)

Rank	Nation	Gold	Silver	Bronze	Total
1	Philippines*	2	2	0	4
2	Thailand	0	0	2	2
Totals (2 entries)		2	2	2	6

== Medalists ==
Event	Gold	Silver	Bronze
Standard	Philippines; Rico Rosima; Filomena Salvador	Philippines; Emmanuel Reyes; Maira Rosete	Thailand; Pawatpong Racha-apai; Chanawan Potimu
Latin	Philippines; Michael Mendoza; Belinda Adora	Philippines; John Erolle Melencio; Dearlie Gerodias	Thailand; Watcharakorn Suasuebpun; Warapa Jumbala
