= Rowing at the 2005 SEA Games =

- Venue: La Mesa Dam
- Location: Novaliches Reservoir; Quezon City, Metro Manila
- Date: November 28 – December 1

Rowing at the 2005 SEA Games took place in the La Mesa Dam, Novaliches Reservoir, Quezon City, Metro Manila, Philippines. The event was held from November 28 to December 1.

== Medal table ==
* Host nation (Philippines)

Rank	Nation	Gold	Silver	Bronze	Total
1	Philippines (PHI)*	3	1	3	7
2	Thailand (THA)	3	1	0	4
3	Indonesia (INA)	2	4	2	8
4	Vietnam (VIE)	1	2	1	4
5	Singapore (SIN)	0	1	1	2
6	Myanmar (MYA)	0	0	2	2
Totals (6 entries)		9	9	9	27

== Medalists ==
=== Men ===
Event	Gold	Silver	Bronze
Single sculls	Ruthtanaphol Theppibal; Thailand	Lasmin; Indonesia	Jose Rodriguez; Philippines
Coxless pair	Philippines; Benjamin Tolentino; Jose Rodriguez	Indonesia; Agus Budi Aji; Iswandi	Vietnam; Hoàng Đức Tân; Nguyễn Hoàng Anh
Coxless four	Indonesia; Agus Budi Aji; Aldino Maryandi; Rodiaman; Iswandi	Philippines; Joel Bagsabas; Nilo Cordova; Alvin Amposta; Nestor Cordova	Myanmar; Thaung Win; Than Aung; Zaw Min; Shwe Hla Win
Lightweight single sculls	Benjamin Tolentino; Philippines	Phan Thanh Hào; Vietnam	Roozaimy Omar; Singapore
Lightweight double sculls	Philippines; Benjamin Tolentino; Alvin Amposta	Thailand; Ruthtanaphol Theppibal; Anupong Thainjam	Indonesia; Jamaludin; Anang Mulyana

=== Women ===
Event	Gold	Silver	Bronze
Single sculls	Pere Koroba; Indonesia	Elsie Lim Kim Hiok; Singapore	Nida Cordova; Philippines
Coxless pair	Vietnam; Đặng Thị Thắm; Mai Thị Dung	Indonesia; Rita; Susilowati	Philippines; Nida Cordova; Maria Concepcion Fornea
Lightweight single sculls	Phuttharaksa Neegree; Thailand	Pere Koroba; Indonesia	Myint Myint Htwe; Myanmar
Lightweight double sculls	Thailand; Bussayamas Phaengkathok; Phuttharaksa Neegree	Vietnam; Hiền Phạm Thị; Nguyễn Thị Thị	Indonesia; Femy Batuwael; Ratna
