= Judo at the 2005 SEA Games =

- Venue: Mandaue Coliseum
- Location: Mandaue City, Cebu
- Date: December 1–4

Judo at the 2005 SEA Games took place in the Mandaue Coliseum, Mandaue City, Cebu, Philippines. The participants competed for 16 gold medals with eight different weight categories in both the men's and women's competitions.

Gold and silver medals in each weight class were determined by a single-elimination bracket. There was a repechage for those who are eliminated by one of the eventual semifinalists. Since there are four semifinalists, this means that four of the losers of the round of 32 (i.e., 25%) faced four of the losers from the round of 16 (50%). The winners of these matches faced the four judokas who have lost in the quarterfinals. The winners, then, of these four matches faced each other to narrow the repechage field down to two judokas. Until this stage, the repechage has been segregated into two distinct halves, with each successive competitor facing another one from the same half of the original bracket; but each of the two judokas who emerge from the repechage challenged the loser of the other bracket's semifinal. (Since these two always come from opposite halves of the original bracket, they could not have faced each other already.) The winners of these two matches were each awarded a bronze medal, making judo unusual among Olympic events in not determining a single third-place finisher.

== Medal table ==
* Host nation (Philippines)

| Rank | Nation | Gold | Silver | Bronze | Total |
|---|---|---|---|---|---|
| 1 | Thailand (THA) | 4 | 5 | 6 | 15 |
| 2 | Vietnam (VIE) | 4 | 2 | 8 | 14 |
| 3 | Philippines (PHI)* | 4 | 2 | 6 | 12 |
| 4 | Indonesia (INA) | 3 | 4 | 4 | 11 |
| 5 | Myanmar (MYA) | 1 | 3 | 5 | 9 |
| 6 | Malaysia (MAS) | 0 | 0 | 3 | 3 |
| Totals (6 entries) | | 16 | 16 | 32 | 64 |

== Medalists ==
| Event | Gold | Silver | Bronze |
|---|---|---|---|
| 55 kg | Nguyễn Duy Khanh; Vietnam | Toni Irawan; Indonesia | Franco Teves; Philippines |
| 55 kg | Nguyễn Duy Khanh; Vietnam | Toni Irawan; Indonesia | Aung Tun Kyaw; Myanmar |
| 60 kg | Trần Văn Đoạt; Vietnam | Chanchai Suksuwan; Thailand | Eldy Gan; Indonesia |
| 60 kg | Trần Văn Đoạt; Vietnam | Chanchai Suksuwan; Thailand | Daniel Pedro; Philippines |
| 66 kg | Peter Taslim; Indonesia | Bodin Panjabutra; Thailand | Aristotle Lucero; Philippines |
| 66 kg | Peter Taslim; Indonesia | Bodin Panjabutra; Thailand | Nguyễn Quốc Hùng; Vietnam |
| 73 kg | Gilbert Ramirez; Philippines | Alexander Ralli; Thailand | Joe Taslim; Indonesia |
| 73 kg | Gilbert Ramirez; Philippines | Alexander Ralli; Thailand | Nguyễn Trần Minh Nhật; Vietnam |
| 81 kg | John Baylon; Philippines | Yan Naing Soe; Myanmar | Chong Wai Keat; Malaysia |
| 81 kg | John Baylon; Philippines | Yan Naing Soe; Myanmar | Achilleus Ralli; Thailand |
| 90 kg | Zin Lin Aung; Myanmar | Dwi Shimanto; Indonesia | Wuttikrai Srisoprap; Thailand |
| 90 kg | Zin Lin Aung; Myanmar | Dwi Shimanto; Indonesia | Tan Chee Keong; Malaysia |
| 100 kg | Pongpitsanu Pratepwadtananon; Thailand | Krisna Bayu; Indonesia | Lý Huỳnh Long; Vietnam |
| 100 kg | Pongpitsanu Pratepwadtananon; Thailand | Krisna Bayu; Indonesia | Nyan Soe; Myanmar |
| +100 kg | Tharalat Sutthiphun; Thailand | Deni Zulfendri; Indonesia | Tomohiko Hoshina; Philippines |
| +100 kg | Tharalat Sutthiphun; Thailand | Deni Zulfendri; Indonesia | Đặng Hào; Vietnam |

=== Women ===
| Event | Gold | Silver | Bronze |
|---|---|---|---|
| 45 kg | Helen Dawa; Philippines | Wanwisa Muenjit; Thailand | Đặng Lê Bích Vân; Vietnam |
| 45 kg | Helen Dawa; Philippines | Wanwisa Muenjit; Thailand | Nwe Nwe Than; Myanmar |
| 48 kg | Văn Ngọc Tú; Vietnam | Nancy Quillotes; Philippines | Yuliati; Indonesia |
| 48 kg | Văn Ngọc Tú; Vietnam | Nancy Quillotes; Philippines | Wanida Klaisuti; Thailand |
| 52 kg | Boossara Sreetanaratn; Thailand | Do Khanh Van; Vietnam | Elmarie Malasan; Philippines |
| 52 kg | Boossara Sreetanaratn; Thailand | Do Khanh Van; Vietnam | Noor Maizura Zainon; Malaysia |
| 57 kg | Endang Sri Lestari Nugrohowati; Indonesia | Nguyễn Thị Kiều; Vietnam | Kanda Jindasawat; Thailand |
| 57 kg | Endang Sri Lestari Nugrohowati; Indonesia | Nguyễn Thị Kiều; Vietnam | Aye Aye Thin; Myanmar |
| 63 kg | Nguyễn Thị Như Ý Vietnam | Wassanaporn Samthong; Thailand | Estie Gay Liwanen; Philippines |
| 63 kg | Nguyễn Thị Như Ý Vietnam | Wassanaporn Samthong; Thailand | Thandar Win; Myanmar |
| 70 kg | Karen Solomon; Philippines | Lay Kaiyar Aung; Myanmar | Nguyễn Thị Dinh; Vietnam |
| 70 kg | Karen Solomon; Philippines | Lay Kaiyar Aung; Myanmar | Monrudee Krongthanee; Thailand |
| 78 kg | Patcharee Pichaipat; Thailand | Ruth Dugaduga; Philippines | Cliffia Sulistio; Indonesia |
| 78 kg | Patcharee Pichaipat; Thailand | Ruth Dugaduga; Philippines | Nguyễn Thi Anh Ngọc; Vietnam |
| +78 kg | Ira Purnamasari; Indonesia | Khin Myo Thu; Myanmar | Dinh Thi Diem Tuyen; Vietnam |
| +78 kg | Ira Purnamasari; Indonesia | Khin Myo Thu; Myanmar | Niramon Promtaeng; Thailand |
