= Sepak takraw at the 2005 SEA Games =

Sepak Takraw at the 2005 SEA Games
- Venue: USC Gymnasium
- Location: Cebu City, Cebu
- Date: November 27 – December 4

Sepak takraw at the 2005 SEA Games took place in the Gymnasium of the University of San Carlos in Cebu City, Philippines. The event was held from November 27 to December 4.

== Medal table ==
* Host nation (Philippines)

Rank	Nation	Gold	Silver	Bronze	Total
1	Myanmar	3	0	3	6
2	Thailand	2	2	2	6
3	Malaysia	1	0	1	2
4	Vietnam	0	2	0	2
5	Indonesia	0	1	5	6
6	Philippines*	0	1	1	2
Totals (6 entries)		6	6	12	24

== Medalists ==
=== Men ===
Event	Gold	Silver	Bronze
Double regu	Myanmar; Aung Cho Myint; Maung Maung; Si Thu Lin	Indonesia; Husni Uba; Jusri Pakke; Yudi Purnomo	Thailand; Pornchai Kaokaew; Suriyan Peachan; Rawat Parbchompoo
Double regu	Myanmar; Aung Cho Myint; Maung Maung; Si Thu Lin	Indonesia; Husni Uba; Jusri Pakke; Yudi Purnomo	Malaysia; Mohd Azlan; Mohd Saiful Nizam; Zulhafizazudin Rosslan
Regu	Malaysia; M Azman Nasrudin; M Normanizam Ahmad; M Putra Abdul Ghani; M Saifudin Hussin; M Zulkarnain Mohd Arif	Thailand; Pornchai Kaokaew; Prasert Pongpung; Sarawut Inlek; Suebsak Phunsueb; Suriyan Peachan	Myanmar; Aung Cho Myint; Aung Hein; Maung Maung; Si Thu Lin; Thein Zaw Min
Regu	Malaysia; M Azman Nasrudin; M Normanizam Ahmad; M Putra Abdul Ghani; M Saifudin Hussin; M Zulkarnain Mohd Arif	Thailand; Pornchai Kaokaew; Prasert Pongpung; Sarawut Inlek; Suebsak Phunsueb; Suriyan Peachan	Indonesia; Husni Uba; Jusri Pakke; Mohammad Nasrum; Wisnu Dwi Suhantoro; Yudi Purnomo
Hoop	Myanmar; Aung Hlaing Moe; Aung Hlaing Moe; Aung Zaw; Maung Maung Sein; Than Zaw Oo; Thein Zaw Min	Thailand; Ekachai Masuk; Rawat Parbchompoo; Saharat Wonumpai; Sarawut Inlek; Suriyan Peachan; Worapot Thongsai	Philippines; Danilo Alipan; Harrison Castañares; Hector Memarion; Joel Carbonilla; Metodio Suico; Michael Jose
Hoop	Myanmar; Aung Hlaing Moe; Aung Hlaing Moe; Aung Zaw; Maung Maung Sein; Than Zaw Oo; Thein Zaw Min	Thailand; Ekachai Masuk; Rawat Parbchompoo; Saharat Wonumpai; Sarawut Inlek; Suriyan Peachan; Worapot Thongsai	Indonesia; Edy Suwarno; Hadi Mulyono; Husni Uba; Muhammad Nasrum; Suko Hartono; Wisnu Dwi Suhantoro

=== Women ===
Event	Gold	Silver	Bronze
Double regu	Thailand; Areerat Takan; Payom Srihongsa; Tidawan Daosakul	Vietnam; Lê Thị Hạnh; Lưu Thị Thanh; Nguyễn Hải Thảo	Myanmar; Khin Cho Latt; Kyu Kyu Thinh; May Zin Phyoe
Double regu	Thailand; Areerat Takan; Payom Srihongsa; Tidawan Daosakul	Vietnam; Lê Thị Hạnh; Lưu Thị Thanh; Nguyễn Hải Thảo	Indonesia; Jumasiah; Mawarni Pilsora; Suriama
Regu	Thailand; Arrerat Takan; Narumon Sarakarn; Nitinadda Kaewkamsai; Payom Srihongsa; Tidawan Daosakul	Vietnam; Lưu Thị Thanh; Nguyễn Đức Thu Hiền; Nguyễn Hải Thảo; Nguyễn Thị Bích Thủy; Nguyễn Thịnh Thu Ba	Myanmar; Khin Cho Latt; Khin Nu Nu Phyoe; Kyu Kyu Thinh; Mar Mar Win; May Zin Phyoe
Regu	Thailand; Arrerat Takan; Narumon Sarakarn; Nitinadda Kaewkamsai; Payom Srihongsa; Tidawan Daosakul	Vietnam; Lưu Thị Thanh; Nguyễn Đức Thu Hiền; Nguyễn Hải Thảo; Nguyễn Thị Bích Thủy; Nguyễn Thịnh Thu Ba	Indonesia; Albertin Suryani; Jumasiah; Mawarni Pilsora; Mersi Pabarung; Suriama
Hoop	Myanmar; Khin Nu Nu Phyoe; Kyu Kyu Thinh; Mar Mar Win; May Zin Phyoe; Naing Naing Win; Soe Sint Sint Aung	Philippines; Deseree Autor; Eden Bernardo; Gelyn Evora; Irene Apdon; Rhea Padrigo; Sarah Catain	Thailand; Arrerat Takan; Chotika Boonthong; Nitinadda Kaewkamsai; Payom Srihongsa; Pinporn Klongbungkar; Varee Nantasing
Hoop	Myanmar; Khin Nu Nu Phyoe; Kyu Kyu Thinh; Mar Mar Win; May Zin Phyoe; Naing Naing Win; Soe Sint Sint Aung	Philippines; Deseree Autor; Eden Bernardo; Gelyn Evora; Irene Apdon; Rhea Padrigo; Sarah Catain	Indonesia; Albertin Suryani; Jumasiah; Mawarni Pilsora; Mersi Pabarung; Suriama; Wa Ode Daano
