= UPI =

UPI most commonly refers to:

- United Press International, a global news agency headquartered in Miami, Florida
- Unified Payments Interface, an Indian instant payment system

UPI may also refer to:

== Organizations ==
- Universal Pictures International, an American film studio
- Union of Italian Provinces (Italian: Unione delle Province d'Italia)
- Ural Polytechnic Institute, now Ural State Technical University, Russia
- Indonesia University of Education (Indonesian: Universitas Pendidikan Indonesia)
- Finnish Institute of International Affairs (Finnish: Ulkopoliittinen instituutti)

== Computing ==
- Intel Ultra Path Interconnect, a processor interconnect

== Financial services ==
- UnionPay, a Chinese payment cards company
- Unified Payments Interface, of National Payments Corporation of India

== Places ==
- Upi, Maguindanao del Norte, Philippines (also known as North Upi)
- South Upi, Maguindanao del Sur, Philippines
- Upi, an ancient indigenous settlement in Northwest Field (Guam)
- Upi or Upu, historic region surrounding Damascus

== Other uses ==
- Upi Darmayana Tamin (born 1970), Indonesian chess player
- Urpo Pikkupeura (born 1957), former Finnish skater
- Ulcer Performance Index, stock market risk measure
