= Triathlon at the 2005 SEA Games =

- Venue: Boardwalk
- Location: Subic Bay Freeport Zone, Olongapo City, Zambales
- Date: December 1–2

The Triathlon at the 2005 SEA Games was held at the Boardwalk, Subic Bay Freeport Zone, Zambales, Philippines on December 1 and 2. The participants are competing for individual gold medals in the men's and women's events.

The SEA Games distances for the three disciplines are:
Swimming - 1500 m
Road cycling - 40 km
Road running - 10 km

The events will run in sequence, so that the person who crossed the line in first place at the end of the run is declared the winner.

== Medalists ==
Event	Gold	Silver	Bronze
Men	Cheng Jing Hean; Singapore	Loh Yeong Shang; Malaysia	Arland Macasieb; Philippines
Women	Kimbeley Yap; Malaysia	Alessandra Araullo; Philippines	Alisa Ng Xinyi; Singapore

== Results ==
=== Women's triathlon (December 1, 2005) ===
Rank	#	Triathlete	Swimming	Cycling	Running	Total time
1st place, gold medalist(s)	5	Kimbeley Yap (MAS)	0:19:04.02	1:10:36.89	0:44:58.69	2:14:39.60
2nd place, silver medalist(s)	6	Alessandra Araullo (PHI)	0:22:40.52	1:09:35.47	0:43:43.88	2:15:59.87
3rd place, bronze medalist(s)	3	Alisa Ng Xinyi (SIN)	0:22:44.49	1:15:34.02	0:43:38.98	2:21:57.49
4	4	Ani Karina De Leon (PHI)	0:22:39.32	1:09:38.01	0:53:00.08	2:25:17.41
5	2	Songsiri Phocharoen (THA)	0:22:42.32	1:12:25.31	0:50:32.53	2:25:40.16
6	1	Elaine Chan Mei Xian (SIN)	0:22:49.33	1:15:31.19	0:51:07.84	2:29:28.36

=== Men's triathlon (December 2, 2005) ===
Rank	#	Triathlete	Swimming	Cycling	Running	Total time
1st place, gold medalist(s)	4	Cheng Jing Hean (SIN)	0:18:33.91	1:02:02.28	0:38:04.95	1:58:41.14
2nd place, silver medalist(s)	6	Loh Yeong Shang (MAS)	0:20:33.07	1:04:47.62	0:36:51.94	2:02:12.63
3rd place, bronze medalist(s)	9	Arland Macasieb (PHI)	0:20:43.84	1:04:26.38	0:39:20.18	2:04:30.40
4	2	Gino Ernest Ng (SIN)	0:20:36.79	1:04:38.85	0:40:26.54	2:05:42.18
5	8	Noel Salvador (PHI)	0:20:34.13	1:04:04.06	0:41:34.31	2:06:12.50
6	1	Amnat Srihat (THA)	0:25:45.95	1:06:01.33	0:36:26.09	2:08:13.37
7	7	Wuttipat Bungjang (THA)	0:23:27.56	1:08:02.80	0:40:59.55	2:12:29.91
8	5	Khin Maung Thant (MYA)	0:20:41.56	1:11:01.02	0:51:23.50	2:23:06.08
9	3	Thet Paing Toe (MYA)	0:20:42.60	1:15:17.52	0:58:36.62	2:34:36.74
