= Sailing at the 2005 SEA Games =

- Venue: Subic Bay Yacht Club
- Location: Subic Bay Freeport Zone, Olongapo City, Zambales
- Date: November 26 – December 2

Sailing at the 2005 SEA Games took place at the Subic Bay Yacht Club, Subic Bay Freeport Zone, Zambales, Philippines. Twelve gold medals were contested. The event was scheduled to be held from November 26 to December 4, but wind conditions led to the organisers bringing the races forward to conclude the events by December 2.

== Medal table ==
* Host nation (Philippines)

Rank	Nation	Gold	Silver	Bronze	Total
1	Singapore (SIN)	7	3	1	11
2	Thailand (THA)	2	1	8	11
3	Malaysia (MAS)	1	3	0	4
3	Myanmar (MYA)	1	3	0	4
5	Philippines (PHI)*	1	1	3	5
6	Indonesia (INA)	0	1	0	1
Totals (6 entries)		12	12	12	36

== Medalists ==
=== Men & boys ===
Event	Gold	Silver	Bronze
RS:X	German Paz; Philippines	I Gusti Made Oka Sulaksana; Indonesia	Suhaimee Moohammadkasem; Thailand
Formula	Phanutthat Ruamsap; Thailand	Reneric Moreno; Philippines	Tan Wearn Haw; Singapore
Optimist	Alvin Yeow Jian Shing; Malaysia	Sean Lee Teik Ren; Singapore	Navee Thamsoontorn; Thailand
Laser	Maximillian Soh Khyan Tat; Singapore	Mohamed Romzi Mahamad; Malaysia	Manat Phothong; Thailand
420	Singapore; Teo Wee Chin; Terence Koh	Myanmar; Nay La Kyaw; Min Min	Thailand; Paradon Chuasanga; Krisanasak Phibun
470	Myanmar; Maung Aung Myin Thu; Sai Pyae Sone Hein	Singapore; Roy Tay Jun Hao; Chung Pei Ming	Philippines; Ridgely Balladares; Rommel Chavez

=== Women & girls ===
Event	Gold	Silver	Bronze
Optimist	Griselda Khng; Singapore	Rufina Tan; Malaysia	Benjamas Poonpat; Thailand
Laser Radial	Lo Man Yi; Singapore	Tiffany Koo Yee Chin; Malaysia	Sinsupa Wannasuth; Thailand
420	Singapore; Siobhan Tam Shiu Wun; Dawn Liu Xiaodan	Myanmar; Su Sandar Wai; Zin April Aung	Thailand; Duanghathai Booncherd; Janjira Meesap
470	Singapore; Toh Liying; Tok Lee Ching	Myanmar; Saw Sue Myat Soe; New New San	Thailand; Wandee Vongtim; Yupa Sunnawat

=== Open & mixed ===
Event	Gold	Silver	Bronze
420	Singapore; Xu Yuan Zhen; Justin Wong Ming Ho	Thailand; Wiwat Poonpat; Kitipong Khambang	Philippines; Rafael Buitre; Richly Magsanay
Hobie 16	Thailand; Damrongsak Vongtim; Sakda Vongtim	Singapore; Melcom Huang Jinjie; Chung Pei Quan	Philippines; Louie Perfectua; Mark Gil Francisco

== Events ==
=== 420 Men's Open ===
Rank	Helm	Crew	Race										Total	Nett
Rank	Helm	Crew	1	2	3	4	5	6	7	8	9	10	Total	Nett
1	(Singapore) Xu Yuan Zhen	Wong Ming Ho Justin	1	1	1	~~2~~	1	2	~~3~~	2	1	1	15	10
2	(Thailand) Wiwat Poonpat	Kitipong Khambang	~~4~~	3	3	1	2	1	1	1	~~4~~	2	22	14
3	(Philippines) Rafael Buitre	Richly Magsanay	2	2	2	~~4~~	~~4~~	4	2	3	2	3	28	20
4	(Myanmar) Yan Myo Aung	Zaw One	3	~~4~~	4	3	3	3	4	~~5~~ ^{1}	3	4	36	27

^{1}) Disqualified.

=== 420 Boy's ===
Rank	Helm	Crew	Race										Total	Nett
Rank	Helm	Crew	1	2	3	4	5	6	7	8	9	10	Total	Nett
1	(Singapore) Teo Wee Chin	Terence Koh	2	1	1	2	~~6~~ ^{1}	1	~~5~~	2	1	1	22	11
2	(Myanmar) Nay La Kyaw	Min Min	~~4~~	3	2	3	1	2	1	1	2	~~4~~	23	15
3	(Thailand) Paradon Chuasanga	Krisanasak Phibun	1	~~6~~ ^{1}	~~6~~ ^{1}	1	2	3	2	5	3	3	32	20
4	(Philippines) Emerson Villena	Lester Troy Tayong	3	2	3	4	4	4	3	3	~~5~~	~~5~~	36	26
5	(Indonesia) Murhadi bin Usman	Setiyawan bin Jazari	~~5~~	4	4	~~5~~	3	5	4	4	4	2	40	30

^{1}) Disqualified.

=== 470 Men's ===
Rank	Helm	Crew	Race										Total	Nett
Rank	Helm	Crew	1	2	3	4	5	6	7	8	9	10	Total	Nett
1	(Myanmar) Maung Aung Myin Thu	Sai Pyae Sone Hein	2	1	2	2	~~3~~	~~4~~	1	3	1	3	14	14
2	(Singapore) Tay Jun Hao Roy	Chung Pei Ming	1	~~4~~	3	3	2	2	2	1	3	~~4~~	25	17
3	(Philippines) Ridgely Balladares	Rommel Chavez	3	3	~~4~~	1	1	1	3	4	~~5~~ ^{1}	2	27	8
4	(Thailand) Teerapong Watiboonruang	Pongwichean	~~4~~	2	1	~~4~~	4	3	4	2	2	1	27	19

^{1}) Disqualified.

=== Hobie 16 Men's ===
Rank	Helm	Crew	Race										Total	Nett
Rank	Helm	Crew	1	2	3	4	5	6	7	8	9	10	Total	Nett
1	(Thailand) Damrongsak Vongtim	Sakda Vongtim	~~2~~	1	~~2~~	2	1	1	1	1	1	1	13	9
2	(Singapore) Chong Pei Quan	Huang Jinjie Melcom	1	~~2~~	1	1	~~2~~	2	2	2	2	2	17	13
3	(Philippines) Louie Perfectua	Mark Gil Francisco	~~3~~	~~3~~	3	3	3	3	3	3	3	3	30	24
