= Cycling at the 2005 SEA Games =

Cycling (Track) at the 2005 SEA Games
- Venue: Amoranto Velodrome
- Location: Quezon City, Metro Manila
- Start date: December 3, 2005
- End date: December 3, 2005

Cycling (Criterium) at the 2005 SEA Games
- Venue: Roxas Boulevard
- Location: Manila
- Start date: December 4, 2005
- End date: December 4, 2005

Cycling (Road) at the 2005 SEA Games
- Venue: Tagaytay People's Park
- Location: Tagaytay, Cavite
- Start date: November 30, 2005
- End date: December 3, 2005

Cycling (Mountain) at the 2005 SEA Games
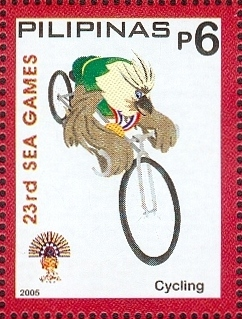
- Logo of cycling at the 2005 SEA Games on a 2005 stamp of the Philippines
- Venue: Hills of Cebu - Durano Sports Complex
- Location: Danao, Cebu
- Start date: November 28, 2005
- End date: November 29, 2005

Cycling at the 2005 SEA Games was split into four categories:

- Track, held at the Amoranto Velodrome in Quezon City, Metro Manila, Philippines.
- Criterium, held on Roxas Boulevard, Manila
- Road, held on the streets of Tagaytay, Cavite, Philippines.
- Mountain, held at the Ramon M. Durano Sports Complex, Danao, Cebu, Philippines.

== Results ==
* Host nation (Philippines)

Rank	Nation	Gold	Silver	Bronze	Total
1	Indonesia (INA)	4	3	3	10
2	Malaysia (MAS)	4	2	1	7
3	Philippines (PHI)	2	4	3	9
4	Vietnam (VIE)	2	0	3	5
5	Thailand (THA)	0	3	2	5
Totals (5 entries)		12	12	12	36

=== Track Racing ===
Men's

Event	Gold	Silver	Bronze
4 km. Individual Pursuit	Alfie Catalan (Philippines); 4:59:51	Amiruddin Jamaluddin (Malaysia); 5:00:02	Suwandra (Indonesia); 5:07:78
4 km. Team Pursuit	Malaysia	Philippines	Indonesia
4 km. Team Sprint	Malaysia	Indonesia	Philippines

=== Criterium ===
Men's

Gold	Silver	Bronze
Samai (Indonesia); 22 points	Manan Anuar (Malaysia); 18 points	Youthaporn Hunthao (Thailand); 15 points

=== Road ===
Event	Gold	Silver	Bronze
Men's Individual; Time Trial	Mai Cong Hieu (Vietnam); 1:05:12.79	Tonton Susanto (Indonesia) +00:00:38.09	Shahrulneza Razalli (Malaysia) +00:02:20.52
Women's Individual; Time Trial	Santia Tri Kusuma (Indonesia); 01:09:34.62	Baby Marites Bitbit (Philippines) +00:00:18.47	Nguyen Thi Hoang Oanh (Vietnam) +00:00:25.7
Men's Massed; Start Race	Suhardi Hassan (Malaysia); 05:02:45.6	Samai (Indonesia) +00:00:00.01	Trinh Phat Dat (Vietnam) +00:00:00.10
Women's Massed; Start Race	Noor Azian Alias (Malaysia); 02:47:49.26	Chanpeng Nontasin (Thailand) +00:00:02.67	Monrudee Chapookam (Thailand) +00:00:05.93

=== Mountain ===
Event	Gold	Silver	Bronze
Men's Downhill	Wisit Phuengnoi (Indonesia); 2:36.14	Joey Barba (Philippines)	Michael Borja (Philippines)
Women's Downhill	Phan Thi Thuy Trang (Vietnam); 3:08.30	Sattayanun Abdulkaree (Thailand) +00:11.05	Risa Suseanty (Indonesia) +00:14.11
Men's Cross; Country MTB	Nurcahyadi Dadi (Indonesia); 2:18.48	Frederick Feliciano (Philippines) +00:02.63	Eusedio Quinones (Philippines) +00:04.89
Women's Cross; Country MTB	Baby Marites Bitbit (Philippines); 1:49.55	Jantharat Jirapon (Thailand) +00:03.86	Nguyen Thanh Dam (Vietnam) +00:11.65

Preceded by 2003	Cycling at the SEA Games; 2005 SEA Games	Succeeded by 2007
