= Traditional boat race at the SEA Games =

Traditional boat race is a Southeast Asian Games sport since the 1993 edition, with an exception in 1999, 2001 and in 2009, the traditional boat race not held.

== Medal summary ==
=== Medal table ===
Rank	Nation	Gold	Silver	Bronze	Total
1	Philippines (PHI)	7	3	1	11
2	Myanmar (MYA)	3	5	2	10
3	Indonesia (INA)	1	2	6	9
4	Vietnam (VIE)	1	1	0	2
5	Thailand (THA)	0	1	1	2
Totals (5 entries)		12	12	10	34

== Medalists ==
=== Men ===
==== 500m(10 crews) ====
Year	Location	Gold	Silver	Bronze
2003	Hanoi	Philippines	Myanmar	?
2005	Manila	Philippines	Myanmar	Indonesia
2007	Nakhon Ratchasima	Myanmar	Philippines	Thailand
2009	Vientiane	Not held		

==== 500m(20 crews) ====
Year	Location	Gold	Silver	Bronze
2003	Hanoi	Not held		
2005	Manila	Philippines	Myanmar	Indonesia
2007	Nakhon Ratchasima	Not held		
2009	Vientiane	Not held		

==== 1000m(10 crews) ====
Year	Location	Gold	Silver	Bronze
2003	Hanoi	?	?	?
2005	Manila	Philippines	Indonesia	Myanmar
2007	Nakhon Ratchasima	Myanmar	Philippines	Indonesia
2009	Vientiane	Not held		

==== 1000m(20 crews) ====
Year	Location	Gold	Silver	Bronze
2003	Hanoi	Not held		
2005	Manila	Philippines	Myanmar	Indonesia
2007	Nakhon Ratchasima	Not held		
2009	Vientiane	Not held		

=== Women ===
==== 500m(10 crews) ====
Year	Location	Gold	Silver	Bronze
2003	Hanoi	Vietnam	?	?
2005	Manila	Philippines	Myanmar	Indonesia
2007	Nakhon Ratchasima	Myanmar	Philippines	Indonesia
2009	Vientiane	Not held		

==== 1000m(10 crews) ====
Year	Location	Gold	Silver	Bronze
2003	Hanoi	?	Vietnam	?
2005	Manila	Philippines	Indonesia	Myanmar
2007	Nakhon Ratchasima	Indonesia	Thailand	Philippines
2009	Vientiane	Not held		
