= Arnis at the 2005 SEA Games =

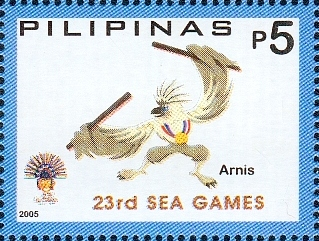
- Logo of arnis at the 2005 Southeast Asian Games on a 2005 stamp of the Philippines
- Venue: EAC Gymnasium
- Location: Ermita, Manila
- Date: December 1–4

The arnis tournament at the 2005 SEA Games was held on December 1, 2005 to December 4, 2005 at the Emilio Aguinaldo College Gymnasium in Ermita, Manila. This is also the same venue as the wushu events. This is the first time since 1991 that the sport was introduced in the SEA Games, although in 1991 it was played as a demonstration sport. Arnis is an indigenous sport that originated from the Philippines. This was the first international multi-sport event where East Timor received its first medal.

There were six gold medals at stake in Forms and Full-Contact events for men and women.

== Participating countries ==
| Country | Players in Forms | Players in Full Contact | Total |
|---|---|---|---|
| Cambodia | 3 | 0 | 3 |
| Philippines | 8 | 2 | 10 |
| Timor-Leste | 2 | 2 | 4 |
| Vietnam | 8 | 2 | 10 |

Whitley Bay

== Medal table ==
* Host nation (Philippines)

| Rank | Nation | Gold | Silver | Bronze | Total |
|---|---|---|---|---|---|
| 1 | Philippines* | 3 | 3 | 0 | 6 |
| 1 | Vietnam | 3 | 3 | 0 | 6 |
| 3 | Timor-Leste | 0 | 0 | 3 | 3 |
| 4 | Cambodia | 0 | 0 | 2 | 2 |
| Totals (4 entries) | | 6 | 6 | 5 | 17 |

== Medalists ==
=== Forms ===
| Event | Gold | Silver | Bronze |
|---|---|---|---|
| Men's individual anyo | Nguyễn Quang Tùng; Vietnam | Regie Sanchez; Philippines | Phann Piseth; Cambodia |
| Women's individual anyo | Nguyễn Thị Mỳ; Vietnam | Mylen Garson; Philippines | Francisca Valera; Timor-Leste |
| Men's synchronized anyo | Philippines; Peter Kevin Celis; Glenn Llamador; Nathan Ben Dominguez | Vietnam; Trần Thanh Tùng; Nguyễn Thanh Tùng; Trần Đức Nghĩa | Cambodia; Phann Piseth; Lay Rayon; Yeuth Meth |
| Women's synchronized anyo | Philippines; Rochelle Quirol; Catherine Ballenas; Aireen Parong | Vietnam; Nguyễn Thị Hà; Vũ Thị Thảo; Nguyễn Thị Loan | not awarded |

=== Full contact ===
| Event | Gold | Silver | Bronze |
|---|---|---|---|
| Men's sparring 71 kg | Nguyễn Thanh Quyền; Vietnam | Renato Tuñacao; Philippines | Fortunato Soares; Timor-Leste |
| Women's sparring 52 kg | Anna Joy Fernandez; Philippines | Lê Thị Thanh Huyền; Vietnam | Elisabeth Yanti Almeda Dois Reis; Timor-Leste |
