= Weightlifting at the 2005 SEA Games =

- Venue: Luxur Place
- Location: Bacolod, Negros Occidental
- Date: 1–4 December

Weightlifting at the 2005 SEA Games was held in the Luxur Place in Bacolod, Negros Occidental, Philippines.

== Medal table ==
* Host nation (Philippines)

Rank	Nation	Gold	Silver	Bronze	Total
1	Thailand	6	2	0	8
2	Indonesia	2	3	1	6
3	Myanmar	1	2	1	4
4	Malaysia	1	0	1	2
5	Vietnam	0	2	4	6
6	Philippines*	0	1	3	4
Totals (6 entries)		10	10	10	30

== Medalists ==
=== Men ===
Event	Gold		Silver		Bronze	
69 kg	Misdan Yunip; Indonesia	306 kg (141+165)	Ronnayuth Amnoiwong; Thailand	296 kg (127+269)	Muhamad Hamidon; Malaysia	285 kg (125+160)
85 kg	Sandow Weldemar Nasution; Indonesia	334 kg (146+188)	Kraison Dadtuyawat; Thailand	318 kg (137+181)	Lưu Văn Thắng; Vietnam	305 kg (135+170)
94 kg	Khunchai Nuchpum; Thailand	346 kg (155+191)	Aldonsito Aldanete; Philippines	300 kg (132+168)	Vu Hong Phong; Vietnam	298 kg (131+167)
105 kg	Suthipon Wathanakasikam; Thailand	346 kg (156+190)	Reynaldi Saenal; Indonesia	336 kg (148+188)	Renante Briones; Philippines	323 kg (145+178)
+105 kg	Che Mod Azrol Che Mat; Malaysia	350 kg (160+190)	Dedi Apriyanto; Indonesia	336 kg (151+185)	Alvin de los Santos; Philippines	325 kg (140+185)

=== Women ===
Event	Gold		Silver		Bronze	
48 kg	Thongyim Bhunphitak; Thailand	197 kg (90+107)	Kyi Kyi Than; Myanmar	193 kg (83+110)	Nguyễn Thị Bích Hà; Vietnam	183 kg (80+103)
58 kg	Junpim Kuntatean; Thailand	228 kg (102+126)	Raema Lisa Rumbewas; Indonesia	216 kg (96+120)	Shwe Sin Win; Myanmar	212 kg (90+122)
63 kg	Wandee Kameaim; Thailand	230 kg (100+130)	Nguyễn Thị Thiết; Vietnam	222 kg (102+120)	Cecilia Atilano; Philippines	187 kg (87+100)
69 kg	Pawina Thongsuk; Thailand	257 kg (115+142)	Yar Thet Pan; Myanmar	232 kg (100+132)	Khuất Minh Hải; Vietnam	215 kg (95+120)
75 kg	Mya Sanda Oo; Myanmar	240 kg (107+133)	Nguyễn Thị Phương Loan; Vietnam	231 kg (103+128)	Ni Luh Sinta Darmariani; Indonesia	228 kg (99+129)

== Games Records ==
- Men – 85 kg: Indonesia' Sandow Weldemar Nasution, Score:334 (146-188)

(previous record of ?)

- Women – 63 kg.: Thailand's Wanee Kameaim, Score:230 (100-130)

(previous record of ?)

- Men – 94 kg.: Thailand's' Khunchai Nuchpum, Score:346 (155-191)

(previous record of ?)

- Women – 69 kg: Thailand's' Pawina Thongsuk, Score:257 (115-142)

(previous record of ?)

- Women - 75 kg: Myanmar's' Mya Sanda Oo, Score:240(107-133)

(previous record of 232.5 (102.5-130) was set in 2003 Myanmar's Cho Cho Win)

- Men - 105+ kg.: Malaysia's' Che Mod Azrol Che Mat, Score:350 (160*-190)

(previous record of 155 was set in 2003 Thailand's Nupadol Wandwang)
