= Equestrian at the 2005 SEA Games =

Equestrian at the 2005 Southeast Asian Games
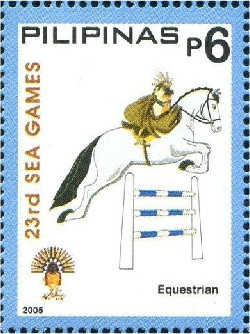
- Logo of equestrian at the 2005 Southeast Asian Games on a 2005 stamp of the Philippines
- Venue: Alabang Country Club
- Location: Alabang, Muntinlupa, Metro Manila
- Date: November 30 – December 4

The events of the Equestrian at the 2005 Southeast Asian Games featured the equestrian discipline jumping. The discipline was divided into individual and team contests. It was the only event open to all genders.

The events were held at the Alabang Country Club, on the suburb area of Muntinlupa, Metro Manila, Philippines.

== Medal table ==
* Host nation (Philippines)

Rank	Nation	Gold	Silver	Bronze	Total
1	Philippines (PHI)*	1	1	1	3
2	Malaysia (MAS)	1	1	0	2
3	Thailand (THA)	0	0	1	1
Totals (3 entries)		2	2	2	6

== Medalists ==
Event	Gold	Silver	Bronze
Individual jumping	Malaysia; Qabil Ambak on Camelias	Philippines; Toni Leviste on Globe Platinum Maktub	Philippines; Juan Ramon Lanza on Don't Cry for Me
Team jumping	Philippines; Joker Arroyo on Without a Doubt; Mikee Cojuangco-Jaworski on Globe Platinum Leap of Faith; Juan Ramon Lanza on Don't Cry for Me; Toni Leviste on Globe Platinum Maktub	Malaysia; Syed Omar Al-Mohdzar on Cora; Qabil Ambak on Camelias; Quzier Ambak on Calano; Lea Tan on La-Bonita 2	Thailand; Nagone Kamolsiri on Late Black Sun; Sira Konglapamnuay on Amber; Dhewin Manathanya on Nairobi; Varat Ngowabunpat on Luxor 91
