= Golf at the 2005 SEA Games =

- Venue: The Country Club
- Location: Canlubang, Santa Rosa, Laguna
- Date: 1–4 December 2005

Golf at the 2005 SEA Games took place at The Country Club in Santa Rosa, Laguna, Philippines. The men's events were held from 1 to 4 December, while the women's events were held from 2 to 4 December.

== Summary ==
The medal summary is based on the official final results for the four golf events.

* Host nation (Philippines)

Rank	Nation	Gold	Silver	Bronze	Total
1	Philippines (PHI)*	2	2	0	4
2	Thailand (THA)	2	1	1	4
3	Singapore (SIN)	0	1	1	2
4	Indonesia (INA)	0	0	1	1
4	Myanmar (MYA)	0	0	1	1
Totals (5 entries)		4	4	4	12

== Medal winners ==
Event	Gold	Silver	Bronze
Men's individual	Juvic Pagunsan; Philippines	Ekalak Waisayakul; Thailand	Choo Tze Huang; Singapore
Men's team	Philippines; Juvic Pagunsan; Jay Bayron; Michael Eric Bibat; Marvin Dumandan	Singapore; Quek Peng Xiang; Leong Kit Wai; Goh Kun Yang; Choo Tze Huang	Myanmar; Bo Bo; Aung Win; Zaw Zin Win; Thein Zaw Myint
Women's individual	Nontaya Srisawang; Thailand	Jayvie Marie Agojo; Philippines	Sukintorn Saensradi; Thailand
Women's team	Thailand; Nontaya Srisawang; Sukintorn Saensradi; Suteera Chanachai	Philippines; Jayvie Marie Agojo; Frances Noelle Bondad; Ana Imelda Tanpinco	Indonesia; Lidia Ivina Jaya; Juriah; Risti Yuinda Putri
