= Lisa Karlina Lumongdong =

Indonesian chess player (born 1968)

Personal information
- Born: 23 July 1968 (age 57)

Chess career
- Country: Indonesia
- Title: Woman International Master (1992)
- Peak rating: 2163 (January 2004)

Lisa Karlina Lumongdong (born 23 July 1968) is an Indonesian chess player who holds the title of Woman International Master (WIM). She is a two-times Indonesian Women's Chess Championship winner (1994, 2005).

== Biography ==
She twice won Indonesian Women's Chess Championship: in 1994 and 2005. In 1993, Lisa Karlina Lumongdong participated in Women's World Chess Championship Interzonal Tournament in Jakarta where ranked 34th place. She represented Indonesia in Women's Asian Team Chess Championship in 1995. In 2005, she won the bronze medal in Women's Standard Chess Team tournament in the Southeast Asian Games.

Lisa Karlina Lumongdong played for Indonesia in the Women's Chess Olympiads:

- In 1988, at first reserve board in the 28th Chess Olympiad (women) in Thessaloniki (+4, =3, -4),
- In 1990, at second board in the 29th Chess Olympiad (women) in Novi Sad (+2, =3, -3),
- In 1992, at first board in the 30th Chess Olympiad (women) in Manila (+2, =5, -7),
- In 1994, at first board in the 31st Chess Olympiad (women) in Moscow (+2, =3, -3),
- In 1996, at third board in the 32nd Chess Olympiad (women) in Yerevan (+5, =4, -3).

In 1992, she awarded the FIDE Woman International Master (WIM) title.
