= Subic Bay Sports Complex =

- Remy Field Sports Complex
- Subic Gymnasium
- Interactive map of Subic Bay Sports Complex
- Location: Subic Freeport Zone, Olongapo, Zambales, Philippines
- Coordinates: 14°49′21.6″N 120°17′00.6″E
- Owner: Subic Bay Metropolitan Authority
- Type: Sports complex
- Facilities: Remy Field Track Oval; Subic Gymnasium; Subic International Tennis Center; Subic Bay Sand Courts

Construction
- Renovated: 2019
- Expanded: 2003

The Subic Bay Sports Complex, also known as the Remy Field Sports Complex, is a group of sports facilities at the Subic Freeport Zone in the Philippines.

== History ==
The Remy Field area which would later be called as the Subic Bay Sports Complex has been used as for sporting purposes as early as the 1990s.

In April 27, 2002, the Subic International Tennis Center was inaugurated which was also the opening day of the inaugural Coca-Cola National Tennis Championships of the Philippine Tennis Association. It was built at the cost of ₱27 million. It had seven courts.

The Remy Baseball Field was the venue of the archery competition of the 2005 SEA Games.

The Subic Bay Sports Complex underwent major renovations ahead of the 2019 SEA Games with changes made to the Remy Field Track Oval and the Subic Gymnasium. The Subic Bay Sand Courts was also installed.

== Facilities ==
The sports venues along Aguinaldo Street is collectively called the Subic Bay Sports Complex, and is sometimes called the Remy Field Sports Complex.

The stadium is called the Remy Field Track Oval, which has an athletics track and pitch which can be used for American football or association football. It covers an area of 6,300 square meters (68,000 sq ft). Prior to the 2019 renovation which expanded the bleachers and added some roofing, Remy Field had a seating capacity of 7,000.

The Subic Gymnasium is the indoor arena of the sports complex and can host indoor sports like basketball. Records in 2010 states the gymnasium had a seating capacity of 1,300.

The Subic International Tennis Center serves as a venue for tennis and badminton.

The complex previously had a baseball diamond.
