= Lo Man Yi =

Singaporean sailor (born 1988)

Personal information
- Full name: Lo Man Yi
- Nationality: Singapore
- Born: 12 March 1988 (age 38) Singapore
- Height: 1.64 m (5 ft 4 1/2 in)
- Weight: 57 kg (126 lb)

Sailing career
- Sport: Sailing
- Club: Singapore Sailing Federation
- Coached by: Brett Beyer (AUS)
- Class: Dinghy
Medal record
Women's sailing
Representing Singapore
Southeast Asian Games
Gold medal – first place	2005 Manila	Laser Radial

Lo Man Yi (born 12 March 1988) is a Singaporean former sailor, who specialized in the Laser Radial class. She captured the gold medal in her signature boat at the 2005 Southeast Asian Games in Manila, Philippines and eventually represented Singapore at the 2008 Summer Olympics. Lo trained throughout her sporting career for the Singapore Sailing Federation, under the tutelage of her personal coach Brett Beyer, a six-time Laser Apprentice Master world champion from Australia.

Lo competed for the Singaporean sailing squad, as a 20-year-old, in the inaugural Laser Radial class at the 2008 Summer Olympics in Beijing. A few months earlier, she was selected over the quota recipient Elizabeth Yin to lock the country's top Laser Radial spot for the Games, based on her performance in a series of international regattas approved by the Singapore Sailing Federation. Lo endured most of the races with mediocre scores, before finding her solace to beat the rest of the sailors for the third spot on the last leg. Lo's best result, however, was not enough to excel her towards the top of the scoreboard, sitting her in the twenty-fifth position with a net grade of 148.
