= Chess at the 2005 SEA Games =

Chess at the 2005 Southeast Asian Games
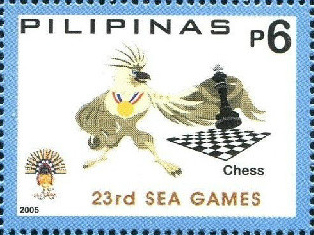
- Logo of chess at the 2005 Southeast Asian Games on a 2005 stamp of the Philippines
- Venue: Tagaytay City Convention Center
- Location: Tagaytay, Cavite
- Date: November 27 – December 5

Chess at the 2005 Southeast Asian Games took place at the Tagaytay City Convention Center in Tagaytay, Cavite, Philippines.

Chess is not one of the Olympic Games events but is included in the Southeast Asian Games.

== Summary ==
* Host nation (Philippines)

Rank	Nation	Gold	Silver	Bronze	Total
1	Vietnam (VIE)	8	2	2	12
2	Philippines (PHI)*	0	4	3	7
3	Indonesia (INA)	0	2	3	5
4	Singapore (SIN)	0	0	3	3
5	Myanmar (MYA)	0	0	1	1
Totals (5 entries)		8	8	12	28

== Medalists ==
=== Men ===
Event	Gold	Silver	Bronze
Blitz	Nguyễn Anh Dũng; Vietnam	Oliver Dimakiling; Philippines	Rogelio Antonio Jr. Philippines
Blitz	Nguyễn Anh Dũng; Vietnam	Oliver Dimakiling; Philippines	Nguyễn Ngọc Trường Sơn; Vietnam
Rapid	Nguyễn Ngọc Trường Sơn; Vietnam	Susanto Megaranto; Indonesia	Eugenio Torre; Philippines
Rapid	Nguyễn Ngọc Trường Sơn; Vietnam	Susanto Megaranto; Indonesia	Jason Goh Koon-Jong; Singapore
Standard	Nguyễn Ngọc Trường Sơn; Vietnam	Lê Quang Liêm; Vietnam	Goh Wei Ming; Singapore
Rapid team	Vietnam; Nguyễn Anh Dũng; Nguyễn Ngọc Trường Sơn; Từ Hoàng Thông; Lê Quang Liêm; Dương Thế Anh	Philippines; Eugenio Torre; Rogelio Antonio Jr. Nelson Mariano II; Petronio Roca; Barlo Nadera	Singapore; Wong Meng Kong; Wu Shaobin; Jason Goh Koon-Jong; Goh Wei Ming
Standard team	Vietnam; Nguyễn Ngọc Trường Sơn; Lê Quang Liêm; Nguyễn Anh Dũng; Đinh Đức Trọng	Philippines; Eugenio Torre; Rogelio Antonio Jr. Oliver Barbosa; Ronald Dableo	Indonesia; Susanto Megaranto; Edhi Handoko; Taufik Halay; Tirto

=== Women ===
Event	Gold	Silver	Bronze
Blitz	Nguyễn Quỳnh Anh; Vietnam	Evi Lindiawati; Indonesia	Catherine Perena; Philippines
Blitz	Nguyễn Quỳnh Anh; Vietnam	Evi Lindiawati; Indonesia	Hoàng Thị Bảo Trâm; Vietnam
Standard	Nguyễn Thị Thanh An; Vietnam	Lê Thanh Tú; Vietnam	Lisa Karlina Lumongdong; Indonesia
Standard team	Vietnam; Hoàng Thị Bảo Trâm; Nguyễn Thị Thanh An; Lê Thanh Tú; Trần Thị Kim Loan	Philippines; Sheerie Joy Lomibao; Beverly Mendoza; Enerose Magno; Shercila Cua	Indonesia; Lisa Karlina Lumongdong; Evi Lindiawati; Irine Kharisma Sukandar; Upi Darmayana Tamin
