= Archery at the 2005 SEA Games =

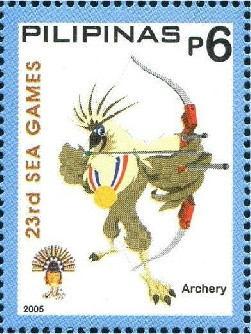
- Logo of archery at the 2005 Southeast Asian Games on a 2005 stamp of the Philippines
- Venue: Remy Baseball Field
- Location: Subic Bay Freeport Zone, Olongapo City, Zambales
- Date: November 28 – December 4

Archery at the 2005 SEA Games was held at the Remy Baseball Field in Subic Bay Freeport Zone, Zambales, Philippines. The archery schedule began on November 28 and ended on December 4.

There were eight gold medals contested, with individual and team events for men and the same for women.

This was the first year that the compound archery category was introduced at the SEA Games.

Ranking rounds were done using a FITA round (now known as the 1440 round). The score from that round determined the match-ups in the elimination rounds, with high-ranking archers facing low-ranking archers.

Matchplay at the SEA Games was done from a range of 70 meters. The target's total diameter was 122 cm. An archer had 40 seconds to fire each arrow. Each National Olympic Committee being able to enter a maximum of three archers. Each archer fired six ends, or groups, of 12 arrows per end in the ranking round. There were three rounds of elimination that used six ends of three arrows, narrowing the field of archers to 32, then to 16, then to 8. The three final rounds (quarterfinals, semifinals, and medal matches) each used four ends of three arrows.

The teams consisted of the country's three archers from the individual round, and the team's initial ranking was determined by summing the three members' scores in the individual ranking round. Each round of eliminations consisted of each team firing 27 arrows (9 by each archer).

== Medal tally ==
* Host nation (Philippines)

Rank	Nation	Gold	Silver	Bronze	Total
1	Philippines*	3	2	2	7
2	Malaysia	3	2	1	6
3	Indonesia	1	4	1	6
4	Myanmar	1	0	3	4
5	Singapore	0	0	1	1
Totals (5 entries)		8	8	8	24

== Medalists ==
=== Recurve ===
Event	Gold	Silver	Bronze
Men's individual	Zaw Win Htike; Myanmar	Wan Khalmizam; Malaysia	Marvin Cordero; Philippines
Women's individual	Rina Dewi Puspitasari; Indonesia	Yasmidar Hamid; Indonesia	Rachelle Anne Cabral; Philippines
Men's team	Philippines; Christian Cubilla; Florante Matan; Mark Javier	Indonesia; Hendro Suprianto; Lockoneco; Rahmat Sulistiyawan	Malaysia; Cheng Chu Sian; Muhammad Marbawi Sulaiman; Wan Khalmizam
Women's team	Malaysia; Annabarasi Subramaniam; Mon Redee Sut Txi; Siti Sholeha Yusof	Indonesia; Novia Nuraini; Rina Dewi Puspitasari; Yasmidar Hamid	Myanmar; Aung Ngeain; Nang Mo Hwom; San Yu Htwe

=== Compound ===
Event	Gold	Silver	Bronze
Men's individual	Lang Hon Keong; Malaysia	Ting Leong Fong; Malaysia	I Gusti Nyoman Puruhito; Indonesia
Women's individual	Amaya Paz; Philippines	Jennifer Chan; Philippines	Maryanne Gul; Singapore
Men's team	Malaysia; Lang Hon Keong; Soo Teck Kim; Ting Leong Fong	Philippines; Adam Jimenez III; Earl Benjamin Yap; Gil Gabriel	Myanmar; Myo Aung San; U Paw Oo; Ye Min Swe
Women's team	Philippines; Abigail Tindugan; Amaya Paz; Jennifer Chan	Indonesia; Foury Akadiani Kusumaniah; Lilies Handayani; Lilies Heliarti	Myanmar; Kay Thi; Tin Zin Ei; Yu Nandar Htike
