= The Country Club (Philippines) =

Golf course in Cavite, Philippines

- Interactive map of The Country Club
- 14°13′43.6″N 121°04′19.0″E

Club information
- Location: Santa Rosa, Laguna
- Established: 2000
- Type: Private
- Tournaments: Philippine Open
- Designed by: Tom Weiskopf

The Country Club (TCC) is a golf club in Santa Rosa, Laguna, Philippines.

== History ==
A project to create a golf course at the Canlubang Sugar Estate in Laguna has been proposed as early as 1996. It was touted as a course designed by Tom Weiskopf. It was established by seven golfing friends.

The golf venue, named The Country Club (TCC), was inaugurated on January 26, 2000. The golf club at the time had 400 members.

TCC was the venue for the golf tournament of the 2005 SEA Games. The golf course after a renovation, hosted the Philippine Open from 2017 to 2019.
