= Kimbeley Yap =

Malaysian cyclist

Personal information
- Full name: Kimbeley Yap Fui Lui
- Born: 9 June 1985 (age 41) Malaysia

Cycling career
- Sport: Cycling
- Disciplines: Road cycling, Track cycling, Triathlon

Major wins
- One-day races and Classics National Road Race Championships (2011)
Medal record
Women's Triathlon
Representing Malaysia
Southeast Asian Games
Gold medal – first place	2005 Manila	Triathlon
Gold medal – first place	2007 Nakhon Ratchasima	Triathlon

Kimbeley Yap (born 9 June 1985), also known as Kimbeley Yap Fui Lui, is a road cyclist from Malaysia. She represented her nation at the 2010 UCI Road World Championships in the women's road race and women's time trial and at the 2011 Summer Universiade in the women's road race.

Yap competed in track cycling for Malaysia at the 2010 Asian Games in the women's points race (10th place in final event) and the women's individual pursuit (12th place in qualifying event).

She earned gold medals in the triathlon events at the 2005 Southeast Asian Games and the 2007 Southeast Asian Games. Yap finished 22nd in the triathlon event at the 2006 Commonwealth Games.
