= Upi Darmayana Tamin =

Indonesian chess player

Personal information
- Born: 4 February 1970 (age 56) Jakarta, Indonesia

Chess career
- Country: Indonesia
- Title: Woman International Master (1985)
- Peak rating: 2250 (January 1998)

Upi Darmayana Tamin (born 4 February 1970) is an Indonesian chess player. She was awarded the title of Woman International Master by FIDE in 1985. Tamin won the Asian women's championship of 1996 in Salem, Tamil Nadu, India. In 2002, she won the Anniswati Memorial Cup 1st Leg held in Jakarta.

At the 2005 Southeast Asian Games, she won a bronze medal with the Indonesian team, which finished third in the women's standard team event. Tamin also represented Indonesia at the Women's Chess Olympiad five times, in 1986, 1988, 1994, 1996 and 2000.
