= Toni Leviste =

Filipino equestrian

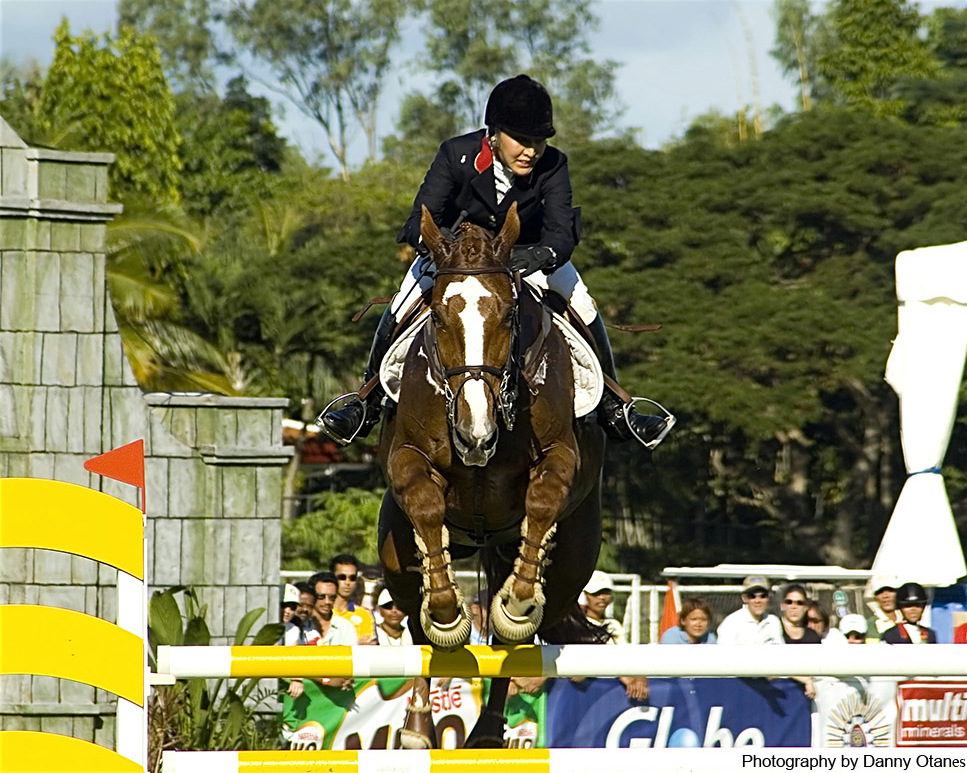
- Leviste on top of Globe Platinum Maktub at the 2005 SEA Games.

Personal information
- Full name: Marie Antoinette Sarangaya Leviste
- Nationality: Philippines
- Discipline: Show jumping, dressage
- Born: August 5, 1973 (age 52)
- Home town: Lipa, Batangas
- Height: 5 ft 2 in (1.57 m)
- Weight: 112 lb (51 kg; 8 st 0 lb)
- Horse: Century Magic; Globe Platinum Maktub; Lacoste 162

Website
- www.tonileviste.com.ph
Medal record
Representing Philippines
Equestrian
Asian Games
Silver medal – second place	2002 Busan	Team jumping
Southeast Asian Games
Gold medal – first place	2005 Manila	Team jumping
Silver medal – second place	2011 Jakarta–Palembang	Individual jumping
Silver medal – second place	2011 Jakarta–Palembang	Teamjumping
Silver medal – second place	2005 Manila	Individual jumping

Marie Antoinette "Toni" Sarangaya Leviste (born August 5, 1973) is a Filipina equestrian athlete. Leviste has represented the Philippines in international competitions, such as the FEI World Cup Show, the Southeast Asian Games, the Asian Games and the Summer Olympics. Leviste has also been awarded the Philippine Sportswriters Association (PSA) Rider of the Year award from 1992 until 2005.

== Early life and education ==
Marie Antoinette Leviste was born on August 5, 1973. Her parents are former Batangas governor Antonio Leviste and Celia Sarangaya.

From 1989 to 2008, politician Loren Legarda was Leviste's stepmother, as Legarda was married to Antonio Leviste. Businessman and legislator Leandro Legarda Leviste of Batangas's 1st congressional district is Toni Leviste's half-brother.

Leviste was inspired to take up horse riding after an activity at Camp John Hay in Baguio. She attended the Ateneo de Manila University and pursued degrees on philosophy and political science.

== Career ==
Leviste had her first jumping competition at age ten. She became part of the Philippine national team in 1990.

Toni Leviste first gained local media attention in 1999 when she won third place in the Sunshine Tour Grand Prix which was held in Jerez de la Frontera, Spain. In the same year, she competed at the World Cup Showjumping Finals, held at Goteborg, Sweden. During this time, she was the first equestrian to represent a country within Southeast Asia in the World Cup.

Leviste then went on to represent her country in the 2000 Summer Olympics at Sydney, Australia, though eventually finishing at 61st place and failing to medal, she noted that it was more important for her during that time to take part in the games rather than winning. Leviste competed again in the 2008 Summer games

At the 2002 Asian Games, Leviste alongside Mikee Cojuangco-Jaworski won team silver in the team jumping event. She has also won several regional tournaments, such as winning the 2004 Globe Platinum Cup in Manila, the 2004 Merdeka Masters in Kuala Lumpur, Malaysia, the 2005 Sony Ericsson Cup in Manila and the 2005 Malaysian Open in Kuwang, Malaysia.

In 2010, she was initially named to the Philippines team for the Asian Games in Guangzhou, China, but she did not compete because the Philippine Olympic Committee decided not to field an equestrian team in order to avoid the high cost of transporting horses to the games.

In 2022, Leviste transitioned from show jumping to dressage. She says she have passed an evaluation at the International Dressage Academy based in Brno, Czech Republic in July of that year.

In July 2025, Leviste finished first at the FEI Prix St. Georges class at the Flemalle CDN in Belgium. This is noted to be the first instance a Filipino won a FEI-level dressage event in Europe.

== Notable horses ==
- Century Magic
- Globe Platinum Maktub – Chestnut mare
  - 2005 SEA Games – Team Jumping Gold Medal
- Lacoste 162 – Hanoverian gelding
  - 2025 FEI Prix St. Georges Flémalle CDN – Dressage Gold Medal

== Personal life ==
Toni Leviste has been a practicing Muslim since 2004. Her father, Antonio Leviste, is a Muslim convert.

She also maintains the Leviste Equestrian Eco Park, a stable in her hometown of Lipa, Batangas. The facility, which she described as a "horse spa", has been in place as early as 2001.
