= Benjamin Tolentino =

Filipino rower (born 1973)

Benjamin Tolentino Jr.
Personal information
- Born: Benjamin Permejo Tolentino Jr. September 13, 1973 (age 53)
- Military career
- Allegiance: Philippines
- Branch: Philippine Air Force
- Rank: Seargeant
Medal record
Representing Philippines
Men's rowing
Southeast Asian Games
Gold medal – first place	2005 Manila	Lightweight single sculls
Gold medal – first place	2005 Manila	Lightweight double sculls
Gold medal – first place	2005 Manila	Coxless Pairs
Gold medal – first place	2007 Nakhon Ratchasima	Single sculls
Gold medal – first place	2007 Nakhon Ratchasima	Double sculls
Silver medal – second place	2013 Naypyidaw	Double sculls
Silver medal – second place	2011 Jakarta	Double sculls
Bronze medal – third place	2015 Singapore	Lightweight doubles sculls 1,000 m

Benjamin Permejo Tolentino Jr. (born September 13, 1973) is a Filipino rower who competed in the 2000 Summer Olympics.

Tolentino has competed for the Philippines in international competitions as early as 1995. He has competed in the Asian Games since the 1998 edition. In December 2017, he has expressed his intention to retire from the sport as a competitor and his plans to become a rowing coach.

He is also a sergeant of the Philippine Air Force.
