= Genebert Basadre =

Filipino boxer (1984–2021)

Personal information
- Nationality: Filipino
- Born: January 5, 1984
- Died: April 25, 2021 (aged 37) Cagayan de Oro, Philippines

Sport
- Sport: Boxing
Medal record
Representing Philippines
Men's Boxing
Asian Games
Bronze medal – third place	Doha 2006	Lightweight
SEA Games
Gold medal – first place	Bacolod 2005	Lightweight

Genebert Basadre (January 5, 1984 – April 25, 2021) was an amateur boxer from the Philippines who competed in the Lightweight (-60 kg) division.

== Career ==
Basadre started joining international amateur competitions in the early 2000s, with his first medal being the bronze he won at the 2002 Acropolis Cup in Athens, Greece. In the following year he clinched bronzes in two separate tournaments in Spain and Lithuania.

Basadre made a failed attempt to qualify for the 2004 Summer Olympics in Athens. He joined the 2nd AIBA Asian Olympic qualifiers in Pakistan with his campaign ending in the quarterfinals.

At the 2005 Southeast Asian Games, Basadre won a gold medal. He also clinched a bronze medal at the 2006 Asian Games in a lost bout against China's Hu Qing 8–29.

He went on to win a silver medal at the 2006 Tammer Cup in Tampere, Finland. His last medal was a silver which he won at the 2009 Kings Cup in Thailand before retiring in 2010 to fully commit to the Philippine Army.

== Later life and death ==
While Basadre retired from competitive boxing, he did coaching work at his hometown of Cagayan de Oro. He collapsed at his residence on April 19, 2021, and was rushed to the Polymedic Plaza Hospital of Cagayan de Oro. He lapsed into a coma and died on April 25.
