= Wrestling at the 2005 SEA Games =

- Venue: San Andres Gymnasium
- Location: San Andres, Manila
- Start date: November 28, 2005
- End date: November 30, 2005

Wrestling at the 2005 SEA Games logo

Wrestling at the 2005 SEA Games took place in the San Andres Gymnasium in San Andres, Manila, Philippines. The event was split into two disciplines, Freestyle and Greco-Roman which are further divided into different weight categories. Men competed in both disciplines whereas women only took part in the Freestyle event with 12 gold medals being contested in all.

== Medal winners ==
Free

Category	Gold	Silver	Bronze
Men's < 55 kg	Nguyen Van Hop (Vietnam)	Margarito Angana (Philippines)	Ressada Chusong (Thailand)
Men's < 55 kg	Nguyen Van Hop (Vietnam)	Margarito Angana (Philippines)	Surianto (Indonesia)
Men's; 55 to 60 kg	Doi Dang Hy (Vietnam)	Chaptong Orachun (Thailand)	Melchor Tumasis (Philippines)
Men's; 55 to 60 kg	Doi Dang Hy (Vietnam)	Chaptong Orachun (Thailand)	Sinachone Xayyasuk (Laos)
Men's; 60 to 66 kg	Jimmy Angana (Philippines)	Phan Duc Thang (Vietnam)	Thanakorn Tud-Ead (Thailand)
Men's; 66 to 74 kg	Le Duy Hoi (Vietnam)	Jumain (Indonesia)	Michael Baletin (Philippines)
Men's; 74 to 84 kg	Man Ba Xuan (Vietnam)	Rudi Septhadi (Indonesia)	Rawin Phetkhaek (Thailand)
Men's; 84 to 96 kg	Marcus Valda (Philippines)	Nguyen Van Duc (Vietnam)	Aji Sutrisno (Indonesia)
Men's; 96 to 120 kg	Francis Villanueva (Philippines)	Arthit Chairat (Thailand)	Agustafa (Indonesia)
Women's <48 kg	Suphornphan Kaewsamat (Thailand)	Nguyen Thi Hang (Vietnam)	Chov Sotheara (Cambodia)
Women's; 48 to 51 kg	Cristina Villanueva (Philippines)	Nguyen Thi Thu (Vietnam)	Onanong Chari (Thailand)
Women's; 51 to 55 kg	Nghiem Thi Giang (Vietnam)	Belinda Lapuente (Philippines)	Sunusa Klahan (Thailand)
Women's; 55 to 59 kg	Gemma Silverio (Philippines)	Pattana Promeam (Thailand)	Try Sothavy (Cambodia)
Women's; 59 to 63 kg	Luong Thi Quyen (Vietnam)	Cherry Matriz (Philippines)	Wong Duean Khamrahong (Thailand)
