= Markwin Tee =

Filipino ten-pin bowling player

Markwin Tee is a Filipino ten-pin bowler. He finished in 9th position of the combined rankings at the 2006 AMF World Cup.
