= Joanna Franquelli =

Filipino basketball player and fencer

Personal information
- Nationality: Filipino
- Born: November 3, 1976 (age 49)

Sport
- Sport: Basketball, Fencing, Handball (coach, Philippines)
Medal record
Women's basketball
Representing the Philippines
SEABA Championship
Silver medal – second place	1997 Bangkok	Team
Southeast Asian Games
Silver medal – second place	1995 Chiang Mai	{{{2}}}
Women's Fencing
Representing the Philippines
Southeast Asian Games
Silver medal – second place	2005 Manila	Individual Sabre
Bronze medal – third place	2005 Manila	Team Sabre
Bronze medal – third place	2007 Nakhon Ratchasima	Individual Sabre

Joanna Villa-Real Franquelli is a Filipino former basketball player and fencer. She is the current head coach of the Philippines women's national handball team.

== Sporting career ==
=== Basketball ===
Franquelli played for the women's basketball team of the University of Santo Tomas and was named the first woman MVP of the University Athletic Association of the Philippines (UAAP) for the 1995-96 season. She led UST to two senior titles

She was part of the Philippines women's national basketball team that won silver at the 1997 SEABA Championship under coach Ricardo Roces.

=== Fencing ===
Franquelli also competed for her country as a fencer. At the 2007 Southeast Asian Games she managed to get a bronze medal at the women's individual saber event. She also competed at the 2006 Asian Games.

=== Handball ===
Franquelli mentored the women's national handball team that participated at the 2013 Southeast Asian Women's Handball Championships, which was the team's first international competition. She is the head coach of the women's team as early as November 2012.
