= Joker Arroyo (equestrian) =

Filipino equestrian

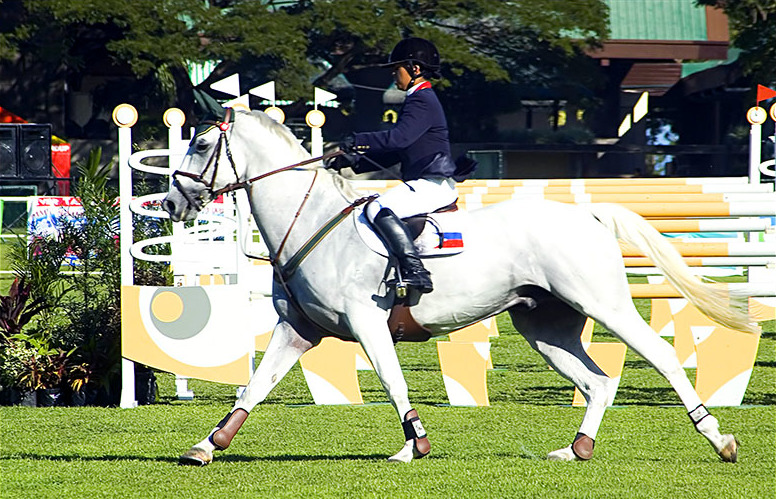
- Philippine equestrian Joker Arroyo and Without a Doubt at the 2005 Southeast Asian Games (Manila, Philippines) - Team Gold Medal

Personal information
- Full name: Joker Aquino Arroyo
- Nationality: Philippines
- Discipline: Show jumping
- Born: May 4, 1988 (age 38); Los Angeles, CA, USA
- Horse(s): Without a Doubt; Didi de Goedereede; Balou Girl
Medal record
Representing the Philippines
Equestrian
Southeast Asian Games
Gold medal – first place	2005 Manila	Team jumping
Silver medal – second place	2011 Jakarta	Team jumping
Asian Equestrian Championship
Silver medal – second place	2019 Pattaya	Team jumping

Joker Arroyo is a leading equestrian athlete representing the Philippines.

Born on May 4, 1988, in Los Angeles, CA, USA, Arroyo is the youngest daughter of late Senator Joker Arroyo and lawyer Felicitas S. Aquino. She graduated from the British School Manila in 2006, then from Yale University in 2010 where she attained a Bachelor of Arts in Political Science. While at Yale, Arroyo was also Captain of the Yale Equestrian Team.

Arroyo has been a Philippine equestrian team stalwart for many years. Her first championship appearance was at the 2005 Southeast Asian Games, winning the Team Gold Medal with Without a Doubt. Arroyo also was a member of the Philippine Team at the 2011 Southeast Asian Games, this time riding Didi de Goedereede, where the Philippine team won the Team Silver Medal. She was also a competitor at the 2014 Asian Games, again with her horse Didi de Goedereede (Top 25 individually). Arroyo also participated in the 2018 Asian Games with Ubama Alia (Top 20 individually). She most recently won the Team Silver Medal at the 2019 FEI Asian Equestrian Championship, again with Ubama Alia.

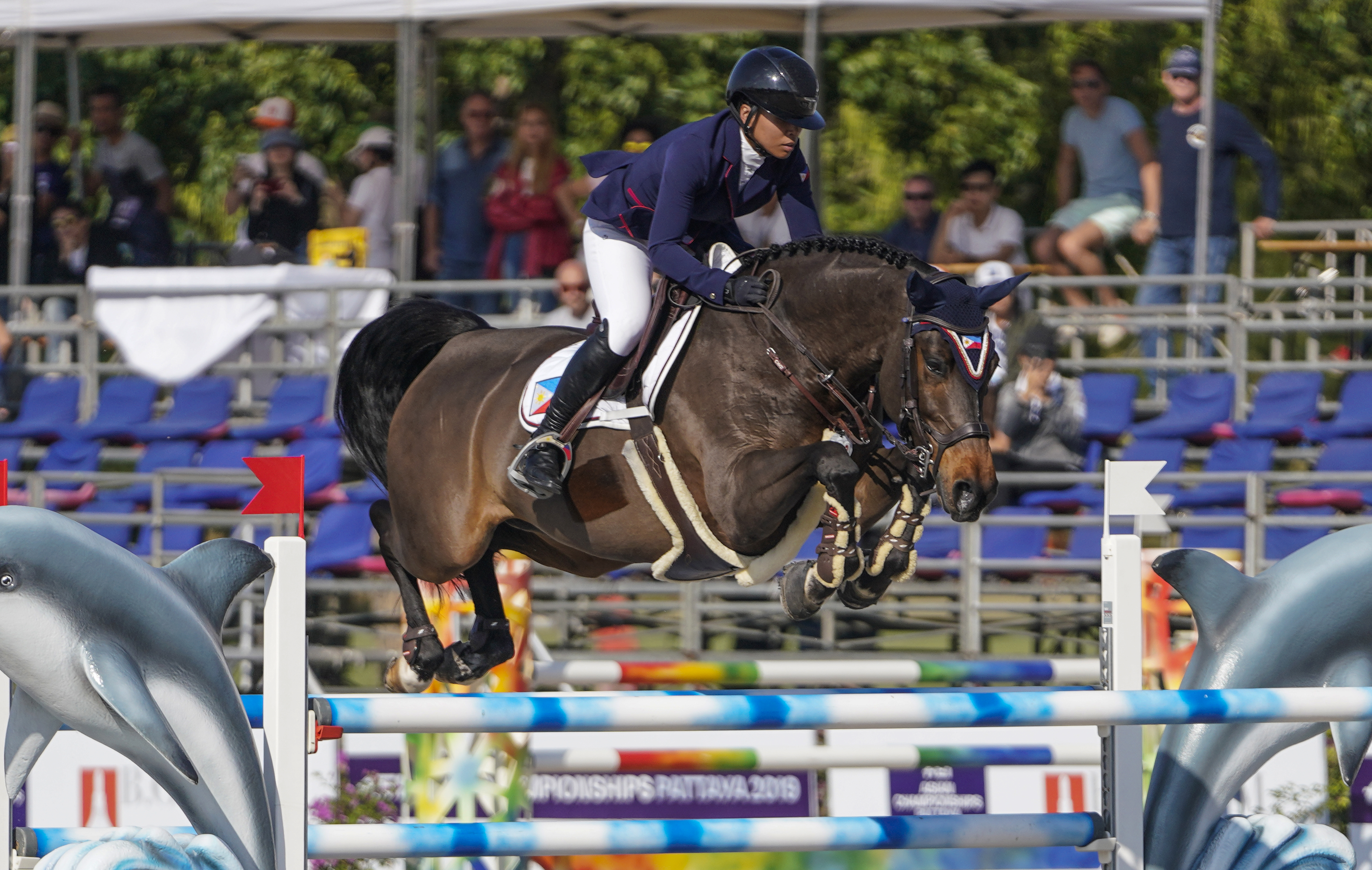
Arroyo with Ubama Alia at the 2019 FEI Asian Championships (Pattaya, Thailand) - Team Silver Medal

She is also the Philippine national record holder in the Puissance Event, having cleared 1.74m with her horse Without a Doubt in 2005.

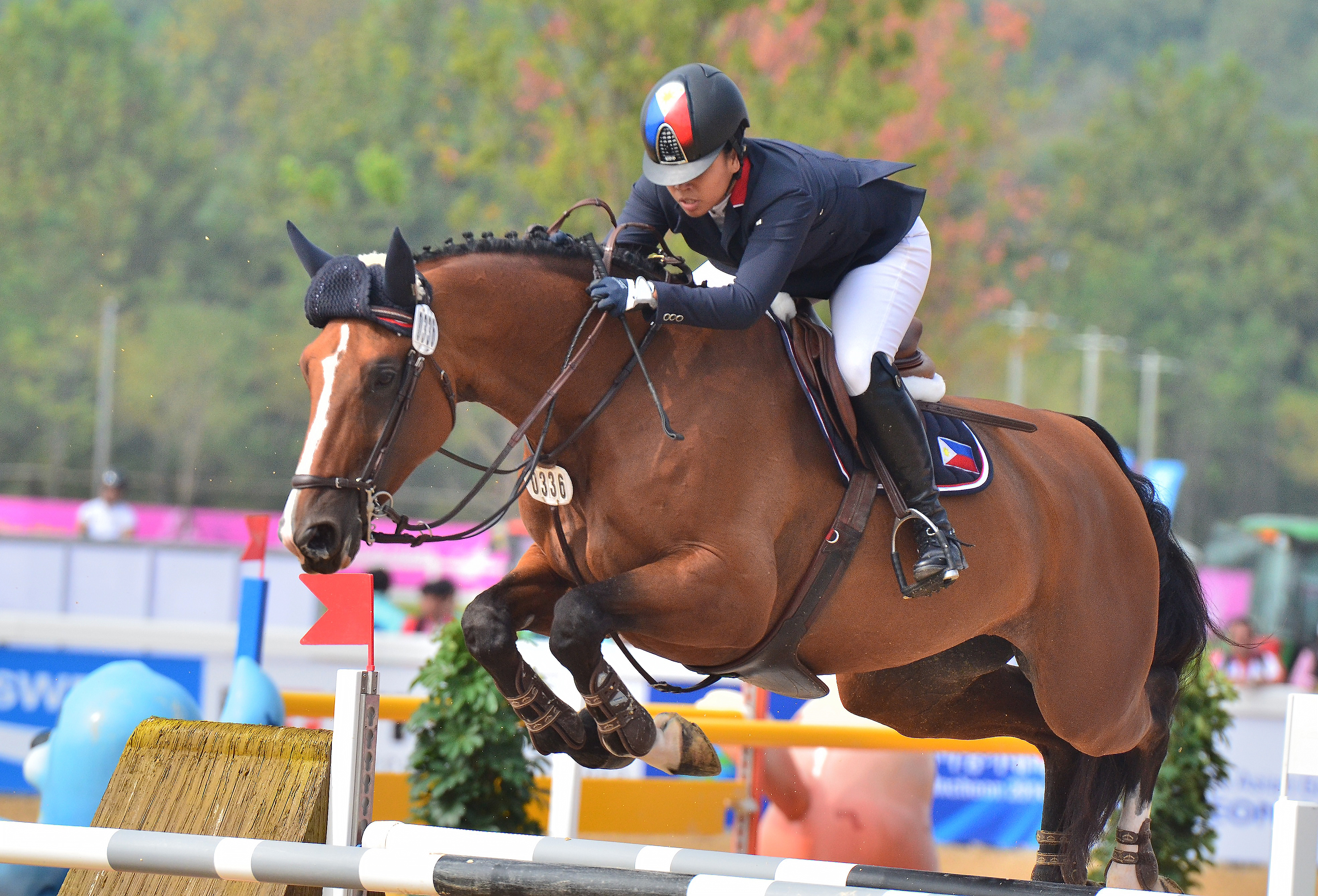
Arroyo and Didi de Goedereede representing Team Philippines at the 2014 Asian Games (Incheon, Korea) for a Top 25 Individual result.

Arroyo owns and operates JFJC Equestrian Training Services. Arroyo divides her time between the Philippines and France, coaching/training a number of riders and their horses both at home and abroad.

She is also founding member of Equestrian Philippines, Inc. (EqPH), where she sits as Sports Director in the Board of Directors. EqPH is the country's premier equestrian sport development organization, responsible for organizing various competitions, training programs with internationally renowned athletes and coaches, and bringing elite-level equine management services into the country.

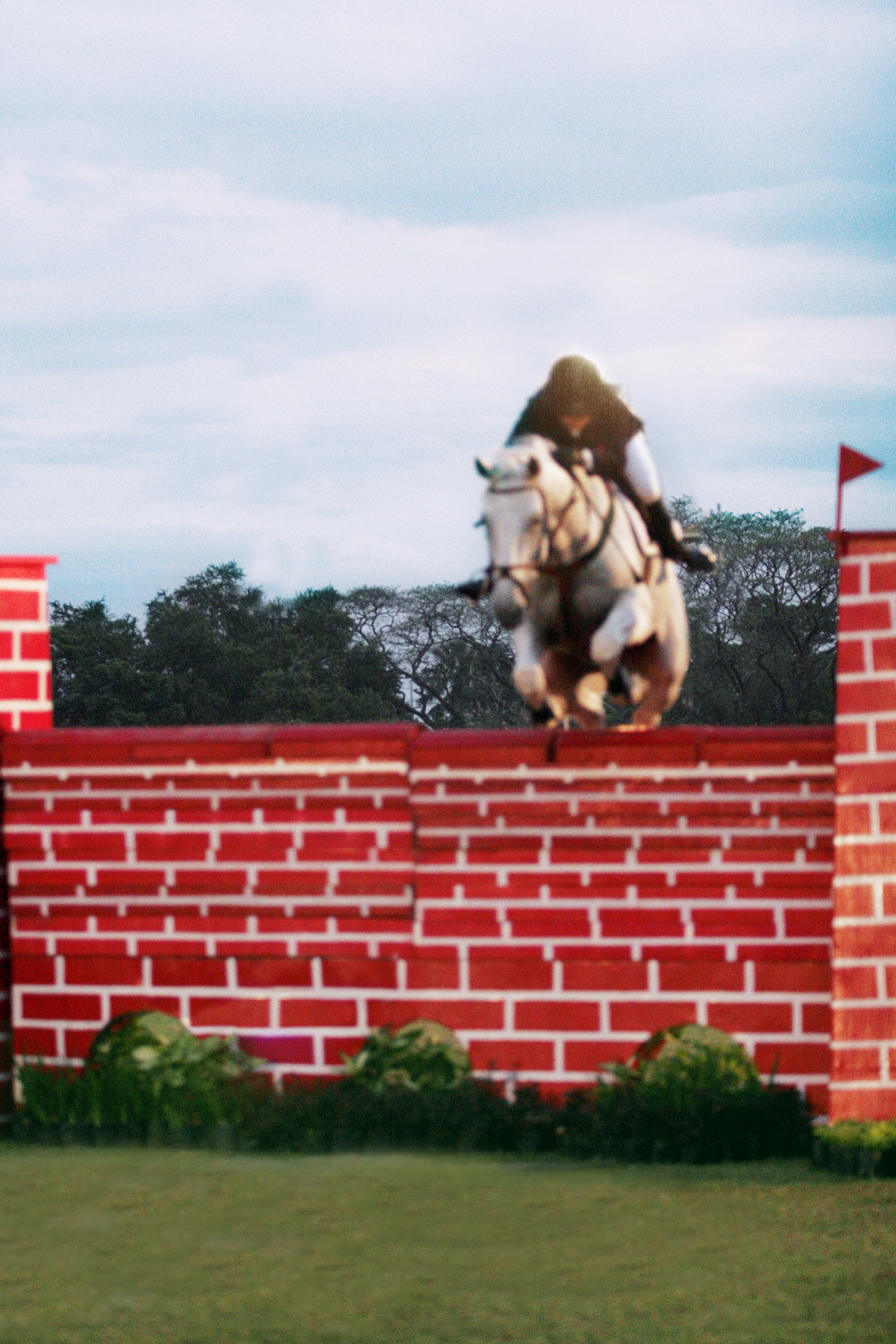
Joker Arroyo and Without a Doubt, setting the Philippine National Record in Puissance by jumping 1.74m at the 2005 Kamiseta Cup (Manila, Philippines)
