= Traditional boat race at the 2005 SEA Games =

Traditional Boat Race at the 2005 SEA Games
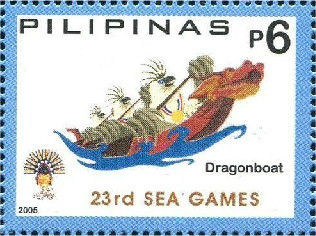
- Logo of dragon boat race at the 2005 SEA Games on a 2005 stamp of the Philippines
- Venue: La Mesa Dam
- Location: Novaliches Reservoir; Quezon City, Metro Manila
- Start date: December 2, 2005
- End date: December 4, 2005

Traditional boat race or dragon boat race at the 2005 SEA Games took place at the La Mesa Dam in the Novaliches Reservoir, Quezon City, Metro Manila, Philippines.

The event was held from December 2–4.

== Medal winners ==
Country	Gold	Silver	Bronze	Total
Philippines	6	0	0	6
Myanmar	0	4	2	6
Indonesia	0	2	4	6
Total	6	6	6	18

Event	Gold	Silver	Bronze
Men's 10A-Side (500m)	Philippines	Myanmar	Indonesia
Men's 10A-Side (1000m)	Philippines	Indonesia	Myanmar
Men's 20A-Side (500m)	Philippines	Myanmar	Indonesia
Men's 20A-Side (1000m)	Philippines	Myanmar	Indonesia
Women's 10A-Side (500m)	Philippines	Myanmar	Indonesia
Women's 10A-Side (1000m)	Philippines	Indonesia	Myanmar
