= Paul Brian Rosario =

Filipino sport shooter

Paul Brian Rosario (born 17 April 1982, in Manila) is a Filipino sport shooter. At the 2012 Summer Olympics he competed in the men's skeet, finishing in 31st place.
