= Laos at the 2005 SEA Games =

Laos at the 2005 Southeast Asian Games
- IOC code: LAO
- NOC: National Olympic Committee of Lao

in the Manila
- Competitors: 75
- Flag bearer: Chanthavong Panyasiri
- Medals Ranked 8th: Gold 3 Silver 4 Bronze 12 Total 19

Southeast Asian Games appearances
- 1959; 1961; 1965; 1967; 1969; 1971; 1973; 1975–1987; 1989; 1991; 1993; 1995; 1997; 1999; 2001; 2003; 2005; 2007; 2009; 2011; 2013; 2015; 2017; 2019; 2021; 2023; 2025; 2027; 2029

Laos participated in the 2005 Southeast Asian Games held in multiple venues in the Philippines from November 27, 2005, to December 5, 2005. It won 3 gold 4 silver and 12 bronze medals. The chief of mission to the games was Somphou Phongsa.
