= Cambodia at the 2005 SEA Games =

Cambodia at the 2005 Southeast Asian Games
- IOC code: CAM
- NOC: National Olympic Committee of Cambodia
- Website: www.noccambodia.org (in Khmer and English)

in the Manila
- Competitors: 77
- Flag bearer: Kohm Ratana Mony
- Medals Ranked 10th: Gold 0 Silver 3 Bronze 9 Total 12

Southeast Asian Games appearances (overview)
- 1961; 1965; 1967–1981; 1983; 1985; 1987; 1989–1993; 1995; 1997; 1999; 2001; 2003; 2005; 2007; 2009; 2011; 2013; 2015; 2017; 2019; 2021; 2023; 2025; 2027; 2029

Cambodia participated in the 2005 Southeast Asian Games which were held in multiple venues in the Philippines from November 27, 2005 to December 5, 2005. The chief of mission to the games was Prum Bun Yi. It won 3 silver and 9 bronze medals at the games and was ranked 10th among the participating countries.

== Sea games hosting ==
Cambodia will be the host of the 2021 Southeast Asian Games.
