= Thailand at the 2005 SEA Games =

Thailand at the 2005 Southeast Asian Games
- IOC code: THA
- NOC: National Olympic Committee of Thailand
- Website: www.olympicthai.or.th/eng (in English and Thai)

in the Manila
- Competitors: 677
- Flag bearer: Tavarit Majcharcheep (shooting)
- Medals Ranked 2nd: Gold 87 Silver 78 Bronze 118 Total 283

Southeast Asian Games appearances (overview)
- 1961; 1965; 1967; 1969; 1971; 1973; 1975; 1977; 1979; 1981; 1983; 1985; 1987; 1989; 1991; 1993; 1995; 1997; 1999; 2001; 2003; 2005; 2007; 2009; 2011; 2013; 2015; 2017; 2019; 2021; 2023; 2025; 2027; 2029

Thailand participated in the 2005 Southeast Asian Games held at multiple venues in the Philippines from November 27, 2005 to December 5, 2005. The chief of mission to the games was Thana Chaiprasit. At the opening ceremony, The Thai delegation was accompanied by Princess Sirivannavari Nariratana. It won 87 gold, 78 silver, and 118 bronze medals at the games.

== Participation details ==
The 2005 Southeast Asian Games, officially known as the 23rd Southeast Asian Games, was a Southeast Asian multi-sport event held in Manila, Philippines. This was the third time the Philippines hosted the games and its first time since 1991. Previously, Philippines also staged the games for the first time in 1981. Around 5336 athletes from 11 participating nations participated at the games which featured 443 events in 40 sports.

The games was held from 27 November to 5 December 2005, although several events had commenced from 20 November 2005. The games was opened and closed by Gloria Macapagal Arroyo, the President of the Philippines at the Quirino Grandstand, Rizal Park. The final medal tally was led by host Philippines, followed by Thailand and Vietnam.

Several Games and national records were broken during the games. Though there were several controversies, the games were deemed generally successful with the rising standard of competition amongst the Southeast Asian Nations.

14 years after the 2005 SEA Games, the Philippines hosted the 2019 edition of the Southeast Asian Games, which was decentralized with no designated host city. Although this edition was also held in different venues in the Philippines, Manila is officially designated as the host city.
