= Billiards and snooker at the SEA Games =

Billiards and Snooker were first included in the Southeast Asian Games at the 1987 Southeast Asian Games in Jakarta.

== All-time medal table ==
Rank	Nation	Gold	Silver	Bronze	Total
1	Philippines	38	26	34	98
2	Thailand	28	14	26	68
3	Vietnam	16	18	23	57
4	Singapore	12	10	35	57
5	Indonesia	8	12	18	38
6	Malaysia	7	21	20	48
7	Myanmar	7	14	16	37
8	Cambodia	2	0	2	4
9	Laos	1	1	2	4
Totals (9 entries)		119	116	176	411

== Medalists ==
=== Men ===
==== English Billiards Singles ====
Year	Location	Gold	Silver	Bronze
1987	(Indonesia) Jakarta	(Philippines) Efren Reyes	(Malaysia) Moh Loon Hong	No bronze awarded
1991	(Philippines) Manila	(Malaysia) Moh Loon Hong	(Thailand) Mongkhon Kanfaklang	No bronze awarded
1993	Singapore	(Thailand) Mongkhon Kanfaklang	(Thailand) Ta Tanyuthitham	(Malaysia) Moh Loon Hong
1995	(Thailand) Chiang Mai	(Malaysia) Moh Loon Hong	(Thailand) Mongkhon Kanfaklang	(Singapore) Richard Lim Sin Foo
1997	(Indonesia) Jakarta	(Thailand) Praprut Chaithanasakun	(Indonesia) Hong Soe Liong	(Thailand) Mongkhon Kanfaklang
1999	(Brunei) Bandar Seri Begawan	(Thailand) Praprut Chaithanasakun	(Singapore) Freddie Soh Chye Hian	(Philippines) Reynaldo Grandea
2001	(Malaysia) Kuala Lumpur	(Indonesia) Mohammed Muslim	(Myanmar) U Kyaw Oo	(Indonesia) Hasan Manfaluti
2003	(Vietnam) Ho Chi Minh City	(Thailand) Praprut Chaithanasakun	(Thailand) Thawat Sujaritthurakarn	(Indonesia) Hasan Manfaluti
2005	(Philippines) Manila	(Vietnam) Nguyen Thanh Long	(Myanmar) U Kyaw Oo	(Indonesia) Hasan Manfaluti
2007	(Thailand) Nakhon Ratchasima	(Thailand) Praprut Chaithanasakun	(Thailand) Thawat Sujaritthurakarn	(Myanmar) Nay Thway Oo
2009	(Laos) Vientiane	(Singapore) Peter Gilchrist	(Myanmar) Kyaw Oo	(Thailand) Thawat Surajitthurakarn
2011	(Indonesia) Palembang	(Singapore) Peter Gilchrist	(Thailand) Praprut Chaithanasakun	(Myanmar) Kyaw Oo
2011	(Indonesia) Palembang	(Singapore) Peter Gilchrist	(Thailand) Praprut Chaithanasakun	(Myanmar) Nay Thway Oo
2013	(Myanmar) Naypyidaw	(Singapore) Peter Gilchrist	(Myanmar) Nay Thway Oo	(Myanmar) Aung San Oo
2013	(Myanmar) Naypyidaw	(Singapore) Peter Gilchrist	(Myanmar) Nay Thway Oo	(Thailand) Praprut Chaithanasakun
2015	Singapore	(Singapore) Peter Gilchrist	(Myanmar) Aung Htay	(Myanmar) Kyaw Oo
2015	Singapore	(Singapore) Peter Gilchrist	(Myanmar) Aung Htay	(Thailand) Praprut Chaithanasakun
2017	(Malaysia) Kuala Lumpur	(Singapore) Peter Gilchrist	(Myanmar) Chit Ko Ko	(Thailand) Praprut Chaithanasakun
2017	(Malaysia) Kuala Lumpur	(Singapore) Peter Gilchrist	(Myanmar) Chit Ko Ko	(Myanmar) Nay Thway Oo
2019	(Philippines) Manila	(Singapore) Peter Gilchrist	(Myanmar) Nay Thway Oo	(Thailand) Yuttapop Pakpoj
2019	(Philippines) Manila	(Singapore) Peter Gilchrist	(Myanmar) Nay Thway Oo	(Vietnam) Tran Le Anh Tuan
2021	(Vietnam) Hanoi	(Myanmar) Pauk Sa	(Singapore) Peter Gilchrist	(Thailand) Yuttapop Pakpoj
2021	(Vietnam) Hanoi	(Myanmar) Pauk Sa	(Singapore) Peter Gilchrist	(Thailand) Praprut Chaithanasakun
2023	(Cambodia) Phnom Penh	(Myanmar) Pauk Sa	(Singapore) Peter Gilchrist	(Thailand) Yuttapop Pakpoj
2023	(Cambodia) Phnom Penh	(Myanmar) Pauk Sa	(Singapore) Peter Gilchrist	(Thailand) Praprut Chaithanasakun
2025	(Thailand) Nonthaburi	(Singapore) Peter Gilchrist	(Myanmar) Pauk Sa	(Thailand) Yuttapop Pakpoj
2025	(Thailand) Nonthaburi	(Singapore) Peter Gilchrist	(Myanmar) Pauk Sa	(Thailand) Praprut Chaithanasakun

==== English Billiards Singles (500 points) ====
Year	Location	Gold	Silver	Bronze
2015	Singapore	(Singapore) Peter Gilchrist	(Vietnam) Nguyen Thanh Binh	(Thailand) Praprut Chaithanasakun
2015	Singapore	(Singapore) Peter Gilchrist	(Vietnam) Nguyen Thanh Binh	(Thailand) Thawat Sujaritthurakarn

==== English Billiards Doubles ====
Year	Location	Gold	Silver	Bronze
1991	(Philippines) Manila	(Thailand) Praprut Chaithanasakun (Thailand) Noppadon Noppachorn	(Thailand) Chuchart Triritanapradit (Thailand) Preecha Sae Be	(Malaysia) Moh Loon Hong (Malaysia) Liew Kitt Fatt
1995	(Thailand) Chiang Mai	(Thailand) Udon Khaimuk (Thailand) Mongkhon Kanfaklang	(Malaysia) Moh Loon Hong (Malaysia) Lean Kam Beng	(Philippines) Reynaldo Grandea (Philippines) Luis Saberdo
1999	(Brunei) Bandar Seri Begawan	(Thailand) Praprut Chaithanasakun (Thailand) Udon Khaimuk	(Malaysia) Moh Loon Hong (Malaysia) Lee Thye Hong	(Singapore) Freddie Soh Chye Hian (Singapore) Alan Puan Teik Chong
2001	(Malaysia) Kuala Lumpur	(Thailand) Praprut Chaithanasakun (Thailand) Udon Khaimuk	(Malaysia) Moh Loon Hong (Malaysia) Lee Thye Hong	(Vietnam) Le Dac Tho (Vietnam) Nguyen Thanh Long
2003	(Vietnam) Ho Chi Minh City	(Thailand) Praprut Chaithanasakun (Thailand) Udon Khaimuk	(Myanmar) U Kyaw Oo (Myanmar) Aung San Oo	(Singapore) Freddie Soh Chye Hian (Singapore) Glenn Yeo Teck Shin
2005	(Philippines) Manila	(Myanmar) U Kyaw Oo (Myanmar) Aung San Oo	(Thailand) Praprut Chaithanasakun (Thailand) Atthasit Mahitthi	(Malaysia) Lean Kam Beng (Malaysia) Roslan Yurnalis
2007	(Thailand) Nakhon Ratchasima	(Myanmar) U Kyaw Oo (Myanmar) San Oo Aung	(Malaysia) Roslan Bin Yurnalis (Malaysia) Hong Moh Loon	(Thailand) Praprut Chaithanasakun (Thailand) Thawat Sujaritthurakarn
2009	(Laos) Vientiane	(Thailand) Praprut Chaithanasakun (Thailand) Thawat Sujaritthurakarn	(Myanmar) U Kyaw Oo (Myanmar) Aung Htay	(Singapore) Peter Gilchrist (Singapore) Marvin Lim Chun Kiat
2011	(Indonesia) Palembang	(Thailand) Praprut Chaithanasakun (Thailand) Thawat Sujaritthurakarn	(Myanmar) U Kyaw Oo (Myanmar) Nay Thway Oo	(Singapore) Peter Gilchrist (Singapore) Tommy Ang Boon Chin
2011	(Indonesia) Palembang	(Thailand) Praprut Chaithanasakun (Thailand) Thawat Sujaritthurakarn	(Myanmar) U Kyaw Oo (Myanmar) Nay Thway Oo	(Vietnam) Nguyen Thanh Binh (Vietnam) Pham Hoai Nam
2013	(Myanmar) Naypyidaw	(Thailand) Praprut Chaithanasakun (Thailand) Thawat Sujaritthurakarn	(Myanmar) Aung San Oo (Myanmar) Nay Thway Oo	(Singapore) Chan Keng Kwang (Singapore) Peter Gilchrist
2013	(Myanmar) Naypyidaw	(Thailand) Praprut Chaithanasakun (Thailand) Thawat Sujaritthurakarn	(Myanmar) Aung San Oo (Myanmar) Nay Thway Oo	(Vietnam) Thanh Binh Nguyen (Vietnam) Hoai Nam Pham
2015	Singapore	(Myanmar) Aung Htay (Myanmar) Min Si Thu Tun	(Singapore) Chan Keng Kwang (Singapore) Peter Gilchrist	(Thailand) Praprut Chaithanasakun (Thailand) Thawat Sujaritthurakarn
2015	Singapore	(Myanmar) Aung Htay (Myanmar) Min Si Thu Tun	(Singapore) Chan Keng Kwang (Singapore) Peter Gilchrist	(Vietnam) Nguyen Thanh Binh (Vietnam) Nguyen Trung Kien
2017	(Malaysia) Kuala Lumpur	(Thailand) Praprut Chaithanasakun (Thailand) Thawat Sujaritthurakarn	(Myanmar) Aung Htay (Myanmar) Min Si Thu Tun	(Singapore) Peter Gilchrist (Singapore) Glenn Yeo Teck Shin
2017	(Malaysia) Kuala Lumpur	(Thailand) Praprut Chaithanasakun (Thailand) Thawat Sujaritthurakarn	(Myanmar) Aung Htay (Myanmar) Min Si Thu Tun	(Vietnam) Nguyen Thanh Binh (Vietnam) Tran Le Anh Tuan
2021	(Vietnam) Hanoi	(Singapore) Peter Gilchrist (Singapore) Alex Puan Yi Wei	(Myanmar) Pauk Sa (Myanmar) Min Si Thu Tun	(Thailand) Thawat Sujaritthurakarn (Thailand) Praprut Chaithanasakun
2021	(Vietnam) Hanoi	(Singapore) Peter Gilchrist (Singapore) Alex Puan Yi Wei	(Myanmar) Pauk Sa (Myanmar) Min Si Thu Tun	(Vietnam) Nguyen Thanh Binh (Vietnam) Tran Le Anh Tuan

==== English Billiards Scotch Doubles ====
Year	Location	Gold	Silver	Bronze
2013	(Myanmar) Naypyidaw	(Thailand) Praprut Chaithanasakun (Thailand) Suriya Suwannasingh	(Myanmar) Nay Thway Oo (Myanmar) Aung Htay	(Singapore) Chan Keng Kwang (Singapore) Peter Gilchrist
2013	(Myanmar) Naypyidaw	(Thailand) Praprut Chaithanasakun (Thailand) Suriya Suwannasingh	(Myanmar) Nay Thway Oo (Myanmar) Aung Htay	(Vietnam) Nguyen Thanh Binh (Vietnam) Pham Hoai Nam

==== English Billiards Team ====
Year	Location	Gold	Silver	Bronze
1993	Singapore	Thailand	(Malaysia) Moh Loon Hong (Malaysia) Lee Thye Hong (Malaysia) Lean Kam Beng	Singapore
1995	(Thailand) Chiang Mai	(Thailand) Mong Kol Kanfakalang (Thailand) Prasong Phlarak (Thailand) Surasak Netwong	Philippines	(Singapore) Richard Lim Sin Foo (Singapore) Lau Weng Yew (Singapore) Alan Puan Teik Chong
1997	(Indonesia) Jakarta	(Thailand) Praprut Chaithanasakun (Thailand) Mongkhon Kanfaklang (Thailand) Udon Khaimuk	Myanmar	(Philippines) Reynaldo Grandea (Philippines) Luis Saberdo (Philippines) Jose Uy
2001	(Malaysia) Kuala Lumpur	(Thailand) Praprut Chaithanasakun (Thailand) Thawat Sujaritthurakarn (Thailand) Udon Khaimuk	(Indonesia) Rachmatullah (Indonesia) Hasan Manfaluti (Indonesia) Mohammed Muslim	(Philippines) Efren Reyes (Philippines) Marlon Manalo (Philippines) Reynaldo Grandea
2013	(Myanmar) Naypyidaw	(Myanmar) Nay Thway Oo (Myanmar) Aung Htay	(Thailand) Praprut Chaithanasakun (Thailand) Thawat Sujaritthurakarn	(Singapore) Chan Keng Kwang (Singapore) Peter Gilchrist
2013	(Myanmar) Naypyidaw	(Myanmar) Nay Thway Oo (Myanmar) Aung Htay	(Thailand) Praprut Chaithanasakun (Thailand) Thawat Sujaritthurakarn	(Indonesia) Hekta Hekta (Indonesia) Jaka Kurniawan
2015	Singapore	(Thailand) Praprut Chaithanasakun (Thailand) Thawat Sujaritthurakarn (Thailand) Suriya Suwannasingh	(Myanmar) Aung Htay (Myanmar) Kyaw Oo (Myanmar) Min Si Thu Tun	(Indonesia) Jaka Kurniawan (Indonesia) Sahroni Sahroni (Indonesia) Marlando Sihombing
2015	Singapore	(Thailand) Praprut Chaithanasakun (Thailand) Thawat Sujaritthurakarn (Thailand) Suriya Suwannasingh	(Myanmar) Aung Htay (Myanmar) Kyaw Oo (Myanmar) Min Si Thu Tun	(Vietnam) Nguyen Thanh Binh (Vietnam) Nguyen Trung Kien (Vietnam) Pham Hoai Nam
2025	(Thailand) Nonthaburi	Myanmar Pauk Sa Nay Thway Oo Aung Htay	Singapore Peter Gilchrist Karthik Ramaswamy	Thailand Praprut Chaithanasakun Thawat Sujaritthurakarn Yuttapop Pakpoj
2025	(Thailand) Nonthaburi	Myanmar Pauk Sa Nay Thway Oo Aung Htay	Singapore Peter Gilchrist Karthik Ramaswamy	Indonesia Marlando Sihombing Toni Setiadi Gebby Adi Wibawa Putra

==== Snooker Singles ====
Year	Location	Gold	Silver	Bronze
1987	(Indonesia) Jakarta	(Thailand) Sakchai Sim-Ngam	(Singapore) Benjamin Lui Yew Keong	(Thailand) Udon Khaimuk
1991	(Philippines) Manila	(Thailand) Praprut Chaithanasakun	(Thailand) Chuchart Triritanapradit	(Philippines) Marlon Manalo
1993	Singapore	(Thailand) Praprut Chaithanasakun	(Thailand) Chuchart Triritanapradit	(Malaysia) Chong Tin Sam
1995	(Thailand) Chiang Mai	(Malaysia) Chong Tin Sam	(Philippines) Marlon Manalo	(Singapore) Thomas Ang Chick Hong
1997	(Indonesia) Jakarta	(Thailand) Kwan Poomjang	(Singapore) Keith E Boon	(Thailand) Phaitoon Phonbun
1999	(Brunei) Bandar Seri Begawan	(Malaysia) Chong Tin Sam	(Thailand) Noppadon Noppachorn	(Philippines) Marlon Manalo
2001	(Malaysia) Kuala Lumpur	(Thailand) Somporn Kunthawang	(Malaysia) Ng Ann Seng	(Singapore) Keith E Boon
2003	(Vietnam) Ho Chi Minh City	(Thailand) Noppadon Noppachorn	(Philippines) Marlon Manalo	(Thailand) Issara Kachaiwong
2005	(Philippines) Manila	(Thailand) Issara Kachaiwong	(Thailand) Nitiwat Kanjanasari	(Malaysia) Moh Keen Hoo
2007	(Thailand) Nakhon Ratchasima	(Malaysia) Moh Keen Ho	(Thailand) Noppadol Sangnil	(Thailand) Atthasit Mahitthi
2009	(Laos) Vientiane	(Thailand) Supoj Saenla	(Malaysia) Thor Chuan Leong	(Thailand) Noppadon Noppachorn
2011	(Indonesia) Palembang	(Thailand) Thepchaiya Un-Nooh	(Singapore) Tommy Ang Boon Chin	(Malaysia) Thor Chuan Leong
2011	(Indonesia) Palembang	(Thailand) Thepchaiya Un-Nooh	(Singapore) Tommy Ang Boon Chin	(Myanmar) Win Khaing Min Aye
2013	(Myanmar) Naypyidaw	(Thailand) Issara Kachaiwong	(Myanmar) Win Ko Ko	(Malaysia) Thor Chuan Leong
2013	(Myanmar) Naypyidaw	(Thailand) Issara Kachaiwong	(Myanmar) Win Ko Ko	(Malaysia) Moh Keen Hoo
2015	Singapore	(Malaysia) Thor Chuan Leong	(Myanmar) Htet Ko	(Philippines) Michael Mengorio
2015	Singapore	(Malaysia) Thor Chuan Leong	(Myanmar) Htet Ko	(Singapore) Tommy Ang Boon Chin
2017	(Malaysia) Kuala Lumpur	(Laos) Siththideth Sakbieng	(Thailand) Phaitoon Phonbun	(Laos) Suriya Minalavong
2017	(Malaysia) Kuala Lumpur	(Laos) Siththideth Sakbieng	(Thailand) Phaitoon Phonbun	(Myanmar) Ko Htet
2019	(Philippines) Manila	(Thailand) Kritsanut Lertsattayathorn	(Malaysia) Moh Keen Hoo	(Philippines) Jeffrey Roda
2019	(Philippines) Manila	(Thailand) Kritsanut Lertsattayathorn	(Malaysia) Moh Keen Hoo	(Laos) Siththideth Sakbieng
2021	(Vietnam) Hanoi	(Thailand) Wattana Pu-Ob-Orm	(Malaysia) Lim Kok Leong	(Myanmar) Aung Phyo
2021	(Vietnam) Hanoi	(Thailand) Wattana Pu-Ob-Orm	(Malaysia) Lim Kok Leong	(Thailand) Passakorn Suwannawat
2023	(Cambodia) Phnom Penh	(Malaysia) Thor Chuan Leong	(Thailand) Sunny Akani	(Malaysia) Lim Kok Leong
2023	(Cambodia) Phnom Penh	(Malaysia) Thor Chuan Leong	(Thailand) Sunny Akani	(Cambodia) Men Sophanith
2025	(Thailand) Nonthaburi	Thailand Passakorn Suwannawat	Thailand Kritsanut Lertsattayathorn	Myanmar Phone Myint Kyaw
2025	(Thailand) Nonthaburi	Thailand Passakorn Suwannawat	Thailand Kritsanut Lertsattayathorn	Malaysia Thor Chuan Leong

==== Snooker Doubles ====
Year	Location	Gold	Silver	Bronze
1987	(Thailand) Jakarta	(Philippines) Efren Reyes (Philippines) Rene Cruz	(Thailand) Udon Khaimuk (Thailand) Sakchai Sim-Ngam	No bronze awarded
1991	(Philippines) Manila	Thailand	Philippines	Indonesia
1995	(Thailand) Chiang Mai	(Malaysia) Chong Tin Sam (Malaysia) Ng Ann Seng	(Philippines) Marlon Manalo (Philippines) Joven Alba	(Thailand) Praprut Chaithanasakun (Thailand) Preecha Sae Be
1999	(Brunei) Bandar Seri Begawan	(Thailand) Noppadon Noppachorn (Thailand) Phaitoon Phonbun	(Malaysia) Chong Tin Sam (Malaysia) Ooi Chin Kay	(Singapore) Keith E Boon (Singapore) Bernard Tey Choon Kiat
2001	(Malaysia) Kuala Lumpur	(Thailand) Praprut Chaithanasakun (Thailand) Somporn Kunthawung	(Philippines) Marlon Manalo (Philippines) Benjamin Guevarra	(Indonesia) Sayumin Teng (Indonesia) Teng Khee Shien
2003	(Vietnam) Ho Chi Minh City	(Singapore) Keith E Boon (Singapore) Alex Puan Yi Wei	(Malaysia) Lee Poh Soon (Malaysia) Moh Keen Hoo	(Thailand) Phaitoon Phonbun (Thailand) Somporn Kunthawung
2005	(Philippines) Manila	(Thailand) Phaitoon Phonbun (Thailand) Issara Kachaiwong	(Singapore) Keith E Boon (Singapore) Alex Puan Yi Wei	(Malaysia) Lee Hwa Meng (Malaysia) Moh Keen Hoo
2007	(Thailand) Nakhon Ratchasima	(Thailand) Atthasit Mahitthi (Thailand) Phaitoon Phonbun	(Malaysia) Moh Keen Hoo (Malaysia) Yong Kein Foot	(Philippines) Benjamin Jr Guevarra (Philippines) James Al Ortega
2009	(Laos) Vientiane	(Singapore) Tommy Ang Boon Chin (Singapore) Marvin Lim Chun Kiat	(Malaysia) Thor Chuan Leong (Malaysia) Chee Wei Lai	(Thailand) Issara Kachaiwong (Thailand) Phaitoon Phonbun
2011	(Thailand) Palembang	(Malaysia) Thor Chuan Leong (Malaysia) Chong Tin Sam	(Singapore) Marvin Lim Chun Kiat (Singapore) Tommy Ang Boon Chin	(Myanmar) Win Khaing Min Aye (Myanmar) Win Ko Ko
2011	(Thailand) Palembang	(Malaysia) Thor Chuan Leong (Malaysia) Chong Tin Sam	(Singapore) Marvin Lim Chun Kiat (Singapore) Tommy Ang Boon Chin	(Thailand) Thanawat Thirapongpaiboon (Thailand) Noppon Saengkham
2015	Singapore	(Malaysia) Moh Keen Hoo (Malaysia) Thor Chuan Leong	(Thailand) Kritsanut Lertsattayathorn (Thailand) Ratchayothin Yotharuck	(Philippines) Alvin Barbero (Philippines) Michael Mengorio
2015	Singapore	(Malaysia) Moh Keen Hoo (Malaysia) Thor Chuan Leong	(Thailand) Kritsanut Lertsattayathorn (Thailand) Ratchayothin Yotharuck	(Singapore) Marvin Lim Chun Kiat (Singapore) Bernard Tey Choon Kiat
2017	(Malaysia) Kuala Lumpur	(Singapore) Chan Keng Kwang (Singapore) Bernard Tey Choon Kiat	(Thailand) Issara Kachaiwong (Thailand) Phaitoon Phonbun	(Malaysia) Moh Keen Hoo (Malaysia) Thor Chuan Leong
2017	(Malaysia) Kuala Lumpur	(Singapore) Chan Keng Kwang (Singapore) Bernard Tey Choon Kiat	(Thailand) Issara Kachaiwong (Thailand) Phaitoon Phonbun	(Myanmar) Aung Phyo (Myanmar) Ko Htet
2019	(Philippines) Manila	(Malaysia) Moh Keen Hoo (Malaysia) Lim Kok Leong	(Philippines) Alvin Barbero (Philippines) Jefrey Roda	(Singapore) Kingsley Ang Tian Yi (Singapore) Marvin Lim Chun Kiat
2019	(Philippines) Manila	(Malaysia) Moh Keen Hoo (Malaysia) Lim Kok Leong	(Philippines) Alvin Barbero (Philippines) Jefrey Roda	(Myanmar) Ko Htet (Myanmar) Thet Min Lin
2023	(Cambodia) Phnom Penh	(Cambodia) Men Sophanith (Cambodia) Suon Chhay	(Malaysia) Lim Kok Leong (Malaysia) Moh Keen Hoo	(Indonesia) Gebby Adi Wibawa Putra (Indonesia) Dhendy Khristanto
2023	(Cambodia) Phnom Penh	(Cambodia) Men Sophanith (Cambodia) Suon Chhay	(Malaysia) Lim Kok Leong (Malaysia) Moh Keen Hoo	(Myanmar) Nay Min Tun (Myanmar) Phone Myint Kyaw

==== Snooker Team ====
Year	Location	Gold	Silver	Bronze
1987	(Indonesia) Jakarta	Thailand	(Singapore) Benjamin Lui Yew Keong (Singapore) Lim Koon Guan (Singapore) Thomas Ang Chick Hong (Singapore) William Ong Boon Seng	(Philippines) Oscar Camoro (Philippines) Felimon de Leon (Philippines) Rene Cruz (Philippines) Efren Reyes
1991	(Philippines) Manila			(Philippines) Efren Reyes (Philippines) Marlon Manalo
1993	Singapore	(Philippines) Leonardo Andam (Philippines) Marlon Manalo (Philippines) Luis Saberdo	(Singapore) Adrian Tan Beng Huat (Singapore) Tan Tiong Boon (Singapore) Ricky Chew Kok Hwa	Thailand
1995	(Thailand) Chiang Mai	(Malaysia) Chong Tin Sam (Malaysia) Liew Kitt Fatt (Malaysia) Yong Kien Foot	(Thailand) Praprut Chaithanasakun (Thailand) Somporn Kanthawang (Thailand) Sakchai Sim Ngam	Singapore
1997	(Indonesia) Jakarta	(Thailand) Kwan Poomjang (Thailand) Phaitoon Phonbun (Thailand) Anan Terananon	(Indonesia) Sayumin Teng (Indonesia) William Ipaenen (Indonesia) Rudy Sulaeman	(Philippines) Marlon Manalo (Philippines) Benjamin Guevarra (Philippines) Joven Alba
1999	(Brunei) Bandar Seri Begawan	(Thailand) Noppadon Noppachorn (Thailand) Phaitoon Phonbun (Thailand) Atthasit Mahitthi (Thailand) Phirom Ritthiprasong	(Malaysia) Chong Tin Sam (Malaysia) Ooi Chin Kay (Malaysia) Ng Ann Seng (Malaysia) Lim Soon Tut	(Philippines) Marlon Manalo (Philippines) Benjamin Guevarra (Philippines) Joven Alba (Philippines) Luis Saberdo
2001	(Malaysia) Kuala Lumpur	(Thailand) Supoj Saenla (Thailand) Somporn Kanthawang (Thailand) Chatchawan Rutphae (Thailand) Praprut Chaithanasakun	(Philippines) Marlon Manalo (Philippines) Benjamin Guevarra (Philippines) James Ortega (Philippines) Felipe Tauro	(Malaysia) Chong Tin Sam (Malaysia) Ooi Chin Kay (Malaysia) Ng Ann Seng (Malaysia) Yong Kien Foot
2003	(Vietnam) Ho Chi Minh City	(Thailand) Phaitoon Phonbun (Thailand) Noppadon Noppachorn	(Malaysia) Lee Poh Soon (Malaysia) Moh Keen Hoo (Malaysia) Lee Hwa Meng	(Philippines) James Ortega (Philippines) Marlon Manalo
2005	(Philippines) Manila	(Philippines) Alex Pagulayan (Philippines) Joven Alba (Philippines) Leonardo Andam	(Thailand) Nitiwat Kanjanasri (Thailand) Phaitoon Phonbun (Thailand) Supoj Saenla	(Indonesia) Rudy Sulaeman (Indonesia) Bambang Saputra
2007	(Thailand) Nakhon Ratchasima	(Thailand) Jantad Pramual (Thailand) Phaitoon Phonbun (Thailand) Noppadol Sangnil	(Malaysia) Moh Loon Hong (Malaysia) Thor Chuan Leong (Malaysia) Yong Kein Foot	(Singapore) Keith E Boon (Singapore) Peter Gilchrist (Singapore) Marvin Lim Chun Kiat
2025	(Thailand) Nonthaburi	Thailand Passakorn Suwannawat Kritsanut Lertsattayathorn Nattanapong Chaikul	Laos Suriya Minalavong Phonesavanh Xaphakdy Sitthideth Sakbieng	Malaysia Thor Chuan Leong Lim Kok Leong Moh Keen Hoo
2025	(Thailand) Nonthaburi	Thailand Passakorn Suwannawat Kritsanut Lertsattayathorn Nattanapong Chaikul	Laos Suriya Minalavong Phonesavanh Xaphakdy Sitthideth Sakbieng	Myanmar Kyaw Phone Myint Phyo Aung Aung Myo Thura

==== 1 Cushion Billiards Singles ====
Year	Location	Gold	Silver	Bronze
1997	(Indonesia) Jakarta	(Indonesia) Tan Kiong An	(Indonesia) Sunar Hindarta	(Vietnam) Le Phuoc Loi
2003	(Vietnam) Ho Chi Minh City	(Vietnam) Le Phuoc Loi	(Vietnam) Dang Dinh Tien	(Philippines) Efren Reyes
2005	(Philippines) Manila	(Vietnam) Nguyen Thanh Binh	(Vietnam) Le Phuoc Loi	(Philippines) Reynaldo Grandea
2007	(Thailand) Nakhon Ratchasima	(Vietnam) Duong Anh Vu	(Vietnam) Nguyen Si Tuong	(Indonesia) Tan Kiong An
2009	(Laos) Vientiane	(Vietnam) Dang Dinh Tien	(Vietnam) Cao Tranh Truc	(Indonesia) Tan Kiong An
2011	(Indonesia) Palembang	(Vietnam) Ma Minh Cam	(Philippines) Francisco Dela Cruz	(Philippines) Efren Reyes
2011	(Indonesia) Palembang	(Vietnam) Ma Minh Cam	(Philippines) Francisco Dela Cruz	(Vietnam) Nguyen Thanh Long
2013	(Myanmar) Naypyidaw	(Vietnam) Dang Dinh Tien	(Vietnam) Ma Minh Cam	(Philippines) Efren Reyes
2013	(Myanmar) Naypyidaw	(Vietnam) Dang Dinh Tien	(Vietnam) Ma Minh Cam	(Philippines) Francisco Dela Cruz
2015	Singapore	(Vietnam) Tran Phi Hung	(Vietnam) Ma Minh Cam	(Philippines) Efren Reyes
2015	Singapore	(Vietnam) Tran Phi Hung	(Vietnam) Ma Minh Cam	(Philippines) Francisco Dela Cruz
2019	(Philippines) Manila	(Vietnam) Ngo Dinh Nai	(Vietnam) Pham Canh Phuc	(Philippines) Efren Reyes
2019	(Philippines) Manila	(Vietnam) Ngo Dinh Nai	(Vietnam) Pham Canh Phuc	(Philippines) Francisco Dela Cruz
2021	(Vietnam) Hanoi	(Vietnam) Nguyen Tran Thanh Tu	(Vietnam) Pham Quoc Tuan	(Philippines) Efren Reyes
2021	(Vietnam) Hanoi	(Vietnam) Nguyen Tran Thanh Tu	(Vietnam) Pham Quoc Tuan	(Philippines) Francisco Dela Cruz

==== 3 Cushion Billiards Singles ====
Year	Location	Gold	Silver	Bronze
1997	(Indonesia) Jakarta	(Indonesia) James Lengkang	(Indonesia) Jimmy Aryanto	(Vietnam) Dang Dinh Tien
2003	(Vietnam) Ho Chi Minh City	(Vietnam) Ly The Vinh	(Vietnam) Duong Anh Vu	(Philippines) Reynaldo Grandea
2011	(Indonesia) Palembang	(Vietnam) Nguyen Quoc Nguyen	(Vietnam) Duong Anh Vu	(Philippines) Reynaldo Grandea
2011	(Indonesia) Palembang	(Vietnam) Nguyen Quoc Nguyen	(Vietnam) Duong Anh Vu	(Philippines) Efren Reyes
2021	(Vietnam) Hanoi	(Vietnam) Tran Quyet Chien	(Vietnam) Nguyen Duc Anh Chien	(Thailand) Suriya Suwannasingh
2021	(Vietnam) Hanoi	(Vietnam) Tran Quyet Chien	(Vietnam) Nguyen Duc Anh Chien	(Philippines) Francisco Dela Cruz
2023	(Cambodia) Phnom Penh	(Vietnam) Nguyen Tran Thanh Tu	(Vietnam) Nguyen Duc Anh Chien	(Philippines) Francisco Dela Cruz
2023	(Cambodia) Phnom Penh	(Vietnam) Nguyen Tran Thanh Tu	(Vietnam) Nguyen Duc Anh Chien	(Cambodia) Woo Donghoon

==== 47/1 Balkline Billiards Singles ====
Year	Location	Gold	Silver	Bronze
1987	(Indonesia) Jakarta	(Indonesia) Ananta Sigit Sidharta	(Philippines) Efren Reyes	(Philippines) Francisco Dela Cruz
1997	(Indonesia) Jakarta	(Indonesia) Ananta Sigit Sidharta	(Philippines) Reynaldo Grandea	(Indonesia) Tonny Ho
2003	(Vietnam) Ho Chi Minh City	(Vietnam) Truong Van Anh	(Philippines) Reynaldo Grandea	(Indonesia) Ananta Sigit Sidharta

==== Straight Rail Billiards Singles ====
Year	Location	Gold	Silver	Bronze
1997	(Indonesia) Jakarta	(Vietnam) Ly The Vinh	(Vietnam) Duong Hoang Anh	(Indonesia) Ananta Sigit Sidharta
2003	(Vietnam) Ho Chi Minh City	(Vietnam) Tran Dinh Hoa	(Vietnam) Tran Dinh Tien	(Indonesia) Ananta Sigit Sidharta

==== 6-Red Snooker Singles ====
Year	Location	Gold	Silver	Bronze
2007	(Thailand) Nakhon Ratchasima	(Thailand) Phaitoon Phonbun	(Thailand) Thepchaiya Un-Nooh	(Singapore) Marvin Lim Chun Kiat
2013	(Malaysia) Naypyidaw	(Malaysia) Thor Chuan Leong	(Laos) Sithideth Sakbieng	(Myanmar) Win Khaing Min Aye
2013	(Malaysia) Naypyidaw	(Malaysia) Thor Chuan Leong	(Laos) Sithideth Sakbieng	(Myanmar) Zaw Ye Htut
2021	(Vietnam) Hanoi	(Malaysia) Lim Kok Leong	(Philippines) Jeffrey Roda	(Malaysia) Moh Keen Hoo
2021	(Vietnam) Hanoi	(Malaysia) Lim Kok Leong	(Philippines) Jeffrey Roda	(Thailand) Suchakree Poomjang
2023	(Cambodia) Phnom Penh	(Malaysia) Moh Keen Hoo	(Laos) Sithideth Sakbieng	(Thailand) Poramin Danjirakul
2023	(Cambodia) Phnom Penh	(Malaysia) Moh Keen Hoo	(Laos) Sithideth Sakbieng	(Myanmar) Hein Lwin Moe
2025	(Thailand) Nonthaburi	Malaysia Thor Chuan Leong	Thailand Poramin Danjirakul	Myanmar Nay Min Tun
2025	(Thailand) Nonthaburi	Malaysia Thor Chuan Leong	Thailand Poramin Danjirakul	Philippines Michael Angelo Mengorio

==== 6-Red Snooker Doubles ====
Year	Location	Gold	Silver	Bronze
2013	(Myanmar) Naypyidaw	(Thailand) Issara Kachaiwong (Thailand) Pramual Jantad	(Myanmar) Win Khaing Min Aye (Myanmar) Win Ko Ko	(Malaysia) Thor Chuan Leong (Malaysia) Moh Keen Hoo
2013	(Myanmar) Naypyidaw	(Thailand) Issara Kachaiwong (Thailand) Pramual Jantad	(Myanmar) Win Khaing Min Aye (Myanmar) Win Ko Ko	(Singapore) Tommy Ang Boon Chin (Singapore) Marvin Lim Chun Kiat
2023	(Cambodia) Phnom Penh	(Thailand) Wattana Pu-Ob-Orm (Thailand) Kritsanut Lertsattayathorn	(Laos) Sithideth Sakbieng (Laos) Suriya Minalavong	(Cambodia) Suon Chhay (Cambodia) Thay Tech Hok
2023	(Cambodia) Phnom Penh	(Thailand) Wattana Pu-Ob-Orm (Thailand) Kritsanut Lertsattayathorn	(Laos) Sithideth Sakbieng (Laos) Suriya Minalavong	(Malaysia) Lim Kok Leong (Malaysia) Moh Keen Hoo

==== 6-Red Snooker Team ====
Year	Location	Gold	Silver	Bronze
2025	(Thailand) Nonthaburi	Malaysia Thor Chuan Leong Lim Kok Leong Moh Keen Hoo	Philippines Basil Hassan Al-Shajjar Michael Angelo Mengorio Alvin Barbero	Singapore Jia Jun Ong Keng Kwang Chan
2025	(Thailand) Nonthaburi	Malaysia Thor Chuan Leong Lim Kok Leong Moh Keen Hoo	Philippines Basil Hassan Al-Shajjar Michael Angelo Mengorio Alvin Barbero	Indonesia Dhendy Krhistanto Gebby Putra Marlando Sihombing

==== 8 Ball Singles ====
Year	Location	Gold	Silver	Bronze
1987	(Indonesia) Jakarta	(Philippines) Efren Reyes	(Philippines) Jose Parica	No bronze awarded
2001	(Malaysia) Kuala Lumpur	(Philippines) Lee Vann Corteza	(Philippines) Efren Reyes	(Singapore) Bernard Tey Choon Kiat
2003	(Vietnam) Ho Chi Minh City	(Philippines) Lee Vann Corteza	(Malaysia) Ibrahim Bin Amir	(Singapore) Bernard Tey Choon Kiat
2005	(Philippines) Manila	(Philippines) Alex Pagulayan	(Philippines) Lee Vann Corteza	(Singapore) Bernard Tey Choon Kiat
2007	(Thailand) Nakhon Ratchasima	(Philippines) Ronato Alcano	(Singapore) Bernard Tey Choon Kiat	(Malaysia) Ibrahim Bin Amir
2009	(Laos) Vientiane	(Philippines) Ronato Alcano	(Philippines) Gandy Valle	(Indonesia) Ricky Yang
2011	(Indonesia) Palembang	(Philippines) Dennis Orcollo	(Indonesia) Ricky Yang	(Vietnam) Nguyen Phuong Thao
2011	(Indonesia) Palembang	(Philippines) Dennis Orcollo	(Indonesia) Ricky Yang	(Indonesia) Muhammad Zulfikiri

==== 8 Ball Doubles ====
Year	Location	Gold	Silver	Bronze
2005	(Philippines) Manila	(Philippines) Lee Vann Corteza (Philippines) Antonio Gabica	(Vietnam) Nguyen Phuc Long (Vietnam) Nguyen Thanh Nam	(Singapore) Bernard Tey Choon Kiat (Singapore) Chan Keng Kwang

==== 9 Ball Singles ====
Year	Location	Gold	Silver	Bronze
1991	(Philippines) Manila	(Philippines) Leonardo Andam	(Indonesia) Sayumin Teng	No bronze awarded
1993	Singapore	(Malaysia) Chong Tin Sam	(Philippines) Marlon Manalo	(Thailand) Phaitoon Phonbun
1995	(Thailand) Chiang Mai	(Thailand) Phaitoon Phonbun	(Thailand) Chachawan Rutphae	(Malaysia) Ng Ann Seng
1997	(Indonesia) Jakarta	(Malaysia) Ooi Fook Yuen	(Indonesia) Robby Suarly	(Philippines) Eduardo Villanueva
1999	(Brunei) Bandar Seri Begawan	(Philippines) Lee Vann Corteza	(Philippines) Leonardo Andam	(Thailand) Surathep Phoochalam
2001	(Malaysia) Kuala Lumpur	(Philippines) Antonio Lining	(Philippines) Lee Vann Corteza	(Thailand) Surathep Phoochalam
2003	(Vietnam) Ho Chi Minh City	(Indonesia) Muhammad Junarto	(Indonesia) Nurdin	(Philippines) Efren Reyes
2005	(Philippines) Manila	(Singapore) Chan Keng Kwang	(Vietnam) Lương Chí Dũng	(Malaysia) Ooi Fook Yuen
2007	(Thailand) Nakhon Ratchasima	(Indonesia) Ricky Yang	(Philippines) Lee Vann Corteza	(Philippines) Antonio Gabica
2009	(Laos) Vientiane	(Vietnam) Nguyen Phuc Long	(Indonesia) Ricky Yang	(Philippines) Dennis Orcollo
2011	(Indonesia) Palembang	(Indonesia) Ricky Yang	(Indonesia) Irsal Nasution	(Philippines) Francisco Mertado
2011	(Indonesia) Palembang	(Indonesia) Ricky Yang	(Indonesia) Irsal Nasution	(Vietnam) Do The Kien
2013	(Myanmar) Naypyidaw	(Indonesia) Ricky Yang	(Malaysia) Tan Kah Thiam	(Thailand) Nitiwat Kanjanasri
2013	(Myanmar) Naypyidaw	(Indonesia) Ricky Yang	(Malaysia) Tan Kah Thiam	(Myanmar) Aung Moe Thu
2015	Singapore	(Philippines) Dennis Orcollo	(Myanmar) Maung Maung	(Philippines) Carlo Biado
2015	Singapore	(Philippines) Dennis Orcollo	(Myanmar) Maung Maung	(Vietnam) Do Hoang Quan
2017	(Malaysia) Kuala Lumpur	(Philippines) Carlo Biado	(Vietnam) Duong Quoc Hoang	(Vietnam) Nguyen Anh Tuan
2017	(Malaysia) Kuala Lumpur	(Philippines) Carlo Biado	(Vietnam) Duong Quoc Hoang	(Philippines) Johann Chua
2019	(Philippines) Manila	(Myanmar) Phone Myint Kyaw	(Vietnam) Do The Kien	(Singapore) Aloysius Yapp
2019	(Philippines) Manila	(Myanmar) Phone Myint Kyaw	(Vietnam) Do The Kien	(Singapore) Toh Lian Han
2021	(Vietnam) Hanoi	(Philippines) Johann Chua	(Philippines) Carlo Biado	(Singapore) Aloysius Yapp
2021	(Vietnam) Hanoi	(Philippines) Johann Chua	(Philippines) Carlo Biado	(Singapore) Toh Lian Han
2023	(Cambodia) Phnom Penh	(Myanmar) Phone Myint Kyaw	(Singapore) Aloysius Yapp	(Vietnam) Ta Van Linh
2023	(Cambodia) Phnom Penh	(Myanmar) Phone Myint Kyaw	(Singapore) Aloysius Yapp	(Vietnam) Nguyen Anh Tuan

==== 9 Ball Doubles ====
Year	Location	Gold	Silver	Bronze
1995	(Thailand) Chiang Mai	(Philippines) Marlon Manalo (Philippines) Joven Alba	(Indonesia) Sayumin Teng (Indonesia) Widi Harsoyo	(Malaysia) Chong Tin Sam (Malaysia) Ooi Fook Yuen
1999	(Brunei) Bandar Seri Begawan	(Indonesia) Robby Suarly (Indonesia) Alwi Dodong	(Singapore) Tan Tiong Boon (Singapore) Ricky Chong Wei Onn	(Philippines) Romeo Villanueva (Philippines) Gandy Valle
2001	(Malaysia) Kuala Lumpur	(Indonesia) Muhammad Junarto (Indonesia) Nurdin	(Philippines) Warren Kiamco (Philippines) Vivancio Tanio	(Singapore) Tan Tiong Boon (Singapore) William Ang Boon Lay
2003	(Vietnam) Ho Chi Minh City	(Philippines) Lee Vann Corteza (Philippines) Warren Kiamco	(Indonesia) Muhammad Junarto (Indonesia) Nurdin	(Vietnam) Nguyen Phuc Long (Vietnam) Nguyen Thanh Nam
2005	(Philippines) Manila	(Philippines) Alex Pagulayan (Philippines) Dennis Orcollo	(Vietnam) Lương Chí Dũng (Vietnam) Nguyen Thanh Nam	(Singapore) Toh Lian Han (Singapore) Chan Keng Kwang
2007	(Thailand) Nakhon Ratchasima	(Philippines) Antonio Gabica (Philippines) Marlon Manalo	(Singapore) Chan Keng Kwang (Singapore) Toh Lian Han	(Malaysia) Ibrahim Bin Amir (Malaysia) Lee Poh Soon
2009	(Laos) Vientiane	(Vietnam) Do Hoang Quan (Vietnam) Lương Chí Dũng	(Indonesia) Muhammad Zulfikri (Indonesia) Ricky Yang	(Singapore) Toh Lian Han (Singapore) Chan Keng Kwang
2015	Singapore	(Philippines) Carlo Biado (Philippines) Warren Kiamco	(Vietnam) Do Hoang Quan (Vietnam) Nguyen Anh Tuan	(Myanmar) Maung Maung (Myanmar) Thu Aung Moe
2015	Singapore	(Philippines) Carlo Biado (Philippines) Warren Kiamco	(Vietnam) Do Hoang Quan (Vietnam) Nguyen Anh Tuan	(Singapore) Toh Lian Han (Singapore) Aloysius Yapp
2017	(Malaysia) Kuala Lumpur	(Singapore) Toh Lian Han (Singapore) Aloysius Yapp	(Myanmar) Maung Maung (Myanmar) Aung Moe Thu	(Philippines) Warren Kiamco (Philippines) Dennis Orcollo
2017	(Malaysia) Kuala Lumpur	(Singapore) Toh Lian Han (Singapore) Aloysius Yapp	(Myanmar) Maung Maung (Myanmar) Aung Moe Thu	(Indonesia) Arun (Indonesia) Jefry Zen
2019	(Philippines) Manila	(Myanmar) Phone Myint Kyaw (Myanmar) Aung Moe Thu	(Singapore) Toh Lian Han (Singapore) Aloysius Yapp	(Philippines) Jeffrey Ignacio (Philippines) Warren Kiamco
2019	(Philippines) Manila	(Myanmar) Phone Myint Kyaw (Myanmar) Aung Moe Thu	(Singapore) Toh Lian Han (Singapore) Aloysius Yapp	(Philippines) Carlo Biado (Philippines) Johann Chua
2023	(Cambodia) Phnom Penh	(Myanmar) Phone Myint Kyaw (Myanmar) Thaw Zin Htet	(Malaysia) Darryl Chia Soo Yew (Malaysia) Muhammad Almie Yakup	(Thailand) Preecha Boonmoung (Thailand) Sompol Saetang
2023	(Cambodia) Phnom Penh	(Myanmar) Phone Myint Kyaw (Myanmar) Thaw Zin Htet	(Malaysia) Darryl Chia Soo Yew (Malaysia) Muhammad Almie Yakup	(Philippines) Carlo Biado (Philippines) Johann Chua

==== 9 Ball Team ====
Year	Location	Gold	Silver	Bronze
1991	(Philippines) Manila	(Philippines) Leonardo Andam (Philippines) Marlon Manalo (Philippines) Albrecht Lapena (Philippines) Jorge Dacer	(Singapore) Freddie Soh Chye Hian (Singapore) Tan Tiong Boon (Singapore) Brian Koh Kim Swee (Singapore) Richard Soh	No bronze awarded
1993	Singapore	(Malaysia) Chong Tin Sam (Malaysia) Ng Ann Seng (Malaysia) Ooi Chin Kay	(Indonesia) Robby Suarly (Indonesia) Alwi Dodong (Indonesia) Teddy Sutansya	(Philippines) Leonardo Andam (Philippines) Marlon Manalo (Philippines) Luis Saberdo
1995	(Thailand) Chiang Mai	(Singapore) Randy Wong Siew Loong (Singapore) Sonny Tan Lai Huat (Singapore) Bernard Tey Choon Kiat	(Thailand) Phaitoon Phonbun (Thailand) Surathep Phoochalam (Thailand) Chachawan Rutphae	Malaysia
1997	(Indonesia) Jakarta	(Malaysia) Ooi Fook Yuen (Malaysia) Chong Tin Sam (Malaysia) Ng Ann Seng	Indonesia	(Philippines) Florencio Banar (Philippines) Victor Arpilleda (Philippines) Eduardo Villanueva
1999	(Brunei) Bandar Seri Begawan	(Philippines) Rodolfo Luat (Philippines) Gandy Valle (Philippines) Romeo Villanueva (Philippines) Lee Vann Corteza	(Thailand) Surathep Phoochalam (Thailand) Amnuayporn Chotipong (Thailand) Worawit Suriyasriwan (Thailand) Montree Chayapiwat	(Indonesia) Robby Suarly (Indonesia) Alwi Dodong (Indonesia) Nurdin (Indonesia) Edi Hartono

==== 10 Ball Singles ====
Year	Location	Gold	Silver	Bronze
2013	(Myanmar) Naypyidaw	(Philippines) Dennis Orcollo	(Philippines) Carlo Biado	(Vietnam) Nguyen Anh Tuan
2013	(Myanmar) Naypyidaw	(Philippines) Dennis Orcollo	(Philippines) Carlo Biado	(Vietnam) Dang Thanh Kien
2019	(Philippines) Manila	(Philippines) Dennis Orcollo	(Vietnam) Do The Kien	(Indonesia) Ismail Kadir
2019	(Philippines) Manila	(Philippines) Dennis Orcollo	(Vietnam) Do The Kien	(Singapore) Aloysius Yapp
2021	(Vietnam) Hanoi	(Philippines) Carlo Biado	(Philippines) Johann Chua	(Singapore) Sharik Aslam Sayed
2021	(Vietnam) Hanoi	(Philippines) Carlo Biado	(Philippines) Johann Chua	(Singapore) Aloysius Yapp

==== Rotation Singles ====
Year	Location	Gold	Silver	Bronze
1991	(Philippines) Manila	(Philippines) Leonardo Andam	(Philippines) Luis Saberdo	No bronze awarded
1993	Singapore	(Thailand) Anurat Wongjan	(Singapore) Tan Tiong Boon	(Thailand) Ophas Suwannarat
1995	(Thailand) Chiang Mai	(Thailand) Ophas Suwannarat	(Malaysia) Ng Ann Seng	(Thailand) Anurat Wongjan
1997	(Indonesia) Jakarta	(Philippines) Victor Arpilleda	(Malaysia) Chong Tin Sam	(Singapore) Tan Tiong Boon
1999	(Brunei) Bandar Seri Begawan	(Philippines) Efren Reyes	(Philippines) Warren Kiamco	(Thailand) Kwan Poomjang
2001	(Malaysia) Kuala Lumpur	(Philippines) Warren Kiamco	(Philippines) Efren Reyes	(Indonesia) Muhammad Junarto
2005	(Philippines) Manila	(Philippines) Ronato Alcano	(Philippines) Antonio Gabica	(Indonesia) Muhammad Junarto

==== Rotation Doubles ====
Year	Location	Gold	Silver	Bronze
1995	(Thailand) Chiang Mai	(Malaysia) Ng Ann Seng (Malaysia) Liew Kitt Fatt	(Malaysia) Chong Tin Sam (Malaysia) Ooi Fook Yuen	(Indonesia) William Ipaenen (Indonesia) Hadi Suryo
1999	(Brunei) Bandar Seri Begawan	(Philippines) Efren Reyes (Philippines) Warren Kiamco	(Thailand) Kwan Poomjang (Thailand) Noppadol Sangnil	(Singapore) Tan Tiong Boon (Singapore) William Ang Boon Lay
2005	(Philippines) Manila	(Philippines) Ronato Alcano (Philippines) Leonardo Andam	(Thailand) Tepwin Arunnath (Thailand) Amnuayporn Chotipong	(Malaysia) Ibrahim Bin Amir (Malaysia) Ooi Fook Yuen

==== Rotation Team ====
Year	Location	Gold	Silver	Bronze
1991	(Philippines) Manila	(Philippines) Efren Reyes (Philippines) Luis Saberdo (Philippines) Leonardo Andam (Philippines) Marlon Manalo	(Singapore) Adrian Tan Beng Huat (Singapore) Brian Koh Kim Swee (Singapore) Tan Tiong Boon (Singapore) Thomas Ang Chick Hong	No bronze awarded
1993	Singapore	Thailand	(Philippines) Leonardo Andam (Philippines) Marlon Manalo (Philippines) Romeo Villanueva	Malaysia
1995	(Thailand) Chiang Mai	(Malaysia) Chong Tin Sam (Malaysia) Ng Ann Seng (Malaysia) Liew Kitt Fatt	(Thailand) Amnuayporn Chotipong (Thailand) Ophas Suwannarat (Thailand) Anurat Wongjan	Singapore
1997	(Indonesia) Jakarta	Indonesia	Thailand	(Philippines) Jose Dacer (Philippines) Victor Arpilleda (Philippines) Eduardo Villanueva

=== Women ===
==== 1 Cushion Billiards Singles ====
Year	Location	Gold	Silver	Bronze
2023	(Cambodia) Phnom Penh	(Vietnam) Le Thi Ngoc Hue	(Vietnam) Phung Kien Tuong	(Cambodia) Sruong Pheavy
2023	(Cambodia) Phnom Penh	(Vietnam) Le Thi Ngoc Hue	(Vietnam) Phung Kien Tuong	(Thailand) Panchaya Channoi

==== 3 Cushion Billiards Singles ====
Year	Location	Gold	Silver	Bronze
2023	(Cambodia) Phnom Penh	(Cambodia) Sruong Pheavy	(Vietnam) Nguyen Hoang Yen Nhi	(Vietnam) Phung Kien Tuong
2023	(Cambodia) Phnom Penh	(Cambodia) Sruong Pheavy	(Vietnam) Nguyen Hoang Yen Nhi	(Thailand) Santhinee Jaisuekul

==== 8 Ball Singles ====
Year	Location	Gold	Silver	Bronze
2005	(Philippines) Manila	(Philippines) Rubilen Amit	(Singapore) Hoe Shu Wah	(Singapore) Charlene Chai Zeet Huey
2007	(Thailand) Nakhon Ratchasima	(Indonesia) Angeline Magdalena Ticoalu	(Thailand) Santhinee Jaisuekul	(Philippines) Rubilen Amit
2009	(Laos) Vientiane	(Philippines) Rubilen Amit	(Indonesia) Angeline Magdalena Ticoalu	(Malaysia) Esther Kwan
2011	(Indonesia) Palembang	(Philippines) Iris Ranola	(Indonesia) Amanda Rahayu	(Indonesia) Angelina Magdalena Ticoalu
2011	(Indonesia) Palembang	(Philippines) Iris Ranola	(Indonesia) Amanda Rahayu	(Singapore) Hoe Shu Wah

==== 9 Ball Singles ====
Year	Location	Gold	Silver	Bronze
2005	(Philippines) Manila	(Philippines) Rubilen Amit	(Malaysia) Suhana Dewi Sabtu	(Singapore) Hoe Shu Wah
2007	(Thailand) Nakhon Ratchasima	(Philippines) Rubilen Amit	(Indonesia) Angeline Magdalena Ticoalu	(Thailand) Santhinee Jaisuekul
2009	(Laos) Vientiane	(Philippines) Rubilen Amit	(Singapore) Charlene Chai	(Philippines) Iris Ranola
2011	(Indonesia) Palembang	(Philippines) Iris Ranola	(Philippines) Rubilen Amit	(Singapore) Hoe Shu Wah
2011	(Indonesia) Palembang	(Philippines) Iris Ranola	(Philippines) Rubilen Amit	(Vietnam) Huynh Thi Ngoc Huy
2013	(Myanmar) Naypyidaw	(Indonesia) Angelina Magdalena Ticoalu	(Philippines) Rubilen Amit	(Vietnam) Doan Thi Ngoc Le
2013	(Myanmar) Naypyidaw	(Indonesia) Angelina Magdalena Ticoalu	(Philippines) Rubilen Amit	(Myanmar) Ami Aung
2015	Singapore	(Philippines) Chezka Centeno	(Philippines) Rubilen Amit	(Myanmar) Aung Aye Mi
2015	Singapore	(Philippines) Chezka Centeno	(Philippines) Rubilen Amit	(Thailand) Siraphat Chitchomnart
2017	(Malaysia) Kuala Lumpur	(Philippines) Chezka Centeno	(Philippines) Rubilen Amit	(Malaysia) Klaudia Djajalie
2017	(Malaysia) Kuala Lumpur	(Philippines) Chezka Centeno	(Philippines) Rubilen Amit	(Malaysia) Suhana Dewi Sabtu
2019	(Philippines) Manila	(Philippines) Rubilen Amit	(Philippines) Chezka Centeno	(Singapore) Jessica Tan
2019	(Philippines) Manila	(Philippines) Rubilen Amit	(Philippines) Chezka Centeno	(Thailand) Vutthiphan Kongkaket
2021	(Vietnam) Hanoi	(Philippines) Rubilen Amit	(Singapore) Jessica Tan	(Vietnam) Bui Xuan Vang
2021	(Vietnam) Hanoi	(Philippines) Rubilen Amit	(Singapore) Jessica Tan	(Vietnam) Nguyen Bich Tram

==== 9 Ball Doubles ====
Year	Location	Gold	Silver	Bronze
2019	(Philippines) Manila	(Philippines) Chezka Centeno (Philippines) Rubilen Amit	(Indonesia) Fathrah Masum (Indonesia) Nony Krystianti Andilah	(Singapore) Jessica Tan (Singapore) Suvene Ng
2019	(Philippines) Manila	(Philippines) Chezka Centeno (Philippines) Rubilen Amit	(Indonesia) Fathrah Masum (Indonesia) Nony Krystianti Andilah	(Indonesia) Angeline Magdalena Ticoalu (Indonesia) Silviana Lu

==== 10 Ball Singles ====
Year	Location	Gold	Silver	Bronze
2013	(Malaysia) Naypyidaw	(Philippines) Rubilen Amit	(Indonesia) Angelina Magdalena Ticoalu	(Philippines) Iris Ranola
2013	(Malaysia) Naypyidaw	(Philippines) Rubilen Amit	(Indonesia) Angelina Magdalena Ticoalu	(Vietnam) Thi Ngoc Huyen Huynh
2019	(Philippines) Manila	(Philippines) Chezka Centeno	(Philippines) Rubilen Amit	(Myanmar) A Mi Aung
2019	(Philippines) Manila	(Philippines) Chezka Centeno	(Philippines) Rubilen Amit	(Myanmar) Thandar Maung
2021	(Vietnam) Hanoi	(Philippines) Rubilen Amit	(Philippines) Chezka Centeno	(Thailand) Pennipa Nakyul
2021	(Vietnam) Hanoi	(Philippines) Rubilen Amit	(Philippines) Chezka Centeno	(Vietnam) Bui Xuan Vang

==== 6-Red Snooker Singles ====
Year	Location	Gold	Silver	Bronze
2007	(Thailand) Nakhon Ratchasima	(Thailand) Santhinee Jaisuekul	(Philippines) Mary Ann Basas	(Philippines) Iris Ranola
2025	(Thailand) Nonthaburi	Thailand Baipat Siripaporn	Thailand Nutcharut Wongharuthai	Malaysia Bronica Kai Yin Song
2025	(Thailand) Nonthaburi	Thailand Baipat Siripaporn	Thailand Nutcharut Wongharuthai	Malaysia Kim Mei Tan

==== 6-Red Snooker Team ====
Year	Location	Gold	Silver	Bronze
2025	(Thailand) Nonthaburi	Thailand Baipat Siripaporn Narucha Phoemphul Ploychompoo Laokiatphong	Indonesia Annabella Putri Yohana Emilia Putri Rahmanda	Malaysia Kim Mei Tan Bronica Kai Yin Song
2025	(Thailand) Nonthaburi	Thailand Baipat Siripaporn Narucha Phoemphul Ploychompoo Laokiatphong	Indonesia Annabella Putri Yohana Emilia Putri Rahmanda	Singapore Chai Zeet Huey Charlene Chua Pei Fen Audrey

==== Snooker Singles ====
Year	Location	Gold	Silver	Bronze
2025	(Thailand) Nonthaburi	Thailand Nutcharut Wongharuthai	Thailand Panchaya Channoi	Indonesia Annabella Putri Yohana
2025	(Thailand) Nonthaburi	Thailand Nutcharut Wongharuthai	Thailand Panchaya Channoi	Laos Daoheuang Sihalath

==== Snooker Team ====
Year	Location	Gold	Silver	Bronze
2025	(Thailand) Nonthaburi	Thailand Panchaya Channoi Nutcharut Wongharuthai Ploychompoo Laokiatphong	Indonesia Annabella Putri Yohana Emilia Putri Rahmanda	Singapore Zeet Huey Charlene Chai Pei Fen Audrey Chua
2025	(Thailand) Nonthaburi	Thailand Panchaya Channoi Nutcharut Wongharuthai Ploychompoo Laokiatphong	Indonesia Annabella Putri Yohana Emilia Putri Rahmanda	Laos Nimith Inthavong Daoheuang Sihalath

== See also ==
- Cue sports at the Asian Games
