= 2003 UK Championship =

2003 Travis Perkins UK Championship
Tournament information
- Dates: 18–30 November 2003
- Venue: Barbican Centre
- City: York
- Country: England
- Organisation: WPBSA
- Format: Ranking event
- Total prize fund: £615,000
- Winner's share: £84,500
- Highest break: Ali Carter (ENG) (143)

Final
- Champion: Matthew Stevens (WAL)
- Runner-up: Stephen Hendry (SCO)
- Score: 10–8

The 2003 UK Championship (officially the 2003 Travis Perkins UK Championship) was a professional ranking snooker tournament that took place between 18 and 30 November 2003 at the Barbican Centre in York, England. The event was broadcast on the BBC between 22 and 30 November 2003 and was the third ranking event of the 2003/2004 season. This marked the first event of three consecutive events sponsored by building merchant Travis Perkins.

Mark Williams was the defending champion, but he lost his last 32 match against Fergal O'Brien.

Matthew Stevens won his first ranking title when by defeating five times UK champion Stephen Hendry 10–8. In the final Hendry failed a 147 attempt, when he missed the yellow while on 120. The highest break of the tournament was 143 made by Ali Carter.

== Tournament summary ==
Defending champion and World Champion Mark Williams was the number 1 seed. The remaining places were allocated to players based on the world rankings.

== Prize fund ==
The breakdown of prize money for this year is shown below:

- Winner: £84,500
- Final: £43,000
- Semi-final: £21,700
- Quarter-final: £11,900
- Last 16: £9,800
- Last 32: £7,850
- Last 48: £4,400
- Last 64: £3,200
- Last 80: £2,250
- Last 96: £1,600
- Stage one highest break: £1,800
- Stage two highest break: £7,500
- Stage one maximum break: £5,000
- Stage two maximum break: £25,000
- Total: £615,000

== Main draw ==
Last 48; Best of 17 frames
29	(England) Mark Selby	8
33	(Republic of Ireland) Fergal O'Brien	9
25	(Scotland) Drew Henry	9
39	(England) Michael Holt	7
24	(Malta) Tony Drago	9
78	(England) Rory McLeod	8
21	(England) Robert Milkins	4
40	(England) Nigel Bond	9
31	(Wales) Anthony Davies	8
41	(Scotland) Stephen Maguire	9
22	(England) Mark King	9
91	(Canada) Alain Robidoux	4
27	(Northern Ireland) Joe Swail	4
38	(Northern Ireland) Gerard Greene	9
32	(Finland) Robin Hull	2
34	(Thailand) James Wattana	9
26	(England) Ian McCulloch	9
47	(England) Stuart Pettman	4
28	(Wales) Dominic Dale	9
(Republic of Ireland) Joe Delaney	3
18	(Scotland) Chris Small	9
62	(England) Andy Hicks	6
20	(England) Anthony Hamilton	7
43	(England) Stuart Bingham	9
23	(England) Dave Harold	9
35	(England) Mark Davis	6
19	(Hong Kong) Marco Fu	1
36	(England) Barry Pinches	9
17	(England) Ali Carter	9
61	(Belgium) Bjorn Haneveer	3
30	(England) John Parrott	9
42	(England) Barry Hawkins	8

Last 32; Best of 17 frames
1	(Wales) Mark Williams	7
33	(Republic of Ireland) Fergal O'Brien	9
15	(England) Jimmy White	9
25	(Scotland) Drew Henry	5
16	(England) Joe Perry	9
24	(Malta) Tony Drago	6
6	(Republic of Ireland) Ken Doherty	7
40	(England) Nigel Bond	9
8	(England) Paul Hunter	9
41	(Scotland) Stephen Maguire	7
12	(England) David Gray	8
22	(England) Mark King	9
9	(Wales) Matthew Stevens	9
38	(Northern Ireland) Gerard Greene	7
4	(Scotland) John Higgins	4
34	(Thailand) James Wattana	9
3	(England) Ronnie O'Sullivan	9
26	(England) Ian McCulloch	3
10	(Scotland) Alan McManus	9
28	(Wales) Dominic Dale	7
14	(Australia) Quinten Hann	9
18	(Scotland) Chris Small	8
7	(England) Peter Ebdon	9
43	(England) Stuart Bingham	2
5	(England) Stephen Lee	9
23	(England) Dave Harold	5
13	(Scotland) Graeme Dott	6
36	(England) Barry Pinches	9
11	(England) Steve Davis	6
17	(England) Ali Carter	9
2	(Scotland) Stephen Hendry	9
30	(England) John Parrott	5

Last 16; Best of 17 frames
33	(Republic of Ireland) Fergal O'Brien	7
15	(England) Jimmy White	9
16	(England) Joe Perry	8
40	(England) Nigel Bond	9
8	(England) Paul Hunter	9
22	(England) Mark King	8
9	(Wales) Matthew Stevens	9
34	(Thailand) James Wattana	6
3	(England) Ronnie O'Sullivan	9
10	(Scotland) Alan McManus	5
14	(Australia) Quinten Hann	9
7	(England) Peter Ebdon	6
5	(England) Stephen Lee	6
36	(England) Barry Pinches	9
17	(England) Ali Carter	8
2	(Scotland) Stephen Hendry	9

Quarter-finals; Best of 17 frames
15	(England) Jimmy White	9
40	(England) Nigel Bond	3
8	(England) Paul Hunter	3
9	(Wales) Matthew Stevens	9
3	(England) Ronnie O'Sullivan	9
14	(Australia) Quinten Hann	3
36	(England) Barry Pinches	3
2	(Scotland) Stephen Hendry	9

Semi-finals; Best of 17 frames
15	(England) Jimmy White	7
9	(Wales) Matthew Stevens	9
3	(England) Ronnie O'Sullivan	4
2	(Scotland) Stephen Hendry	9

Final; Best of 19 frames
9	(Wales) Matthew Stevens	10
2	(Scotland) Stephen Hendry	8

== Final ==
Final: Best of 19 frames. Referee: Colin Brinded. Barbican Centre, York, England, 30 November 2003.
Matthew Stevens (9); Wales	10–8	Stephen Hendry (2); Scotland
Afternoon: 0–79 (68), 0–100 (100), 30–57, 46–77 (65), 71–40 (66), 81–5 (50), 137–0 (137), 99–1 (99); Evening: 76–0 (76), 11–107 (67), 0–94 (93), 0–101 (101), 78–27 (61), 63–61 (Hendry 61), 80–22, 63–59, 0–120 (120), 69–54 (Hendry 53)
137	Highest break	120
1	Century breaks	3
6	50+ breaks	9

== Qualifying ==
Qualifying for the tournament took place at Pontin's in Prestatyn, Wales between 14 and 23 October 2003.

=== Round 1 ===
Best of 17 frames

(England) Andrew Higginson	9–5	(England) Stuart Mann
(England) Luke Fisher	4–9	(Scotland) Gary Thomson
(England) Joe Johnson	w/d–w/o	(England) Carlo Giagnacovo
(England) Paul Wykes	9–8	(Republic of Ireland) Garry Hardiman
(England) Rory McLeod	9–2	(England) Michael Wild
(Republic of Ireland) Colm Gilcreest	8–9	(Australia) Steve Mifsud
(Thailand) Atthasit Mahitthi	9–4	(Wales) Ian Sargeant
(Scotland) Martin Dziewialtowski	9–3	(England) Andy Neck
(England) Peter Lines	5–9	(England) Tom Ford
(Australia) Johl Younger	4–9	(Norway) Kurt Maflin
(England) Tony Jones	9–8	(England) Chris Melling
(Northern Ireland) Terry Murphy	3–9	(Canada) Alain Robidoux
(Wales) Ryan Day	9–4	(Scotland) Steven Bennie
(England) Matthew Couch	9–3	(Wales) Ian Preece
(Republic of Ireland) Leo Fernandez	9–7	(England) Darryn Walker
(England) Ricky Walden	9–2	(England) Martin Gould

(England) Jason Ferguson	9–4	(England) James Leadbetter
(Thailand) Kwan Poomjang	9–5	(Cyprus) Mehmet Husnu
(England) Munraj Pal	7–9	(Republic of Ireland) Joe Delaney
(Northern Ireland) Jason Prince	7–9	(England) Paul Sweeny
(Wales) Lee Walker	8–9	(England) Adrian Rosa
(England) Wayne Brown	5–9	(Wales) Philip Williams
(England) Jamie Cope	9–6	(Northern Ireland) Joe Meara
(England) Bradley Jones	3–9	(China) Ding Junhui
(England) Simon Bedford	7–9	(China) Liu Song
(Scotland) Billy Snaddon	8–9	(England) Stephen Croft
(England) Adrian Gunnell	6–9	(Australia) Neil Robertson
(England) Craig Butler	9–6	(Scotland) Scott MacKenzie
(England) David Gilbert	9–8	(England) Ian Brumby
(England) Andrew Norman	9–6	(Thailand) Supoj Saenla
(Iceland) Kristján Helgason	w/d–w/o	(England) Michael Rhodes
(Wales) Paul Davies	9–3	(England) Luke Simmonds

=== Round 2–4 ===
Round 2 Best of 17 frames
(England) Andrew Higginson	9
(Scotland) Gary Thomson	7
(England) Carlo Giagnacovo	9
(England) Paul Wykes	7
(England) Rory McLeod	9
(Australia) Steve Mifsud	1
(Thailand) Atthasit Mahitthi	9
(Scotland) Martin Dziewialtowski	5
(England) Tom Ford	9
(Norway) Kurt Maflin	5
(England) Tony Jones	8
(Canada) Alain Robidoux	9
(Wales) Ryan Day	9
(England) Matthew Couch	5
(Republic of Ireland) Leo Fernandez	5
(England) Ricky Walden	9
(England) Jason Ferguson	2
(Thailand) Kwan Poomjang	9
(Republic of Ireland) Joe Delaney	9
(England) Paul Sweeny	7
(England) Adrian Rosa	5
(Wales) Philip Williams	9
(England) Jamie Cope	9
(China) Ding Junhui	7
(China) Liu Song	9
(England) Stephen Croft	6
(Australia) Neil Robertson	9
(England) Craig Butler	4
(England) David Gilbert	6
(England) Andrew Norman	9
(England) Michael Rhodes	8
(Wales) Paul Davies	9

Round 3 Best of 17 frames
(Northern Ireland) Patrick Wallace	4
(England) Andrew Higginson	9
(England) Dave Finbow	9
(England) Carlo Giagnacovo	8
(England) Mike Dunn	6
(England) Rory McLeod	9
(England) Rod Lawler	5
(Thailand) Atthasit Mahitthi	9
(England) Shaun Murphy	7
(England) Tom Ford	9
(England) David Roe	6
(Canada) Alain Robidoux	9
(England) Sean Storey	4
(Wales) Ryan Day	9
(Scotland) Marcus Campbell	9
(England) Ricky Walden	8
(England) Nick Dyson	9
(Thailand) Kwan Poomjang	7
(England) Alfie Burden	3
(Republic of Ireland) Joe Delaney	9
(England) Andy Hicks	9
(Wales) Philip Williams	7
(England) Jimmy Michie	7
(England) Jamie Cope	9
(Wales) Darren Morgan	8
(China) Liu Song	9
(Pakistan) Shokat Ali	7
(Australia) Neil Robertson	9
(Belgium) Bjorn Haneveer	9
(England) Andrew Norman	8
(England) Nick Walker	3
(Wales) Paul Davies	9

Round 4 Best of 17 frames
(Republic of Ireland) Fergal O'Brien	9
(England) Andrew Higginson	6
(England) Michael Holt	9
(England) Dave Finbow	1
(Republic of Ireland) Michael Judge	2
(England) Rory McLeod	9
(England) Nigel Bond	9
(Thailand) Atthasit Mahitthi	2
(Scotland) Stephen Maguire	9
(England) Tom Ford	6
(England) Gary Wilkinson	5
(Canada) Alain Robidoux	9
(Northern Ireland) Gerard Greene	9
(Wales) Ryan Day	6
(Thailand) James Wattana	9
(Scotland) Marcus Campbell	3
(England) Stuart Pettman	9
(England) Nick Dyson	4
(Scotland) Jamie Burnett	6
(Republic of Ireland) Joe Delaney	9
(England) Jonathan Birch	2
(England) Andy Hicks	9
(England) Stuart Bingham	9
(England) Jamie Cope	6
(England) Mark Davis	9
(China) Liu Song	4
(England) Barry Pinches	9
(Australia) Neil Robertson	5
(England) Brian Morgan	4
(Belgium) Bjorn Haneveer	9
(England) Barry Hawkins	9
(Wales) Paul Davies	5

== Century breaks ==
=== Televised stage centuries ===
- 143 – Ali Carter
- 140, 138, 137, 134, 126, 125, 121, 115, 109, 104, 103, 100 – Ronnie O'Sullivan
- 137, 104, 101 – Matthew Stevens
- 136 – Joe Perry
- 135, 112 – Dominic Dale
- 135, 111 – Stephen Lee
- 132, 129, 119, 105, 104, 100 – Paul Hunter
- 132, 113 – Jimmy White
- 128, 120, 118, 109, 107, 105, 103, 101, 100 – Stephen Hendry
- 128, 102 – Quinten Hann
- 121, 104 – Peter Ebdon
- 119, 112, 106 – Alan McManus
- 116, 101 – Steve Davis
- 104 – Ian McCulloch
- 103 – Nigel Bond
- 103 – Gerard Greene
- 103 – Mark Williams
- 100 – John Higgins
- 100 – Fergal O'Brien

=== Qualifying stage centuries ===
- 143, 129, 112 – Stuart Bingham
- 140, 126, 119 – Barry Pinches
- 139, 135, 100 – Tom Ford
- 138 – Michael Wild
- 137 – Stephen Maguire
- 135 – Michael Holt
- 132, 113, 108, 104, 102 – Rory McLeod
- 132 – Gerard Greene
- 129 – Steve Mifsud
- 127, 115, 115, 111 – Ryan Day
- 127 – Scott MacKenzie
- 124, 120, 110, 102 – Nigel Bond
- 123 – Jamie Cope
- 121, 106 – Munraj Pal
- 121 – Martin Gould
- 121 – Bjorn Haneveer
- 120, 118 – Mark Davis
- 120 – Andrew Norman
- 118 – Atthasit Mahitthi
- 117, 108, 107, 102 – Neil Robertson
- 117 – Nick Dyson
- 115 – Gary Thomson
- 114 – Robin Hull
- 110 – Craig Butler
- 107 – Paul Wykes
- 105, 101 – Adrian Rosa
- 105 – Mike Dunn
- 104, 100 – Anthony Hamilton
- 104 – Simon Bedford
- 104 – Liu Song
- 102 – Chris Melling
- 102 – Shaun Murphy
