= Billiards and snooker at the 2017 SEA Games – Results =

Kuala Lumpur 2017
Billiards and snooker
English billiards
Singles	men
Nine-ball
Singles	men
women
Doubles	men
Snooker
Singles	men
Doubles	men

The billiards and snooker competitions at the 2017 Southeast Asian Games in Kuala Lumpur took place at Kuala Lumpur Convention Centre in Kuala Lumpur City Centre.

The 2017 Games featured competitions in five events (all events for men).

== Men's English billiards singles ==
Men's English billiards singles at the 2017 SEA Games
- Venue: Kuala Lumpur Convention Centre
- Date: August 2017

Kuala Lumpur 2017
Billiards and snooker
English billiards
Singles	men
Nine-ball
Singles	men
women
Doubles	men
Snooker
Singles	men
Doubles	men

=== Knockout round ===
==== Finals ====
Semifinals			Finals
1	Peter Edward Gilchrist (SGP)	301
3	Nay Thway Oo (MYA)	105	1	Peter Edward Gilchrist (SGP)	300
3	Praprut Chaithanasakun (THA)	311	2	Chit Ko Ko (MYA)	31
2	Chit Ko Ko (MYA)	357

==== Section 1 ====
Preliminary		Quarterfinals		Semifinals
		Peter Edward Gilchrist (SGP)	301
Tran Le Anh Tuan (VIE)	118	Efren Reyes (PHI)	138
Efren Reyes (PHI)	300			Peter Edward Gilchrist (SGP)	301
Thawat Sujaritthurakarn (THA)	301			Nay Thway Oo (MYA)	105
Adwin Teh (MAS)	109	Thawat Sujaritthurakarn (THA)	322
Marlando Sihombing (INA)	297	Nay Thway Oo (MYA)	396
Nay Thway Oo (MYA)	399

==== Section 2 ====
Preliminary		Quarterfinals		Semifinals
Praprut Chaithanasakun (THA)	300
Nguyen Thanh Binh (VIE)	88	Praprut Chaithanasakun (THA)	300
Francisco Dela Cruz (PHI)	76	Jaka Kurniawan (INA)	50
Jaka Kurniawan (INA)	304			Praprut Chaithanasakun (THA)	311
Yeo Teck Shin (SGP)	269			Chit Ko Ko (MYA)	357
Chooi Yew Wah (MAS)	342	Chooi Yew Wah (MAS)	75
		Chit Ko Ko (MYA)	301

== Men's nine-ball singles ==
Men's nine-ball singles at the 2017 SEA Games
- Venue: Kuala Lumpur Convention Centre
- Date: August 2017

Kuala Lumpur 2017
Billiards and snooker
English billiards
Singles	men
Nine-ball
Singles	men
women
Doubles	men
Snooker
Singles	men
Doubles	men

=== Knockout round ===
==== Finals ====
Semifinals			Finals
1	Biado Carlo (PHI)	9
3	Nguyen Anh Tuan (VIE)	5	1	Biado Carlo (PHI)	9
4	Johann Chua (PHI)	7	2	Duong Quoc Hoang (VIE)	5
2	Duong Quoc Hoang (VIE)	9

==== Section 1 ====
Preliminary		Quarterfinals		Semifinals
Biado Carlo (PHI)	9
Amnuayporn Chotipong (THA)	3	Biado Carlo (PHI)	9
Ibrahim bin Amir (MAS)	7	Irsal Afrinneza Nasution (INA)	8
Irsal Afrinneza Nasution (INA)	9			Biado Carlo (PHI)	9
Toh Lian Han (SGP)	9			Nguyen Anh Tuan (VIE)	5
Minalavong Suriya (LAO)	0	Toh Lian Han (SGP)	0
Munn Hien Kyaw (MYA)	1	Nguyen Anh Tuan (VIE)	9
Nguyen Anh Tuan (VIE)	9

==== Section 2 ====
Preliminary		Quarterfinals		Semifinals
Johann Chua (PHI)	9
Muhammad Almie (MAS)	5	Johann Chua (PHI)	9
Muhammad Bewi Simanjuntak (INA)	9	Muhammad Bewi Simanjuntak (INA)	6
Vongxay Hongsavady (LAO)	2			Johann Chua (PHI)	7
Yapp Aloysius (SGP)	9			Duong Quoc Hoang (VIE)	9
Tanut Makkamontree (THA)	5	Yapp Aloysius (SGP)	3
Duong Quoc Hoang (VIE)	9	Duong Quoc Hoang (VIE)	9
Maung Maung (MYA)	4

== Men's nine-ball doubles ==
Men's nine-ball doubles at the 2017 SEA Games
- Venue: Kuala Lumpur Convention Centre
- Date: August 2017

Kuala Lumpur 2017
Billiards and snooker
English billiards
Singles	men
Nine-ball
Singles	men
women
Doubles	men
Snooker
Singles	men
Doubles	men

=== Knockout round ===
==== Finals ====
Semifinals			Finals
1	Warren Kiamco (PHI); Dennis Orcollo (PHI)	7
3	Toh Lian Han (SGP); Yapp Aloysius (SGP)	9	3	Toh Lian Han (SGP); Yapp Aloysius (SGP)	9
3	Maung Maung (MYA); Aung Moe Thu (MYA)	9	3	Maung Maung (MYA); Aung Moe Thu (MYA)	3
-	Arun (INA); Jefry Zen (INA)	6

==== Section 1 ====
Quarterfinals			Semifinals
1	Warren Kiamco (PHI); Dennis Orcollo (PHI)	9
-	Darryl Chia Soo Yew (MAS); Ibrahim bin Amir (MAS)	6	1	Warren Kiamco (PHI); Dennis Orcollo (PHI)	7
-	Minalavong Suriya (LAO); Vongxay Hongsavady (LAO)	4	3	Toh Lian Han (SGP); Yapp Aloysius (SGP)	9
3	Toh Lian Han (SGP); Yapp Aloysius (SGP)	9

==== Section 2 ====
Quarterfinals			Semifinals
3	Maung Maung (MYA); Aung Moe Thu (MYA)	9
-	Amnuayporn Chotipong (THA); Tanut Makkamontree (THA)	8	3	Maung Maung (MYA); Aung Moe Thu (MYA)	9
-	Arun (INA); Jefry Zen (INA)	9	-	Arun (INA); Jefry Zen (INA)	6
2	Duong Quoc Hoang (VIE); Nguyen Anh Tuan (VIE)	7

== Men's snooker singles ==
Men's snooker singles at the 2017 SEA Games
- Venue: Kuala Lumpur Convention Centre
- Date: August 2017

Kuala Lumpur 2017
Billiards and snooker
English billiards
Singles	men
Nine-ball
Singles	men
women
Doubles	men
Snooker
Singles	men
Doubles	men

=== Knockout round ===
==== Finals ====
Semifinals			Finals
-	Phaitoon Phonbun (THA)	4
-	Minalavong Suriya (LAO)	0	-	Phaitoon Phonbun (THA)	1
-	Sakbieng Siththideth (LAO)	4	-	Sakbieng Siththideth (LAO)	4
2	Ko Htet (MYA)	0

==== Section 1 ====
Preliminary		Quarterfinals		Semifinals
Thor Chuan Leong (MAS)	0
Phaitoon Phonbun (THA)	4	Phaitoon Phonbun (THA)	4
Yoni Rachmanto (INA)	4	Yoni Rachmanto (INA)	2
Tey Choon Kiat (SGP)	2			Phaitoon Phonbun (THA)	4
Thai Van Nam (VIE)	2			Minalavong Suriya (LAO)	0
Ye Saw Htut (MYA)	4	Ye Saw Htut (MYA)	3
Minalavong Suriya (LAO)	4	Minalavong Suriya (LAO)	4
Jefry Roda (PHI)	0

==== Section 2 ====
Preliminary		Quarterfinals		Semifinals
Chan Keng Kwang (SGP)	4
Kieu Thien Khoi (VIE)	0	Chan Keng Kwang (SGP)	2
Gebby Adi Wibaba Putra (INA)	0	Sakbieng Siththideth (LAO)	4
Sakbieng Siththideth (LAO)	4			Sakbieng Siththideth (LAO)	4
Issara Kachaiwong (THA)	4			Ko Htet (MYA)	0
Al-Shajjar Basil Hassan (PHI)	1	Issara Kachaiwong (THA)	0
Moh Keen Hoo (MAS)	2	Ko Htet (MYA)	4
Ko Htet (MYA)	4

== Men's snooker doubles ==
Men's snooker doubles at the 2017 SEA Games
- Venue: Kuala Lumpur Convention Centre
- Date: August 2017

Kuala Lumpur 2017
Billiards and snooker
English billiards
Singles	men
Nine-ball
Singles	men
women
Doubles	men
Snooker
Singles	men
Doubles	men

=== Knockout round ===
==== Finals ====
Semifinals			Finals
1	Moh Keen Hoo (MAS); Thor Chuan Leong (MAS)	2
3	Chan Keng Kwang (SIN); Tey Choon Kiat (SIN)	3	3	Chan Keng Kwang (SIN); Tey Choon Kiat (SIN)	3
-	Aung Phyo (MYA); Ko Htet (MYA)	2	2	Issara Kachaiwong (THA); Phaitoon Phonbun (THA)	1
2	Issara Kachaiwong (THA); Phaitoon Phonbun (THA)	3

==== Section 1 ====
Quarterfinals			Semifinals
1	Moh Keen Hoo (MAS); Thor Chuan Leong (MAS)	3
-	Phoutthabandit Daophachan (LAO); Sakbieng Siththideth (LAO)	1	1	Moh Keen Hoo (MAS); Thor Chuan Leong (MAS)	2
-	Gebby Adi Wibawa Putra (INA); Yoni Rachmanto (INA)	0	3	Chan Keng Kwang (SIN); Tey Choon Kiat (SIN)	3
3	Chan Keng Kwang (SIN); Tey Choon Kiat (SIN)	3

==== Section 2 ====
Quarterfinals			Semifinals
3	Alvin Barbero (PHI); Jefrey Roda (PHI)	0
-	Aung Phyo (MYA); Ko Htet (MYA)	3	-	Aung Phyo (MYA); Ko Htet (MYA)	2
-	Kieu Thien Khoi (VIE); Thai Van Nam (VIE)	0	2	Issara Kachaiwong (THA); Phaitoon Phonbun (THA)	3
2	Issara Kachaiwong (THA); Phaitoon Phonbun (THA)	3
