= Myanmar at the 2017 SEA Games =

Myanmar at the 2017 Southeast Asian Games
- IOC code: MYA
- NOC: Myanmar Olympic Committee

in Malaysia
- Competitors: 384 in 29 sports
- Flag bearer: Aung Myo Swe
- Medals Ranked 7th: Gold 7 Silver 10 Bronze 20 Total 37

Southeast Asian Games appearances (overview)
- 1959; 1961; 1965; 1967; 1969; 1971; 1973; 1975; 1977; 1979; 1981; 1983; 1985; 1987; 1989; 1991; 1993; 1995; 1997; 1999; 2001; 2003; 2005; 2007; 2009; 2011; 2013; 2015; 2017; 2019; 2021; 2023; 2025; 2027; 2029

Myanmar is scheduled to compete at the 2017 Southeast Asian Games in Malaysia from 19 to 30 August 2017.

== Medal summary ==
=== Medal by sport ===
Medals by sport
Sport	1st place, gold medalist(s)	2nd place, silver medalist(s)	3rd place, bronze medalist(s)	Total
Archery	0	1	0	1
Athletics	0	0	1	1
Billiards and snooker	0	3	3	6
Field hockey	0	1	0	1
Football	0	0	1	1
Judo	0	1	0	1
Karate	0	0	4	4
Sepak takraw	4	2	1	7
Shooting	1	0	3	4
Taekwondo	0	0	4	4
Wushu	2	2	2	6
Weightlifting	0	0	1	1
Total	7	10	20	37

=== Medal by date ===
Medals by date
Day	Date	1st place, gold medalist(s)	2nd place, silver medalist(s)	3rd place, bronze medalist(s)	Total
–3	16 August	1	0	0	1
–2	17 August	1	0	0	1
–1	18 August	0	1	0	1
0	19 August	0	0	0	0
1	20 August	0	1	0	1
2	21 August	1	0	1	2
3	22 August	1	2	4	7
4	23 August	0	1	2	3
5	24 August	1	1	4	6
6	25 August	1	2	1	4
7	26 August	0	0	3	3
8	27 August	1	1	2	4
9	28 August	0	0	2	2
10	29 August	0	1	1	2
11	30 August	0	0	0	0
Total		7	10	20	37

=== Medalists ===
Medal	Name	Sport	Event	16/8-2017
Gold	Myanmar (MYA); Kaung Myat Thiha; Khant Win Hein; Kyaw Soe Moe; Min Hsatt Paing; Myo Min Paing; Naing Aung; Sai Zaw Zaw; Wai Yan Phyoe	Sepak takraw	Chinlone - Same stroke	16 August 2017
Gold	Myanmar (MYA); Kaung Myat Thiha; Khant Win Hein; Kyaw Soe Moe; Myo Min Paing; Naing Aung; Sai Zaw Zaw; Wai Yan Phyoe; Ya Wai Aung	Sepak takraw	Chinlone – non-repetition secondary	17 August 2017
Gold	Thein Than Oo	Wushu	Nandao + nan gun	21 August 2017
Gold	Myat Thet Hsu Wai Phyo	Wushu	Changquan	22 August 2017
Gold	May Poe Wah	Shooting	Women's 10m air pistol	24 August 2017
Gold	Myanmar (MYA); Kay Zin Htut; Khin Hnin Wai; Kyu Kyu Thin; Nan Su Myat San; Nant Yin Yin Myint; Thin Zar Soe Nyunt	Sepak taraw	Women's quadrant	25 August 2017
Gold	Myanmar (MYA); Aung Myo Swe; Thant Zin Oo; Zaw Zaw Aung	Sepak taraw	Men's doubles	27 August 2017
Silver	Myanmar (MYA); Ye Min Swe; Aung Ngeain	Archery	Mixed team compound	18 August 2017
Silver	Aye Thitsar Myint	Wushu	Nanquan	20 August 2017
Silver	Sandy Oo	Wushu	Changquan	22 August 2017
Silver	Myanmar (MYA); Aung Myo Naing; Aung Myo Swe; Aung Pyae Tun; Htet Myat Thu; Thant Zin Oo; Wai Lin Aung; Zaw Zaw Aung; Zin Ko Ko; Zin Min Oo	Sepak taraw	Men's team doubles	22 August 2017
Silver	Myanmar (MYA); Aung Htay; Min Si Thu Tun	Billiards and snooker	Men's English billiards doubles	23 August 2017
Silver	Myanmar (MYA); Maung Maung; Aung Moe Thu	Billiards and snooker	Men's 9-ball doubles	24 August 2017
Silver	Chit Ko Ko	Billiards and snooker	Men's English billiards singles	25 August 2017
Silver	Myanmar (MYA); Aung Myo Swe; Aung Pyae Tun; Aung Thu Min; Thant Zin Oo; Zin Ko Ko; Zin Min Oo	Sepak taraw	Men's quadrant	25 August 2017
Silver	Aye Aye Aung	Judo	Women's 78kg	27 August 2017
Silver	Myanmar (MYA); Aung Myo Thu; Thant Zin Oo; Aye Myint Ko; Zar Ni; Hein Min Zaw; Sit Nyein Aye; Than Htut Win; Thein Htike Oo; Thet Htwe; Thein Htike Aung; Thet Paing Tun; Nay Shein; Soe Lin Aung; Ko Wai; Nyein Chan Aung; Pyae Sone Lin; Maung Hein; Ko Ko Lin	Field hockey	Men's tournament	29 August 2017
Bronze	Sandy Oo	Wushu	Qiang Shu (spear)	21 August 2017
Bronze	Khant Min Htet	Wushu	Taijiquan	22 August 2017
Bronze	Min Hein Khant	Karate	Men's individual Kata	22 August 2017
Bronze	Myint Maung Maung	Karate	Men's kumite Below 60kg	22 August 2017
Bronze	Kyaw Swar Win	Shooting	Men's 50m pistol	22 August 2017
Bronze	May Thu Cho	Karate	Women's kumite Below 61kg	23 August 2017
Bronze	Myanmar (MYA); Aung Phyo; Ko Htet	Billiards and snooker	Men's Snooker doubles	23 August 2017
Bronze	Swe Li Myint	Athletics	Women's 800 metres	24 August 2017
Bronze	Kaung Htike	Shooting	Men's 50m rifle prone	24 August 2017
Bronze	Myanmar (MYA); Mya Phu Ngon; Khin Than Wai; Zin Mar Win; Wai Wai Aung; Phu Pwint Khaing; San San Maw; Win Theingi Tun; Naw Arlo Wer Phaw; Yee Yee Oo; Khin Marlar Tun; Khin Moe Wai; Le Le Hlaing; Than Than Htwe; May Sabai Phoo; Nu Nu; July Kyaw; Khin Mo Mo Tun; Zar Zar Myint; Ei Yadanar Phyo; Chit Chit	Football	Women's tournament	24 August 2017
Bronze	Myanmar (MYA); April Phaw; May Thu Cho; Nilar Soe Oo; Win Thuzar Min	Karate	Women's kumite Team	24 August 2017
Bronze	Nay Thway Oo	Billiards and snooker	Men's English billiards singles	25 August 2017
Bronze	Sun Shine	Taekwondo	Men's singles	26 August 2017
Bronze	Thet Myat Noe Wai	Taekwondo	Women's singles	26 August 2017
Bronze	Kyaw Swar Win	Shooting	Men's 10m air pistol	26 August 2017
Bronze	Myanmar (MYA); Phyu Phyu Than; Khin Hnin Wai; Kyu Kyu Thin	Sepak taraw	Women's doubles	27 August 2017
Bronze	Ko Htet	Billiards and snooker	Men's snooker singles	27 August 2017
Bronze	Zaw Lin Htet	Taekwondo	Men's finweight 54kg	28 August 2017
Bronze	Myint Kyi	Weightlifting	Men's 62kg	28 August 2017
Bronze	Dha Ysi Oo Julios	Taekwondo	Women's finweight 49kg	29 August 2017

=== Multiple medalists ===
Name	Sport	Gold	Silver	Bronze	Total
Myanmar (MYA); Kaung Myat Thiha; Khant Win Hein; Kyaw Soe Moe; Myo Min Paing; Naing Aung; Sai Zaw Zaw; Wai Yan Phyoe	Sepak takraw	2	0	0	2
Myanmar (MYA); Aung Myo Swe; Thant Zin Oo	Sepak takraw	1	2	0	3
Myanmar (MYA); Zaw Zaw Aung	Sepak takraw	1	1	0	2
Myanmar (MYA); Aung Pyae Tun; Zin Ko Ko; Zin Min Oo	Sepak takraw	0	2	0	2
Sandy Oo	Wushu	0	1	1	2
Ko Htet	Billiards and snooker	0	0	2	2
May Thu Cho	Karate	0	0	2	2
Kyaw Swar Win	Shooting	0	0	2	2
