= Joven Alba =

Professional cue sports player, born 1969

Personal information
- Born: 24 August 1969 (age 56)
- Died: 2016

Pool career
- Country: Philippines
- Pool games: 9-Ball

Tournament wins
- Major: Team snooker at the 2005 Southeast Asian Games

Joven Alba (24 August 1969 – 2016) was a Filipino professional pool and snooker player. Alba was a professional pool player between 2009 and 2013, and having played snooker beforehand. Alba's biggest accomplishment was winning the team snooker event at the 2005 Southeast Asian Games. Alongside partners Leonardo Andam and Alex Pagulayan the Filipino team defeated Thailand team of Nitiwat Kanjanjanasri, Phaithoon Phonbun and Supoj Saenla in the final.

In pool, Alba reached the quarter-finals of both the 2010 and 2011 WPA World Eight-ball Championships, losing to Darren Appleton on both occasions.

== Death ==
Alba died in 2016, according to Facebook.

== Achievements ==
- 2005 Southeast Asian Games Snooker Team
- 1995 Southeast Asian Games Nine-ball Doubles
