= Billiards and snooker at the 2005 SEA Games =

Billiards and Snooker at the 2005 SEA Games
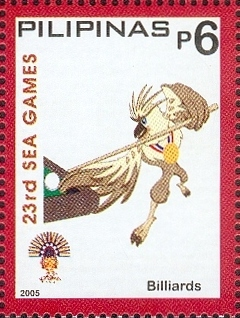
- Logo of billiards and snooker at the 2005 Southeast Asian Games on a 2005 stamp of the Philippines
- Venue: Makati Coliseum
- Location: Makati, Metro Manila
- Date: November 27 – December 4

Billiards and Snooker at the 2005 SEA Games were held at the Makati Coliseum in Makati, Metro Manila. Participants competed in several events. This was the first time that women were allowed to compete in the events.

== Medal table ==
* Host nation (Philippines)

Rank	Nation	Gold	Silver	Bronze	Total
1	Philippines (PHI)*	8	2	1	11
2	Thailand (THA)	2	4	0	6
2	Vietnam (VIE)	2	4	0	6
4	Singapore (SIN)	1	2	5	8
5	Myanmar (MYA)	1	1	0	2
6	Malaysia (MAS)	0	1	5	6
7	Indonesia (INA)	0	0	3	3
Totals (7 entries)		14	14	14	42

== Medalists ==
=== Carom ===
Men

Event	Gold	Silver	Bronze
One-cushion carom	Nguyễn Thanh Bình; Vietnam	Lê Phước Lợi; Vietnam	Reynaldo Grandea; Philippines

=== Pool ===
Men

Event	Gold	Silver	Bronze
8-ball singles	Alex Pagulayan; Philippines	Lee Vann Corteza; Philippines	Bernard Tey Choon Kiat; Singapore
8-ball doubles	Philippines; Lee Vann Corteza; Antonio Gabica	Vietnam; Nguyễn Phúc Long; Nguyễn Thành Nam	Singapore; Bernard Tey Choon Kiat; Chan Keng Kwang
9-ball singles	Chan Keng Kwang; Singapore	Lương Chí Dũng; Vietnam	Patrick Ooi Fook Yuen; Malaysia
9-ball doubles	Philippines; Alex Pagulayan; Dennis Orcollo	Vietnam; Nguyễn Thành Nam; Lương Chí Dũng	Singapore; Toh Lian Han; Chan Keng Kwang
15-ball singles	Ronato Alcano; Philippines	Antonio Gabica; Philippines	Muhamad Junarto Kosugi; Indonesia
15-ball doubles	Philippines; Ronato Alcano; Leonardo Andam	Thailand; Tepwin Arunnath; Amnuayporn Chotipong	Malaysia; Ibrahim Amir; Patrick Ooi Fook Yuen

Women

Event	Gold	Silver	Bronze
8-ball singles	Rubilen Amit; Philippines	Hoe Shu Wah; Singapore	Charlene Chai Zeet Huey; Singapore
9-ball singles	Rubilen Amit; Philippines	Suhana Dewi Sabtu; Malaysia	Hoe Shu Wah; Singapore

=== Snooker ===
Men

Event	Gold	Silver	Bronze
Snooker singles	Issara Kachaiwong; Thailand	Nitiwat Kanjanasari; Thailand	Moh Keen Hoo; Malaysia
Snooker doubles	Thailand; Phaitoon Phonbun; Issara Kachaiwong	Singapore; Keith E Boon Aun; Alex Puan Yi Wei	Malaysia; Lee Hwa Meng; Moh Keen Hoo
Snooker team	Philippines; Alex Pagulayan; Joven Alba; Leonardo Andam	Thailand; Nitiwat Kanjanasari; Phaitoon Phonbun; Supoj Saenla	Indonesia; Rudy Sulaeman; Bambang Saputra; Sayumin Teng
English billiards singles	Nguyễn Thanh Long; Vietnam	Kyaw Oo; Myanmar	Hasan Manfaluti; Indonesia
English billiards doubles	Myanmar; Kyaw Oo; Aung San Oo	Thailand; Praput Chaithanasakun; Atthasit Mahitthi	Malaysia; Lean Kam Beng; Roslan Yurnalis
