= Texas Hold 'Em Billiards Championship =

The Texas Hold 'Em Billiards Championship was a short-lived pool tournament held in the US. It was promoted by Allen Hopkins Productions and Billiards International. Eight chosen players compete in this event. Like the Skins Billiards Championship, this one pits four players against each other. Only two editions of this event took place. Marlon Manalo (2005) and Johnny Archer (2007) were the victors.

== Format ==
The format used in the tournament is a modified version of the pool game nine-ball, that emulates Texas Hold 'em, the most popular variation of poker. Each of the four players carries chips like those used in poker. In each rack, the players wager a number of them. The winner of that particular rack collects the others' wagers. If a player's chips is less than wager, that player has to go "all in" which means all of that player's chips must be wagered. After every four racks, the wager rises. In later racks, the player with the fewest chips will have to wager all. Players running out of chips are eliminated from the match.

In the semi-finals of the event (the first round of the tournament featuring all 8 players), the 4 contestants on each of the two matches play until only two of them remain. At the final match (the final 4 players), only one survives and wins the title.

In most pool tournaments, a players can miss a shot and (providing they do not foul while doing so) the incoming opponent must take whatever shot may be available. In the Texas Hold 'Em Billiards Championship, missing a shot awards ball-in-hand to the next player. This eliminates defensive play, but makes the game faster.

== Change in prize money offer and demise ==
In 2005, the tournament offered a $100K prize which was all awarded to the winner. This made it similar to the International Challenge of Champions. But when the tournament was held again and for the last time in 2007, a rather smaller purse of $80K was offered and was distributed among all the participants. The reason to this change has remained unexplained. Also, the tournament was never staged again for unknown reasons.
