= Sepak takraw at the 2017 SEA Games – Results =

The sepak takraw competitions at the 2017 SEA Games in Kuala Lumpur took place at Titiwangsa Indoor Stadium in Kuala Lumpur.

The 2017 Games featured competitions in 8 sepaktakraw event and 4 chinlone event.

== Men's doubles ==
=== Round robin ===
Rank	Team	W	L	MF	MA	MD	PTS
1	Myanmar (MYA)	4	0	8	1	+7	12
2	Malaysia (MAS)	3	1	6	4	+2	9
3	Laos (LAO)	2	2	5	5	0	6
4	Philippines (PHI)	1	3	5	6	-1	3
5	Cambodia (CAM)	0	4	0	8	-8	0

Date	Team 1	Result	Team 2
25 Aug	Cambodia	0:2 (8:21, 13:21)	Malaysia
25 Aug	Philippines	1:2 (21:16, 11:21, 13:21)	Myanmar
25 Aug	Laos	2:0 (21:10, 21:11)	Cambodia
25 Aug	Philippines	1:2 (10:21, 21:17, 17:21)	Malaysia
26 Aug	Myanmar	2:0 (21:8, 21:12)	Laos
26 Aug	Philippines	2:0 (21:13, 21:11)	Cambodia
26 Aug	Malaysia	0:2 (17:21, 13:21)	Myanmar
26 Aug	Philippines	1:2 (17:21, 21:16, 17:21)	Laos
27 Aug	Laos	1:2 (16:21, 21:19, 16:21)	Malaysia
27 Aug	Myanmar	2:0 (21:10, 21:9)	Cambodia

== Women's doubles ==
=== Group stage ===
Key to colours in group table
Group winner and runner-up advanced to the semifinals

==== Group A ====
Rank	Team	W	L	MF	MA	MD	PTS
1	Thailand (THA)	2	0	4	0	+4	6
2	Vietnam (VIE)	1	1	2	3	-1	3
3	Laos (LAO)	0	2	1	4	-3	0

Date	Team 1	Result	Team 2
25 Aug	Thailand	2:0 (21:15, 21:14)	Vietnam
26 Aug	Vietnam	2:1 (21:19, 16:21, 21:17)	Laos
26 Aug	Thailand	2:0 (21:11, 21:9)	Laos

==== Group B ====
Rank	Team	W	L	MF	MA	MD	PTS
1	Myanmar (MYA)	2	0	4	0	+4	6
2	Malaysia (MAS)	1	1	2	3	-1	3
3	Philippines (PHI)	0	2	1	4	-3	0

Date	Team 1	Result	Team 2
25 Aug	Myanmar	2:0 (21:16, 21:14)	Philippines
26 Aug	Philippines	1:2 (22:20, 12:21, 17:21)	Malaysia
26 Aug	Myanmar	2:0 (21:16, 21:18)	Malaysia

=== Knockout stage ===
==== Semifinals ====
Date	Team 1	Result	Team 2
27 Aug	Thailand	2:0 (21:12, 21:19)	Malaysia
27 Aug	Myanmar	0:2 (19:21, 18:21)	Vietnam

==== Finals ====
Date	Team 1	Result	Team 2
27 Aug	Thailand	2:1 (21:15, 20:22, 21:9)	Vietnam

== Men's regu ==
=== Round robin ===
Rank	Team	W	L	MF	MA	MD	PTS
1	Malaysia (MAS)	4	0	8	0	+8	12
2	Philippines (PHI)	3	1	6	3	+3	9
3	Laos (LAO)	2	2	5	4	+1	6
3	Brunei (BRU)	1	3	2	6	-4	3
5	Cambodia (CAM)	0	4	0	8	-8	0

Date	Team 1	Result	Team 2
28 Aug	Brunei	0:2 (11:21, 7:21)	Malaysia
28 Aug	Cambodia	0:2 (5:21, 15:21)	Philippines
28 Aug	Cambodia	0:2 (12:21, 10:21)	Malaysia
28 Aug	Brunei	0:2 (10:21, 16:21)	Laos
28 Aug	Philippines	2:1 (16:21, 22:20, 21:8)	Laos
29 Aug	Malaysia	2:0 (21:11, 21:10)	Laos
29 Aug	Brunei	2:0 (21:13, 21:10)	Cambodia
29 Aug	Brunei	0:2 (10:21, 18:21)	Philippines
29 Aug	Laos	2:0 (21:11, 21:5)	Cambodia
29 Aug	Malaysia	2:0 (25:23, 21:13)	Philippines

== Women's regu ==
=== Round robin ===
Rank	Team	W	L	MF	MA	MD	PTS
1	Thailand (THA)	3	0	6	0	6	9
2	Malaysia (MAS)	2	1	4	2	2	6
3	Philippines (PHI)	1	2	2	4	-2	3
4	Indonesia (INA)	0	3	0	6	-6	0

Date	Team 1	Result	Team 2
20 Aug	Malaysia	2:0 (21:13, 21:17)	Philippines
20 Aug	Thailand	2:0 (21-13, 21-9)	Indonesia
20 Aug	Malaysia	2:0 (w/o) (22:20, 10:16); Indonesia walked off	Indonesia
20 Aug	Thailand	2:0 (21:8, 21:8)	Philippines
21 Aug	Thailand	2:0 (21:10, 21:12)	Malaysia
21 Aug	Indonesia	0:2 (w/o); Indonesia withdrew	Philippines

== Men's quadrant ==
=== Group stage ===
Key to colours in group table
Group winner and runner-up advanced to the semifinals

==== Group A ====
Rank	Team	W	L	MF	MA	MD	PTS
1	Thailand (THA)	2	0	4	0	4	6
2	Indonesia (INA)	1	1	2	3	-1	3
3	Laos (LAO)	0	2	1	4	-3	0

Date	Team 1	Result	Team 2
23 Aug	Thailand	2:0 (21:18, 21:16)	Indonesia
23 Aug	Indonesia	2:1 (13:21, 21:12, 21:19)	Laos
24 Aug	Laos	0:2 (15:21, 10:21)	Thailand

==== Group B ====
Rank	Team	W	L	MF	MA	MD	PTS
1	Myanmar (MYA)	2	0	4	0	4	4
2	Malaysia (MAS)	1	1	2	2	0	2
3	Brunei (BRU)	0	2	0	4	-4	0

Date	Team 1	Result	Team 2
23 Aug	Myanmar	2:0 (21:19, 21:9)	Brunei
23 Aug	Brunei	0:2 (13:21, 10:21)	Malaysia
24 Aug	Malaysia	0:2 (11:21, 12:21)	Myanmar

=== Knockout stage ===
==== Semifinals ====
Date	Team 1	Result	Team 2
24 Aug	Thailand (THA)	2:0 (21:16, 21:13)	Malaysia (MAS)
24 Aug	Myanmar (MYA)	2:0 (21:15, 21:16)	Indonesia (INA)

==== Finals ====
Date	Team 1	Result	Team 2
25 Aug	Thailand (THA)	2:0 (21:18, 21:19)	Myanmar (MYA)

== Women's quadrant ==
=== Round robin ===
Rank	Team	W	L	MF	MA	MD	PTS
1	Myanmar (MYA)	3	1	7	2	+5	6
2	Indonesia (INA)	3	1	7	3	+4	6
3	Vietnam (VIE)	3	1	6	4	+2	6
4	Laos (LAO)	1	3	3	7	-4	2
5	Malaysia (MAS)	0	4	1	8	-7	0

Date	Team 1	Result	Team 2
23 Aug	Laos	2:1 (21:15, 13:21, 21:16)	Malaysia
23 Aug	Indonesia	2:1 (21:13, 12:21, 21:19)	Myanmar
23 Aug	Vietnam	2:1 (18:21, 21:16, 21:14)	Laos
23 Aug	Malaysia	0:2 (15:21, 14:21)	Indonesia
24 Aug	Laos	0:2 (11:21, 15:21)	Myanmar
24 Aug	Vietnam	2:0 (21:15, 21:16)	Malaysia
24 Aug	Laos	0:2 (11:21, 14:21)	Indonesia
24 Aug	Malaysia	0:2 (14:21, 11:21)	Myanmar
24 Aug	Indonesia	1:2 (21:11, 21:23, 20:22)	Vietnam
25 Aug	Myanmar	2:0 (21:16, 21:18)	Vietnam

== Men's team doubles ==
=== Group stage ===
Key to colours in group table
Group winner and runner-up advanced to the semifinals

==== Group A ====
Rank	Team	W	L	MF	MA	MD	PTS
1	Thailand (THA)	1	0	3	0	+3	3
2	Malaysia (MAS)	0	1	0	3	-3	0
	Cambodia (CAM)	Withdrawn					

Date	Team 1	Result	Team 2
20 Aug	Thailand	—	Cambodia
21 Aug	Cambodia	—	Malaysia
21 Aug	Thailand	3:0 (2:0, 2:0, 2:1)	Malaysia

==== Group B ====
Rank	Team	W	L	MF	MA	MD	PTS
1	Myanmar (MYA)	2	0	6	0	+6	6
2	Indonesia (INA)	1	1	3	3	0	3
3	Philippines (PHI)	0	2	0	6	-6	0

Date	Team 1	Result	Team 2
20 Aug	Myanmar	3:0 (2:1, 2:0, 2:0)	Indonesia
21 Aug	Indonesia	3:0 (2:0, 2:0, 2:1)	Philippines
21 Aug	Myanmar	3:0 (2:0, 2:0, 2:0)	Philippines

=== Knockout stage ===
==== Semifinals ====
Date	Team 1	Result	Team 2
22 Aug	Thailand (THA)	2:0 (2:1, 2:1)	Indonesia (INA)
22 Aug	Myanmar (MYA)	2:1 (2:0, 0:2, 2:0)	Malaysia (MAS)

==== Finals ====
Date	Team 1	Result	Team 2
22 Aug	Thailand (THA)	2:0 (2:1, 2:0)	Myanmar (MYA)

== Men's team regu ==
=== Round robin ===
Rank	Team	W	L	MF	MA	MD	PTS
1	Thailand (THA)	3	0	9	0	+9	9
2	Indonesia (INA)	2	1	5	4	+1	6
3	Malaysia (MAS)	1	2	4	5	-1	3
4	Brunei (BRU)	0	3	0	9	-9	0

Date	Team 1	Result	Team 2
18 Aug	Malaysia	3:0 (2:0, 2:0, 2:0)	Brunei
18 Aug	Indonesia	0:3 (0:2, 0:2, 0:2)	Thailand
18 Aug	Malaysia	1:2 (2:1, 1:2, 0:2)	Indonesia
18 Aug	Thailand	3:0 (2:0, 2:0, 2:0)	Brunei
19 Aug	Malaysia	0:3 (0:2, 0:2, 0:2)	Thailand
19 Aug	Brunei	0:3 (0:2, 0:2, 0:2)	Indonesia

== Chinlone Event 1 ==
The round robin and finals were held on 17 August 2017.

=== Round robin ===
Key to colours in group table
Group winner and runner-up advanced to the final

Rank	Team	Score
1	Thailand (THA)	372
2	Malaysia (MAS)	298
3	Cambodia (CAM)	280
3	Brunei (BRU)	147

=== Finals ===
Rank	Team	Score
1	Thailand (THA)	363
2	Malaysia (MAS)	300

== Chinlone Event 2 ==
The round robin and finals were held on 16 August 2017.

=== Round robin ===
Key to colours in group table
Group winner and runner-up advanced to the final

Rank	Team	Score
1	Myanmar (MYA)	301
2	Thailand (THA)	287
3	Malaysia (MAS)	182
3	Laos (LAO)	161

=== Finals ===
Rank	Team	Score
1	Myanmar (MYA)	317
2	Thailand (THA)	303

== Chinlone Event 3 ==
The round robin and finals were held on 16 August 2017.

=== Round robin ===
Key to colours in group table
Group winner and runner-up advanced to the final

Rank	Team	Score
1	Malaysia (MAS)	376
2	Philippines (PHI)	293
3	Brunei (BRU)	157

=== Finals ===
Rank	Team	Score
1	Malaysia (MAS)	287
2	Philippines (PHI)	271

== Chinlone Event 4 ==
The round robin and finals were held on 17 August 2017.

=== Round robin ===
Key to colours in group table
Group winner and runner-up advanced to the final

Rank	Team	Score
1	Myanmar (MYA)	137
2	Laos (LAO)	133
3	Malaysia (MAS)	106
3	Cambodia (CAM)	94
5	Philippines (PHI)	76

=== Finals ===
Rank	Team	Score
1	Myanmar (MYA)	149
2	Laos (LAO)	148
