= Marlon Manalo =

Filipino pool player (born 1975)

Personal information
- Nickname: "Marvelous Captain"
- Born: November 27, 1975 (age 50) Mandaluyong, Philippines
- Occupations: Professional pool player, politician
Medal record
Representing Philippines
Men's Nine-Ball
Southeast Asian Games
| Gold medal – first place | 1991 Manila | Team |
| Silver medal – second place | 1993 Singapore | Singles |
| Bronze medal – third place | 1993 Singapore | Team |
| Gold medal – first place | 1995 Chiang Mai | Doubles |
| Gold medal – first place | 2007 Nakhon Ratchasima | Doubles |
Men's Rotation
Southeast Asian Games
| Gold medal – first place | 1991 Manila | Team |
| Silver medal – second place | 1993 Singapore | Team |
Men's English Billiards
Southeast Asian Games
| Bronze medal – third place | 2001 Kuala Lumpur | Team |
Men's Snooker
World Games
| Silver medal – second place | 2001 Akita | Singles |
Southeast Asian Games
| Bronze medal – third place | 1991 Manila | Singles |
| Gold medal – first place | 1993 Singapore | Team |
| Silver medal – second place | 1995 Chiang Mai | Singles |
| Silver medal – second place | 1995 Chiang Mai | Doubles |
| Bronze medal – third place | 1997 Jakarta | Team |
| Bronze medal – third place | 1999 Bandar Seri Begawan | Singles |
| Bronze medal – third place | 1999 Bandar Seri Begawan | Team |
| Silver medal – second place | 2001 Kuala Lumpur | Doubles |
| Silver medal – second place | 2001 Kuala Lumpur | Team |
| Silver medal – second place | 2003 Ho Chi Minh City | Singles |
| Bronze medal – third place | 2003 Ho Chi Minh City | Team |

Marlon Manalo (born November 27, 1975), also known by the nickname "Marvelous Captain", is a former Filipino professional pool player. He previously served as barangay chairman of Barangay Malamig, Mandaluyong. He also became the press relation officer of the League of Barangays of the Philippines and ABC president.

== Career ==
Originally a snooker player, Manalo has represented the Philippines a number of times in the Asian Games and Southeast Asian Games. In the 2001 World Games, Manalo won the silver medal in the snooker event, placing second to Bjorn Haneveer of Belgium.

His professional debut in pool was the Tirador Nine-ball Tournament in Manila in 2003. He reached the final, but eventually lost to Warren Kiamco. Weeks later, he competed in the Tirador Ten-ball Tournament. Again, he made it to the final, but lost to Ramil Gallego. The first pool tournament he won in the Philippines was the Corporate Billiards League, a tournament where a team of three players plays against another three. All the players were local but Marcus Chamat, a pool specialist from Sweden, was in contention.

Predominantly a snooker player in a country with just four tables, Manalo is nicknamed "Marvelous." He defeated Yang Ching-shun, Francisco Bustamante and Efren Reyes in successive matches at the 2004 WPC before losing in the last eight to Marcus Chamat.

Manalo nearly won his first world title at the 2004 WPA World Eight-ball Championship, but lost to his compatriot, Efren Reyes.

Manalo won a number of tournaments in the United States in 2005, including the short-lived Texas Hold'em Billiards Championship where he earned the $100,000 winner-take-all purse, and the 2005 New Jersey Straight Pool Open. In 2006, he could have been one of the first Philippine players, along with Dennis Orcollo, to compete in the World Straight Pool Championship but withdrew to compete in another tournament in Bangkok, Thailand. That same year, he made it to the final of the IPT North American Eight-ball Open Championship. He was defeated, however, by Thorsten Hohmann who won the $350,000 first prize. Manalo received $99,000.

After he was runner-up in the 2007 Philippine National Championships to Lee Vann Corteza, Manalo won the title against Antonio Gabica a year later.

== Achievements ==
- 2008 Philippine National Championship
- 2007 Southeast Asian Games Nine-ball Doubles
- 2007 Seminole Florida Pro Tour Stop
- 2005 Texas Hold Em Billiards Championship
- 2005 NJ 14.1 Championship
- 2005 Hard Times 9-ball Championship
- 2005 Sands Regency 9-Ball Open
- 2003 Corporate Billiards League
- 2000 ACBS Asian Snooker Championship
- 1995 Southeast Asian Games Nine-ball Doubles
- 1993 Southeast Asian Games Snooker Team
- 1991 Southeast Asian Games Nine-ball Team
- 1991 Southeast Asian Games Rotation Team
