= Kwan Poomjang =

Thai snooker player (born 1975)

Personal information
- Born: January 2, 1975 (age 51) Bangkok, Thailand

Sport
- Country: Thailand
- Sport: Snooker
- Professional: 2001–2004
- Highest ranking: 69 (2003/2004)
- Best ranking finish: Last 32 (x1)
Medal record
Representing Thailand
Men's snooker
Southeast Asian Games
| Gold medal – first place | 1997 Jakarta | Singles |
| Gold medal – first place | 1997 Jakarta | Team |
| Bronze medal – third place | 2021 Hanoi | 6-red singles |
Men's Rotation
Southeast Asian Games
| Bronze medal – third place | 1999 Bandar Seri Begawan | Singles |
| Silver medal – second place | 1999 Bandar Seri Begawan | Doubles |

Suchakree "Kwan" Poomjang (Thai: สุชาครีย์ พุ่มแจ้ง; born 2 January 1975) is a Thai former professional snooker player who spent three years on the sport's main tour between 2001 and 2004. He reached the final stages of a tournament once, at the 2002 UK Championship, and attained his highest ranking - 69th - for the 2003–04 season.

Poomjang's younger brother, Dechawat Poomjaeng, also became a snooker player, and was active on the main tour between 2011 and 2017.

== Career ==
Poomjang was born in 1975, and began playing snooker at competitive level as a wildcard entry in several Thailand Masters and Thailand Open tournaments in the late 1990s. He turned professional in 2001.

Poomjang's first season on the tour went without any performances of note, but in his next, he reached the last 64 at the 2002 LG Cup - losing 2–5 to Robin Hull - and enjoyed the best finish of his career, a run to the last 32 at the 2002 UK Championship. There, he defeated Paul Davison 5–2, Wayne Brown 5–3, Stuart Pettman 5–0, Alfie Burden 5–3 and compatriot James Wattana 9–3 to set up a meeting with Graeme Dott. In their match, Poomjang led 3–0 and 8–7, but lost 8–9.

Having earned £21,950 in prize money, Poomjang was ranked 71st for the 2003/2004 season; however, he could not repeat the previous year's form, reaching only the last-80 stage at three ranking events. A 7–10 defeat to Irishman Gary Hardiman in the last 96 at the 2004 World Championship, and a rise in the rankings by two places to 69th, could not prevent Poomjang from losing his professional status at the end of the season, aged 29.

After a twelve-year hiatus from competitive snooker, Poomjang participated in the 2016 Six-red World Championship in his home country; he qualified from his group with three wins - including a 5–4 defeat of Stephen Maguire - and two losses, but was eliminated in the last 32 by Ryan Day, who beat him 6–3.

== Career finals ==
=== Amateur finals: 1 ===
| Outcome | No. | Year | Championship | Opponent in the final | Score |
|---|---|---|---|---|---|
| Runner-up | 1. | 1995 | World Under-21 Snooker Championship | (Scotland) Alan Burnett | 6–10 |
