= Billiards and snooker at the 2017 SEA Games =

Cue sports at the 2017 SEA Games
- Venue: Kuala Lumpur Convention Centre
- Location: Kuala Lumpur, Malaysia
- Date: 22–27 August 2017
- Nations: 8

Kuala Lumpur 2017
Billiards and snooker
English billiards
Singles	men
Nine-ball
Singles	men
women
Doubles	men
Snooker
Singles	men
Doubles	men

The billiards and snooker competitions at the 2017 SEA Games in Kuala Lumpur were held at Kuala Lumpur Convention Centre of Kuala Lumpur City Centre.

The 2017 Games featured competitions in seven events (6 events for men and 1 event for women).

== Events ==
The following events will be contested:

- English billiards singles (men)
- English billiards doubles (men)
- Nine-ball pool singles (men & women)
- Nine-ball pool doubles (men)
- Snooker singles (men)
- Snooker doubles (men)

== Participation ==
=== Participating nations ===
- Indonesia (10)
- Laos (4)
- Malaysia (9)
- Myanmar (12)
- Philippines (11)
- Singapore (8)
- Thailand (8)
- Vietnam (8)

== Medal summary ==
=== Medal table ===
* Host nation (Malaysia)

Rank	Nation	Gold	Silver	Bronze	Total
1	Singapore	3	0	1	4
2	Philippines	2	1	2	5
3	Thailand	1	2	1	4
4	Laos	1	0	1	2
5	Myanmar	0	3	3	6
6	Vietnam	0	1	2	3
7	Malaysia*	0	0	3	3
8	Indonesia	0	0	1	1
Totals (8 entries)		7	7	14	28

=== Men ===
Event	Gold	Silver	Bronze
English billiards singles	Peter Edward Gilchrist; Singapore	Chit Ko Ko; Myanmar	Praprut Chaithanasakun; Thailand
English billiards singles	Peter Edward Gilchrist; Singapore	Chit Ko Ko; Myanmar	Nay Thway Oo; Myanmar
English billiards doubles	Thailand (THA); Praprut Chaithanasakun; Thawat Sujaritthurakarn	Myanmar (MYA); Aung Htay; Min Si Thu Tun	Singapore (SGP); Peter Edward Gilchrist; Glenn Yeo Teck Shin
English billiards doubles	Thailand (THA); Praprut Chaithanasakun; Thawat Sujaritthurakarn	Myanmar (MYA); Aung Htay; Min Si Thu Tun	Vietnam (VIE); Nguyễn Thanh Bình; Trần Lê Anh Tuấn
9-ball pool singles	Carlo Biado; Philippines	Dương Quốc Hoàng; Vietnam	Nguyễn Anh Tuấn; Vietnam
9-ball pool singles	Carlo Biado; Philippines	Dương Quốc Hoàng; Vietnam	Johann Chua; Philippines
9-ball pool doubles	Singapore (SGP); Toh Lian Han; Aloysius Yapp	Myanmar (MYA); Maung Maung; Aung Moe Thu	Philippines (PHI); Warren Kiamco; Dennis Orcollo
9-ball pool doubles	Singapore (SGP); Toh Lian Han; Aloysius Yapp	Myanmar (MYA); Maung Maung; Aung Moe Thu	Indonesia (INA); Arun; Jefry Zen
Snooker singles	Siththideth Sakbieng; Laos	Phaitoon Phonbun; Thailand	Suriya Minalavong; Laos
Snooker singles	Siththideth Sakbieng; Laos	Phaitoon Phonbun; Thailand	Ko Htet; Myanmar
Snooker doubles	Singapore (SGP); Chan Keng Kwang; Tey Choon Kiat	Thailand (THA); Issara Kachaiwong; Phaitoon Phonbun	Malaysia (MAS); Moh Keen Hoo; Thor Chuan Leong
Snooker doubles	Singapore (SGP); Chan Keng Kwang; Tey Choon Kiat	Thailand (THA); Issara Kachaiwong; Phaitoon Phonbun	Myanmar (MYA); Aung Phyo; Ko Htet

=== Women ===
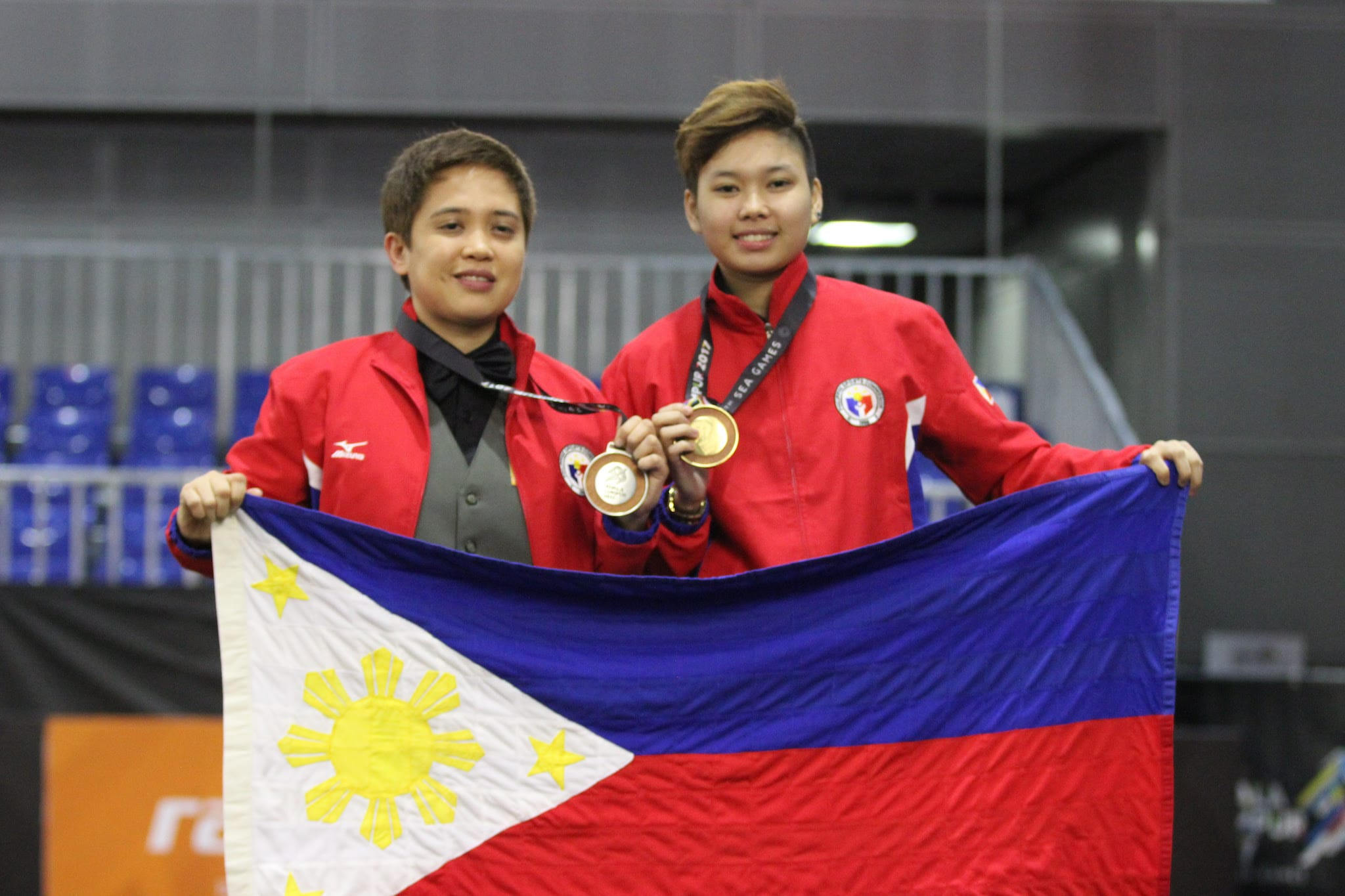
Rubilen Amit (left) and Chezka Centeno (right) of the Philippines. Centeno won gold for her country in the women's 9-ball pool singles while her compatriot, Amit settled for silver.

Event	Gold	Silver	Bronze
9-ball pool singles	Chezka Centeno; Philippines	Rubilen Amit; Philippines	Klaudia Djajalie; Malaysia
9-ball pool singles	Chezka Centeno; Philippines	Rubilen Amit; Philippines	Suhana Dewi Sabtu; Malaysia
