= Phaitoon Phonbun =

Thai snooker player

Personal information
- Born: October 5, 1975 (age 51)

Sport
- Country: Thailand
- Sport: Snooker
- Professional: 1998–2003
- Highest ranking: 70 (2000/2001)
- Best ranking finish: Last 32 (x2)
Medal record
Representing Thailand
Men's snooker
Asian Games
Silver medal – second place	1998 Bangkok	Team
South East Asian Games
Gold medal – first place	1997 Jakarta	Team
Bronze medal – third place	1997 Jakarta	Singles
Gold medal – first place	1999 Bandar Seri Begawan	Doubles
Gold medal – first place	1999 Bandar Seri Begawan	Team
Gold medal – first place	2003 Ho Chi Minh City	Team
Bronze medal – third place	2003 Ho Chi Minh City	Doubles
Gold medal – first place	2005 Manila	Doubles
Silver medal – second place	2005 Manila	Team
Gold medal – first place	2007 Nakhon Ratchasima	Doubles
Gold medal – first place	2007 Nakhon Ratchasima	Six-red singles
Gold medal – first place	2007 Nakhon Ratchasima	Team
Bronze medal – third place	2009 Vientiane	Doubles
Silver medal – second place	2017 Kuala Lumpur	Singles
Silver medal – second place	2017 Kuala Lumpur	Doubles
Men's Nine-ball
Southeast Asian Games
Bronze medal – third place	1993 Singapore	Singles
Gold medal – first place	1995 Chiang Mai	Singles
Silver medal – second place	1995 Chiang Mai	Team

Phaitoon Phonbun (Thai: ไพฑูรย์ ผลบุญ; born 5 October 1975) is a Thai former professional snooker player.

== Career ==
Phaitoon Phonbun was born on 5 October 1975. He received a wildcard entry to the 1995 Thailand Open, where he recorded a 5–2 defeat of Anthony Davies. He exited the tournament in the next round, 1–5 to Steve Davis.

Turning professional in 1998, Phonbun reached the last 48 at that season's China International, recording victories over Joe Delaney, Jason Prince and Darryn Walker before losing 2–5 to Chris Small, and the last 64 at the Welsh Open, where Alain Robidoux defeated him 5–4.

The following season heralded two more last-64 finishes, the most notable being at the 1999 UK Championship, where Phonbun faced Paul Hunter and lost 6–9. In his match against Stephen Maguire at the 2000 Scottish Open, Phonbun beat Maguire 5–4 despite the latter having compiled a maximum 147 break.

Ranked 70th, a career best, for the 2000/2001 season, Phonbun next reached the last-32 stage of a ranking event at the 2001 LG Cup. There, his opponents included Kurt Maflin, Nick Dyson, Terry Murphy and Michael Judge, but Graeme Dott eliminated him 5–1. Having fallen to 103rd in the rankings after the following season, he lost his professional status at its conclusion.

Phonbun participated in the 2015 Six-red World Championship in Thailand, qualifying from his group with wins over Ben Judge and Ehsan Heydarinezhad but being eliminated in the last 32 by Anthony McGill, who beat him 6–4. He was also invited to play in the 2016 edition of the tournament, but despite victories over Ryan Thomerson and Dominic Dale, defeats to Ding Junhui, Pankaj Advani and Robert Milkins saw him exit at the group stage.

== Career finals ==
=== Pro-am finals: 2 (1 title) ===
Outcome	No.	Year	Championship	Opponent in the final	Score
Winner	1.	2007	Southeast Asian Games (6-red)	(Thailand) Thepchaiya Un-Nooh	4–1
Runner-up	1.	2017	Southeast Asian Games	(Laos) Siththideth Sakbieng	1–4

=== Amateur finals: 2 (1 title) ===
Outcome	No.	Year	Championship	Opponent in the final	Score
Winner	1.	1994	Asian Under-21 Championship	(Pakistan) Farhan Mirza	6–4
Runner-up	1.	2002	Thailand Amateur Championship	(Thailand) Somporn Kunthawang	7–8
