= 2002 UK Championship =

2002 PowerHouse UK Championship
Tournament information
- Dates: 1–15 December 2002
- Venue: Barbican Centre
- City: York
- Country: England
- Organisation: WPBSA
- Format: Ranking event
- Total prize fund: £746,900
- Winner's share: £100,000
- Highest break: Ronnie O'Sullivan (ENG) (142)

Final
- Champion: Mark Williams (WAL)
- Runner-up: Ken Doherty (IRL)
- Score: 10–9

The 2002 UK Championship (officially the 2002 PowerHouse UK Championship) was a professional ranking snooker tournament that took place at the Barbican Centre in York, England. The event started on 1 December 2002 and the televised stages were shown on BBC between 7 and 15 December 2002. The sponsor for this year's event was Powerhouse.

Ronnie O'Sullivan was the defending champion, but he lost in the quarter-finals to Drew Henry.

Mark Williams won his second UK title in a classic 10–9 victory against Ken Doherty, who had reached his second UK final in a row. The highest break of the tournament was 142 made by Ronnie O'Sullivan.

== Tournament summary ==
2001 champion Ronnie O'Sullivan was the number 1 seed with World Champion Peter Ebdon seeded 2. The remaining places were allocated to players based on the world rankings.

== Prize fund ==
The breakdown of prize money for this year is shown below:

Winner: £100,000
Runner-up: £54,000
Semi-final: £27,250
Quarter-final: £14,500
Last 16: £11,500
Last 32: £9,200
Last 48: £5,200
Last 64: £4,175

Last 80: £2,950
Last 96: £2,000

Stage one highest break: £2,000
Stage two highest break: £10,000

Stage one maximum break: £5,000
Stage two maximum break: £25,000

Total: £746,900

== Main draw ==
Last 48; Best of 17 frames
18	(England) John Parrott	5
70	(England) Adrian Gunnell	9
27	(Hong Kong) Marco Fu	9
63	(Northern Ireland) Gerard Greene	7
22	(Scotland) Drew Henry	9
57	(England) Stuart Bingham	7
17	(England) Anthony Hamilton	8
53	(England) Mark Selby	9
23	(Republic of Ireland) Fergal O'Brien	4
52	(Scotland) Stephen Maguire	9
19	(England) David Gray	9
37	(England) Mark Davis	7
25	(England) Steve Davis	9
69	(England) Paul Wykes	2
31	(England) Ali Carter	9
64	(England) Nick Walker	4
26	(Wales) Anthony Davies	9
62	(England) Nick Dyson	3
29	(Scotland) Chris Small	9
(Republic of Ireland) Leo Fernandez	8
32	(Thailand) James Wattana	3
114	(Thailand) Kwan Poomjang	9
20	(Wales) Dominic Dale	9
67	(Scotland) Euan Henderson	6
24	(Republic of Ireland) Michael Judge	5
56	(England) Barry Pinches	9
30	(England) Nigel Bond	8
33	(England) Robert Milkins	9
28	(Malta) Tony Drago	9
48	(England) David Roe	8
21	(England) Dave Harold	9
43	(England) Ian McCulloch	6

Last 32; Best of 17 frames
1	(England) Ronnie O'Sullivan	9
70	(England) Adrian Gunnell	2
14	(Australia) Quinten Hann	7
27	(Hong Kong) Marco Fu	9
10	(England) Jimmy White	4
22	(Scotland) Drew Henry	9
7	(England) Stephen Lee	9
53	(England) Mark Selby	6
5	(Republic of Ireland) Ken Doherty	9
52	(Scotland) Stephen Maguire	7
9	(England) Paul Hunter	9
19	(England) David Gray	1
11	(England) Mark King	7
25	(England) Steve Davis	9
4	(Scotland) John Higgins	9
31	(England) Ali Carter	5
3	(Wales) Mark Williams	9
26	(Wales) Anthony Davies	2
13	(England) Joe Perry	7
29	(Scotland) Chris Small	9
12	(Scotland) Graeme Dott	9
114	(Thailand) Kwan Poomjang	8
6	(Scotland) Stephen Hendry	9
20	(Wales) Dominic Dale	4
8	(Wales) Matthew Stevens	9
56	(England) Barry Pinches	4
16	(Northern Ireland) Joe Swail	1
33	(England) Robert Milkins	9
15	(Scotland) Alan McManus	9
28	(Malta) Tony Drago	7
2	(England) Peter Ebdon	9
21	(England) Dave Harold	7

Last 16; Best of 17 frames
1	(England) Ronnie O'Sullivan	9
27	(Hong Kong) Marco Fu	7
22	(Scotland) Drew Henry	9
7	(England) Stephen Lee	8
5	(Republic of Ireland) Ken Doherty	9
9	(England) Paul Hunter	4
25	(England) Steve Davis	7
4	(Scotland) John Higgins	9
3	(Wales) Mark Williams	9
29	(Scotland) Chris Small	3
12	(Scotland) Graeme Dott	6
6	(Scotland) Stephen Hendry	9
8	(Wales) Matthew Stevens	8
33	(England) Robert Milkins	9
15	(Scotland) Alan McManus	2
2	(England) Peter Ebdon	9

Quarter-finals; Best of 17 frames
1	(England) Ronnie O'Sullivan	6
22	(Scotland) Drew Henry	9
5	(Republic of Ireland) Ken Doherty	9
4	(Scotland) John Higgins	6
3	(Wales) Mark Williams	9
6	(Scotland) Stephen Hendry	2
33	(England) Robert Milkins	4
2	(England) Peter Ebdon	9

Semi-finals; Best of 17 frames
22	(Scotland) Drew Henry	5
5	(Republic of Ireland) Ken Doherty	9
3	(Wales) Mark Williams	9
2	(England) Peter Ebdon	3

Final; Best of 19 frames
5	(Republic of Ireland) Ken Doherty	9
3	(Wales) Mark Williams	10

== Final ==
Final: Best of 19 frames. Referee: Stuart Bennett. Barbican Centre, York, England, 15 December 2002.
Ken Doherty (5); Ireland	9–10	Mark Williams (3); Wales
Afternoon: 41–68 (56), 78–8 (55), 0–86 (86), 87–28 (55), 68–66, 45–70, 9–65 (65), 63–76; Evening: 62–15 (56), 69–43 (62), 65–29, 0–128 (119), 43–47, 79–1, 0–74 (74), 0–78 (78), 58–14, 79–0 (79), 35–91 (70)
79	Highest break	119
0	Century breaks	1
5	50+ breaks	7
