= Leonardo Andam =

Filipino pool player (1958–2014)

Personal information
- Nicknames: Dodong, The Rattlesnake
- Born: August 15, 1958 Iligan, Philippines
- Died: May 22, 2014 (aged 55) Iligan

Pool career
- Country: Philippines
- Turned pro: 1976
- Pool games: Nine-ball, Rotation, Snooker
- Best finish: Quarter finals 2001 WPA World Nine-ball Championship
Medal record
Representing Philippines
Men's Nine-ball
Southeast Asian Games
Silver medal – second place	1999 Bandar Seri Begawan	Singles
Bronze medal – third place	1993 Singapore	Team
Gold medal – first place	1991 Manila	Team
Gold medal – first place	1991 Manila	Singles
Men's Rotation
Southeast Asian Games
Gold medal – first place	2005 Manila	Double
Silver medal – second place	1993 Singapore	Team
Gold medal – first place	1991 Manila	Team
Gold medal – first place	1991 Manila	Singles
Men's Snooker
Southeast Asian Games
Gold medal – first place	2005 Manila	Team
Gold medal – first place	1993 Singapore	Team

Leonardo Andam (August 15, 1958 – May 22, 2014) popularly known by the nicknames "Dodong" was a Filipino professional pool player. Andam was a multiple time winner at the Southeast Asian Games. He was part of the Filipino snooker national team alongside Joven Alba and Ronato Alcano. Andam reached the Quarter finals of the 2001 WPA World Nine-ball Championship, before losing 9–11 to Canadian Alain Martel.

== Early life and career ==
Andam captured seven gold medals in the Sea Games, as well as countless local pool and snooker championship.

== Death ==
Andam died in 2014, aged 55 from a motorcycle accident. Andam was travelling to Ozamiz for a tournament, but fell from his cycle in Iligan.

== Titles ==
- 2008 Fifth Annual One Pocket Shoot Out
- 2005 Southeast Asian Games Snooker Team
- 2005 Southeast Asian Games Rotation Doubles
- 2003 Falcon Cue 9-Ball Tour Open Division
- 2000 International 9-Ball Championship
- 2000 San Miguel Beer Match of the Masters
- 1995 Dallas Open 9-Ball
- 1993 PBT Riviera Team Championship
- 1993 Southeast Asian Games Snooker Team
- 1993 PBT Riviera Target Pool Championship
- 1991 Southeast Asian Games Rotation Team
- 1991 Southeast Asian Games Rotation Singles
- 1991 Southeast Asian Games Nine-ball Team
- 1991 Southeast Asian Games Nine-ball Singles
